= Unisex name =

Given name used for multiple genders

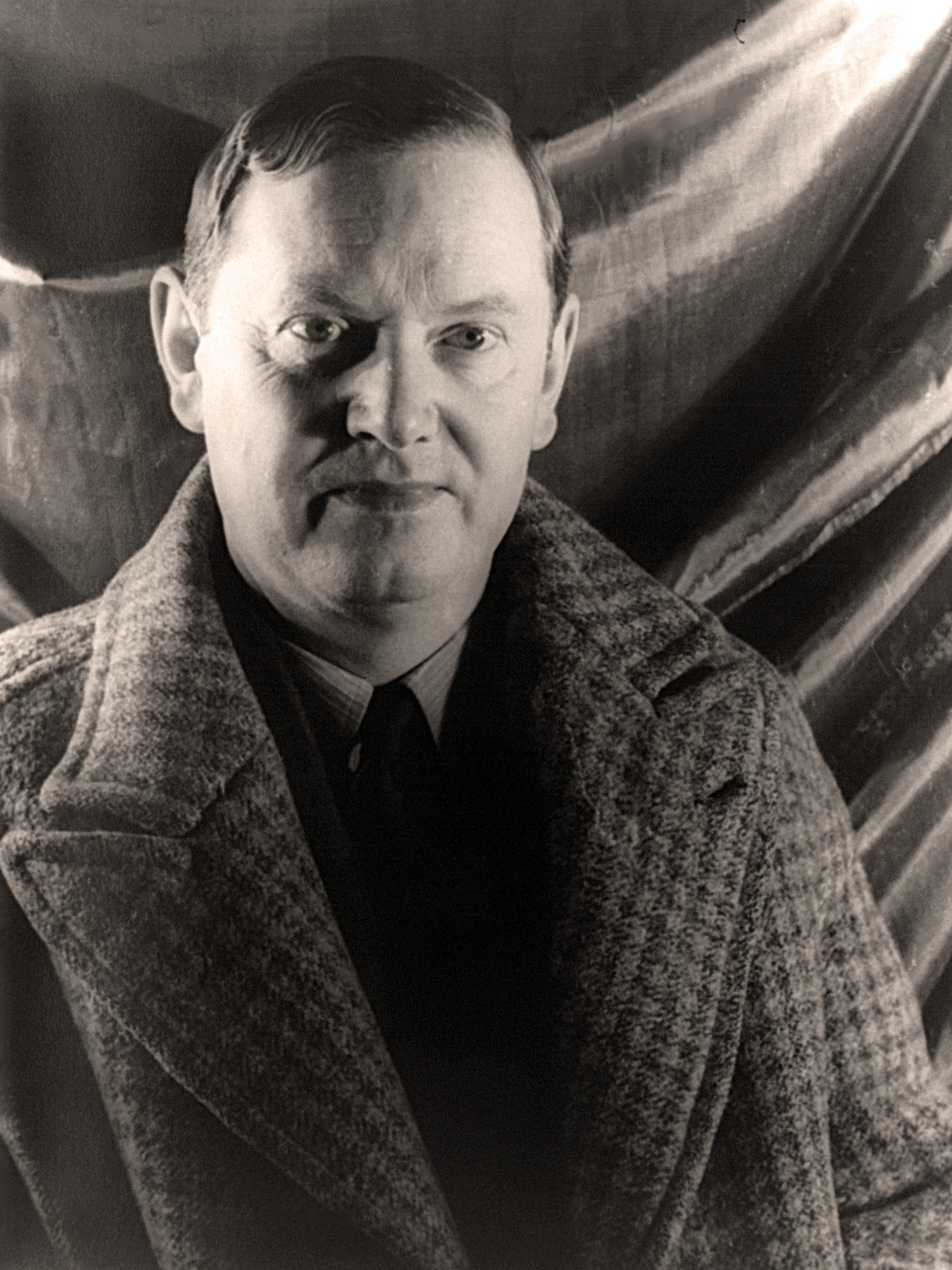
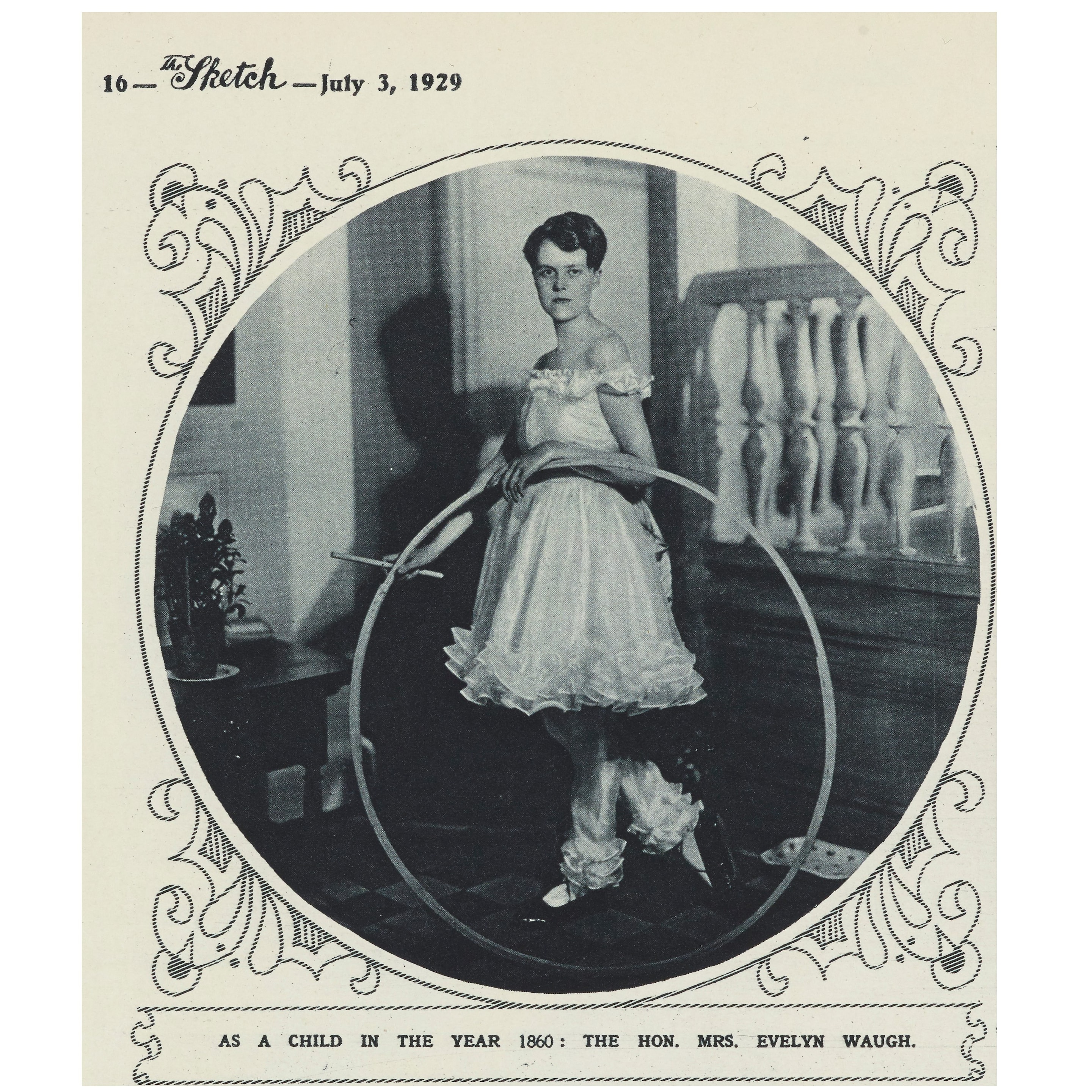
Evelyn Waugh and his first wife Evelyn Gardner had the same given name.

A unisex name (also known as an epicene name, a gender-neutral name or an androgynous name) is a given name that is not gender-specific. Unisex names are common in the English-speaking world, especially in the United States. By contrast, some countries have laws preventing unisex names, requiring parents to give their children sex-specific names. In other countries or cultures, social norms oppose such names and transgressions may result in discrimination, ridicule, and psychological abuse.

Names may have different gender connotations from country to country or language to language. For example, the Italian male name Andrea (derived from Greek Andreas) is understood as a female name in many languages, such as English, German, Hungarian, Czech, and Spanish.

Parents may name their child in honor of a person of another sex, which – if done widely – can result in the name becoming unisex. For example, Christians, particularly Catholics, may give a child a second/middle name of the opposite sex, e.g. name a son Marie or Maria in honor of the Virgin Mary or formerly Anne for Saint Anne; or name a daughter José in honor of Saint Joseph or Jean in honor of John the Baptist.

In the United States, one popular names website considers a name unisex if Census Bureau and Social Security Administration data shows a name is assigned to a particular gender less than 95 percent of the time.

Some masculine and feminine names are homophones, pronounced the same regardless of gender but spelled differently. These names are not strictly unisex names.

== African ==
Unisex names of African origin include:

=== East Africa ===
- Alemayehu
- Berhane

=== South Africa ===
- Kagiso
- Karabo
- Tshepiso (promise)
- Lerato (love)
- Puleng
- Mogau/Magao
- Lebogang
- Mpho
- Lesedi
- Kabelo
- sentebale

==== Zimbabwe ====
Shona, a Bantu group in Zimbabwe, have unisex names which may indicate the circumstances of the baby or the family during the time of the birth. All Shona names have a meaning, some also celebrate virtue or worship God.

=== West Africa ===
- Abimbola
- Ade
- Anan
- Ayo
- Chidi
- Chike
- Dayo
- Efe
- Tolu
- Nana
- Imani
- Ekei
- Bassey
- Offiong
- Obo
- Ife A Nigerian given name meaning 'Love'.

== Asian ==
=== Arabic ===
- Amal
- Amani
- Barakah
- Chadi
- Diya
- Farah
- Ikram
- Imani
- Ismat
- Kanan
- Kawthar
- Laden
- Malak
- Nakia
- Nima
- Naseem, Nasim, Nassim, Nessim
- Noor
- Qamar
- Rasha
- Rayan
- Shams
- Sultan
- Wafaa
- Zain
- Zia

=== Armenian ===
- Arshaluys (Արշալույս)
- Artsvik (Արծվիկ)
- Nairi / Nayiri (Նաիրի, Նայիրի)
- Hayastan (Հայաստան)

=== Chinese ===
Chinese given names are composed of 1–3 Chinese characters, with the exception of non-Han ethnic groups who sometimes choose to use their native naming traditions instead and transliterate their names to Chinese for legal registration, often ending up in very long Chinese full names. Some characters have masculine connotations tied to them (for example, 偉 (wěi), 冠 (guàn), 宏 (hóng), 廷 (tíng), 傑 (jié), 豪 (háo)), some have feminine connotations (for example, 娟 (juān), 妍 (yán), 淑 (shú), 卉 (huì), 晴 (qíng), 薇 (wéi)), and some can be fully gender-neutral or will only gain a masculine/feminine leaning when paired with another character that has a specific leaning (for example, 家 (jiā), 安 (ān), 子 (zǐ), 文 (wén), 品 (pǐn), 華 (huá)). Some Chinese given names may have the same pronunciation, but use different characters associated with different genders to give the name a gender association.

=== Hebrew ===
Many of the modern Hebrew names have become unisex and are suitable for both boys and girls. Some popular examples are:

- Adar
- Adi
- Almog
- Amit
- Ariel
- Asher
- Aviv
- Bar
- Be'eri
- Chen (sometimes written as Hen / Khen)
- Daniel (which is unisex only as a modern name)
- Dar
- Dor
- Doron
- Eden
- Elia (unisex form of Elijah)
- Gal
- Gili
- Hadar
- Idan (which is unisex only as a modern name)
- Jael
- Keshet
- Liel
- Lior
- Liron
- Maayan (sometimes written as Ma'ayan)
- Maor
- Matan (which is unisex only as a modern name)
- Mor
- Moran
- Neri
- Noam
- Omer (which is unisex only as a modern name)
- Ophir (sometimes written as Ofir)
- Ori / Or
- Peleg (which is unisex only as a modern name)
- Rani
- Raz
- Rony (sometimes written as Roni)
- Rotem
- Sahar
- Shahar (sometimes written as Shachar)
- Shani
- Sharon
- Shay (sometimes written as Shai)
- Shiloh
- Simcha
- Stav
- Tal
- Tom (which is unisex only as a modern name)
- Tomer (which is unisex only as a modern name)
- Yarden (Hebrew form of Jordan)
- Yona (Hebrew form of Jonah)
- Yuval
- Ziv
- Zohar

=== Indian languages ===
Many Indian names become unisex when written with Latin characters because of the limitations of transliteration. The spellings Chandra and Krishna, for example, are transliterations of both the masculine and feminine versions of those names. In Indian languages, the final a in each of these names are different letters with different pronunciations, so there is no ambiguity. However, when they are seen (and usually, spoken) by someone unfamiliar with Indian languages, they become sexually ambiguous. Other Indian names, such as Ananda, are exclusively or nearly exclusively masculine in India, but because of their a ending, are assumed to be feminine in Anglophone societies.

Nehal, Sonal, Sonu, Snehal, Niral, Pranjal and Anmol are used commonly to name baby boys or girls in western states of India such as Gujarat. Similarly, names like Kajal, Sujal, Viral, Harshal, Deepal, Bobby, Mrinal, Jyoti, Shakti, Nilam, Kiran, Lucky, Ashwini, Shashi, Malhar, Umang, Shubham and Anupam are also very common sex-neutral names or unisex names in India. Most Punjabi Sikh first names such as "Sandeep, Gurdeep, Kuldeep, Mandeep", "Surjeet, Gurjeet, Kuljeet, Harjeet, Manjeet", "Harpreet, Gurpreet, Jaspreet, Kulpreet, Manpreet", "Prabhjot, Harjot, Gurjot, Jasjot" and "Sukhjinder, Bhupinder, Jasbinder, Parminder, Kulvinder, Harjinder, Ranjodh, Sheeraz, Hardeep, Kirandeep, Sukhdeep, Govindpal, Encarl, Rajan" are unisex names and equally commonly given to either sex. Also, names derived from Dari Persian and Arabic, but not used among native speakers of those languages, are common among South Asian Muslims. Since Persian does not assign genders to inanimate nouns, some of these names are gender-neutral, for example Roshan, Hitesh, Sudesh, Parveen, and Insaaf.

=== Indonesian ===
- Ade
- Ananda
- Ari
- Aulia
- Bintang
- Chandra
- Dana
- Deva
- Dian: lamp
- Dika
- Dwi
- Eka: first born
- Feby
- Kiki
- Lintang
- Nana
- Nanda
- Nur
- Reza
- Riski
- Suryana
- Tri
- Wahyu
- Yana
- Yani

=== Japanese ===
Despite there being only a small number of Japanese unisex names in use, unisex names are widely popular. Many high-profile Japanese celebrities such as Hikaru Utada, Jun Matsumoto, Ryo Nishikido, and Izumi Sakai have unisex names.

Many of the entries in the following list, in Roman characters, each represent more than one name, with different meanings, which are often distinguished by the use of different kanji characters.

- Aki
- Akira
- Amane
- Aoi
- Asuka
- Ataru
- Chiaki
- Haru
- Haruka
- Harumi
- Hikari
- Hikaru
- Hiromi
- Hitomi
- Hinata
- Izumi
- Jun
- Juri
- Kaede
- Kaoru
- Katsumi
- Kazumi
- Kei
- Kiara
- Kohaku
- Makoto
- Masami
- Michi
- Mikoto
- Mirai
- Mitsuki
- Nagisa
- Nao
- Naomi
- Natsuki
- Nikko
- Rei
- Ren
- Riku
- Rin
- Ryou (Ryoo, Ryō)
- Satsuki
- Shinobu
- Shizuka
- Shou (Shoo, Shō)
- Sora
- Tomomi
- Tsubasa
- Tsukasa
- Yutaka
- Yuu (Yu, Yū)
- Yuuki (Yuki, Yūki)
- Yoshi

==== Nicknames ====
Unisex names may also be used as nicknames. For example, a man named Ryounosuke and a woman named Ryouko may both use the unisex name Ryou as a nickname.

=== Kazakh ===
Unisex names in Kazakhstan are not rare. About 555 000 (4,11%) Kazakh people in Kazakhstan have 617 unisex names with 10% threshold.

=== Korean ===
All Korean names are unisex (ungendered), but some names are more commonly given to boys and other more commonly to girls.

=== Persian ===
- Arya
- Azar
- Dana
- Nikan
- Nima
- Tiam
- Yara

=== Turkish ===
There are many Turkish names which are unisex. These names are almost always pure Turkish names (i.e. not Turkified Arabic names that have an Islamic connotation) that derive from Turkish words. These names may either be modern names or be derived from Turkic mythology. Some Persian-derived Turkish names, like Can and Cihan, are also unisex, as are even a few Arabic-derived names, like İhsan and Nur.

Among the common examples of the many unisex names in Turkey are:

- Aytaç
- Ayhan
- Bilge
- Cemre
- Derya
- Deniz
- Duygu
- Elvan
- Esen
- Eser
- Evrim
- Göksel
- Göksu
- Günay
- İlkay
- Olcay
- Özgür
- Sultan
- Tutku
- Ufuk
- Utku
- Umut
- Yağmur
- Yüksel
- Yücel

=== Vietnamese ===
Among modern Vietnamese names, unisex names are very popular. Vietnamese people may distinguish unisex names by middle names. For example, Quốc Khánh may be a male name (Quốc is a male name) and Ngân Khánh may be a female name (Ngân is a female name), and sex-specific middle names such as Văn for males and Thị for females also help. In many cases, a male could have a female name and vice versa. Popular examples of unisex names in Vietnamese are:

- Anh (beautiful, outstanding, hero)
- An (safe and sound)
- Bình (peaceful)
- Châu (pearl)
- Dương (light, sun)
- Giang (big river)
- Hà (river)
- Hải (sea)
- Khánh (joyful celebration, bell)
- Linh (divinity, essence, spirit, soul)
- Nhân (kindness, humanity)
- Thanh (clear, pure, distinct, youth, young, cyan)
- Tú (elegant, talented person)
- Tường (wise, luck)
- Sang (bright, luxurious)

== European ==
=== Basque ===
Euskaltzaindia, the official academic language regulatory institution which watches over the Basque language, has a list of unisex names. Some of them are:

- Alai
- Amaiur
- Amets
- Aran
- Bidatz
- Ekai
- Elur
- Iraultza
- Izar
- Joar

=== Serbo-Croatian ===
- Matija (generally male, but female in the Neretva region)
- Saša (a nickname of Aleksandar/Aleksandra)
- Vanja
- Minja
- Borna
- Sandi (a nickname of Aleksandar/Aleksandra)

=== Czech ===
Up until December 31, 2021, the Czech Registry Act forbade giving male names or surnames to females or female names or surnames to males, but did not restrict neutral names and surnames. As of January 1, 2022, females are now allowed to request a male surname for themselves or for their children without any additional paperwork. For the period of transitioning, the Act explicitly allows the use of gender-neutral given names and surnames.

As of July 2023, the MVČR or Internal Ministry of the Czech Republic, officially released a list of 4,000 gender-neutral names that can be used by citizens, particularly aimed toward transgender people needing a gender neutral name during their transition (or otherwise a name that does not require a legal gender change to use).

=== Dutch ===
This is a list of the 20 most common names of which at least 10% are of the other sex. The most popular names are at the top.

- Anne (to be exact: a boy's name in the West Frisian language, a girl's name in Dutch)
- Robin
- Willy
- Sam
- Nicky
- Marijn
- Dominique
- Luca
- Bo
- Jentje
- Jos
- Senna
- Jamie
- Ali
- Indy
- Dani
- Henny
- Ruth
- Eliza
- Jaimy

=== Finnish ===
Finnish law forbids giving a female name to a male child and a male name to a female child among other restrictions. Some names do exist that have been given to children of both genders. Such unisex names were more common in the first half of the 20th century. This is an incomplete list:

- Aala
- Airut
- Aleksa
- Alvi
- Ara
- Ariel
- Asla
- Dana
- Eedi
- Eelia
- Eeri
- Eka
- Ensi
- Ervi
- Hani
- Heile
- Helgi
- Helle
- Ilo
- Jessi
- Kaari
- Kaiho
- Karli
- Karo
- Kullero
- Lahja
- Lemmi
- Lumo
- Lumi
- Marin
- Mietti
- Miska
- Mitja
- Muisto
- Niika
- Niki
- Nilla
- Noe
- Oma
- Orla
- Petja
- Pii
- Rani
- Reine
- Reita
- Sana
- Sani
- Sassa
- Sirius
- Soini
- Soma
- Sävel
- Tehi
- Tiera
- Toive
- Vanja
- Venni
- Vieno
- Viivi
- Vilka

Many of these names are rare, foreign or neologisms; established names tend to be strongly sex-specific. Notably, a class of names that are derived from nature can be often used for either sex, for example: Aalto (wave), Halla (frost), Lumi (snow), Paju (willow), Ruska (fall colors), and Valo (light). Similarly, there are some (sometimes archaic) adjectives which carry no strong gender connotations, like Kaino (timid), Vieno (calm) or Lahja (a gift). Certain names can have unisex diminutives, such as Alex, which can be short for Aleksandra or Aleksanteri (or variants thereof).

=== French ===
Popular unisex names of French origin include:

- Adél
- Alex
- Alix
- Amour
- Anne
- Avril
- Audrey
- Beau
- Camille
- Candide
- Céleste
- Claude
- Cyrille
- Dominique
- Faby
- Hyacinthe
- Jade
- Jean (female), Jean (male)
- Jocelyn
- Lillian
- Loïs
- Louison
- Marron
- Maxime
- Compound names with Marie
- Narcisse
- Odet
- Placide
- René
- Sam
- Stéphane
- Yannick

There are also pairs of masculine and feminine names that have slightly different spellings but identical pronunciation, such as André / Andrée, Frédéric / Frédérique, René / Renée and Gabriel / Gabrielle. In France and French-speaking countries, it can happen for people to have a combination of both masculine and feminine given names, but most of these include "Marie", such as Jean-Marie, Marie-Jean, Marie-Pierre. Marie was a unisex name in medieval times; it is nowadays only female except for its presence in compound names. Notable examples of people with a combination of masculine and feminine given names are Jean-Marie Le Pen (male), Marie-Jean Hérault de Séchelles (male), Marie-Pierre Kœnig (male), and Marie-Pierre Leray (female). In the past, it was not unusual to give a child that was assigned male at birth the middle name Marie as a sign of religious devotion; the most notable example is that of François Maurice Marie Mitterrand.

European royals often bear the name Marie, the French form of Maria, in their names. Prince Amedeo of Belgium, Archduke of Austria-Este (Amedeo Marie Joseph Carl Pierre Philippe Paola Marcus), Prince Jean of Luxembourg (Jean Félix Marie Guillaume), and Jean, Grand Duke of Luxembourg (Jean Benoît Guillaume Robert Antoine Louis Marie Adolphe Marc) are examples of male royals who bear Marie in their names.

=== German ===
In the past, German law required parents to give their child a sex-specific name. In 2008 the Federal Constitutional Court of Germany ruled that under certain circumstances this cannot be enforced, even if the child has only one given name. The custom of adding a second name which matches the child's legal sex is no longer required. Still, unisex names of German origin are rare, most of them being nicknames rather than formal names (such as Alex).

Examples of unisex names include:

- Eike
- Gustl (the male variant is a shortening of August or Gustav, the female for Augusta)
- Kai
- Kim
- Lennox
- Luca
- Micha
- Michi
- Mika
- Niko
- Sascha
- Sigi
- Toni
- Ulli
- Willy

=== Greek ===
- Bronte
- Cyril
- Dorian
- Eris
- Haris
- Kyrie
- Nyx
- Orion
- Paris (given name)

=== Icelandic ===
In June, 2019, Iceland's Parliament, the Althing, passed a new gender autonomy act which will recognize all approved Icelandic names as unisex.

Previously, unisex names were in generally illegal in Iceland. The Icelandic Naming Committee (Icelandic: Mannanafnanefnd) maintained preapproved lists of male and female names, with names not on the list - or on a different gender's list - typically denied. Earlier court cases had carved out exceptions, such as the names Blær (approved for women after a 2013 court case), Auður (approved for men later in 2013), and Alex (denied for women in 2013 but approved in 2018).

Additionally, the new gender autonomy act makes changes to the traditional patronymics/matronymics used as Icelandic surnames. Before the bill, Icelandic last names (by law) could not be unisex: the suffix -dóttir ("daughter") was attached to a parent's name for women and the suffix -son ("son") was used for men. The new law will allow adults who have officially changed their gender marker to "X", a non-binary gender marker, to also change their patronymic/matronymic suffix to -bur ("child"). Newborns cannot be assigned a non-binary gender marker, and will continue to receive a patronymic/matronymic suffix in keeping with their assigned sex at birth.

=== Irish ===
- Ailbhe
- Aran
- Brogan
- Carey
- Carling
- Casey
- Finley
- Flann
- Flannery
- Kerry
- Naoise
- Nollaig
- Riley/Reilly
- Ryan
- Shannon
- Shea
- Sláine
- Teagan
- Tierney

Among Irish Catholics in the 19th and 20th centuries, it was not unusual to give a child that was assigned male at birth a feminine middle name, particularly "Mary", as a sign of religious devotion. Joseph Mary Plunkett was a signatory of the Irish Declaration of Independence in 1916, and was later executed as one of the leaders of the Easter Rising.

=== Italian ===
In Italy, unisex names (nomi ambigenere) are very rare. There are names that are primarily male, like Andrea (which is female, e.g., in English, Spanish, German, and French) or Felice, that can also be given to females. Names like Celeste, Amabile, Fiore or Diamante are, as opposite, female names that occasionally can be given to males.

Sometimes "Maria" is used as a middle male name (such as Antonio Maria).

"Loreto" (feminine "Loreta" or "Loretta") and "Rosario" (feminine: "Rosaria") are male names in Italian whereas in Spanish they are female.

There are also unisex nicknames, for example:

- Giusi or Giusy can stand either for Giuseppe ("Joseph") or Giuseppina ("Josephine").
- Dani or Dany can stand for Daniele (male) or Daniela (female).
- Ale or Alex can stand for Alessandro (male) or Alessandra (female).
- Fede can stand either for Federico or Federica.

=== Portuguese ===
- Carmo
- Cruz
- Duda

==== Brazilian ====
Names that end with an i are considered unisex in Brazil. They tend to be Native Brazilian Indigenous names in origin, such as Araci, Jaci, Darci, Ubirani, but names from other cultures are now being absorbed, such as Remy, Wendy, and Eddy. Names that end with ir and mar tend to be unisex also, such as Nadir, Aldenir, Dagmar and Niomar – though in these cases there are some exceptions.

=== Russian ===
Unisex names are not common in Russian, partly because of the grammar of the Russian language in which gendered endings are assigned to most names of Slavic, Greek, Latin or Biblical origin, however, diminutive forms of names in Russian language can be unisex, such as Sasha/Shura (Alexandr or Alexandra), Zhenya (Yevgeniy or Yevgeniya), Valya (Valentin or Valentina), Valera (Valeriy or Valeriya), Slava (for names ending with -slav or -slava), Vitalya (Vitaly or Vitalia).

It's worth noting that it's extremely uncommon to use the diminutive form as an official name (in passports, birth certificates etc.) as these are considered informal and seen as inappropriate for use in a formal capacity.

Those who desire gender neutral names often borrow them from other languages, most commonly the Tatar language which offers more options than the Russian language.

=== Slovene ===
- Fran (diminutive of Frančiška)
- Ivica (diminutive of Ivan (John) or Ivana (Joanne))
- Saša (diminutive of Aleksander (Alexander))
- Slava (diminutive of Slavko)
- Vanja (diminutive of Ivan or Ivana)
- Sandi (diminutive of Aleksander (Alexander))
- Aljoša (diminutive of Aleksander (Alexander))

=== Spanish ===
In Spanish, unisex names are rare. Some names for devotional titles of the virgin Mary, such as Guadalupe, Trinidad and Reyes are used for both genders, although more often by women. Epicene names from Basque are sometimes used in non-Basque speaking regions of Spain. Other names adapted from English, French or Hebrew can also be used as unisex. Some names include:

- Amable
- Alexis
- Amor
- Ares (Note: Male after the Greek god, female after Our Lady of Ares.)
- Arián
- Ariel
- Buenaventura
- Carmen
- Consuelo
- Corpus
- Cruz
- Dayán
- Denís
- Édel
- Edén
- Eliécer
- Eleazar
- Evangelista
- Gael
- García
- Génesis
- Guadalupe
- Himar
- Índigo
- Irian
- Iriome
- Ivón
- Marián
- Nazaret
- Nadir
- Neftalí
- Noel
- Práxedes
- Ramos
- René
- Reyes
- Río
- Rosario
- Santos
- Sinaí
- Sol
- Trinidad
- Ventura
- Yael
- Yarel
- Yeray

Like in English, some common nicknames are unisex such as Álex (Alejandro, Alejandra), Cris (Cristina, Cristian, Cristóbal), Dani (Daniel, Daniela) and Gabi (Gabriel, Gabriela).

=== Swedish ===
Swedish unisex names generally follow the tradition as in similar Western countries, including names such as Robin, Kim, Lou and Lee. Unisex names that are particularly Swedish include Mio, after the popular Astrid Lindgren book Mio, my son, and Tintin, after the popularity of the Belgian comics character. A more traditional unisex name is Kaj, the male variant might be a Continental loan through Danish, whereas the female variant might be a shortening of Kajsa, from Katarina.

== English-speaking world ==
Unisex names have been enjoying some popularity in English-speaking countries in the past several decades. Masculine names become unisex or feminine names more often than the other way around.

Unisex names include:

- Addison
- Adel
- Al
- Alex
- Alexis
- Ali, Alli
- Alix
- Alison, Allison, Allyson
- Ally, Allie, Alley
- Allyn
- Alva
- Andy
- Angel
- Arden
- Ariel
- Ari
- Arlie
- Ash
- Asher
- Ashton
- Ashley
- Apple
- Aston
- Aspen
- Aubrey
- Audie
- Audrey (strongly female-leaning)
- Avery
- Avie
- Avis
- Abby, Abbey
- Ainsley
- Banks
- Bailey
- Beverly
- Bev
- Bentley
- Benny
- Bernie, Berny, Berni
- Berry
- Beryl
- Bexley
- Billy (mostly male), Billie (mostly female)
- Blaze
- Blake
- Blaine, Blane
- Blair
- Blue
- Bliss
- Bobby (mostly male), Bobbi (mostly female)
- Brett
- Brennan
- Brandy
- Brownie
- Brooke (mostly female), Brook (mostly male)
- Brooklyn, Brooklin
- Bryce
- Bryn
- Calvin
- Campbell
- Cameron, Kameron, Camryn
- Cammy
- Cam, Kam
- Camille
- Carol, Carroll, Carrol, Caryl, Caryll, Karyl
- Carey, Cary
- Carson, Carsen
- Carmen, Carman, Karmen
- Casey, Kasey
- Cassidy
- Cass
- Cashmere
- Chandler
- Channing
- Charlie, Charley, Charly, Charli, Charlee
- Chase
- Chelsea
- Cheyenne
- Chris, Cris, Kris
- Chrissy
- Christy
- Christian
- Collins
- Cody
- Coby
- Connie
- Corrie, Corry, Cory
- Cordy
- Cosmo
- Courtney
- Cecil
- Cedric
- Cree, Kree
- Cleo
- Claire, Clare
- Dakota
- Dallas
- Dale, Dayle
- Danny, Dannie (mostly male), Danni, Dani (mostly female), Denny (mostly male)
- Dana, Dayna
- Darby
- Darcy, D'arcy
- Darian, Darien
- Darryl
- Dawson
- Delaney, Delanie
- Dell, Del
- Devin, Devyn, Devon, Devan
- Derby
- Dee
- Dominique
- Drew, Dru, Drue
- Duncan
- Dylan
- Diamond
- Eden
- Elisha
- Elis, Ellis, Ellyse, Ellice
- Ellison
- Elliot
- Ellie
- Ellery
- Ember
- Emerson
- Emery, Emory
- Emmett
- Erin
- Ev
- Evan
- Evelyn
- Everly
- Esmé
- Finley
- Florence (strongly female-leaning)
- Florenz
- Flower
- Fran
- Frankie
- Freddy, Freddie, Freddi
- Gail, Gale, Gayle
- Gay, Gaye
- Garnet
- Gaelan, Gaelen, Galen
- Gabby
- Gerry, Gerrie (mostly male), Gerri (mostly female)
- Georgie
- Gene
- Gill
- Gussie
- Greer
- Glenn
- Gwyn, Gwynn, Gwynne
- Gwen (mostly male in France and mostly female in Wales)
- Haven
- Hadley
- Halsey
- Harley, Harlee
- Harlow
- Harrison
- Harper
- Harmony
- Hayes
- Hayden, Haiden
- Hayley, Hailey, Haley, Halley
- Hale
- Hilary, Hillary
- Hero
- Hennie
- Hope
- Hollis
- Holliday, Holiday
- Hunter
- Ivy, Ivey, Ivie
- Ivory
- Iggy
- Izzy
- Indigo
- Jacy, Jacey
- Jack
- Jackie, Jacki
- Jamie, Jamey, Jaime, Jaimie, Jayme
- Jay, Jaye, Jai, Jae
- Jaylon
- Jayden, Jaden, Jadyn
- Jade
- Jazz
- Jean (female), Jean (male)
- Jensen
- Jerry, Jeri
- Jeryl, Jeryn
- Jess, Jes
- Jesse (mostly male), Jessie, Jessy, Jessey (unisex), Jessi (mostly female)
- Jewel, Jewell
- Jo
- Jocelyn
- Joey
- Jodie, Jody
- Jordan
- Jordy, Jordie
- Joy, Joie
- Journey
- Jude
- June
- Junie
- Juniper
- Jupiter
- Justice (mostly male)
- Kai, Kye
- Kay
- Kayle
- Kary, Karey
- Keegan
- Kelly, Kelley
- Kelsey
- Kendall
- Kennedy
- Kenzie
- Kerry
- Kim, Kym
- Kimberly
- Kirby
- Kira
- Kit
- Kinsley
- Kristen
- Kyrie
- Kyle
- Lacy, Lacey, Lacie, Laci
- Lake
- Lane
- Landy
- Larkin
- Lavern, Laverne
- Laurel
- Laurie
- Lee, Leigh
- Leighton
- Lenny
- Lennox
- Lennon
- Leslie, Lesley
- Les
- Lex
- Liberty
- Lin, Linn, Lyn, Lynn
- Lindsay, Lindsey
- Lindy
- Linden
- Logan
- London
- Loren, Lauren (mostly female), Lorne (mostly male)
- Lou
- Louie (strongly male-leaning)
- Lyndon
- Mandy, Mandi
- Mackenzie
- Madison, Maddison
- Maddox, Madox
- Mallory
- Marian, Marion
- Marin
- Marley, Marlee
- Marlo
- Marlowe
- Marshal
- Marvel
- Marty, Martie, Marti
- Max
- Maxie
- Matty, Mattie
- Maverick
- McKinley
- Meade
- Mel
- Meredith
- Merle
- Merlyn
- Merrill, Merril
- Merritt
- Merry
- Mickey, Micky, Mickie, Micki, Mikki, Miki
- Miley
- Misha, Mischa
- Monroe
- Montana
- Morgan
- Morley
- Murphy
- Nevada
- Nat
- Nic
- Nicola
- Nicky, Nickey (mostly male), Nickie, Nicki, Nikki, Niki (mostly female)
- Noah, Noa
- Nova
- Noel
- Norrie
- Ocean
- Oakley
- Odell
- Odie
- Ollie, Olly
- Opal
- Paisley
- Paige, Page
- Palmer
- Paris, Parris
- Parker
- Patrice
- Pat
- Patty, Patti (mostly female)
- Patsy
- Paxton
- Payton, Peyton
- Pearl
- Perry, Perrey, Perrie, Perri, Parry
- Pepper
- Presley
- Piper
- Pinkie
- Phoenix
- Posy, Posey, Posie
- Quinn
- Quincy
- Raleigh
- Raven
- Ray (mostly male), Rae (mostly female), Rea
- Randy (mostly male), Randi (mostly female)
- Reagan, Regan
- Reggie
- Rennie, Renny
- Renée (mostly female), René (mostly male)
- Rémy
- Rebel
- Reese, Reece
- Reed
- Ricky, Rickey (mostly male), Rickie, Ricki, Riki, Rikki (unisex)
- Riley
- Ridley
- Ripley
- River
- Robin (mostly male in the UK, mostly female in the US), Robyn
- Robbie
- Rory, Rorie, Rori
- Ronnie, Ronny, Roni
- Roma
- Romilly
- Romy
- Rowan, Rowen
- Royce
- Rudy
- Russi
- Rutherford
- Ryan (strongly male-leaning), Ryann (strongly female-leaning), Rhyan
- Ryder
- Rylan
- Rynn
- Sage
- Sam
- Sammy, Sammie, Sammi
- Sandy, Sandie, Sandi
- Sasha (mostly female), Sacha (mostly male), Sascha (unisex)
- Sawyer
- Sal
- Sky, Skye
- Skyler, Skylar, Schuyler
- Scotty, Scottie
- Scout
- Selby
- Sharon
- Shane
- Shannon
- Shawn, Shaun, Shon
- Shay, Shaye, Shai, Shae, Shea
- Shelby
- Shelley, Shelly
- Sherrill
- Shirl
- Shirley, Sherley
- Shiloh
- Silver
- Sidney (mostly male), Sydney (mostly female)
- Sid, Syd, Cyd
- Spencer
- Stacy, Stacey
- Stef, Steph
- Stevie
- Storm
- Stormie, Stormy
- Storme
- Sutton
- Summer
- Sunny
- Sloane
- Taran
- Tate
- Tatum
- Taylor, Tayler
- Tegan
- Temple
- Terry (mostly male), Terri (mostly female)
- Tenley
- Teal, Teale
- Tommie, Tommy
- Tony (mostly male), Toni (mostly female)
- Tori, Tory, Torrey, Torry, Torrie
- Torrance
- Trace
- Tracy, Tracey
- Tyler (strongly male-leaning)
- Valentine
- Vale
- Val
- Viv
- Vivian (mostly female), Vivien (mostly male)
- Wallis
- Waverly
- Willy, Willie, Willey
- Win
- Winnie
- Winter
- Wynn, Wynne
- Whitney
- Woodrow
- Wren
- Xan
- Yancy

In the United States, some of the above-mentioned male names are now largely female, while in Britain, they remain largely male. Sometimes different spellings have different sex distributions (Francis is less likely female than Frances), but these are rarely definitive. For example, in the US, as of 2016, both Skylar and Skyler are more common for females, but Skylar is most strongly associated with females (the 42nd most common name for females and the 761 most common for males born in 2016) than Skyler (the 359 most common name for females and the 414 most common for males born in 2016).

=== Origin ===
Modern unisex names may derive from:

- Nature (Lake, Rain/Raine, Sky/Skye, Willow, Terra, River, Ocean, Juniper, Ash, Darnel, Aspen, Linden, Winter, Cloud, Snow, Cedar, Sequoia, Lightning, Sorrel, Aderyn, Barkley)
- Colors (Blue, Gray/Grey, Indigo, Emerald, Cyan, Navy, Crimson, Onyx, Azure, Teal, Alba, Umber, Garnet, Jade)
- Places (Dakota, India, Indiana, Montana, London, Brooklyn, Ireland, Rio, Egypt, Windsor, Texas, Sydney)
- Metals (Silver, Gold/Goldie, Bronze, Platinum)
- Surnames (Parker, Mackenzie, Madison, Kennedy, Oakley, McKenna, Ashton, Lincoln, Maxwell, Easton, Daley/Daly, Marin, Keegan, Aniston, Shaw, Sinclair, Adair, Monet)
- Animals (Fox, Fennec, Robin, Phoenix, Wren, Raven, Sparrow, Leo, Roan, Dove, Lark)
- Months (January, March, April, May, June, August, September, October)
- Directions (North, West)
- Food (Apple, Kale, Saffron, Clove)
- Pop culture:
  - Books (Esme, Logan, Pepper, Rey, Rogue)
  - Film and television (Harley Quinn, Ivy, Onix)
  - Video games (Luca, Marluxia, Riku/Rikku, Ryu, Sora, Wynne)
- Words (Haven, Justice, Journey, Gentry, Honor, Sunny, Happy, Heaven, Rebel, Wisdom, Lyric)
- Astronomy and mythology (Altair, Leo, Orion, Juno)
- Jewels (Diamond, Jade, Emerald, Pearl)

Examples of unisex names among celebrities and their children are:

- Ashton (Ashton Kutcher and Ashton Shepherd)
- Brooklyn (Brooklyn Beckham and Brooklyn Decker)
- Bryce (Bryce Papenbrook and Bryce Dallas Howard)
- Cameron (Cameron Crowe and Cameron Diaz)
- Devon (Devon Bostick and Devon Aoki)
- Drew (Drew Seeley and Drew Barrymore)
- Dylan (Dylan Walsh and Dylan Penn)
- Evan (Evan Peters and Evan Rachel Wood)
- Genesis (Genesis Servania and Genesis Rodriguez)
- Hayden (Hayden Christensen and Hayden Panettiere)
- Jamie (Jamie Bell and Jamie Lee Curtis)
- Jordan (Jordan Knight and Jordan Pruitt)
- Kirby (Kirby Morrow and Kirby Bliss Blanton)
- Leighton (Leighton Baines and Leighton Meester)
- Mel (Mel Gibson and Mel B)
- Michael (Michael Keaton and Michael Learned)
- Morgan (Morgan Freeman and Morgan Fairchild)
- Noah (Noah Hathaway and Noah Lindsey Cyrus)
- Peyton (Peyton Manning and Peyton List)
- Rebel (Rebel Rodriguez and Rebel Wilson)
- Remy (Remy Hii and Remy Ryan)
- Ryan (Ryan Reynolds and Ryan Simpkins)
- Robin (Robin Williams and Robin Wright)
- Rowan (Rowan Atkinson and Rowan Blanchard)
- Sidney (Sidney Crosby and Sydney Leroux)
- Spencer (Spencer Tracy and Spencer Grammer)
- Taylor (Taylor Lautner and Taylor Swift)
- Tracy (Tracy Morgan and Tracy Chapman)

According to the Social Security Administration, Jayden has been the most popular unisex name for boys since 2008 and Madison has been the most popular unisex name for girls since 2000 in the United States. Prior to Jayden, Logan was the most popular unisex name for boys and prior to Madison, Alexis was the most popular unisex name for girls.

=== Nicknames ===
Many popular nicknames are unisex. Some nicknames, such as Alex and Pat, have become popular as given names in their own right. The following list of unisex nicknames are most commonly seen in English-speaking countries such as Canada, the United States, Australia, New Zealand, South Africa, and the United Kingdom.

- Addie, Adi, Addi, Addy – Adam, Adelaide, Adele, Adrian, Adrien, Addison
- Adri – Adrian, Adriana, Adrienne
- Alec, Aleck, Alex, Alexi – Alexander, Alexandra, Alexis, Alexandria, Alexa, Alexius, Alexia
- Al, Ali, Allie, Aly – Albert, Alberta, Alexander, Alexandra, Alexandria, Alexis, Alexa, Alexius, Alexia, Alfred, Alice, Alison, Almira, Alistair, Alister, Alpha, Alyssa
- Andi, Andie, Andy – Andrea, Andre, Andrew
- Angie – Angelo, Angela, Angelina, Angelica, Angel, Angus
- Annie – Anna, Anne, Annette, Andrea, Angela, Andre, Andrew, Angelo, Angelina, Angelica, Angus
- Ari – Aria, Ariana, Ariane, Arianna, Ariano, Ariel, Ariela, Ariella
- Arlie – Arleen, Arlene, Arline, Arlington
- Ash, Ashe – Ashelia, Asher, Ashford, Ashley, Ashlyn, Ashton
- Audry – Audric, Audria, Audrea, Audrey
- Avie – Ava, Avanel, Avery, Avis
- Bennie, Benny, Bernie, Berny – Benedict, Bennett, Benjamin, Bernadette, Bernard, Bernice, Ebenezer
- Bert, Berti, Bertie, Berty – Albert, Alberta, Hubert, Gilbert, Herbert, Alberto, Wilbert, Robert, Roberta, Roberto
- Bill, Billie, Billy – Belinda, William, Willard, Wilma, Wilhelmina, Willow
- Bo – Beaufort, Beauregard, Bonita, Bonnie, Robert
- Bob, Bobbi, Bobbie, Bobby – Robert, Roberta, Roberto
- Cade, Caed, Kade – Caden, Cadence
- Cam, Cammie, Cammy, Kam, Kammy – Cameron, Camilla, Camille
- Car, Kar – Carmen, Carolina, Caroline, Carsen, Carson, Cary, Caryss, Karolina, Karoline, Kary, Karyss
- Cass, Cassi, Cassie, Cassy – Caspar, Casper, Cassandra, Cassian, Cassidy, Cassius
- Charli, Charlie, Charley – Charlene, Charles, Charlotte, Charlize
- Chris, Chrissy, Christi, Christie, Christy – Christian, Christina, Christianna, Christianne, Christine, Christoph, Christophe, Christopher
- Cid, Cyd, Sid, Syd – Cidney, Cydney, Sidney, Sidra, Sydelle, Sydney, Sydra
- Clem – Clement, Clementine, Clementina, Clemency
- Cleo – Cleon, Cleopatra
- Cobie, Coby, Koby – Cobalt, Coburn, Jacob, Jacoba
- Connie – Conner, Conrad, Constance, Cornelia, Cornelius, Cornell
- Cor, Corie, Corrie, Corry, Cory, Kori, Korie, Kory – Cornelia, Cornelius, Coriander, Corin, Corina, Corrina, Corwin, Koriander, Korina, Korrina, Korwin
- Dale – Daley, Daly
- Dan, Dani, Danni, Dannie, Danny – Daniel, Danielle, Daniela
- Dash – Dashiell, Dasha
- D, Dee – David, Deanna, Deanne, Dee Dee
- Del, Dell – Delano, Delbert, Delita, Della, Delta, Delvon, Derek, Odell
- Dom – Domenic, Domenica, Dominic, Dominica, Dominique
- Don, Donnie, Donny – Donald, Donatella, Donatello, Donna
- Dusty – Dustin
- Ed, Edd, Eddi, Eddie, Eddy – Edgar, Edmund, Edward, Edwin, Edwina
- El, Ell, Ellie – Elle, Ellia, Elliot, Ellis
- Em – Emery, Emil, Emma, Emmett, Emmie, Emmy
- Ev, Evie – Eva, Evan, Evanne, Eve, Evelyn, Everett
- Fran – Frances, Francis, Francesca, Francesco, Francisco, Francisca, Francine
- Frank, Franki, Frankie, Franky – Frances, Francis, Francesca, Francesco, Francine, Franklin
- Franni, Frannie, Franny – Frances, Francis, Francesca, Francesco, Francine
- Fred, Freddi, Freddie, Freddy – Freda, Frederick, Frederica, Alfred, Manfred, Freida
- Gab, Gabbi, Gabbie, Gabby, Gabi – Gabriel, Gabriella, Gabrielle
- Gay – Gabriel, Gaylen, Gaylene, Gaylord, Gaynell, Gaynor
- Gem, Jem – Gema, Gemara, Gemarah, Gemma, James, Jeremiah, Jemma, Jemima, Jemina, Jeremy
- Gene – Eugene, Eugenia, Eugenie, Geena
- Georgie – George, Georges, Georgiana, Georgette, Georgia, Georgina
- Geri, Gerrie, Gerry, Jeri, Jerry – Gerald, Geraldine, Gerard, Jeremiah, Jeremy, Jerome
- Gert – Gerta, Gerti, Gertie, Gertrud, Gertruda, Gertrude, Gerty
- Gill – Gilbert, Gillian, Gilly
- Hal – Hala, Halbert, Hallie, Harold
- Harry, Harri – Harold, Harrison, Harriet
- Hay – Hannah, Hayden, Hayley
- Hennie – Hendrik, Hendrika, Hendrikus
- Iggie, Iggy – Ignacio, Ignatius
- Indy – Indiana, Indigo
- Issy, Iz, Izzi, Izzie, Izzy – Isaac, Isabel, Isabella, Isabelle, Isadora, Isidore, Isolde, Elizabeth
- Jacki, Jackie, Jacky – Jack, Jackson, Jacqueline, John
- Jan – Janet, Janice, Janis, John
- Jazz – Jasmin, Jasmine, Jasper
- Jay – Jacob, James, Jamie, Jason, Jade, Jayde, Jane, Jayden
- Jer – Jeremy, Jeremiah, Jerome, Jerry
- Jess – Jessabelle, Jessalyn, Jessamyn, Jesse, Jessi, Jessica, Jessie
- Jo, Joey, Jojo – Joan, Joanna, Joanne, Joby, Joely, Johannes, Joseph, José, Josephine, Josephina, Josepha
- Josey, Josie – Joseph, Josephine, Josephina, Josepha
- Joss – Jocelyn, Joseph, Jose, Josiah
- Jools, Jules – Julia, Julian, Juliana, Julianne, Julie, Julius
- Kel – Kelly, Kelsey
- Ken – Kenneth, Kendall, Kennedy, Kendrick, Kendra, Mackenzie
- Kenzie – Mackenzie
- Kit – Christopher, Katherine, Kathleen
- Kris – Krista, Kristen, Kristian, Kristina, Kristin, Kristine, Kristoff, Kristopher
- Laurie, Lorrie – Laurence, Lawrence, Lawrencine, Loretta, Lorraine
- Len, Lenne, Lennie, Lenny – Lennox, Leonard, Leonardo
- Leo – Leon, Leona, Leonard, Leonora, Leopold
- Les – Leslie, Lesley, Lester
- Lex – Alexander, Alexandra, Alexis, Alexandria, Alexa, Alexius, Alexia, Lexington
- Lin, Lyn, Lynn – Linda, Lindsay, Lindy, Lyndon, Marilyn
- Lyss - Melissa
- Liv – Livia, Olive, Oliver, Olivia
- Loren – Lorenzo
- Lou, Louie – Lewis, Louis, Louisa, Louise, Lucas, Lucy, Lucilla, Lucille, Lucinda
- Louie – Louis, Louise
- Mac, Mack – Mackenzie, Mackey
- Maddi, Maddie, Maddy – Madeleine, Madeline, Madison, Maddox, Madox
- Mal – Malachi, Malcolm, Mallory
- Manda – Amanda, Miranda
- Mandi, Mandie, Mandy – Amanda, Amandus, Armand, Mandel
- Marl – Marlee, Marlene, Marley, Marlon
- Marti, Martie, Marty – Martin, Martina, Martha
- Matt, Matti, Mattie, Matty – Mathilda, Matilda, Matthew, Martha
- Max, Maxie – Maximilian, Maximus, Maxine, Maxwell
- Mel – Melanie, Melinda, Melissa, Melody, Melrose, Melvin, Melina
- Mic, Micki, Mickie, Mickey, Micky- Michael, Michaela, Michelle
- Mitchie – Michelle, Mitchel, Mitchell
- Mo, Moe – Maureen, Maurice, Mohamed, Morris
- Mont, Monti, Montie, Monty – Monta, Montae, Montague, Montana, Montgomery
- Nat, Natty – Nathanael, Natalia, Nathalie, Natasha, Nathan, Nathaniel, Natalie
- Nick, Nicki, Nicky, Nik, Nikki – Nicholas, Nicola, Nicole, Nicolette, Nikita, Nico
- Norrie – Nora, Norah, Norman, Norris
- Oli, Olie, Olli, Ollie, Olly – Olive, Oliver, Olivia
- Pat, Patsy, Patti, Pattie, Patty – Patricia, Patrick, Patrice
- Pay, Pey – Payton, Peyton
- Pip – Philip, Philippa, Pipkin, Pippa, Pippin
- Rae, Raine, Ray, Rey – Lorraine, Rachel, Ramona, Raymond, Reymond, Raven, Raphael, Racquel, Raquel
- Raf, Raffi, Raffy, Raph – Rafael, Raffaela, Raffaella, Raffaello, Raphael
- Randy – Andrew, Bertrand, Miranda, Randall, Randolf, Randolph, Veronica
- Reggie – Regina, Reginald
- Remy – Remington
- Ren, Rennie – Irene, Rene, Renée, Rennard, Serenity, Warren
- Rob, Robi, Robbie, Robby – Robert, Roberta, Roberto, Robin, Robyn
- Romi, Romy – Roman, Romeo, Rosemary, Rosemarie
- Ron, Roni, Ronni, Ronnie, Ronny – Ronald, Ronalda, Ronette, Veronica
- Roz – Rosa, Rosalie, Rosalind, Rosalyn, Roswell
- Ruby – Reuben, Ruben, Rubin, Rubina
- Russi, Russy – Russell
- Sacha, Sascha, Sasha – Alexander, Alexandra
- Sal – Sally, Salvador, Sarah
- Sam, Sammi, Sammie, Sammy – Samson, Samuel, Samantha, Samara, Samira, Samsara
- Sandi, Sandie, Sandy – Alexander, Alexandra, Lysander, Sandra, Cassandra
- Shelley, Shelli, Shellie, Shelly – Michelle, Sheldon, Shelton
- Shirl – Shirley
- Stace – Eustace, Stacey, Staci, Stacy
- Stef, Steff, Steph, Steve, Stevie – Stefan, Stephan, Stefanie, Stephanie, Stephen, Steven
- Sy – Simon, Seymour, Sylvester
- Tay – Tayshaun, Taylor
- Tee – Teagan, Teal, Teala, Teale, Teegan, Teela, Teelah, Teena
- Teddy – Edward, Thaddeus, Theodora, Theodore
- Terri, Terry – Terence, Teresa, Theresa
- Teo, Theo – Theobald, Theodora, Theodore, Theodoros
- Tibby – Tabitha, Theobald
- Tobey, Toby – Tobias
- Toni, Tonie, Tony – Anthony, Antonio, Antonia, Antoinette
- Tor, Tori, Torrey, Torry, Tory – Torrance, Torrence, Victor, Victoria
- Ty – Taryn, Tyler, Tyrone, Tyson
- Val – Valentina, Valentine, Valentino, Valerie
- Vern – Lavern, Laverne, Vernon
- Vic, Vickie, Vicki, Vicky – Victor, Victoria
- Viv, Vivi – Vivian, Viviana, Vivien, Vivienne
- Whit – Whitney, Whitfield, Whitman, Whittier
- Wil, Will – Wilkie, Wilhelm, Wilhelmina, William, Willa, Willow, Wilma
- Xan – Alexander, Alexandra, Alexandria, Xander, Xanthe
- Zan – Suzanna, Suzanne, Zander
- Zell – Zelda, Zella, Zelle, Zelly, Zelma

== Cross-cultural ==
Some names are masculine in one culture and feminine in another, so that when these cultures mix in a third location, the same name appears unisex. Examples include Andrea and Nicola, which is predominantly male in Italy, but predominantly female in other countries, or Joan, which is female in English, but male in Catalan.

== See also ==
- Epicene
- Unisex
- Gender equality
