= Dakota (given name) =

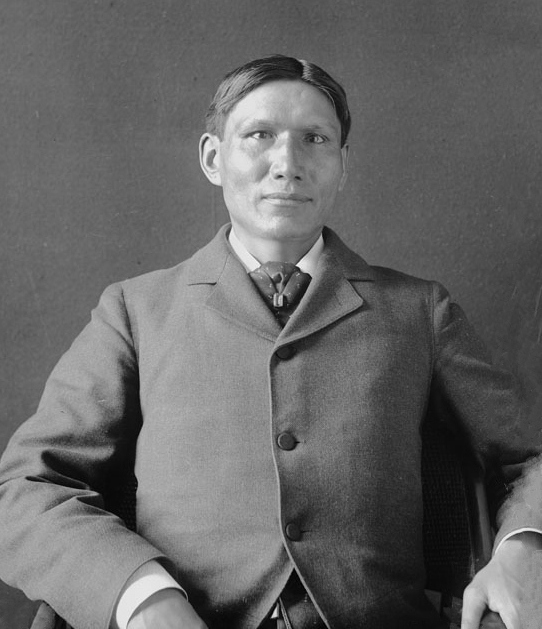
- Charles Eastman, a member of the Dakota tribe
- Gender: Unisex

Origin
- Origin: Dakota
- Meaning: "friend", "friendly" or "allies"

Other names
- Related names: Dakotah, Dacotah, Dakoda, Lakota, Nakota

Dakota is a unisex given name derived from the name of the Native American Dakota people. The name is translated to mean "friend", "friendly" or "allies" in the Yankton-Yanktonai and Santee dialects of the Dakota language.

== Popularity ==
The name has been in occasional use for both sexes in the United States since the 1850s and 1860s, according to census records. It was part of a 19th century fashion for using unusual place names. It is currently used in roughly equal numbers for both boys and girls in that country. The name's popularity grew in the 1990s in the United States. It was among the top 100 most popular boy names from 1993 to 2001, reaching its peak at number 56 in 1995. Since 2010, it has been slightly more frequently given to girls. As of 2021, it was the 270th most common girl name and the 344th most common boy name.

== People with the name ==
- Dakota Abberton, Australian surfer
- Dakota Allen (born 1995), American football player
- Dakota Cox (born 1994), American football player
- Dakota Darsow (born 1987), American professional wrestler
- Dakota Daulby (born 1994), Canadian actor
- Dakota Fanning (born 1994), American actress
- Dakota Goyo (born 1999), Canadian actor
- Dakota Johnson (born 1989), American model and actress
- Dakota Jordan (born 2003), American baseball player
- Dakota Kai (born 1988), New Zealander professional wrestler
- Dakota Lane (born 1959), American author
- Dakota Meyer, United States Marine and Medal of Honor recipient
- Dakota Morton (born 1988), Canadian radio host
- Dakota North (speedway rider) (born 1991), Australian speedway rider
- Dakota Rose (born 1995), Japan-based American model
- Dakota Blue Richards (born 1994), English actress
- Dakota Staton (1930–2007), American jazz singer
- Rayne Dakota (Dak) Prescott (born 1993), American football quarterback for the Dallas Cowboys
- Dakota Ditcheva (born 1998), British MMA fighter

=== Fictional ===
- Dakota North (character), a Marvel Comics character
- Dakota, a police officer in Lone Wolf McQuade, portrayed by L.Q. Jones
- Dakota, a contestant on Total Drama: Revenge of the Island
