= Arline =

Arline is a female given name. Notable people with the name include:

- Arline Fisch, American artist and educator who works with metal as her medium
- Arline Friscia (1934–2019), American politician who served in the New Jersey General Assembly
- Arline Burks Gant, director, actress, and costume designer
- Arline Hunter (1931–2018), American actress and model
- Arline Isaacson, American gay rights activist
- Arline Judge (1912–1974), American actress
- Arline Francis Kazanjian (1907–2001), American actress, radio talk show host, and game show panelist
- Mollie Arline Kirkland Bailey (1844–1918), circus musician, singer, war-time nurse, and, according to some accounts, a spy
- Arline Pretty (1885–1978), American actress

== See also ==
- Airline
- Aline (disambiguation)
- Arlie
- Carline
- SS Lake Arline, a commercial cargo ship acquired by the U.S. Navy during World War II
