= Berry (given name) =

- Gender: Unisex (primarily Masculine)
- Language: English

Origin
- Meaning: "berry"

Other names
- Related names: Berinthia, Beresford, Berenice, Barry

Berry is a given name and a nickname.

People named Berry include:

== Given name ==
- Berry Angriawan (born 1991), Indonesian badminton player
- Berry Bickle (born 1959), Zimbabwean artist
- Berry Fleming (1899–1989), American novelist
- Berry Gordy (born 1929), American record executive and producer, songwriter, film producer and television producer, founder of the Motown record label
- Berry Johnston (born 1935), American poker player, 1986 world champion
- Berry Kroeger (1912–1991), American film, television and stage actor
- Berry Mayall (1936–2021), British academic and sociologist
- Berry Oakley (1948–1972), American bassist, one of the founding members of the Allman Brothers Band
- Berry van Peer (born 1996), Dutch darts player
- Berry Powel (born 1980), Dutch footballer
- Berry Sakharof (born 1957), Israeli rock musician

== Nickname ==
- Berry Berenson (1948–2001), American photographer, actress and model
- Berry Berryman (1901–1972), LGBT researcher in early 1900s Utah
- Berry Brown (1927–2001), English football goalkeeper
- Berry Richards (1914–1982), Canadian politician

== Fictional characters ==
- Berry Shirayuki, in the anime Tokyo Mew Mew
- Berry, a rabbit in the American animated series Whisker Haven Tales with the Palace Pets
- Berry, a female pink character in Foster's Home for Imaginary Friends
- Berry, an epic brawler in the mobile game Brawl Stars.

== See also ==
- T. Berry Brazelton (1918–2018), American pediatrician, author, developer of the Neonatal Behavioral Assessment Scale, television host and syndicated columnist
