= Nakia (name) =

Nakia is an unisex given name of multiple origins and meanings. Arabic meaning: "pure". Not many baby naming sites point out other origins of the name. They also neglect to inform of any other pronunciation the name has.

Pronunciation (includes, but are not limited to): Nah-k-ee-ah (the commonly seen), Nay-k-ee-ah, Ni-k-ee-yah, Nuh-k-EYE-yuh/Nah-k-EYE-ah, Nek~ean, etc.

== People named Nakia ==
=== Males ===
- Nakia, American musician, singer-songwriter and actor, born Nakia Reynoso
- Nakia Codie, American football player
- Nakia Coleman, American rapper better known as Kia Shine
- Nakia Griffin-Stewart, American football player
- Nakia Jenkins, American former football player

=== Females ===
- Nakia Burrise, African American actress and director
- Nakia Sanford, American basketball center
- Nakia D. Johnson, American author

=== Fictional characters ===
- Nakia (comics), a Black Panther supporting character in Marvel Comics
- Deputy Nakia Parker, a police officer in the 1974 U.S. television series Nakia
- Queen Nakia, the villain in the Red River (manga)
