= Cyd =

Cyd is a given name, and may refer to:

- Cyd Adams (1949–2005), American poet and academic
- Cyd Charisse (1922–2008), American dancer and actress
- Cyd Gray (born 1973), Trinidad and Tobago footballer
- Cyd Hayman (born 1944), English actress
- Cyd Ho (born 1954), full-time legislative councillor of Hong Kong's Legislative Council
- Cyd Zeigler Jr (born 1973), American sportswriter

In fiction:

- Cyd Ripley, from the Disney Channel series Best Friends Whenever
- Cyd Sherman, more commonly referred to by her in-game alias "Codex", the central character of web series The Guild

== See also ==
- CYD
- CyD, FBI Cyber Division
