= Brooklyn (given name) =

- Gender: Unisex

Origin
- Origin: English
- Meaning: Combination of names Brooke and Lynn, or given in honor of Brooklyn, the New York City borough.
- Region of origin: United States

Brooklyn is a unisex first name. It has occasionally been used as a name in honor of Brooklyn, the New York City borough, but is usually regarded as simply a combination of the names Brook or Brooke, a name derived from an English surname meaning "one who lives near a brook" and the suffix -lyn, which is an element in other popular contemporary names in the United States.

== Popularity ==
It has been among the top one thousand names used for girls in the United States since 1992 and among the one hundred most popular names for American girls since 2005. It has also been among the top 500 names for girls in Canada between 2000 and 2019. It is also in use for boys in North America, but has been more popular as a name for boys in England and Wales, where it has been among the five hundred most popular names for boys since 1999. It was also among the top five hundred names for girls in England and Wales between 2013 and 2017. It was also among the top one hundred names for girls in New Zealand between 2000 and 2018 and for boys in New Zealand between 2004 and 2010. Spelling variants include, but are not limited to, Brookelynn, Brookelynne, Brooklyne, Brooklynne, and Brooklynn.

== People ==
- Brooklyn Beckham (born 1999), English model and amateur photographer
- Brooklyn Decker (born 1987), American model and actress
- Brooklyn Ezeh (born 2001), German association footballer
- Brooklyn Genesini (born 2001), English association footballer
- Brooklyn McKnight (born 1999), American YouTuber
- Brooklyn Moors (born 2001), Canadian artistic gymnast
- Brooklyn Nelson (born c. 2004), American actress
- Brooklyn Owen (born 2000), American LGBTQ activist
- Brooklyn Raines (born 2005), American association footballer
