= Aspen (name) =

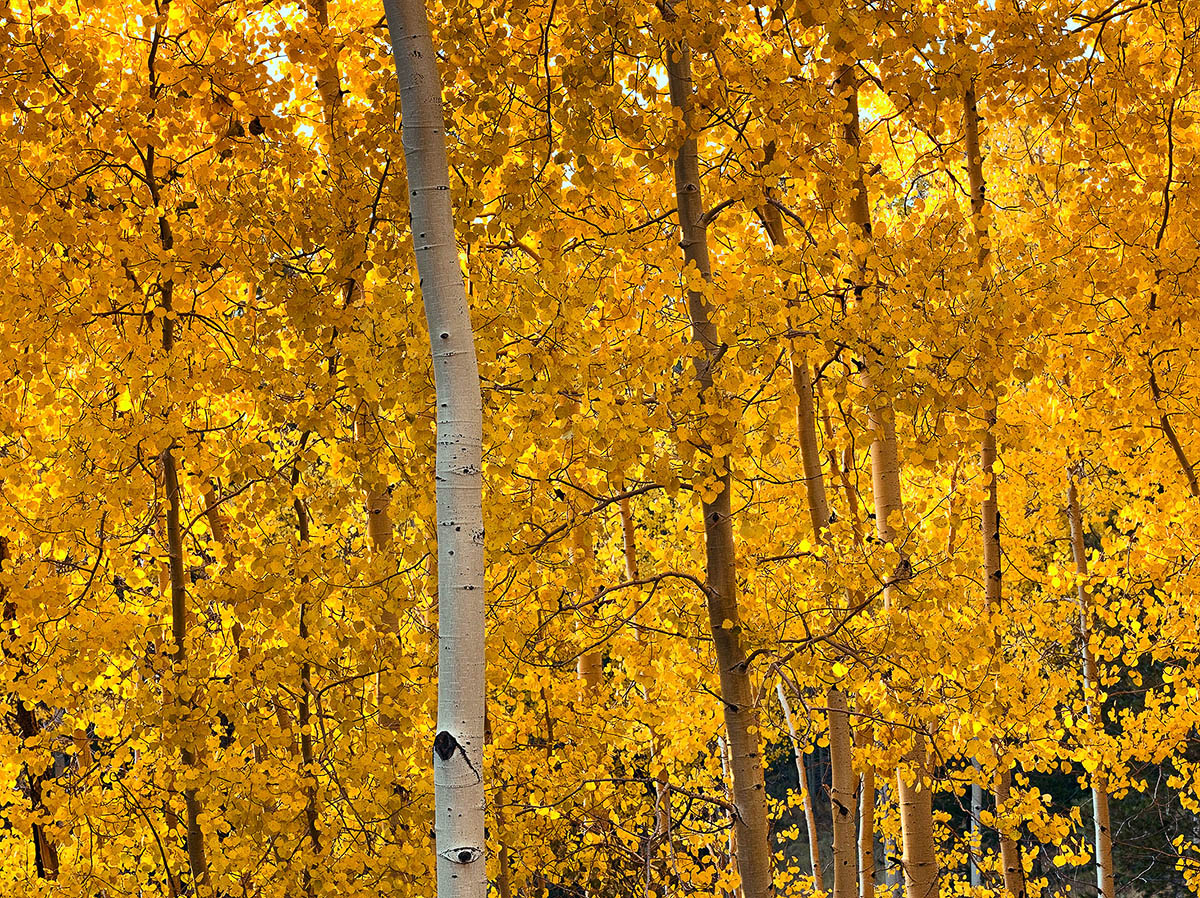
- Gender: Unisex (primarily female)
- Language: English

Origin
- Meaning: "Aspen tree"

Aspen is a given name and a surname. Notable people with the given name include:

== Given name ==
- Aspen Ladd (born 1995), American mixed martial artist
- Aspen Mays (born 1980), American artist
- Aspen Vincent (born 1975), American Broadway actress, voice actress, and pop singer

== Surname ==
- Al Aspen (1893–1959), American racing driver
- Bert Aspen (born 1934), British former wrestler
- Brian Aspen (born 1959), British retired wrestler
- Dean Aspen, English actor
- Jennifer Aspen (born 1973), American actress
- Lorentz Aspen (born 1978), Norwegian heavy metal pianist and keyboardist
- Marvin Aspen (born 1934), American judge
