= Dayle =

Dayle is a unisex given name. Notable people with the given name include:

- Dayle Bonner, Australian professional rugby league footballer
- Dayle Coleing (born 1996), Gibraltarian professional footballer
- Dayle Dolkens (born 2001), Australian field hockey player
- Dayle Douglas (1882–1945), Scottish screenwriter
- Dayle Friedman, American rabbi
- Dayle Grubb (born 1991), English professional footballer
- Dayle Haddon (1948–2024), Canadian model and actress
- Dayle Hadlee (born 1948), former New Zealand cricketer
- Dayle Hammock (1947–2024), South Dakota politician
- Dayle Hinman (born 1952), retired FBI-trained criminal profiler
- Dayle Ross (born 2003), Canadian ice hockey player
- Dayle Shackel (born 1970), New Zealand former cricketer
- Dayle Southwell (born 1993), English professional footballer

== See also ==
- Dale (disambiguation)
