= Saša =

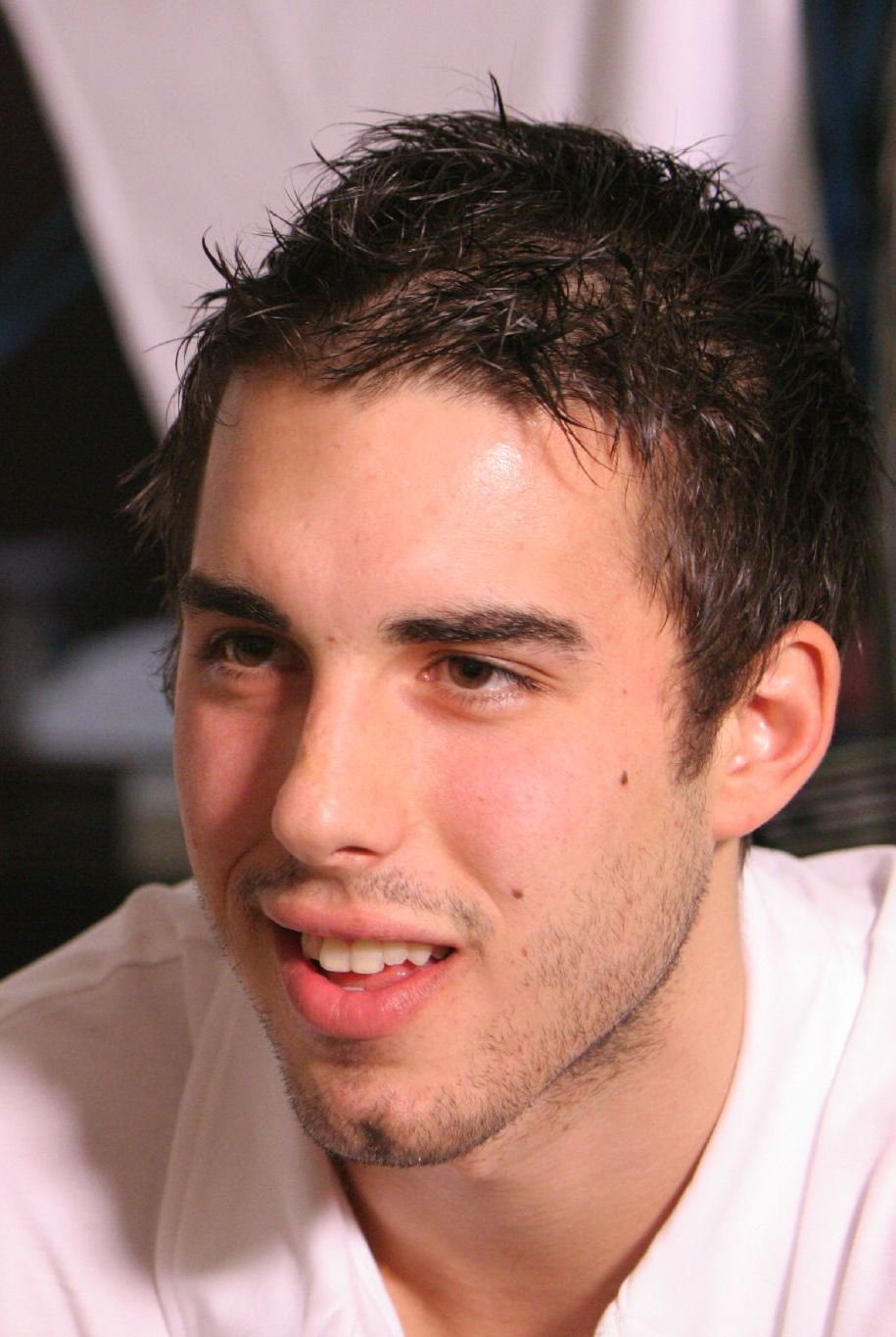
Aleksandar Saša Vujačić

Saša is a South Slavic given name. It is a diminutive of Aleksandar (see Sasha), but in the South Slavic countries it is often a formal name as well. It may refer to:

- Saša Antunović (born 1974), Serbian footballer
- Saša Bjelanović (born 1979), Croatian footballer
- Saša Bogunović (born 1982), Serbian footballer
- Saša Čađo (born 1989), Serbian basketball player
- Saša Cilinšek (born 1982), Serbian footballer
- Saša Ćirić (born 1968), Macedonian footballer
- Saša Ćurčić (born 1972), Serbian footballer
- Saša Đorđević (footballer) (1981–2025), Serbian footballer
- Saša Dragin (born 1972), Serbian politician
- Saša Drakulić (born 1972), Serbian footballer
- Saša Gajser (born 1974), Slovenian footballer
- Saša Gedeon (born 1970), Czech film director
- Saša Hiršzon (born 1972), Yugoslavian/Croatian tennis player
- Saša Ilić (footballer born 1972), Serbian-Australian football goalkeeper
- Saša Ilić (footballer born 1977), Serbian footballer
- Saša Ilić (Macedonian footballer) (born 1970), Macedonian footballer
- Saša Imprić (born 1986), Croatian swimmer
- Saša Ivanović (born 1984), Montenegrin footballer
- Saša Ivetić (born 1982), Canadian cyclist, fisherman, and architect
- Saša Kajkut (born 1984), Bosnian footballer
- Saša Kocić (born 1976), Serbian footballer
- Saša Kovačević (footballer) (born 1973), Serbian footballer
- Saša Lošić (born 1964), Bosnian musician
- Saša Lozar (born 1980), Croatian musician
- Saša Lukić (born 1996), Serbian footballer
- Saša Martinović (disambiguation), multiple people
- Saša Matić (born 1978), Serbian musician
- Saša Nedeljković (born 1967), Serbian footballer
- Saša Obradović (born 1969), Serbian basketball coach and former player
- Saša Papac (born 1980), Bosnian footballer
- Saša Peršon (born 1965), Croatian footballer
- Saša Petricic (born 1963), Canadian journalist
- Saša Radivojević (born 1979), Serbian footballer
- Saša Ranić (born 1981), Slovenian footballer
- Saša Simonović (born 1975), Serbian footballer
- Saša Skenderija (born 1968), Bosnian-American poet
- Saša Stamenković (born 1985), Serbian footballer
- Saša Stanišić (born 1978), Bosnian-German writer
- Saša Todić (born 1974), Serbian footballer
- Saša Toperić (born 1972), Bosnian musician and diplomat
- Saša Vasiljević (born 1979), Bosnian basketball player
- Saša Viciknez (born 1974), Serbian footballer
- Saša Vlaisavljević (born 1968), Serbian businessman
