= Alemayehu =

Alemayehu or ˁAlämayyähu (Ge'ez: ዓለማየሁ) is a personal name of Ethiopian origin which is composed of two words: "Alem"- meaning "the world or life" and "ayehu" - means "I have seen". Its literal meaning is "I have seen the world" . However, in the context of personal name, its actual meaning is "I have enjoyed life" in the Amharic language. It is also a surname. The prominent Ethiopians with the name Alemayehu are:

== Given name ==
- Prince Alemayehu (1861–1879), Ethiopian prince and son of Tewodros II
- Alemayehu Bezabeh (born c. 1986), Ethiopian long-distance runner who competes for Spain
- Alemayehu Eshete (born 1941), Ethio-jazz musician
- Alemayehu Roba (born 1972), retired Ethiopian middle-distance runner
- Alemayehu Shumye (born 1988), Ethiopian marathon runner
- Alemayehu Tegenu, Minister of Mines and Energy of Ethiopia

== Surname ==
- Haddis Alemayehu (1910–2003), Ethiopian Foreign Minister and novelist
- Louis Alemayehu (born 1945), American poet
- Simretu Alemayehu (born 1970), Ethiopian retired long-distance runner and winner of the Turin Marathon
