= Dannie =

Dannie is a given name. Notable people with the name include:

- Dannie Abse (1923–2014), Welsh poet
- Dannie Bulman (born 1979), English football midfielder
- Dannie Heineman (1872–1962), Belgian-American engineer and businessman
- Dannie Lockett (born 1964), American football player
- Dannie Richmond (1935–1988), American drummer, worked with Charles Mingus, Joe Cocker, Elton John and Mark-Almond
- Dannie Seow (born 1967), Australian Rules Footballer

== See also ==
- Dannie Heineman Prize for Astrophysics
- Dannie Heineman Prize for Mathematical Physics
