= Syd (name) =

Syd is a diminutive form (and hypocorism) of Sydney or a nickname.

- Syd, American singer-songwriter
- Syd Barrett, British musician and co-founder of the rock band Pink Floyd
- David "Syd" Lawrence, former English cricketer
- Syd Levy (1922–2015), South African tennis player
- Syd Little, English comedian and straight man to Eddie Large in the double act Little and Large
- Syd Straw, American folk singer
- Syd'quan Thompson, American football cornerback
