= Xanthe =

- Pronunciation: ZAN-thee
- Gender: Female
- Language: English

Origin
- Origin: Greek

Other names
- Variant forms: Xantippe, Xan

Xanthe (/ˈzænθiː/; Greek: Ξανθή, meaning "blond-haired") is a name with origins in Greek mythology. People with this first name include:

- Xanthe Adams (born 1968), Australian former tennis player
- Xanthe Elbrick (born 1978), British actress
- Xanthe Huynh, American actress
- Xanthé Mallett (born 1976), British anthropologist and criminologist
- Xanthe Ryder (1926–1998), British alpine skier
- Xanthe Scharff, American writer and social entrepreneur

In Greek mythology:

- One of the Oceanids (sea nymphs), daughters of Oceanus and Tethys
- One of the Amazons
- Epione, the wife of Asclepius, is sometimes called Xanthe

It may also refer to:

- 411 Xanthe, main belt asteroid
- Xanthe Canning, a fictional character from the Australian soap opera Neighbours
- Xanthe Montes, mountain range on the planet Mars
- Xanthe Terra, a region on Mars

== See also ==
- Xanthi
