= Vieno =

Vieno is both a surname and a given name. Notable people with the name include:

- Jukka Vieno (born 1957), Finnish writer
- V. J. Sukselainen (1906–1995), Finnish politician and Prime Minister of Finland
- Vieno Simonen (1898–1994), Finnish politician and farmer
- Vieno Länsman (died 2024), Finnish politician
