= Louis Alemayehu =

American poet

Louis Alemayeh
- Born: December 31, 1945 (age 80); Chicago
- Occupation: Poet Educator Musician Community Organizer

Louis Alemayehu is an American poet, educator, musician, and community organizer.

== Biography ==
Alemayehu was born December 31, 1945, in Chicago, Illinois to parents of African, American Indian, and European descent.

Alemayehu taught Environmental Sustainability at the Higher Education Consortium for Urban Affairs in Minneapolis Minnesota. He has also been a community organizer with Environmental Justice Advocates of Minnesota (EJAM). As a writer, Alemayehu has used his poetry and storytelling to unite communities over environmental concerns. Alemayehu is a founding member of the award-winning poetry/jazz ensemble Ancestor Energy and a co-founder with Juanita Espinoza of the Native Arts Circle. Alemayehu participated in Occupy Minnesota events in 2011. He serves on the Minneapolis Energy Partnership Board. He is a Buddhist and is the father of two daughters, Hanika Mahalia Alemayehu and Eden Luzia Alemayehu.
