= Valya =

Valya is a given name. Notable holders include:

- Valya (singer) (born 1978), Bulgarian pop folk singer
- Valya Balkanska (born 1942), Bulgarian folk music singer
- Valya Dudycz Lupescu (born 1974), Ukrainian American writer
- Valya Samvelyan (1937–1990), Armenian female folk singer

== See also ==
- Valya algebra
