= Apple (name) =

List of people with the same nickname

Apple is a given name, nickname, and surname. People and fictional characters with the name include:

== People with the given name ==
- Apple Brook (1931–2023), British actress
- Apple Hong (born 1978), Malaysian actress and singer
- Apple Martin (born 2004), the daughter of Chris Martin and Gwyneth Paltrow
- Apple Pope (fl. 2006–present), American rugby league player

== Fictional characters with the given name ==
- Apple Bloom, a younger sister of Applejack in My Little Pony: Friendship is Magic
- Applejack, a main character in My Little Pony and My Little Pony: Equestria Girls
- Apple White, a character from Ever After High
- Apple Wilson, a character in the Canadian animated series Mother Up!
- Apple, a character in the Suikoden videogame series.
- Apple, a main character in the TV series Apple & Onion
- Apple, a peppy hamster in the Animal Crossing videogame series.

== People with the nickname ==
- A. T. Sanders Jr. (1926–1989), American politician
- Constance Applebee (1873–1981), known as "the Apple", best known for introducing field hockey to the United States
- Ken Green (basketball, born 1959), American athlete

== People with the surname ==
- Adam Apple (1831–1905), American politician and farmer
- Andrew O. Apple (1845–1890), American Civil War soldier and Medal of Honor recipient
- Billy Apple (1935–2021), New Zealand artist
- Chris Apple (born 1970), American professional soccer player and coach
- David J. Apple (1941–2011), American ophthalmologist, pathologist, biographer and medical historian
- Eli Apple (born 1995), American National Football League player
- Erik Apple (born 1977), American professional mixed martial arts fighter
- Fiona Apple (born 1977), Grammy award-winning American singer-songwriter
- Heather Elizabeth Apple (born 1948), Canadian writer, artist, and educator
- Jupiter Apple (1968–2015), Brazilian singer-songwriter and musician
- Max Apple (born 1941), American author and academic
- Michael Apple (born 1942), American critical educational theorist
- Pat Apple (born 1957), American politician
- R. W. Apple Jr. (1934–2006), associate editor at The New York Times
- Raymond Apple (rabbi) (1935–2024), former Senior Rabbi of the Great Synagogue of Sydney, Australia

== See also ==
- Apfel, a surname
- Appel (disambiguation)
- Appell, a surname
- Apple (disambiguation)
- Candy Apples (born 1976), American pornographic actress
