= Avie =

- Pronunciation: /ˈeɪvi/ AY-vee /ˈævi/ A-vee
- Gender: Unisex
- Language: English

Origin
- Origin: Modern English
- Meaning: "Voice"

Other names
- See also: Ava

Avie is a female or male given name. As a nickname, it can be short for Avis, Avery, Avanel, Ava, and Avalina.

Notable people with the name include:

- Avie Acosta (born 1996/1997), American fashion model
- Avie Bennett, a Canadian businessman
- Avie Luthra, a Indian playwright and screenwriter
- Avie Tevanian, ex–Chief Software Technology Officer at Apple Computer
