= Viv (given name) =

Viv is a unisex given name, often a short form (hypocorism) of Vivian or Vivienne or variations thereof. It may refer to:

== People ==
=== Women ===
- Viv Albertine (born 1954), British singer and songwriter
- Viv Nicholson (1936–2015), British woman who went on spending sprees when her second husband won the football pools
- Viv Stephens (born 1953), New Zealand cricketer

=== Men ===
- Viv Allen (1916–1995), Canadian hockey player
- Viv Anderson (born 1956), English football coach and player
- Viv Bingham (1932–2012), British political activist and president of the Liberal Party
- Viv Busby (born 1949), British football player and manager
- Viv Dunn (1895–1974), Australian rugby union player
- Viv Farnsworth (1889–1953), Australian rugby league player
- Vivian Gibbins (1901–1979), English amateur footballer
- Viv Harrison (1921–1989), Welsh rugby union and rugby league player
- Viv Huzzey (1876–1929), Welsh rugby union and baseball player
- Vivian Jenkins (1911–2004), Welsh rugby union player and sports journalist
- Viv Michie (born 1992), Australian rules footballer
- Viv Parkinson (1882–1944), Australian rules footballer
- Viv Peterson (born 1942), Australian rules footballer
- Viv Prince (1941-2025), English drummer
- Viv Randall (1914–1985), Australian rules footballer
- Viv Richards (born 1952), West Indian cricketer
- Viv Solomon-Otabor (born 1996), English footballer
- Viv Thicknesse (1910–1986), Australian rugby league and rugby union player
- Viv Thomas (born 1948), British pornographer
- Viv Valentine (1887–1967), Australian rules footballer
- Viv Woodward (Welsh footballer), Welsh footballer

== Female fictional characters ==
- Viv Hope, on the British soap opera Emmerdale
- Vivian Johnson (Without a Trace), on the American crime drama series Without a Trace
- Viv Newton, on the Australian soap opera Home and Away
- Viv Vision, a Marvel Comics android
- Viv, a character on the British children's TV programme The Dumping Ground - see List of The Dumping Ground characters#Viv
