= Gertie =

Gertie may refer to:

== People ==
- Gertie Brown (1878–1934), vaudeville performer and one of the first African-American film actresses
- Gertie Eggink (born 1980), Dutch sidecarcross rider
- Gertie Evenhuis (1927–2005), Dutch writer of children's literature
- Gertie Fröhlich (1930–2020), Austrian painter and graphic designer
- Gertie F. Marx (1912–2004), German-born American physician and obstetric anesthesiologist
- Gertie Gitana (1887–1957), English singer
- Gertie Millar, Countess of Dudley, (1879–1952), English actress and singer
- Gertie Wandel (1894–1988), Danish textile artist

== Arts and entertainment ==
=== Fictional characters ===
- Gertie (Hey Arnold!), in the television series Hey Arnold!
- Gertie, in the film E.T. the Extra-Terrestrial
- Gertie Gator, one of the toys in the PBS Kids series Noddy.
- Gertie Growlerstien, a fictional monster from the Disney Junior TV series Henry Hugglemonster
- Gravel Gertie (character), in the comic strip Dick Tracy
- The title character of Gertie the Dinosaur, a 1914 film
- Gertie Cummins, secondary character in the Rodgers and Hammerstein Broadway musical Oklahoma!

=== Sculptures ===
- Gertie the Duck, a 1997 sculpture of a mallard that roosted under a bridge in Milwaukee

== Other uses ==
- Gewürztraminer, or "gertie", a type of wine grape
- Galloping Gertie, a suspension bridge
- Gravel Gertie, a room designed for safe inspection, handling or dismantling of nuclear weapons
- Gruesome Gertie, an electric chair

== See also ==
- Gerty (disambiguation)
