= Deanne =

Deanne /diːˈæn/ dee-AN, sometimes styled "DeAnne", is a feminine given name. Notable people with the name include:

- Deanne Bell (born c. 1980), American reality television show host
- Deanne Bergsma (born 1941), retired South African ballerina
- Deanne Bray (born 1971), American deaf actress
- DeAnne Julius (born 1949), American-British economist
- Deanne Lundin, American poet and short story writer
- Deanna Wiener (born 1953), American politician
- Stacy-Deanne (born 1978), American author
- Deanne Rose (born 1999), Canadian professional soccer player
- Deanne Criswell, American emergency management officer
- Deanne Soza (born 2001), American artistic gymnast

== See also ==
- Deane (disambiguation)
- Deanna
