= Russi (disambiguation) =

Russi is a commune in the Province of Ravenna in the Italian region, Emilia-Romagna.

Russi may also refer to:

- U.S. Russi, an Italian association football club located in Russi
- Bernhard Russi (born 1948), former World Cup alpine ski racer from Switzerland
- Franco dei Russi (fl. 15th century) Italian painter, active in field of manuscript illumination
- Russi Karanjia (1912–2008), Indian journalist, editor, and founder of the tabloids, the Blitz and the Daily
- Russi Mody (1918–2014), Indian businessman
- Russi Taylor (1944–2019), American voice actress

== See also ==
- Rossi (disambiguation)
- Russia (disambiguation)
- Russo (disambiguation)
