= Lenne (disambiguation) =

The Lenne is a tributary of the river Ruhr in North Rhine-Westphalia, Germany.

Lenne may also refer to:

== Places in Germany ==
- Lenne (Weser), a tributary of the Weser in Lower Saxony
- Lenne (Schmallenberg), a locality in Schmallenberg, North Rhine-Westphalia
- Lenne, Lower Saxony, a municipality in the district of Holzminden, Lower Saxony
- Lenne Mountains, a range of hills in North Rhine-Westphalia

== People ==
=== Given name ===
- Lenne Hardt, American voice actress and ring announcer for Japanese MMA organizations

=== Surname ===
- Bert Lenne (1889–1973), Australian footballer
- George Lenne (1916–2014), Australian rules footballer
- Marion Lenne, French politician
- Peter Joseph Lenné (1789-1866), German landscape architect
- Yanis Lenne (born 1996), French handball player

== Other ==
- Lenne (Final Fantasy X-2), a character in the video game Final Fantasy X-2, voiced by Cree Summer
