= Cleon (disambiguation) =

Cleon was an Athenian statesman.

Cleon may also refer to:

== Single name ==
- Cleon (general) (died 132 BC), general in First Servile War
- Cleon (sculptor), ancient Greek sculptor from Sicyon
- Cleon of Sicyon, a tyrant of the ancient Greek city of Sicyon
- Cleon of Gordiucome, king in Asia Minor

Fictional characters

- Cleon (Foundation), multiple fictional characters from the 2021 TV series Foundation
- Cleon I and Cleon II, fictional emperors in Isaac Asimov's Foundation series of novels
- Cleon, a character in The Warriors
- Cleon of Astopor, or Cleon the Great, a fictional king in George R. R. Martin's fantasy series, A Song of Ice and Fire
- Cleon, pen name used by American illustrator Cleo Damianakes in 1920s book dust jacket designs

== Places ==
- Cléon, a commune in France
- Cléon-d'Andran, a commune in France
- Cleon Township, Michigan

== Other uses ==
- Renault Cléon engine
- Cléon derailment, a 2026 railway accident in France

== Given name ==
- Cleon Daskalakis (born 1962), American hockey player
- Cleon H. Foust (1907–2003), American politician from Indiana
- Cleon Jones (born 1942), American baseball player
- Cleon Lacefield, American manager for NASA and Lockheed Martin
- W. Cleon Skousen (1913–2006), American conservative author and academic
- Cleon Turner (born 1945), American politician and Massachusetts state legislator
