= Tomomi =

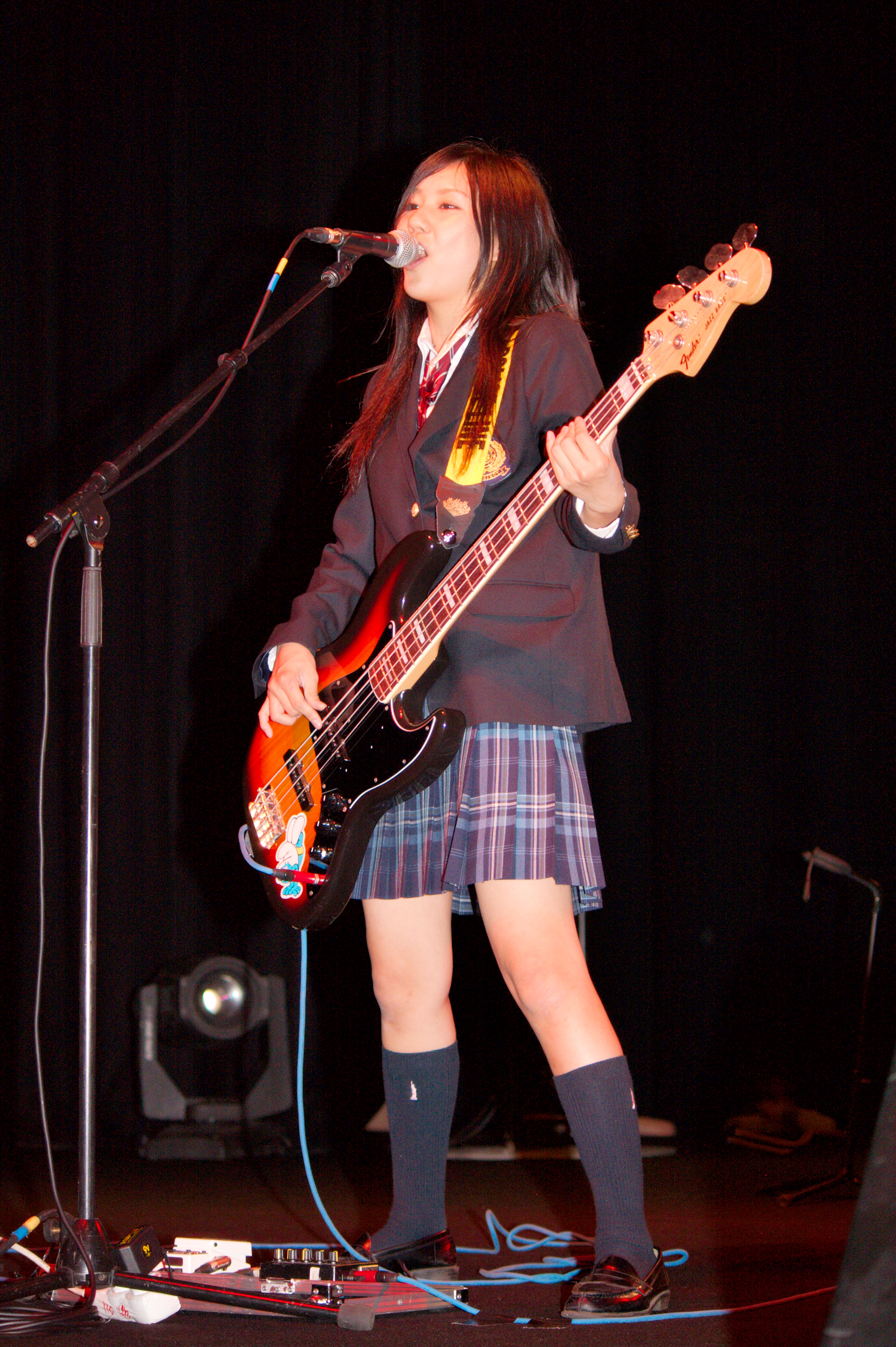
- Tomomi Ogawa, Japanese bassist and secondary vocalist of SCANDAL
- Pronunciation: To-mo-mi
- Gender: Unisex

Origin
- Origin: Japanese
- Meaning: Different meanings depending on the kanji used
- Region of origin: Japan

Tomomi (ともみ, トモミ) is a Japanese given name which can be given to either gender.

== Written forms ==
Forms in kanji can include:

- 智美, "wisdom, intellect, reason, beauty"
- 知美, "knowledge, beauty"
- 朋美, "companion, friend, beauty"
- 友美, "friend, beauty"
- 智実, "wisdom, fruit"
- 智実, "wisdom, intellect, reason, truth"
- 知実, "knowledge, truth"
- 供実, "offer, truth"
- 共美, "together, beauty"
- トモミ, katakana characters for Tomomi
- ともみ, hiragana characters for Tomomi

== People with the name ==
- Tomomi Abiko (我孫子 智美; born 1988), Japanese pole vaulter
- Tomomi Adachi (足立 智美; born 1972), Japanese musician and composer
- Tomomi Aoki (青木 智美; born 1994), Japanese swimmer
- Tomomi Hayashi (林 知充; born 1971), Japanese-Estonian architect
- Tomomi Hosoda (細田 朋美; born 1971), Japanese swimmer
- Tomomi Inada (稲田 朋美; born 1959), Japanese politician
- Tomomi Ishiura (born 1988), Japanese para swimmer
- Tomomi Itano (板野 友美; born 1991), Japanese singer and idol
- Tomomi Iwahara (岩原 知美; born 1987), Japanese ice hockey player
- Tomomi Iwakura (岩倉 具視; 1825–1883), Japanese politician
- Tomomi Kahara (華原 朋美; born 1974), Japanese pop singer
- Tomomi Kai (甲斐 智美; born 1983), Japanese shogi player
- Tomomi Kasai (河西 智美; born 1991), Japanese singer and idol
- Tomomi Komori (友美 小森; born 1983), Japanese field hockey player
- Tomomi Manako (眞子 智実; born 1972), Japanese motorcycle racer
- Tomomi Mineuchi (嶺内 ともみ; born 1997), Japanese voice actress
- Tomomi Miyashita (宮下 ともみ; born 1982), Japanese actress
- Tomomi Mochizuki (望月 智充; born 1958), Japanese anime director and producer
- Tomomi Morita (森田 智己; born 1984), Japanese swimmer
- Tomomi Muramatsu (村松 友視; born 1940), Japanese novelist
- Tomomi Nishimoto (西本 智実; born 1970), Japanese conductor
- Tomomi Nakao (中尾 巴美; born 1981), Japanese volleyball player
- Tomomi Ogawa (小川 ともみ, born 1990), Japanese bassist
- Tomomi Okazaki (岡崎 朋美; born 1971), Japanese speed skater
- Tomomi Jiena Sumi (鷲見 友美ジェナ, born 1994), Japanese singer
- Tomomi Takahashi (baseball) (高橋 朋己; born 1988), Japanese baseball player
- Tomomi Takahashi (pole vaulter) (高橋 卓巳; born 1956), Japanese pole vaulter
- Tomomi Takano (高野 人母美; born 1987), Japanese model and boxer
- Tomomi Tozawa (兎澤 朋美) (born 1999), Japanese para athlete
- Tomomi Tsuruta (鶴田 友美; 1951–2000), Japanese professional wrestler
- Tomomi Yamaguchi (山口 智美; born 1967), Japanese anthropologist
- Tomomi Yamaki (八巻 智美; born 1971), Japanese Paralympic athlete

== Fictional characters ==
- Tomomi Matsunaga, a character in the manga series Miracle Girls
