= Cass (given name) =

Cass is the given name of:

People:

- Cass Ballenger (1926–2015), U.S. Representative, 1986–2005
- Cass Browne (born 1971), English rock drummer
- Cass Canfield (1897–1986), American publishing executive
- Cass Daley (1915–1975), American actress, singer and comedian
- Cass Elliot (1941–1974), American singer with the Mamas & the Papas, born Ellen Naomi Cohen
- Cass Fox (born 1982), English singer who originally performed as "Cass"
- Cass Gilbert (1859–1934), American architect
- Cass McCombs (born 1977), American singer, songwriter and musician
- Cass Michaels (1926–1982), American Major League Baseball player
- Cass Pennant (born 1958), English writer and former football hooligan
- Cass Phang (born 1969), retired Cantopop singer from Hong Kong
- Cassandra Ponti (born 1980), Filipino actress and contestant in Pinoy Big Brother
- Cass Sunstein (born 1954), American legal scholar and professor

Fictional characters:

- the title character of the Sinclair Lewis novel and film Cass Timberlane
- Cass Winthrop, a character in the American television soap opera Another World
- Castiel (Supernatural), a character in the American television series Supernatural
