= Brooklyn Owen =

American LGBTQ activist (born 2000)

Brooklyn Owen (formerly Seth Owen (25–26 years old)) is an American LGBTQ activist and student from Jacksonville, Florida. She came to national attention in 2018 when the story of her being ostracized by her Southern Baptist parents for being gay compelled a GoFundMe campaign for her education to go viral. The fund was intended to just cover her tuition at Georgetown University. When it surpassed the goal, she used the surplus to create a scholarship fund organization to help other LGBTQ youth in “volatile home situations”. As of 2019, she is the youth ambassador for the Human Rights Campaign, an intern with Representative Stephanie Murphy (D-FL), and president at Unbroken Horizons Scholarship Foundation, Inc. In 2021, Owen announced that she was running for the Florida Senate, for the seat held by Audrey Gibson, who is term-limited.

== Early life/education ==
Brooklyn Owen's family is deeply religious, and are devout members of Pecan Park Baptist Church, on the north side of Jacksonville, Florida. Her whole family is involved in the church, with her dad being the church deacon, and her mom the church treasurer. She describes her childhood hometown as a "very conservative, very ultra-religious, restrictive Southern Baptist community." Her family would "disparage queer folks" going back to her earliest memories; her father would yell "faggot" at the television.

In high school she was captain of the swim team and "an academic all-star". When she was a sophomore her father, while spending hours going through Brooklyn's phone, found a photo of her kissing her first boyfriend, and her parents "questioned [her] all night" because she still presented as male and they thought she was gay. Her parents then sent her for a controversial practice, conversion therapy with a Christian counselor, with the intention of making Brooklyn heterosexual. She later said the most toxic aspect of the ordeal was that she "desperately wanted it to work, just so I could survive life at home".

During her high school junior year she avoided home by working three jobs and many extracurricular activities, as a way to deal with the tension from her parents. Brooklyn stated, as an "ambitious 17-year-old high school junior, I was working three jobs. I registered for dual enrollment college courses, every honor society, and every extracurricular school activity I could fit in my schedule." She did so to avoid dealing with her family, she felt their church was teaching them "painful, racist, and anti-LGBTQ+ hate." One night she "burst into tears because I realized that I had to go back home and put on a mask." She also was experiencing symptoms of depression and suicidal ideation. Her time at home came to an end during her senior year when her parents started attending "a church with an anti-LGBTQ pastor". In addition to very negative comments about LGBTQ people, they spoke about transgender people as being inhuman, which really bothered her. Her father said "He's allowed to live here as long as he worships the same way we worship." When Brooklyn said she did not want to go, her father, a firm believer in filial obedience, responded, "Biblically, we have the right to stone you for what you're saying," Brooklyn left that night and stayed with friends. She had $25 in her bank account; her parents "vowed not to spend a penny on [her] college education". She graduated as co-valedictorian with a 4.16 grade point average and was accepted by Georgetown University, where she planned to major in government and African-American studies.

=== College financing events ===
Brooklyn's financial aid for Georgetown, covering the four year's cost of $77,000, was based on her parents' support, but despite appeals it wasn't changed. Her biology teacher created a GoFundMe page to raise $20,000 for her first year's tuition; after the story went viral it reached $141,000. She made an appearance on The Ellen DeGeneres Show, where Ellen presented a gift donation of $25,000. Brooklyn's appearance was nominated for a GLAAD Media Award for Outstanding Variety or Talk Show Episode. In September 2018, at the annual Human Rights Campaign dinner, former Vice President and 2020 presidential candidate Joe Biden delivered a speech about Brooklyn, who was in the audience. Georgetown relented after the publicity and adjusted her financial aid. They helped her with a scholarship, allowing her to study at the Walsh School of Foreign Service. As of March 2019 she characterizes her relationship with her birth family as very toxic.

=== Unbroken Horizons ===
She used the extra funds to create Unbroken Horizons Scholarship Foundation, Inc., to help other LGBTQ students with their education. Brooklyn said, "Many homeless youth are LGBTQ+ identifying, and the majority of them are homeless because of family rejection," so she's targeting the scholarships to LGBTQ youth of color for any post-secondary education. She decided to focus on people of color on the advice from a mentor who pointed out her white privilege likely contributed to the success of the initial GoFundMe appeal. Brooklyn, and Unbroken's senior Vice President of communication and marketing Kaylee Petik, were given the Voice for Equality Award at the Equality Florida Greater Jacksonville Gala. Another GoFundMe campaign was started to kickstart the endowment to fund scholarships.

=== Later developments ===
Representative Stephanie Murphy (D-FL) heard her story and offered Brooklyn an internship, and included her on the Floor of the U.S. House of Representatives to witness the voting for the Equality Act, to establish nationwide civil rights protections for LGBTQ+ people. It is the first time that a Congress chamber passed comprehensive non-discrimination protections for LGBTQ+ people.

In June 2019, to mark the 50th anniversary of the Stonewall riots, sparking the start of the modern LGBTQ rights movement, Queerty named her one of the Pride50 "trailblazing individuals who actively ensure society remains moving towards equality, acceptance and dignity for all queer people". In June 2019 she was also a speaker at Fernandina Pride Parade and Festival in Fernandina Beach, Florida. For National Coming Out Day (October 11), her op-ed about her coming out after surviving conversion therapy—where she shared "the worst feeling is hiding who you really are"—was published in Out.

In February 2021, Owen filed to run for Florida's 6th Senate district as a Democrat. The seat is currently held by Audrey Gibson, who is prevented for running for re-election due to term limits.
