= Dasha =

Dasha may be:

- Dasha (astrology), a planetary period in Indian astrology
- Dasha, Kaiping (大沙镇), town in Kaiping, China
- Dasha, Duchang County (大沙镇), town in Duchang County, Jiangxi, China
- Dasha River (Guangdong) in Guangdong, China

== Sanskrit for "ten" ==
- Dashavatara, the ten avatars of the Hindu god Vishnu
- Dasha Shloki, a ten versed hymn by Adi Shankara

== People ==
=== Given name ===
- A Slavic diminutive for Daria
- Dasha (singer) (born 2000), an American singer known for the 2023 song "Austin"
- Dasha from Sevastopol (1836–1892), a Russian nurse during the Crimean War
- Dasha Akayev (1910–1944), at Chechen pilot and commander in the Soviet Air Forces
- Dasha Astafieva (born 1985), Ukrainian model and singer
- Daria Atamanov (born 2005), Israeli rhythmic gymnast
- Dasha Burns (born 1992), an American journalist
- Dasha Gonzalez (born 1988), an American fitness model and professional wrestler
- Dasha Ivanova (born 1996), a Russian-born American tennis player
- Dasha Kasatkina (born 1997), a Russian-born Australian tennis player
- Dasha Kovalova (born 1994), a Ukrainian-American bowler
- Dasha Krivoshlyapova (1950–2003), a conjoined twin (along with her sister, Masha) from Russia
- Dasha Logan (born 1987), a Malaysian singer-songwriter
- Dasha Medova (born 1990 – missing since 2018), a Ukrainian entertainer and model
- Dasha Nekrasova (born 1991), Belarusian actress, writer, podcaster and model, also known as "Sailor Socialism"
- Dasha Saville (born 1994), an Australian tennis player
- Dasha Shashina, a former member of the Russian girl group Serebro
- Dasha Shishkin (born 1977), an American artist
- Dasha Zhukova (born 1981), Russian philanthropist, entrepreneur, model, fashion designer and magazine editor

=== Fictional characters ===
- Dasha Plank, Zenon's adoptive cousin in Zenon: Z3, played by Alyson Morgan
- Dasha, a character who is Masha's cousin in Masha and the Bear
- Dasha, a character in River Secrets and Forest Born by Shannon Hale

== See also ==
- Dacha, a second or seasonal home in Russia
- Dacia (disambiguation)
