= Utku =

Utku is a Turkish given name for males and (rarely) females and a surname. It means 'victory'. Notable people with the name include:

== Given name (male) ==
- Utku Asuroglu, Turkish composer
- Taylan Utku Aydın, Turkish footballer
- Utku Çakırözer (born 1970), Turkish journalist and politician
- Utku Cihan Yalçınkaya, better known as Uzi, Turkish rapper
- Utku Dalmaz (born 1985), Turkish electronic dance music producer, jazz guitarist and web developer
- Utku Sen (born 1998), German footballer
- Utku Ünal (born 1983), Turkish musician
- Utku Yuvakuran (born 1997), Turkish football goalkeeper

== Surname ==
- Menderes Utku (born 1963), Turkish actor and businessman

== See also ==
- Utkuhiksalik
