= Donatella =

Donatella is an Italian feminine given name meaning "gift" or "gift of God".

== People ==
- Donatella Agostinelli (born 1974), Italian politician
- Donatella Arpaia (born 1971), American restaurateur and television chef
- Donatella Finocchiaro (born 1970), Italian actress
- Donatella Flick, former wife of Gert Rudolph Flick
- Donatella della Porta (born 1956), Italian political scientist
- Donatella Rettore (born 1955), Italian singer and songwriter
- Donatella Versace (born 1955), Italian fashion designer

== Entertainment ==
- Donatella Flick Conducting Competition, an international music competition for young conductors
- Donatella (film), a 1956 Italian comedy film directed by Mario Monicelli
- Donatella (group), an Italian music and television duo
- "Donatella", a 2013 song by Lady Gaga from Artpop
