= Jacey =

Jacey may refer to:

== Given name ==
- Jacey Eckhart, American military life consultant
- Jacey Harper (1980-) male sprint athlete
- Jacey Jetton (1983-) American politician and business owner
- Jacey Murphy (1989-) female Canadian rugby union player
- Jacey Sallés, British actress

== Family name ==
- Alyssa Jacey (1981-), American singer-songwriter, dancer and choreographer

== Other ==
- The Jacey Cinemas chain founded by Joseph Cohen
