= Maxie =

Maxie is a given name, a nickname and a surname which may refer to:

== People ==
=== Given name or nickname ===
- Max Baer (boxer) (1909–1959), American world champion heavyweight boxer, nicknamed "Madcap Maxie"
- Max Maxie Anderson (1934–1983), American hot air balloonist
- Maxie Baughan (1938–2023), American National Football League player
- Maxie Berger (1917–2000), Canadian world champion junior welterweight boxer
- O. Maxie Max Burns (born 1948), American politician
- Maxie Dunnam (born 1934), chancellor of Asbury Theological Seminary
- Maxie Patton Kizzire (born 1986), American golfer
- Maxie Lambright (1924–1980), American college football head coach
- Maxwell Maxie Long (1878–1959), American sprinter and 1900 Olympic champion
- James "Maxie" McCann (1934–2017), Irish soccer player
- Maxie Michael (born 1951), German (female) diver
- Maxie Minnaar (died 2020), Namibian (female) politician
- Maxwell Maxie Parks (born 1951), American sprinter
- "Slapsie Maxie" Max Rosenbloom (1907–1976), American world champion Hall-of-Fame light-heavyweight boxer
- Maxie Santillan Jr. (1956–2022), American actor
- Maxie Vaz (1923–1991), Indian field hockey player
- Maxie Wander (1933–1977), Austrian-born German (female) writer
- Maxie Williams (1940–2009), American Football League and National Football League player

=== Surname ===
- Brett Maxie (born 1962), American National Football League coach and former player
- Demetrious Maxie (born 1973), Canadian football player
- Leslie Maxie (born 1967), Olympic hurdler, host of the television show Cold Pizza
- Peggy Maxie (1936–2024), American former politician, first African-American woman elected to the Washington House of Representatives

== Fictional characters ==
- Maxie (Pokémon), the leader of Team Magma in the Pokémon series
- Maxie Jones, on the American soap opera General Hospital
- Maxie Malone, the title character of Maxie, a 1985 film starring Glenn Close as Maxie
- Maximilian Maxie Zeus, a DC Comics villain

== See also ==
- "Maxi", a nickname of Glenn Maxwell (born 1988), Australian cricketer
- "Maxy", a nickname of Michael Klinger (born 1980), Australian retired cricketer
- Max Hermann Maxy (1895–1971), Romanian painter and art professor
- Maxxie Oliver, a character in the British series Skins
