= Martie =

Martie is a given name. Notable people with the name include:

- Martie Cook, American screenwriter
- Martie Cordaro, American businessman
- Martie Duncan (born 1961 or 1962), American chef, blogger and party planner
- Martie Maguire (born 1969), American musician

== See also ==
- Marty (disambiguation)
