= Yuval (given name) =

Yuval (Hebrew: יוּבָל) is a Hebrew first name. It means stream, brook, or tributary. In the Hebrew Bible, Yuval (also Jubal) was the son of Lamech and Adah, a brother of Jabal, a descendant of Cain. He was named as the ancestor of all who played the lyre and pipe (see book of Genesis 4:20-21). Yuval is known as the father of music.

In Israel, Yuval (Yooval or Uval) is a common male and female name. While the name has Biblical origins, it does not have a strong religious connotation.

== People ==
- Yuval Avidor (born 1986), Israeli football player
- Yuval Aviv (born 1947), Israeli writer
- Yuval Banai (born 1962), Israeli musician
- Yuval Cherlow (born 1957), Israeli rabbi
- Yuval Dayan (born 1994), Israeli singer
- Yuval Diskin (born 1956), Israeli intelligence officer
- Yuval Elizur (1927-2019), Israeli journalist
- Yuval Filo (born 1998), Israeli Olympic rhythmic gymnast
- Yuval Flicker (born 1955), American mathematician
- Yuval Freilich (born 1995), Israeli épée fencer, 2019 European Epee Champion
- Yuval Fenichel (born 1982), ex-IDF Israeli-Canadian NSOC Team Lead, Toronto
- Yuval Fuchs (born 1961), Israeli diplomat
- Yuval Gabay (born 1963), Israeli drummer, member of Soul Coughing
- Yuval Harari (born 1976), Israeli historian
- Yuval Levin (born 1977), American writer
- Yuval Naimy (born 1985), Israeli basketball player
- Yuval Ne'eman (1925–2006), Israeli physicist, politician, and President of Tel Aviv University
- Yuval Neria (born 1952), Israeli psychologist
- Yuval Peres (born 1963), Israeli mathematician
- Yuval Pick (born 1970), Israeli dancer and choreographer
- Yuval Raphael (born 2000), Israeli singer and Eurovision Song Contest 2025 entrant
- Yuval Rotem (born 1959), Israeli diplomat
- Yuval Segal (born 1971), Israeli actor and comedian
- Yuval Semo (born 1972), Israeli actor
- Yuval Shabtay (born 1986), Israeli football player
- Yuval Shawat (born 1989), Israeli football player
- Yuval Spungin (born 1987), Israeli football player
- Yuval Steinitz (born 1958), Israeli politician
- Yuval Sznajderman (born 2002), Israeli basketball player
- Yuval Tal (born 1965), Israeli businessman
- Yuval Yairi (born 1961), Israeli artist
- Yuval Zaliouk (born 1939), Israeli conductor
- Yuval Zamir (1963-2011), Israeli actor
- Yuval Zellner (born 1978), Israeli politician
