= Sigi (disambiguation) =

Sigi is a mythical hero and a son of Odin in Norse legends.

Sigi or SIGI may also refer to:

== Places ==
- Sigi River, Tanzania
- Sigi Regency, Sulawesi, Indonesia

== People ==
- Sigi or Sigrid Burger (born 1996), South African netball player
- Sigi Feigel (1921–2004), Swiss attorney and activist against antisemitism and racism
- Siegfried Grabner (born 1975), Austrian snowboarder
- Sigi Holzbauer, West German slalom canoeist who competed in the mid-1950
- Sigi Lens (born 1963), Surinamese sports agent and former footballer
- Siegmund Nissel (1922–2008), Austrian-born British violinist
- Sigi Renz (1938–2025), German racing cyclist
- Sigmund Sigi Rothemund (1944–2024), German film director
- Sigi Schmid (1953–2018), German-American soccer coach
- Sigi Ziering (1928-2000), German-born American business executive, playwright and philanthropist
- Prince Sigismund of Prussia (1864–1866), nicknamed "Sigi"
- Marjorie Lynette Sigley (1928–1997), British artist, writer, theatre director and television producer

== Other uses ==
- Space Integrated GPS/INS
- Social Institutions and Gender Index
- Sigi (or Sigui), a festival of the Dogon people of Mali; see Dogon religion

== See also ==
- Sigurður (for which Siggi is a nickname)
