= Cyd Adams =

American poet and academic (1949–2005)

- Born: Cydney W. Adams; November 27, 1949; Rusk County, Texas, U.S.
- Died: May 15, 2005 (aged 55); Rusk County, Texas, U.S.
- Occupations: Professor; poet; farmer
- Writing career
- Notable works: New Texas and Labor That A Man Takes

Cydney W. "Cyd" Adams (November 27, 1949 – May 15, 2005) was an American poet and academic. Adams portrayed his background as an East Texas farmer and his passion for hard physical labor into his writing. Adams had a masterly, elegant way of writing about the trials and tribulations of the common working man. His depictions of East Texas and its people earned him the title of Poet Laureate of East Texas in 2001, and many of his poems are acknowledged as some of the best poetry written in any language. Adams was also a professor of English and literature at his alma mater, Stephen F. Austin State University in Nacogdoches, Texas, for nearly 30 years.

Much of Adams' work has been featured in literary magazines and in anthologies, and in the late 1990s, Adams began a creative partnership with his close friend and colleague Charles Jones, an art professor at SFA. The partnership resulted in the book "Blackjack Bull Pine and Post-Oak Glade." Some of his other books include "On the Perimeter" and "The Labor That a Man Takes." All of his publications are included in the Oxford University Library.

In addition to writing, he was a woodcarver, sculptor, bricklayer, gardener, and farmer.

Cyd Adams died in May 2005 in Nacogdoches. He is buried in Harmony Hill Cemetery in Rusk County, Texas, where his monument is engraved with his own epitaph.

One of Adams' best-known poems is sometimes titled either “July Wall Poem” or “Mason’s Man” and is a tribute to his father, W.T. Adams.
