= Kristoff =

Kristoff is a version of Kristopher respelling of Christopher. Notable people with the name include:

- Kristoff St. John (1966-2019), American actor.
- Ivan Kristoff (born 1968), aviator, rescue worker, and rope access expert
- Kristoff Raczyñski (born 1974), Mexican actor, film producer, screenwriter and TV host
- Kristoff Deprez (born 1981), Belgian footballer
- Alexander Kristoff (born 1987), Norwegian road bicycle racer
- Romano Kristoff, Spanish born actor, writer and director
- Kristoff Krane (born 1983), American alternative hip hop artist
- Jay Kristoff (born 1973), Australian author

== Fictional characters ==
- Kristoff (Frozen), a character from the 2013 Disney animated film, Frozen
- Kristoff Vernard (or Kristoff von Doom), a character appearing in the Marvel Comics universe

== See also ==
- Kristoff Presenta, Mexican television show
