= Zhenya =

Zhenya (Russian: Женя) is a given name, and a nickname for multiple Slavic names. Notable people with the name include:

- Zhenya Belousov (1964–1997), Soviet and Russian pop singer
- Zhenya Berkovich (Evgenia Berkovich; born 1985), Russian theatre director, playwright, and poet
- Zhenya Gay (1906–1978), American author and illustrator
- Zhenya Gershman, American painter
- Zhenya Medvedeva (Evgenia Medvedeva; born 1999), Russian figure skater
- Zhenya Plushenko (Evgeni Plushenko; born 1982), Russian Olympic figure skater
- Zhenya Wang (born 1981), Chinese-born Australian former senator and civil engineer

== See also ==
- Zhenya-class minesweeper, a class of Soviet warship
- Zhenya, Zhenechka and Katyusha, a 1967 film
- Zhenya, nickname of the Sopkarga mammoth
