= Sultan (name) =

Name list

- Gender: Male

Origin
- Origin: Arabic, Persian, Turkic

Other names
- Related names: Sultanat

Sultan (Arabic: سلطان) is a male given name and also a surname.

The word "sultan" is derived from the Arabic triliteral root S-L-T س-ل-ط. According to Ibn Manzur's Lisan al-Arab dictionary, sultān originally mean "proof" or "authority" and was later applied to a governor or ruler, with plural form salātīn.

== Contemporary Usage ==
The name gained currency throughout the Arab and Islamic worlds, retaining its popularity due to the connotations of strength and prestige associated with it. Its also adopted as an honorific title in certain communities.

== Given name ==
- Sultan Ali al-Arada (born 1959), Yemeni politician
- Sultan Bahu (1628–1691), Muslim Sufi and saint and Punjabi poet
- Sultan Haydar (born 1985), Turkish female long-distance runner
- Sultan Ibragimov (born 1975), Russian boxer
- Sultan bin Mohammed Al Kabeer (born 1954), Saudi royal and businessman
- Sultan Kigab (1955–2024), Sudanese-Canadian swimmer
- Sultan Kösen (born 1982), Turkish World Guinness record holder for tallest living male
- Sultan Ali Lakhani (born 1948), Pakistani businessman
- Sultan Bashiruddin Mahmood (born 1940), Pakistani engineer
- Sultan Munadi (1976–2009), Afghan journalist
- Sultan bin Khalifa Al Nahyan (born 1965), Emirati military officer, businessman and royal
- Sultan Ahmad Nanupuri (1914–1997), Bangladeshi Islamic scholar and teacher
- Sultan Rahi (1938–1996), Pakistani film actor
- Sultan bin Abdulaziz Al Saud (1928–2011), Saudi royal and government official
- Sultan bin Abdullah Al Saud (born 1995), Saudi royal and businessman
- Sultan bin Fahd Al Saud (born 1951), Saudi royal
- Sultan Zarawani (born 1961), Emirati cricketer
- Sultan (rapper) (born 1987), mononym for a French hip hop artist

== Surname ==
- Abida Sultan (1913–2002), member of a royal family in Bhopal, India
- Ameer Sultan (born 1967), Indian film director
- Dan Sultan (born 1983), Australian musician
- Daniel Isom Sultan (1885–1947), American army general
- Faris Al-Sultan (born 1978), German triathlete
- Grete Sultan (1906–2005), German-American pianist
- Kishwar Sultan (1936–2002), Pakistani singer
- Sajida Sultan (1915–1995), 12th Nawab Begum of Bhopal, India, sister of Abida Sultan
- Tipu Sultan (journalist) (born 1973), Bangladeshi journalist
- Wafa Sultan (born 1958), Syrian-American vocal critic of Islam
