= Cemre =

Cemre may refer to:

- In Turkish folklore, three embers sent by a genie fall from the heavens at the end of the winter, and in turn, warm up the air, the water and the earth, one by one. The first cemre falls on the air on/around the 20th of February (i.e. first the air warms up); the second cemre falls on the water a week later (i.e. the water warms up next, melting snow and ice); and finally, another week later, the third and last cemre falls on the earth (the frozen soil melts).
- A popular Turkish girl's name.
- Cemre, Kaş: A village in southern Turkey.

== People ==
- Cemre Baysel (born 1999), Turkish actress
- Cemre Erol (born 1992), Turkish volleyball player
- Cemre Fere (born 1994), Turkish badminton player
- Cemre Kendirci (born 2004), Turkish artistic gymnast
- Betül Cemre Yıldız (born 1989), Turkish chess player
