= Ufuk =

- Pronunciation: [uˈfuk]

Origin
- Meaning: horizon

Ufuk is a unisex Turkish given name meaning "horizon". It stems from the Arabic ufuq (أفق), having the same meaning, as does the corresponding Hebrew name "אופק". The name may refer to:

== People ==
- Ufuk Akçiğit (born 1980), Turkish economist
- Ufuk Bayraktar (born 1981), Turkish actor
- Ufuk Budak (born 1990), Azerbaijani football player
- Ufuk Ceylan (born 1986), Turkish football player
- Ufuk Özbek (born 1992), Turkish-German football player
- Ufuk Sarıca (born 1972), Turkish basketball coach
- Ufuk Talay (born 1976), Australian football player
- Ufuk Uras (born 1959), Turkish politician

== See also ==
- Ufuk University, Turkey
