= Winter (given name) =

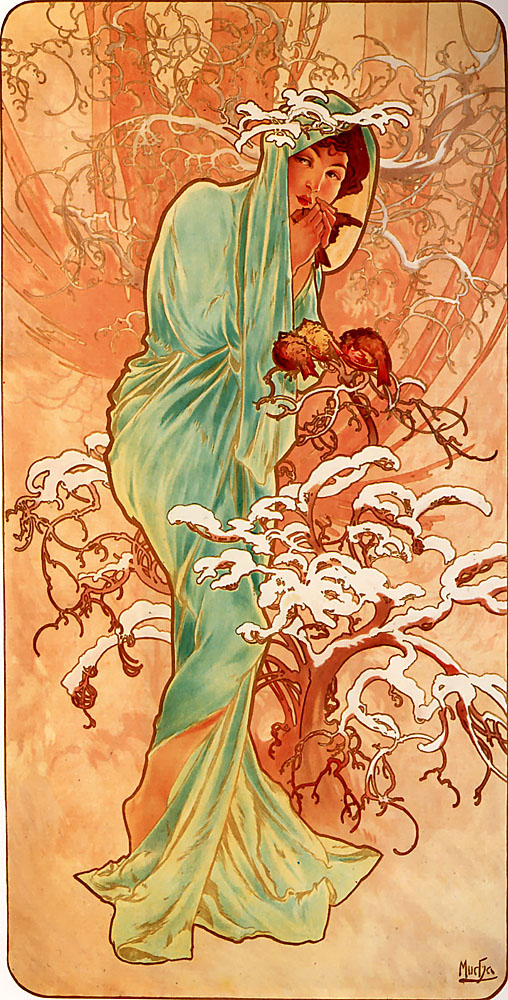
- Winter, an 1896 Art Nouveau illustration by Alfons Mucha.
- Gender: Unisex

Origin
- Origin: English
- Meaning: "winter”

Other names
- Related names: Winterr, Winterrose, Winters, Wynter, Wynterrose

Winter is a unisex given name of English origin given in reference to the season. In some instances, the given name is a transferred use of the surname.

The name has been in regular use across the English-speaking world. It has ranked among the top 1,000 names for newborn girls in England and Wales since 2014 and among the top 300 names since 2020. It has ranked among the top 1,000 names for newborn girls in the United States since 2012 and among the top 400 names since 2018. The name has also been in use for boys since the 19th century, though it has been more commonly used for girls in the 21st century. Spelling variant Wynter is also well-used. Elaborations of the name such as Winterrose and Wynterrose are also in use.

The popularity of the name coincides with the increase in usage of other season names for girls such as Autumn and Summer as well as other names inspired by the natural world. The name has also been used by celebrities for their children and for characters in books and films, which might have brought it to the attention of parents.

== Men ==
- Winter Hall (1872–1947), New Zealand actor
- Winter Mumba (died 1993), Zambian footballer
- Winter Prather (1926–2005), American photographer
- Winter Charles Renouf (1868–1954), British philatelist
- Winter Warden (1860–1936), Australian politician

== Women ==
- Winter Miller (born 1973), American playwright and journalist
- Winter Vinecki (born 1998), American marathon runner
- Winter Zoli (born 1980), American actress and model
- Winter (dolphin) (2008–2021), bottlenose dolphin with a prosthetic tail

== Stage name ==
- Winter, stage name of South Korean singer and dancer Kim Min-jeong (born 2001)
- Winter Williams, stage name of American actress Ashley Williams (born 1984)
