= Wahyu =

Wahyu may refer to:

== People ==
Given name

- Wahyu Gunawan (b. 1985), Indonesian footballer

Surname

- AA Ngurah Wahyu, Indonesian footballer
- F.X. Yanuar Wahyu, Indonesian footballer
- Fredyan Wahyu, Indonesian footballer
- Didik Wahyu, Indonesian footballer

== Other uses ==
- Taman Wahyu, a residential area in Kampung Batu, Kuala Lumpur, Malaysia
