= Saša Martinović =

Saša Martinović may refer to:

- Saša Martinović (ice hockey player) (born 1984), Croatian professional ice hockey player
- Saša Martinović (chess player) (born 1991), Croatian chess player
