= Ev (given name) =

Ev is a given name, often a short form (hypocorism) of Everett or Evan. It may refer to:

- Ev Faunce (1926–2009), American football player and college head coach
- Ev Miller (born 1952), New Zealand former cricketer
- Ev Rogers (1931–2004), American communication theorist and sociologist
- Ev Rowan (1902–1956), American football player
- Ev Sharp (1918–1996), American football player
- Evan "Ev" Williams (born 1972), founder of Twitter
