= Donatello (disambiguation) =

Donatello was an Italian Renaissance sculptor.

Donatello may refer to:

- Donatello Brown (born 1991), American football player
- Donatello (Teenage Mutant Ninja Turtles), a fictional character in the Teenage Mutant Ninja Turtles series
- Donatello (singer), an Italian singer
- Donatello Stefanucci (1896–1987), Italian painter
- Carmine Crocco (1830–1905), also known as Donatello, an Italian brigand
- Donatello, one of the three Multi-Purpose Logistics Modules.
- David di Donatello, the Italian film award
