= Teal (name) =

Teal is an English surname and a given name which may refer to:

== Surname ==
- Angeline Teal (1842-1913), American novelist and short story writer
- Clare Teal (born 1973), English jazz singer
- Gordon Kidd Teal (1907–2003), American engineer who developed the first silicon transistor
- Jeff Teal (born 1960), American ice hockey forward
- Joseph Nathan Teal (1858–1929), American lawyer and public figure in Oregon
- Larry Teal (1905–1984), American saxophonist
- Paul Teal (1989–2024), American actor
- Quinton Teal (born 1984), American football defensive back
- Ray Teal (1902–1976), American actor
- Robert Teal (born 1967), Australian rules footballer
- Skip Teal (1933–2006), Canadian ice hockey player
- Vic Teal (born 1949), Canadian ice hockey player
- Willie Teal (born 1957), American football cornerback

== Given name ==
- Teal Bunbury (born 1980), Canadian-American soccer player
- Teal Fowler (born 1970), American ice hockey player and coach
- Teal Grindle (born 2000), British artistic gymnast
- Teal Harle (born 1996), Canadian freestyle skier
- Teal Marchande (born 1965), American actress
- Teal Piper (born 1985), American actress and professional wrestler
- Teal Redmann (born 1982), American actress who played a recurring character in Gilmore Girls in seasons 1–4
- Teal Sherer, American actress
- Teal Swan (born 1984), American spiritual influencer and author
- Teal Wicks (born 1982), American singer and stage actress

== Fictional characters ==
- Claud Eustace Teal, a policeman foil for the character Simon Templar, created by Leslie Charteris
- the eponymous heroine of Belle Teal, a 2001 novel by Ann M. Martin
- A title character of The Adventures of Abney & Teal, children's television programme
- Diplomatic Officer Chloe Alice Teal, from the British science fiction television series Hyperdrive

== See also ==
- Teale
- Tele (disambiguation)
