= Whit (given name) =

Whit is a given name and nickname which may refer to:

People:

- Whit Bissell (1909–1996), American actor
- Whit Burnett (1900–1972), American writer
- Whit Canale (1941–2011) American football player
- Whit Cunliffe (1876–1966), English singer
- Whit Dickey (born 1954), American jazz drummer
- Whit Haydn (born 1949), American magician
- Whit Hertford (born 1978), American actor
- Whit Holcomb-Faye (born 1984), American basketball player
- Whit Johnson, American television journalist
- Whit Marshall (born 1973), American football player
- Whit Merrifield (born 1989), American baseball player
- Whit Stillman (born 1952), American writer
- Whit Taylor (American football) (born 1960), American football player
- Whit Taylor (cartoonist), American cartoonist
- Whit Tucker, Canadian football player
- Whit Watson (born 1971), American sportscaster
- Whit Weeks (born 2005), American football player
- Whit Williams (born 1973), American saxophonist
- Whit Wyatt (1907–1999), American baseball player

Fictional characters and pen names:

- Whit Masterson, pen name of a partnership of American authors Robert Allison "Bob" Wade and H. Bill Miller
- Whit Sterling, a main character in the 1947 film noir Out of the Past, played by Kirk Douglas
