= Shiloh (given name) =

- Gender: Unisex

Origin
- Origin: Hebrew
- Meaning: "He Who It Is"
- Region of origin: Israel

Shiloh, Shylo or Shilo is a unisex given name.

== Biblical reference ==
Shiloh is a biblical place name in the tribal holdings of Ephraim, mentioned in Joshua 18:1, I Samuel 1:9, and elsewhere.

== Popularity ==
The name was the 803rd most popular name for girls born in the United States in 2007, 650th in 2008, 604th by 2009, and 620th by 2010. The name had previously been used occasionally for boys and girls, though it was never previously among the top 1,000 names for any gender in the United States.

In the United States, the name has associations with the Southern United States due to the Battle of Shiloh, a major battle of the United States Civil War, and to many towns named Shiloh in southern states, which were usually named after the town in the Bible.

== People named Shiloh ==
- Shiloh Fernandez (born 1985), American actor
- Shiloh Hoganson (born 1993), Canadian singer-songwriter
- Shiloh Keo (born 1987), American football player
- Shlomit Malka (born 1993), Israeli fashion model sometimes called Shiloh Malka
- Shilo Sanders (born 2000), American football player
- Shiloh Strong (born 1978), American actor, screenwriter, photographer and film director
- Shilow Tracey (born 1998), English footballer, currently at Crewe Alexandra
- Shiloh Walker (born 1976), American author of erotic romance novels and novellas
