= Carey (given name) =

Carey is a given name. Notable people with the name include:

- Carey Bell (1936–2007), American blues musician
- Carey Blyton (1932–2002), British composer
- Carey Cavanaugh (born 1955), former U.S. Ambassador/peace mediator
- Carey Davis (born 1981), former American football fullback
- Carey Foster (1835–1919), a chemist and physicist
- Carey Harrison (1944–2025), English novelist and dramatist
- Carey Hart (born 1975), American former professional freestyle motocross competitor
- Carey W. Hayes (born 1961), American screenwriter and producer
- Carey Lohrenz (born 1968), former lieutenant
- Carey Lowell (born 1961), American actress
- Carey McWilliams (journalist) (1905–1980), American journalist and lawyer
- Carey McWilliams (marksman) (born 1973), blind marksman, author, and skydiver
- Carey Mercer (born 1975), Canadian musician
- Carey D. Miller (1895–1985), American food scientist
- Carey Mulligan (born 1985), English actress
- Carey Loftin (1914–1997), American professional stuntman, stunt coordinator and actor
- Carey Orr (1890–1967), American editorial cartoonist
- Carey Price (born 1987), Canadian professional hockey player
- Carey Schueler (born 1974), The daughter of former Chicago White Sox General Manager Ron Schueler
- Carey Wilber (1916–1998), journalist and television writer
- Carey Wilson (ice hockey) (born 1962), Canadian ice hockey centre
- Carey Wilson (writer) (1889–1962), American screenwriter, voice actor, and producer

== Fictional characters ==
- Carey Martin, in the Disney Channel sitcoms The Suite Life of Zack & Cody and The Suite Life on Deck

== See also ==
- Carey (disambiguation)
- Carey (surname)
- Carry (name)
- Karey (disambiguation)
