= Zia (name) =

Zia (also spelled Ziya, Ḍiya , Dia or Diya, Arabic: ضياء) is a name of Arabic origin somewhat translating to "shine" or "light," or more closely, "luminous."

Zia also is the last part of the nation "Circassia," and in this context means "land of," e.g., Cerkes (from the Circassians) Abdullah Zia Efendi.

Notable people with this name include:

== Given name ==
- Zia Cooke (born 2001), American basketball player
- Ziaur Rahman, Bangladeshi military officer and politician who served as the sixth President of Bangladesh
- Zia Mohiuddin Dagar (1929–1990), popularly known as Z. M. Dagar, Indian musician
- Dia Abdul Zahra Kadim, Iraqi Shiite leader
- Zia Inayat-Khan, (aka Pir Zia), spiritual leader of the Sufi Order International
- Zia Mahmood, (born 1946), Pakistani contract bridge player
- Zia McCabe, (born 1975), American musician and founding member of The Dandy Warhols
- Zia Mian, Pakistani physicist and nuclear expert
- Zia Mody, Indian legal consultant and businesswoman
- Zia Mohyeddin (born 1931–2023), Pakistani actor
- Zia Uddin (born 1941), Bangladeshi Islamic scholar and politician
- Zia Ul Shah, citizen of Pakistan held by the United States in Guantanamo
- Ziya Tong, Canadian television host
- Ziya Bazhaev (1960–2024), Chechen businessman
- Zia-Allah Ezazi Maleki, Iranian Politician
- Diaa al-Din Dawoud (1926–2011), Egyptian politician
- Ziauddin Sardar (born 1951), Pakistani writer on Islam
- Ziyaettin Doğan or Ziya Doğan (born 1961), Turkish football manager
- Ziauddin Rizvi (died 2005), Shi'a cleric from Gilgit
- Ziaeddin Niknafs (born 1986), Iranian Footballer
- Ziauddin Butt, a Pakistani military officer jailed as a result of the 1999 Pakistani coup d'état
- Ziauddin (Afghan militia leader), Afghan militia leader
- Ziauddin (cricketer), Pakistani cricketer
- Zia Yusuf (born 1986/1987), British businessman and politician

== Surname ==
- Grace Zia Chu (1899–1999) author of Chinese cookbook
- Helen Zia (born 1952), American journalist
- Junaid Zia (born 1983), Pakistani cricketer
- Khaleda Zia (1945–2025), Bangladeshi politician, prime minister of Bangladesh
- Muhammad Zia-ul-Haq, sixth president of Pakistan
- Sameer Zia (born 1981), sportsman from the United Arab Emirates
- Yasin Zia, former Chief of General Staff for Afghanistan

== Known as ==
- Anastasia de Torby (1892–1977), also known as Lady Zia Wernher, Russian aristocrat
- Park Ji-a (born 1972), South Korean actress also known as Zia
- Park Ji-hye (born 1986), South Korean singer known by the stage name Zia

== Fictional characters ==
- Zia, a character in the animated television series The Mysterious Cities of Gold
- Zia, a character in The Red Pyramid novel
- Zia, the main character in the film Wristcutters: A Love Story
- Zia, a character in the video game Bastion
- Dr. Zia Rodriguez, a character in the film Jurassic World: Fallen Kingdom
- Zianna, the main character in the fantasy world Linboa
- Richard Zia, American author of Reared by Wolves, and a patriarchal descendant of the Ancient Kabardian House of Talostan
