= Adar (disambiguation) =

Adar is a month of the Hebrew calendar. Adar may also refer to:

== Places ==
- `Adar, a village in Yemen
- Adar, Iran, a village in Iran
- Adar River in the state of Upper Nile, South Sudan
- Adar oilfield in South Sudan

== Other uses ==
- Adar (surname)
- Atar or Adar, a Middle Persian term for Zoroastrian fire
- ADAR, a type of Adenosine deaminase acting on RNA
- Adar (Mandaean month), a month of the Mandaean calendar
- "Adar" (The Lord of the Rings: The Rings of Power), an episode of the first season of The Lord of the Rings: The Rings of Power
  - The character introduced in the same episode of the show
