= Jemina =

Jemina is the name of:

- Jemina Pearl (born 1987), American singer, formerly the frontwoman of Be Your Own Pet
- Jemina Staalo, a Finnish writer
