= Katsumi =

- Pronunciation: [katsɯmi]
- Gender: Unisex

Origin
- Origin: Japanese
- Meaning: It can have many different meanings depending on the kanji used

Katsumi (かつみ, カツミ)

Katsumi Tarumi (Justice of the Supreme Court of Japan)

is a common Japanese given name used by either sex.

== Written forms ==
Katsumi can be written using different kanji characters and can mean:

as a given name

- 克己, "overcome, self/oneself"
- 克巳, "overcome, sixth earthly branch"
- 克美, "overcome, beauty"
- 勝己, "win, self/oneself"
- 勝巳, "win, sixth earthly branch"
- 勝美, "win, beauty"
- 勝実, "win, substance (or fruit)"

The name can also be written in hiragana or katakana.

as a surname

- 勝見, "win, look"

== People with the name ==
- Akinoshima Katsumi (安芸乃島 勝巳; born 1967), Japanese sumo wrestler
- Katsumi Asaba (浅葉 克己; born 1940), Japanese art director
- Katsumi Chou (長 克巳; born 1951), Japanese voice actor
- Katsumi Fukura (福良 勝己; born 1953), Japanese high jumper
- Katsumi Matsumura (松村 勝美; born 1944), Japanese volleyball player
- Katsumi Nakamura (中村 克; born 1994), Japanese swimmer
- Katsumi Nishikawa (西河 克己; 1918–2010), Japanese film director
- Katsumi Oda (小田 勝美; born 1952), Japanese volleyball player
- Katsumi Oenoki (大榎 克己; born 1965), Japanese football player
- Katsumi Ōno (大野 勝己; 1905–2006), Japanese diplomat
- Katsumi Shibata (柴田 勝巳; 1909–1940), Japanese field hockey player
- Katsumi Suzuki (鈴木 勝美; born 1956), Japanese voice actor
- Katsumi Tezuka (手塚 勝巳; 1912–?), Japanese actor
- Katsumi Toriumi (鳥海 勝美; born 1963), Japanese voice actor
- Katsumi Yanagishima (柳島 克巳; born 1950), Japanese cinematographer
- Katsumi Watanabe (渡部 勝美; born 1962), Japanese baseball player
- Katsumi Yamamoto (racing driver) (山本 勝巳, born 1973), Japanese racing driver
- Katsumi Yamamoto (rowing) (山本 克美; born 1946), Japanese rower
- Katsumi Yokota (横田 克己), Japanese video game designer
- Katsumi Yusa (遊佐 克美; born 1988), Japanese footballer
- Céline Tran (born 1979), stage names either Katsumi or Katsuni, French pornographic actress

== People with the surname ==
- Tomejirō Katsumi (勝見 留次郎), one of the victims killed by Norio Nagayama
- Yosuke Katsumi (勝見 洋介), the 2016 champion of the All Japan Kendo Championship
- Motoi Katsumi (勝見 基), Captain of the Japanese destroyer Tanikaze (1940)

== Fictional characters ==
- Katsumi Akagi (カツミ), a character in the manga and anime series Project ARMS
- Katsumi Kabuto (克美), a character in the manga series Tenjho Tenge
- Katsumi Kajio (克美), a character in the tokusatsu series Ultraman Gaia
- Katsumi Minato (カツミ), a character in the tokusatsu series Ultraman R/B
- Katsumi Kelly, a character in the 1957 film Sayonara (1957 film)
- Katsumi Daido, a character in the 2010 movie Kamen Rider W Forever: A to Z/The Gaia Memories of Fate
- Katsumi Kida (克美), a character in the tokusatsu series Kamen Rider Black
- Katsumi Liqueur, a character in the manga and anime series Silent Möbius
- Katsumi Sako (克己), a character in the manga and live-action drama series Life
- Katsumi Orochi, a character in the manga and anime series Grappler Baki
