= Yarden =

Yarden or similar can mean:

== People ==
- Yarden Cohen (footballer, born 1991) (born 1991), Israeli footballer
- Yarden Cohen (footballer, born 1997) (born 1997), Israeli footballer
- Yarden (Musician, born 2000) - A Nigerian musician
- Yarden Gerbi (born 1989), Israeli world champion judoka and Olympic bronze medalist
- Nurit Yarden (born 1959), Israeli art photographer

== Places ==
- Jordan (name), as a name, comes from Yarden (ירדן), meaning "one who descends"
- Jordan River, a river in West Asia flowing to the Dead Sea
- Mishmar HaYarden, Israeli moshav
- Mishmar HaYarden (moshava), Israeli moshava destroyed during the 1948 Palestine war
- Yardena, Israeli moshav
- Yardna or yardena, used to refer to rivers in Mandaeism

== Other ==
- Yarden wine, label of Israeli Golan Heights Winery
