= Sherley =

Sherley is a surname and given name. Notable people with the surname and given name include:

Surname:

- Douglass Sherley (1857–1917), author, journalist, and poet
- Glen Sherley (1936–1978), country singer-songwriter, wrote Johnny Cash's 1968 song Greystone Chapel
- Haydn Sherley (1924–2007), New Zealand radio personality
- J. Swagar Sherley (1871–1941), U.S. Representative from Kentucky
- James Sherley, biological engineer at Boston Biomedical Research Institute

Given name:

- Sherley Moore (1895–1971), American baseball player
- Sherley Anne Williams (1944–1999), American poet, novelist, professor, vocalist, jazz poet, playwright and social critic

== See also ==
- Shirley (disambiguation)
- Shurley
