= Zan =

Zan or ZAN, may refer to:

== Geography ==
- Zhan, Kurdistan, Iran, also known as Zān
- Zhan, Lorestan, Iran, also known as Žān
- Zan, Tehran, a village in Tehran Province, Iran
- Zan, Lebanon

== Ethnicity and language ==
- Zans, a subethnic group speaking the Zan languages
- Zan Gula language, an Adamawa language of Chad
- Zan languages, a proposed collective term for the Megrelian and Laz languages in the 7th century Caucasus

== People ==
=== Given name ===
- Zan Abeyratne, backing singer in Models
- Žan Benedičič (born 1994) Slovenian soccer player
- Žan Celar (born 1999) Slovenian soccer player
- Zan Ganassa (1540–1584) Italian actor
- Zan Wesley Holmes Jr., American minister
- Žan Jakše, Slovenian canoeist
- Žan Kranjec (born 1992) Slovenian alpine skier
- Žan Marolt (1964–2009) Bosnia-Herzegovina actor
- Zan Rowe (born 1978) Australian radio personality
- Žan Tabak (born 1970) Canadian basketball player

=== Surname ===
- Alessandro Zan (born 1973) Italian politician
- Gökhan Zan (born 1981) Turkish footballer
- Zan (surname), a Chinese surname (昝)

=== Other people ===
- Zinny J. Zan, Swedish singer Bo Stagman (born 1964)
- Zan, a soca music singer who has recorded with Patrice Roberts
- Elisha A. Anderson (1866–1941), nicknamed Zan, American lawyer and politician
- Italo De Zan (1925–2020), Italian racing cyclist

== Fictional characters ==
- Zan, the eagle in Guardians of Ga'Hoole
- Zan, the main character in the video game Rising Zan: The Samurai Gunman
- Zan, the male Wonder Twin in the American animated Hanna-Barbera TV series Super Friends
- Zan Owlson, the female acting CEO of Glomgold Industries in the 2017 reboot of DuckTales
- Zan Partizane, one of the characters in Kirby Star Allies

== Media ==
- Zan, a Japanese film created by Yoshitaka Amano
- Zan (newspaper), an Iranian newspaper
- Zan TV, Afghan women's TV station

== Music ==
- Zan, an album by Shohreh Solati
- "Zan" (song), a 1999 song by Dir En Grey
- "Zan", song by Gackt released as "Setsugekka (The End of Silence)"/"Zan" in 2009

== Video games ==
- Zan: Yasha Enbukyoku
- Zan II: Spirits

== Other uses ==
- Anchorage Air Route Traffic Control Center
- Chinese hairpin (簪)
- Zanzibar, a part of Tanzania, East Africa
- Zantop International Airlines, United States (ICAO code)
- Zonadhesin, encoded by the ZAN gene

== See also ==
- Zan Zan (Hangul: 짠짠), K-pop band
