= Halbert (disambiguation) =

A halbert is a two-handed pole weapon.

Halbert may also refer to:

== People with the given name Halbert ==
- Halbert E. Paine (1826–1905), lawyer, politician, and general in the Union Army during the American Civil War
- Halbert L. Dunn (1896–1975), American physician and biostatistician
- Halbert S. Greenleaf (1827–1906), member of the United States House of Representatives
- Halbert White (1950–2012), American economist
- Halbert Owen Woodward (1918–2000), American judge
- Halbert W. Brooks (1885–1963), member of the Wisconsin State Assembly

== People with the surname Halbert ==
- Auren Halbert (born 2002), Canadian sledge hockey player
- Chick Halbert (1919–2013), American professional basketball player
- Clarence Halbert (1874–?), American lawyer and academic
- Fernand Halbert (20th century), Belgian athlete
- J. E. Halbert (1850–1892), American physician and politician
- James Nathaniel Halbert (1871–1948), Irish entomologist
- John Halbert (born 1937), Australian rules footballer
- Hugh Halbert (1910–1997), Australian politician
- Robert Henry Halbert (1870–1943), Canadian agrarian activist and politician
- Sherrill Halbert (1901–1991), American judge
- Thomas Halbert (c.1808–1865), English-born New Zealand whaler, trader and founding father

== Fictional characters ==
- King Halbert, a character in Nexo Knights
- Macy Halbert, a character in Nexo Knights
- Queen Halbert, a character in Nexo Knights

== See also ==
- Halbert Township, Martin County, Indiana
- Hal (disambiguation)
