= Geena =

Geena may refer to:

- Geena Davis (born 1956), American actress, producer, writer, athlete, and former fashion model
- Geena Gregory, a character in the soap opera Coronation Street
