= Whitfield (given name) =

Whitfield is a masculine given name borne by:

- Whitfield Connor (1916–1988), American actor, director and producer
- Whitfield Cook (1909–2003), American writer of screenplays, stage plays, short stories and novels
- Whitfield Crane (born 1968), American rock singer
- Whitfield Daukes (1877–1954), Anglican bishop
- Whitfield Diffie (born 1944), American cryptographer and mathematician
- Whitfield Jack (1906–1989), US Army officer
- Whitfield Lovell (born 1959), African-American artist
