= Abimbola =

- Gender: Unisex
- Language: Yoruba

Origin
- Meaning: born with wealth

Other names
- Variant forms: Bimbo, Bola

Abimbola audio is both a Yoruba surname and a unisex given name meaning "born with wealth".

== Notable people with the name include:- ==
- Elizabeth Abimbola Awoliyi (1910–1971), Nigerian physician
- Victor Abimbola Olaiya (1930–2020), Nigerian musician
- Bola Abimbola, Nigerian musician
- Wande Abimbola (born 1932), Nigerian academic
- Abimbola Adelakun, Nigerian writer
- Abimbola Alao (born 1967), Nigerian writer
- Abimbola Afolami (born 1986), British politician
- Abimbola Ogunbanjo, Nigerian executive
- Abimbola Omololu-Mulele, Nigerian lawyer and educationist

Notable people with the diminutive name form include:

- Bimbo Ademoye, Nigerian actress
- Bimbo Akintola, Nigerian actress
- Bimbo Manuel, Nigerian actor
- Bimbo Oloyede, Nigerian journalist
- Bimbo Odukoya, Nigerian televangelist
- Bimbo Oshin, Nigerian actress
