= Dakota Lane =

American novelist

- Born: 1959; New York City, U.S.
- Education: San Francisco State University
- Occupations: Young Adult Writer and Illustrator
- Children: two daughters, Alex and Hailey
- Writing career
- Notable works: Johnny Voodoo; The Orpheus Obsession; The Secret Life of IT Girls; Gothic Lolita

Dakota Lane (born in Brooklyn, New York in 1959) is an author. She has been nominated for an American Library Association award three times and cited as a Best Book for Young Adults for Johnny Voodoo and 2008 Quick Picks for Reluctant Young Adult Readers.

== Awards ==
- 1997 American Library Association Best Books for Young Adults, Johnny Voodoo
- 2000 Young Adult Library Services Association (YALSA) List of Popular Paperbacks for Young Adults
- 2008 YALSA List of Quick Picks for Reluctant Young Adult Readers, The Secret Life of IT Girls

== Bibliography ==
- Johnny Voodoo (Random House, 1997)
- The Orpheus Obsession (HarperCollins, 2006)
- The Secret Life of It Girls (Simon & Schuster, 2007)
- Gothic Lolita (Simon & Schuster, 2008)
