= Del (given name) =

Del is a given name, often a short form (hypocorism) of other names, such as Delmer or Delmas. People bearing the name include:

== Men ==
- Del M. Anderson (born 1937) American academic administrator, former college president, model
- Del Andrews (1894–1942), American film director and screenwriter
- Del Baker (1892–1973), American baseball player, coach, and manager
- Del Ballard Jr. (born 1963), American ten-pin bowler
- Del Barber (born 1983), Canadian singer-songwriter, musician, and record producer
- Del Bissonette (1899–1972), American baseball player, coach, and manager
- Del Boy, fictional character
- Del Bryan (born 1967), English boxer
- Del Close (1934–1999), American actor and writer
- Del Courtney (1910–2006), American jazz bandleader
- Del Crandall (1930–2021), American baseball player and manager
- Del de Guzman (born 1963), Filipino politician
- Del Dettmar (born 1947), English rock keyboardist
- Del Ennis (1925–1996), American baseball player
- Del Flanagan (1928–2003), American boxer
- Del Fontaine (1904–1935), Canadian boxer and convicted murderer born Raymond Henry Bousquet
- Del Gainer (1886–1947), American baseball player
- Del Harris (born 1937), American basketball coach
- Del Harris (squash player) (born 1969), English former squash player
- Del Henney (1935–2019), British actor
- Del Hodgkinson (born 1939), English rugby league player
- Del Howison (born 1953), American horror writer and actor
- Del McCoury (born 1939), American bluegrass and country musician
- Del Moore (1916–1970), American comedian, actor, and radio announcer
- Del Reeves (1932–2007), American country singer
- Del Shannon (1934-1990), American rock and roll musician
- Del Speer (born 1970), American football player
- Del Taylor, American politician
- Del tha Funkee Homosapien (short for "Delvon"), American hip hop artist
- Del Thompson (born 1958), American football player
- Del Webb (1899–1974), American real estate developer and baseball owner

== Women ==
- Del Delker (1924–2018), American gospel singer
- Del Harrison, American comedian and actress
- Del Martin (1921–2008), American feminist and gay rights activist
