= Liel =

Liel may refer to:

- Karl Friedrich von Liel (1799–1863), Bavarian Major General and War Minister
- Liel Kolet (born 1989), an Israeli singer
- Liel Leibovitz (born 1976), an Israeli-American journalist
- Liel Zaguri (born 1990), an Israeli footballer
