= Arlie =

Arlie is a given name. Notable people with the name include:

- Arlie F. Culp (1926-2017), Republican member of the North Carolina General Assembly, USA
- Arlie Russell Hochschild (born 1940), professor of sociology at the University of California, Berkeley
- Arlie Latham (1860–1952), American third baseman in Major League Baseball from 1880 to 1909
- Arlie Mucks (1891–1967), American track and field athlete who competed in the 1912 Summer Olympics
- Arlie Neaville, American gospel singer and songwriter
- Arlie Petters (born 1964), Belizean American mathematical physicist, professor at Duke University
- Arlie Pond (1873–1930), American major league baseball pitcher and doctor in the U.S. Army
- Arlie Schardt (1895–1980), American athlete who competed mainly in the 3000 metre team
- Arlie William Schorger (born 1884), chemical researcher and businessman who also did work in ornithology
- Arlie Tarbert (1904–1946), reserve outfielder in Major League Baseball who played 1927–1928
