= Kosar =

Kosar may refer to:

== People with the name ==
- Bernie Kosar (born 1963), American football quarterback
- Ingrid Kosar (born 1948), American inventor
- Scott Kosar (born 1963), American screenwriter

== Other uses ==
- Kosar people, tribe mentioned in the ancient Tamil literature
- Kosar Point, headland of Alexander Island, Antarctica

== See also ==
- Kowsar (disambiguation)
