= Kowsar (disambiguation) =

Kowsar is an Iranian land-based anti-ship missile.

Kowsar may also refer to:

== Places ==
- Kowsar, Khuzestan, Iran
- Kowsareh, Khuzestan Province, Iran
- Kowsar County, Ardabil Province, Iran

== Sports ==
- Kowsar Lorestan F.C., an Iranian football club
- Kowsar Isfahan F.C., an Iranian football club

== Other uses ==
- HESA Kowsar, an Iranian fighter jet aircraft
- Kowsar Women Football League, Iranian women's football league
- Nikahang Kowsar (born 1969), Canadian cartoonist
- Al-Kawthar, 108th chapter of the Qur'an

== See also ==
- Kowsari, a surname
- Kausar, a given name
- Kosar (disambiguation)
- Kothar (disambiguation)
