= Take-out =

Prepared food purchased with the intent to eat elsewhere

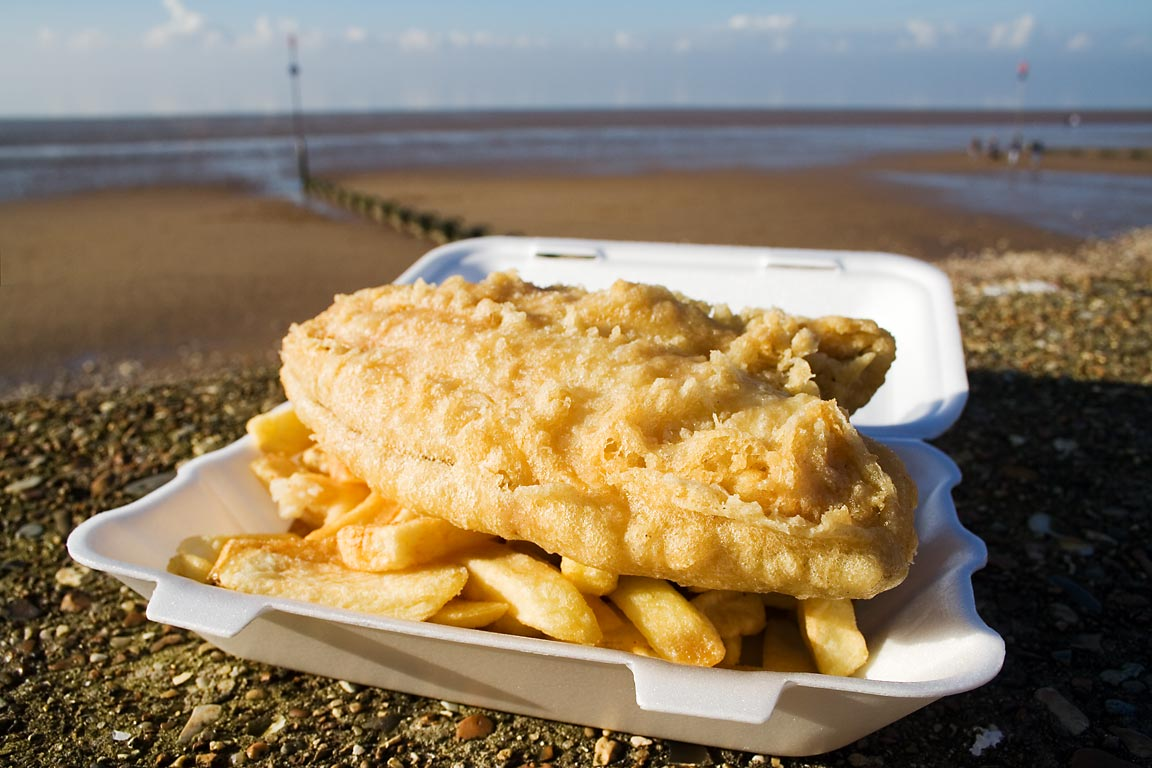
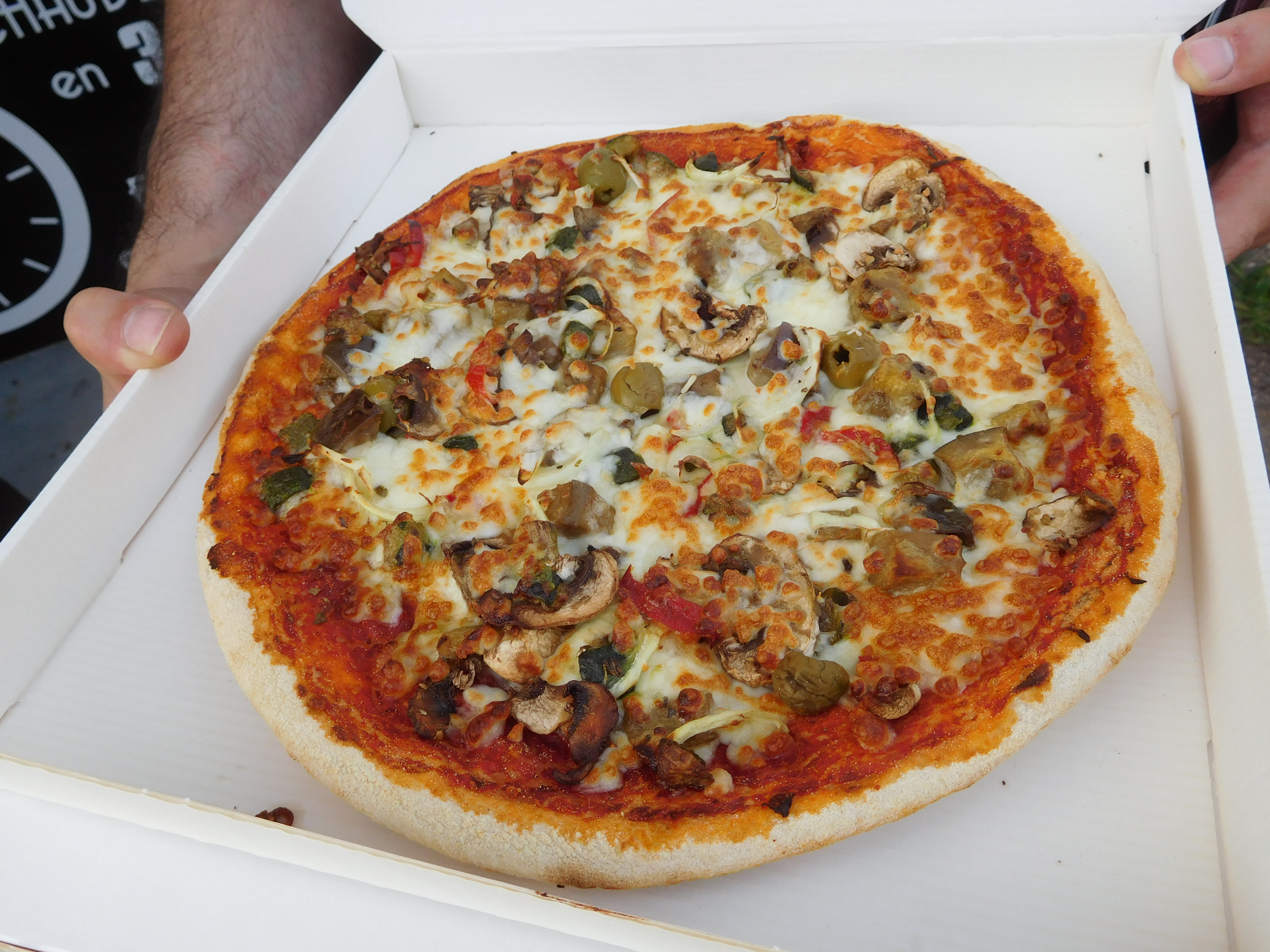
Clockwise from top left: fish and chips in England; döner kebab in the Czech Republic; pizza in France.

A take-out (US, Canada, Philippines) or takeaway (UK, Ireland, Commonwealth) is a prepared meal or other food items purchased at a restaurant or fast food outlet with the intent to eat elsewhere. A concept found in many ancient cultures, take-out food is common worldwide, with a number of different cuisines and dishes on offer.

== History ==
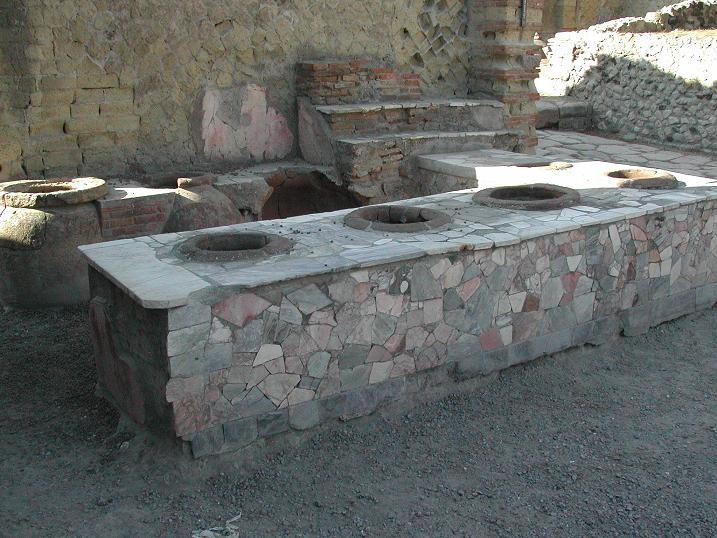
Thermopolium in Herculaneum

The concept of prepared meals to be eaten elsewhere dates back to antiquity. Market and roadside stalls selling food were common in Ancient Greece and Rome. Many people relied on them for their daily food. In Pompeii, archaeologists have found a number of thermopolia, service counters opening onto the street which provided food to be taken away. There is a distinct lack of formal dining and kitchen area in Pompeian homes, which may suggest that eating, or at least cooking, at home was unusual. Over 200 thermopolia have been found in the ruins of Pompeii.

In the cities of medieval Europe, a number of street vendors sold take-out food. In medieval London, street vendors sold hot meat pies, geese, sheep's feet and French wine, while in Paris roasted meats, squab, tarts and flans, cheeses and eggs were available. A large strata of society would have purchased food from these vendors, but they were especially popular amongst the urban poor, who would have lacked kitchen facilities in which to prepare their own food. However, these vendors often had a bad reputation, often being in trouble with city authorities reprimanding them for selling infected meat or reheated food. The cooks of Norwich often defended themselves in court against selling such things as "pokky pies" and "stynkyng mackerelles". In 10th and 11th century China, citizens of cities such as Kaifeng and Hangzhou were able to buy pastries such as yuebing and congyoubing to take away. By the early 13th century, the two most successful such shops in Kaifeng had "upwards of fifty ovens". A traveling Florentine reported in the late 14th century that in Cairo, people carried picnic cloths made of rawhide to spread on the streets and eat their meals of lamb kebabs, rice and fritters that they had purchased from street vendors. In Renaissance Turkey, many crossroads saw vendors selling "fragrant bites of hot meat", including chicken and lamb that had been spit roasted.

Aztec marketplaces had vendors that sold beverages such as atole ("a gruel made from maize dough"), almost 50 types of tamales (with ingredients that ranged from the meat of turkey, rabbit, gopher, frog, and fish, fruit, eggs, and maize flowers), as well as insects and stews. After Spanish colonization of Peru and importation of European food stocks including wheat, sugarcane and livestock, most commoners continued primarily to eat their traditional diets, but did add grilled beef hearts sold by street vendors. Some of Lima's 19th century street vendors such as "Erasmo, the 'negro' sango vendor" and Na Aguedita are still remembered today.

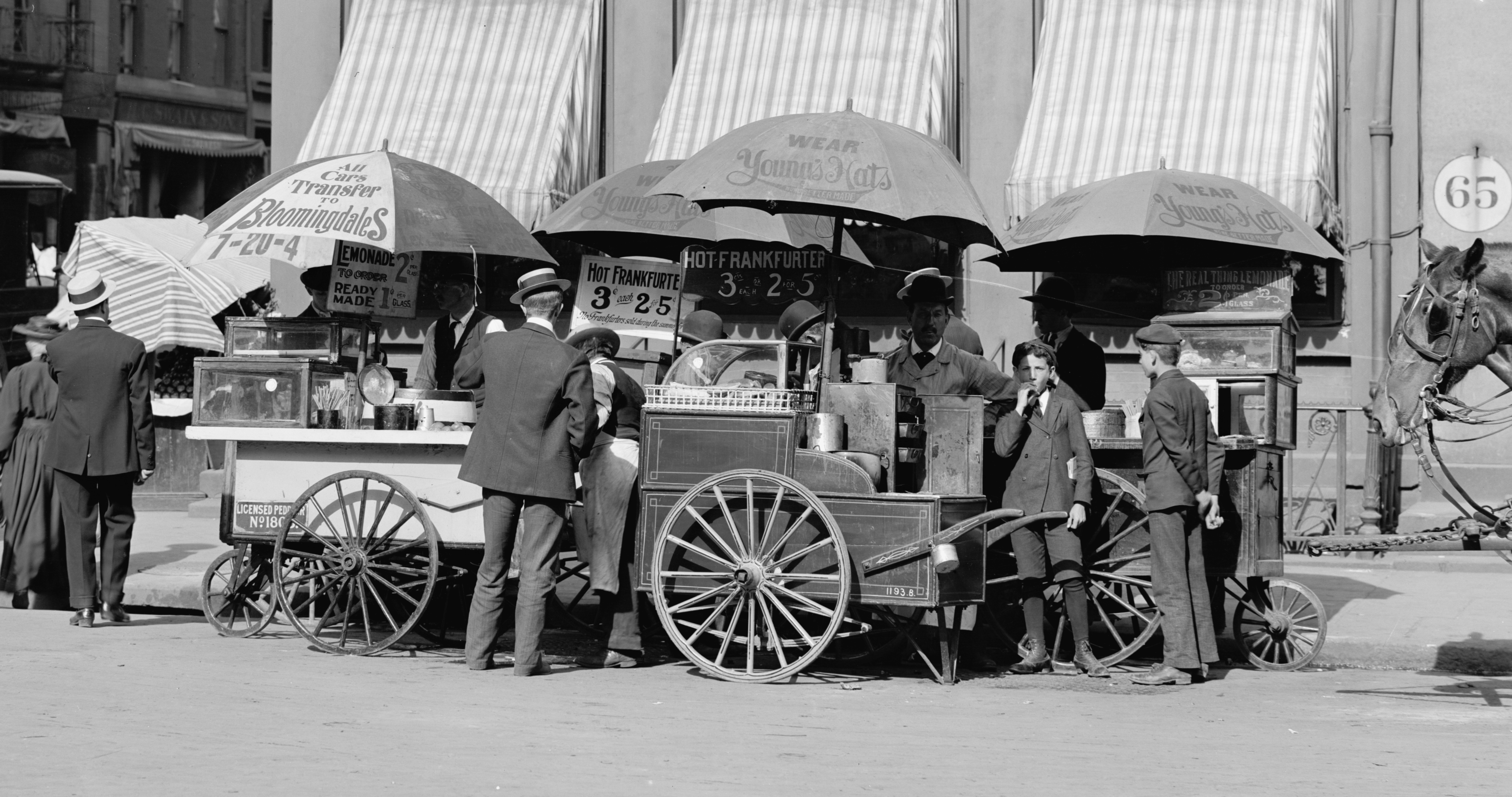
Street food vendors in early 20th century New York City

During the American colonial period, street vendors sold "pepper pot soup" (tripe) "oysters, roasted corn ears, fruit and sweets", with oysters being a low-priced commodity until the 1910s when overfishing caused prices to rise. In 1707, after previous restrictions that had limited their operating hours, street food vendors had been banned in New York City. Many women of African descent made their living selling street foods in America in the 18th and 19th centuries; with products ranging from fruit, cakes and nuts in Savannah, Georgia, to coffee, biscuits, pralines and other sweets in New Orleans. In the 19th century, street food vendors in Transylvania sold gingerbread-nuts, cream mixed with corn, and bacon and other meat fried on tops of ceramic vessels with hot coals inside.

The Industrial Revolution saw an increase in the availability of take-out food. Thanks to trawl fishing and shipment of fresh fish nation-wide by railroad, by the early 20th century, fish and chips was considered an "established institution" in Britain. The hamburger was introduced to America around this time. The diets of industrial workers were often poor, and these meals provided an "important component" to their nutrition. In India, local businesses and cooperatives, had begun to supply workers in the city of Mumbai (Bombay) with tiffin boxes by the end of the 19th century.

The COVID-19 pandemic led to many restaurants closing their indoor dining spaces and only offering take-out.

== Business operation ==
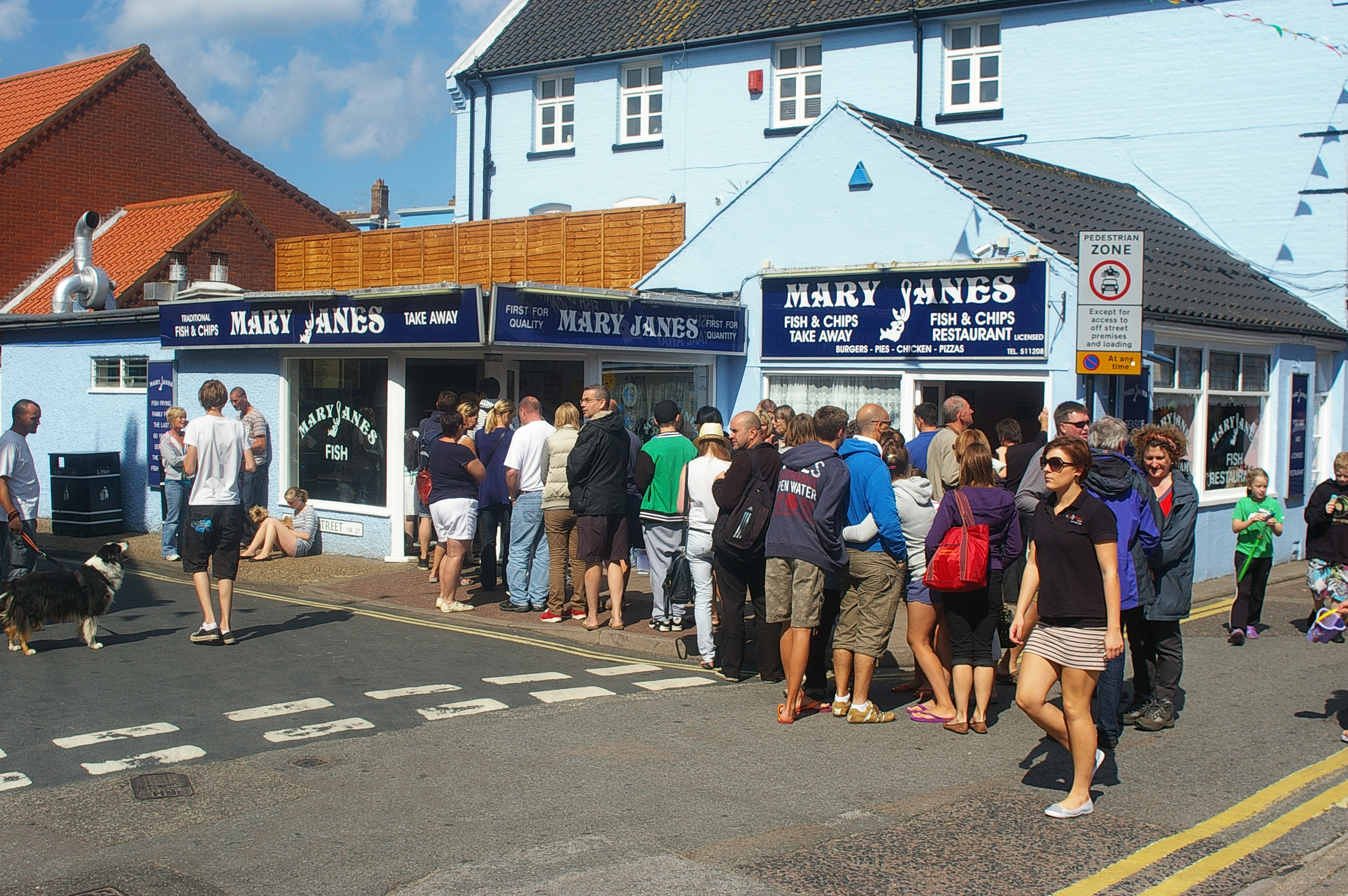
Customers queueing for takeaway at a fish and chip shop in England

Take-out food can be purchased from restaurants that also provide sit-down table service or from establishments specialising in food to be taken away. Providing a take-out service saves operators the cost of cutlery, crockery and pay for servers and hosts; it also allows many customers to be served quickly, without restricting sales by remaining to eat their food.

=== Street food ===
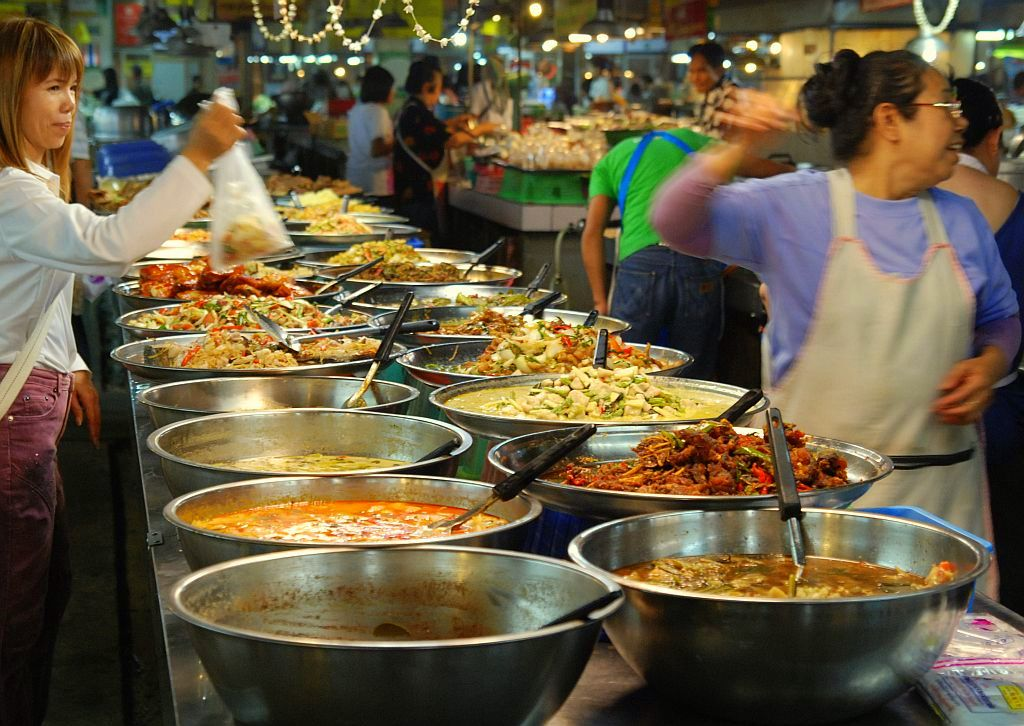
A market stall in Thailand selling take-out food

Although once popular in Europe and America, street food declined in popularity in the 20th century. In part, this can be attributed to a combination of the proliferation of specialized takeaway restaurants and legislation relating to health and safety. Vendors selling street food are still common in parts of Asia, Africa and the Middle East, with the annual turnover of street food vendors in Bangladesh and Thailand being described as particularly important to the local economy.

=== Drive-through ===
In the United States, many restaurants and take-out establishments offer drive-through or drive-thru outlets that allow customers to order, pay for, and receive food without leaving their cars. The idea was pioneered in 1931 in a California fast food restaurant, Pig Stand Number 21. By 1988, 51% of McDonald's turnover was being generated by drive-throughs, with 31% of all US take-out turnover being generated by them by 1990.

=== Food delivery ===
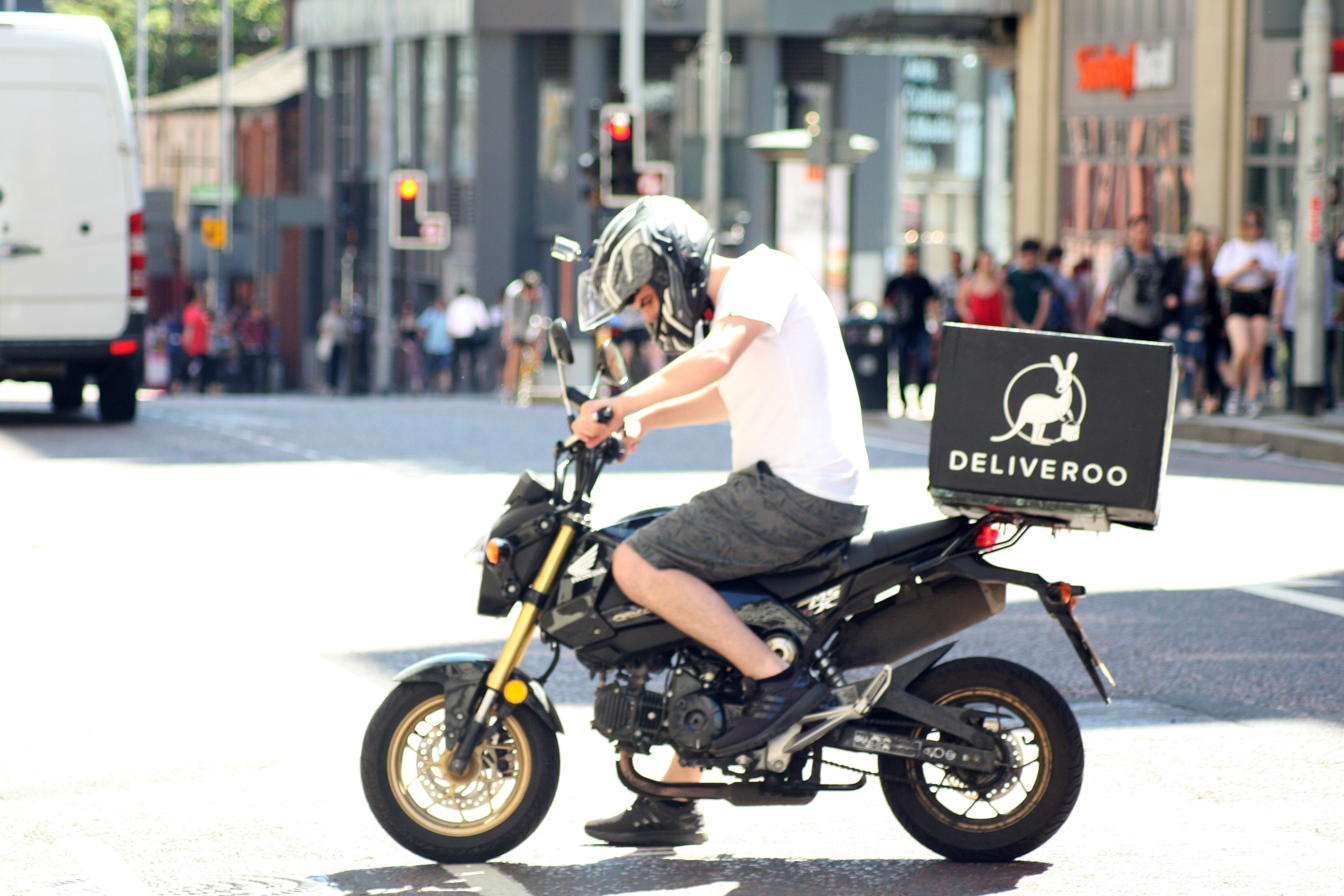
Deliveroo driver in Manchester, UK

Some take-out businesses offer prepared food for delivery, which usually involves contacting a local restaurant by telephone or online. The industry has kept pace with technological developments since the 1980s, beginning with the rise of the personal computer and continuing with the rise of mobile devices and online delivery applications. Specialized computer software for food delivery helps determine the most efficient routes for carriers, track order and delivery times, manage calls and orders with PoS software, and other functions. Since 2008 satellite navigation tracking technology has been used for real-time monitoring of delivery vehicles by customers over the Internet.

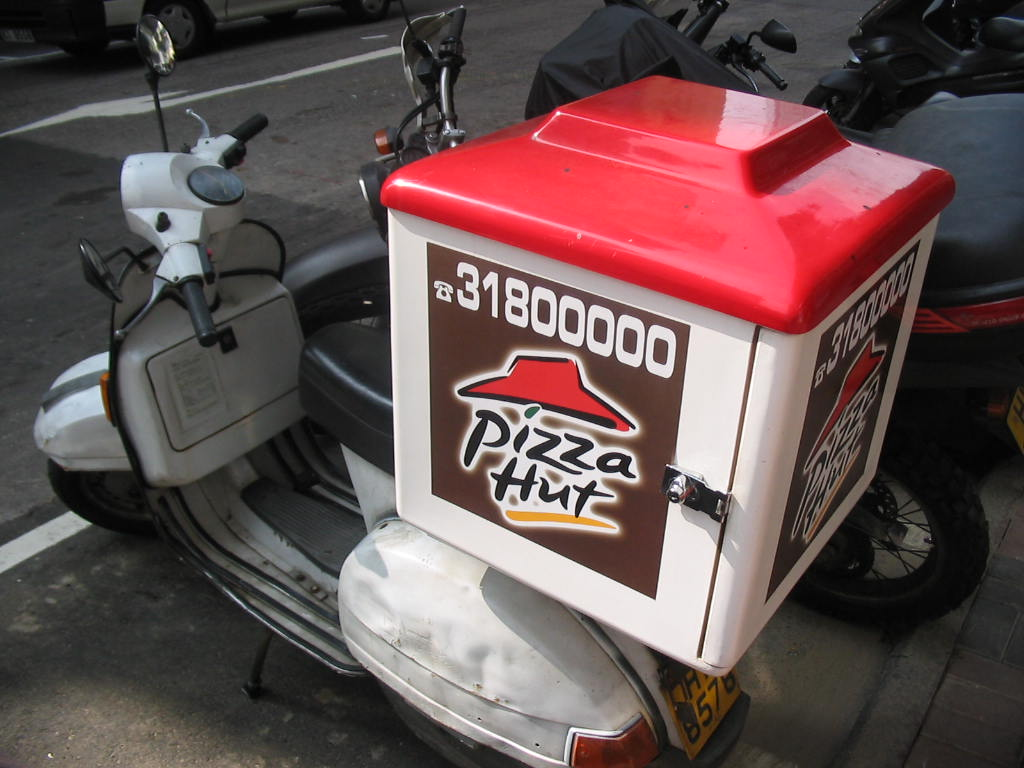
A branded scooter used for Pizza Hut pizza delivery in Hong Kong.

A restaurant can either maintain its own delivery personnel or use third parties who contract with restaurants to not only deliver food orders but also assist in marketing and providing order-taking technology. The field has seen rapid growth since the late 2000s with the spread of the smart phones and apps enabling customers to order from their mobile devices. In 2024 it was reported, that food delivery companies in the United States and Europe had amassed more than $20bn in combined operating losses. The shares of Deliveroo, Just Eat Takeaway, Delivery Hero, and DoorDash were therefore trading below the value that was delivered during the COVID-19 pandemic.

Some businesses offer a guarantee to deliver within a predetermined period of time, with late deliveries not charged for. For example, Domino's Pizza had a commercial campaign in the 1980s and early 1990s for its pizza delivery service which promised "30 minutes or it's free". This was discontinued in the United States in 1993 due to the number of lawsuits arising from accidents caused by hurried delivery drivers.

== Packaging ==
Take-out food is packaged in paper, paperboard, corrugated fiberboard, plastic, or foam food containers. One common container is the oyster pail, a folded, waxed or plastic coated, paperboard container. The oyster pail was quickly adopted, especially in the West, for "Chinese takeout".

In Britain, old newspapers were traditionally used for wrapping fish and chips until this was banned for health reasons in the 1980s. Many people are nostalgic for this traditional wrapping; some modern fish and chip shops wrap their food in faux-newspaper, food-safe paper printed to look like a newspaper.

Corrugated fiberboard and foam containers are to some extent self-insulating, and can be used for other foods. Thermal bags and other insulated shipping containers keep food hot (or cold) more effectively for longer.

Aluminium containers are also popular for take-out packaging due to their low cost. Expanded polystyrene is often used for hot drinks containers and food trays because it is lightweight and heat-insulating.

All types of container can be produced with supplier information and design to create a brand identity.

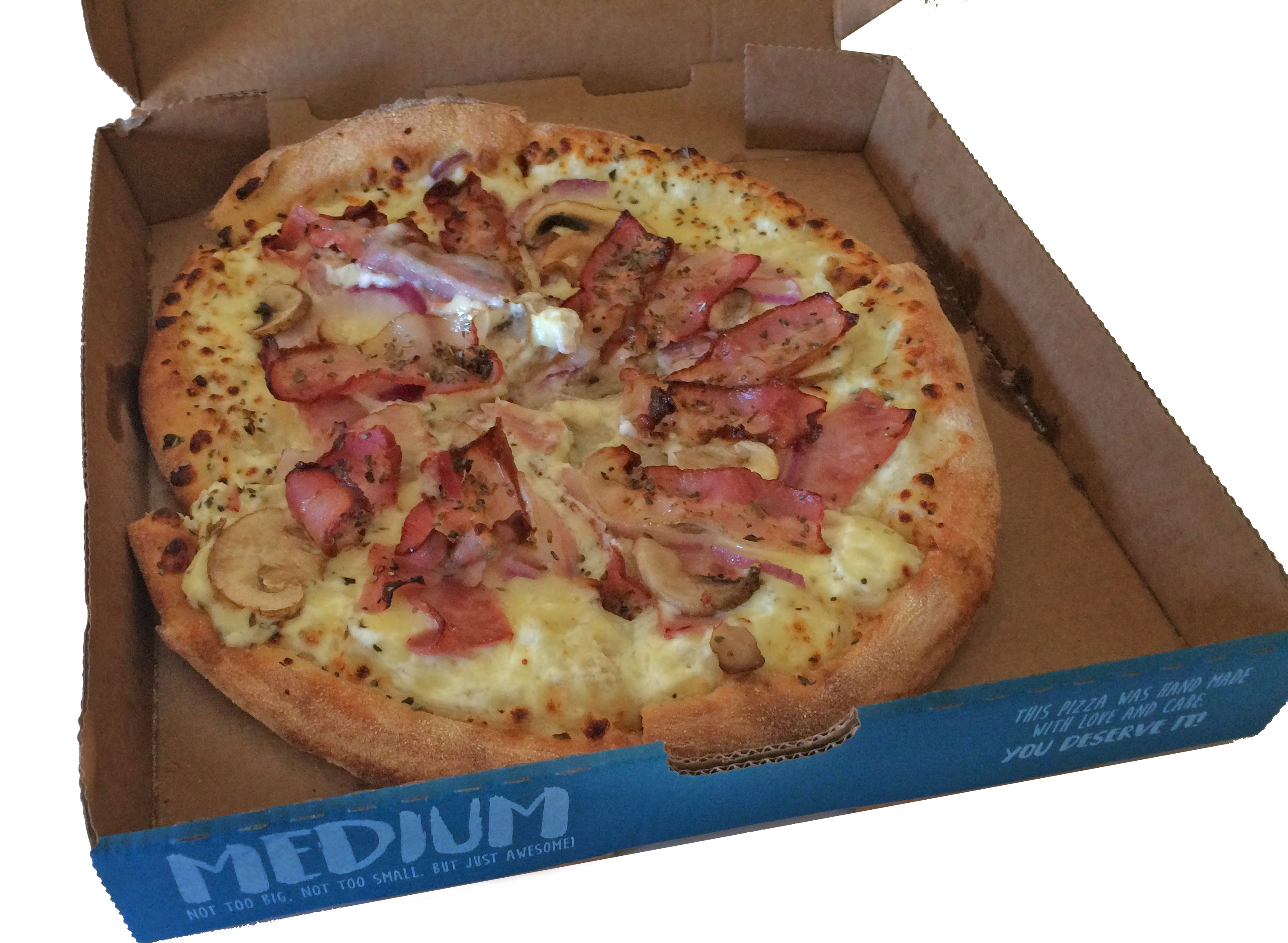
Pizza served in a cardboard box.

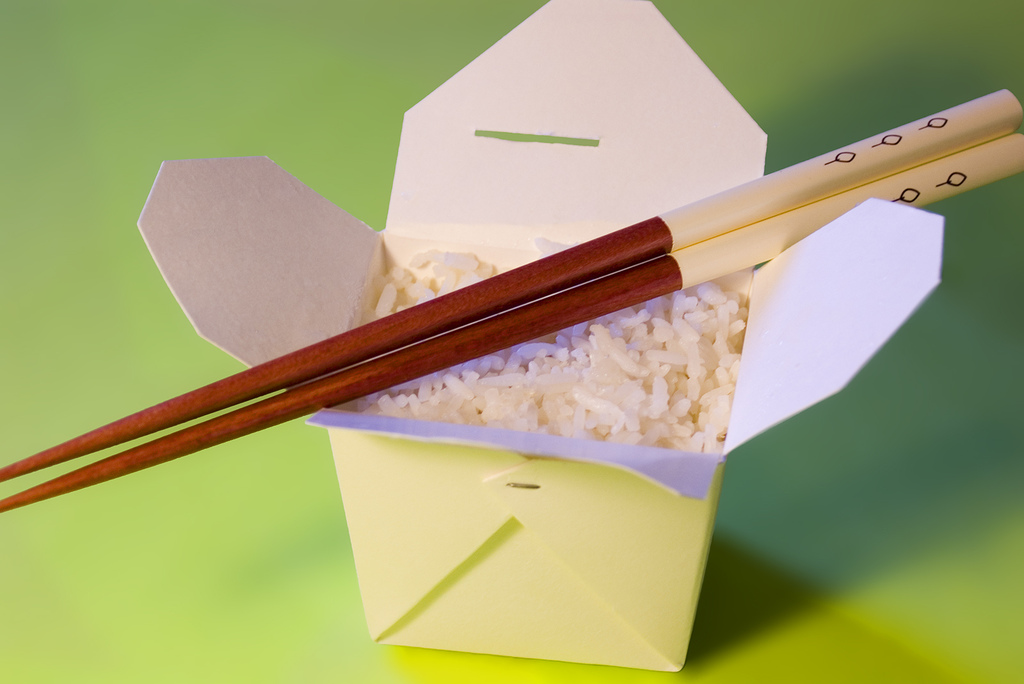
Boiled rice served in an oyster pail.

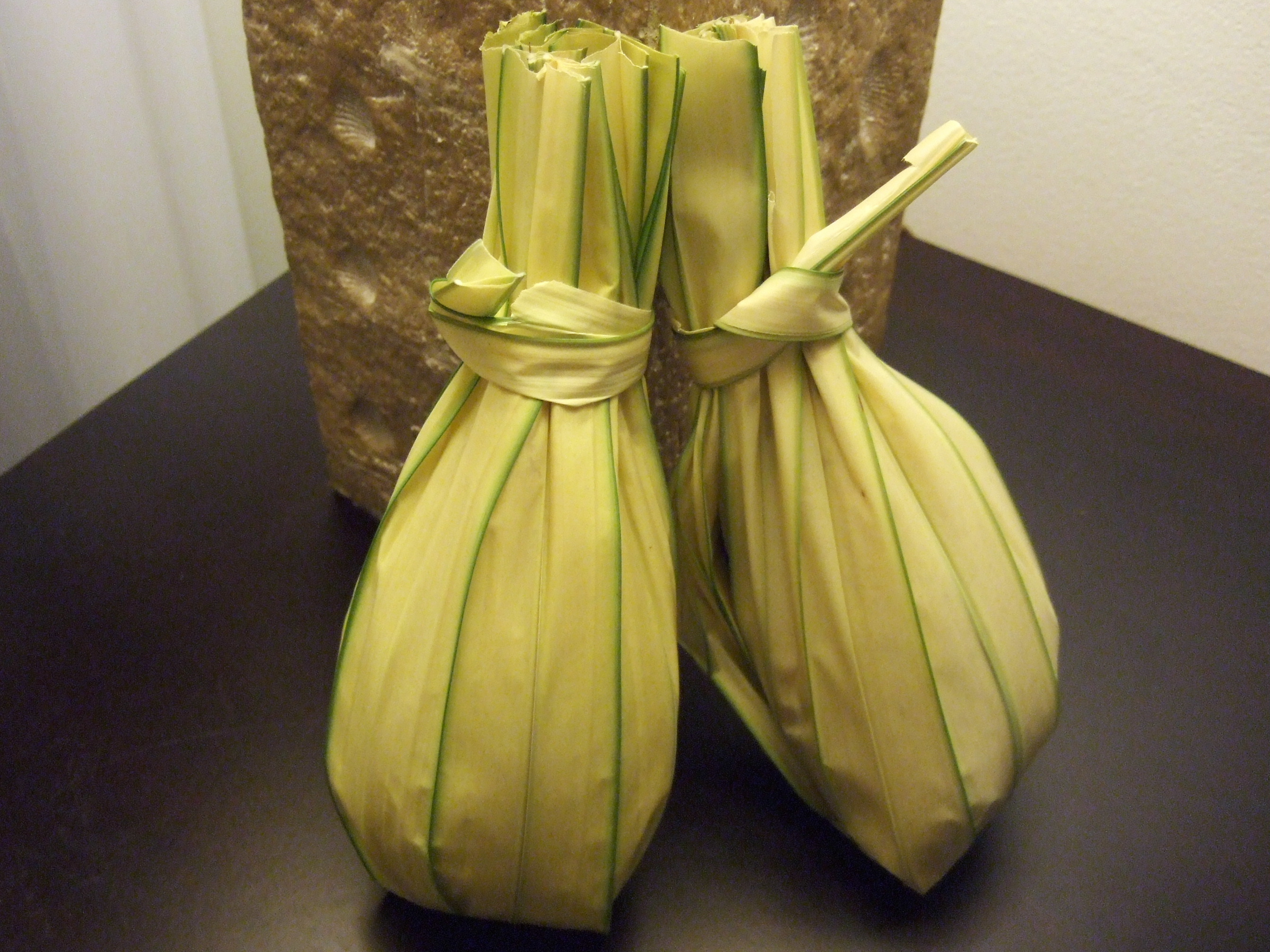
Leaf-wrapped rice dish (nasi kuning)

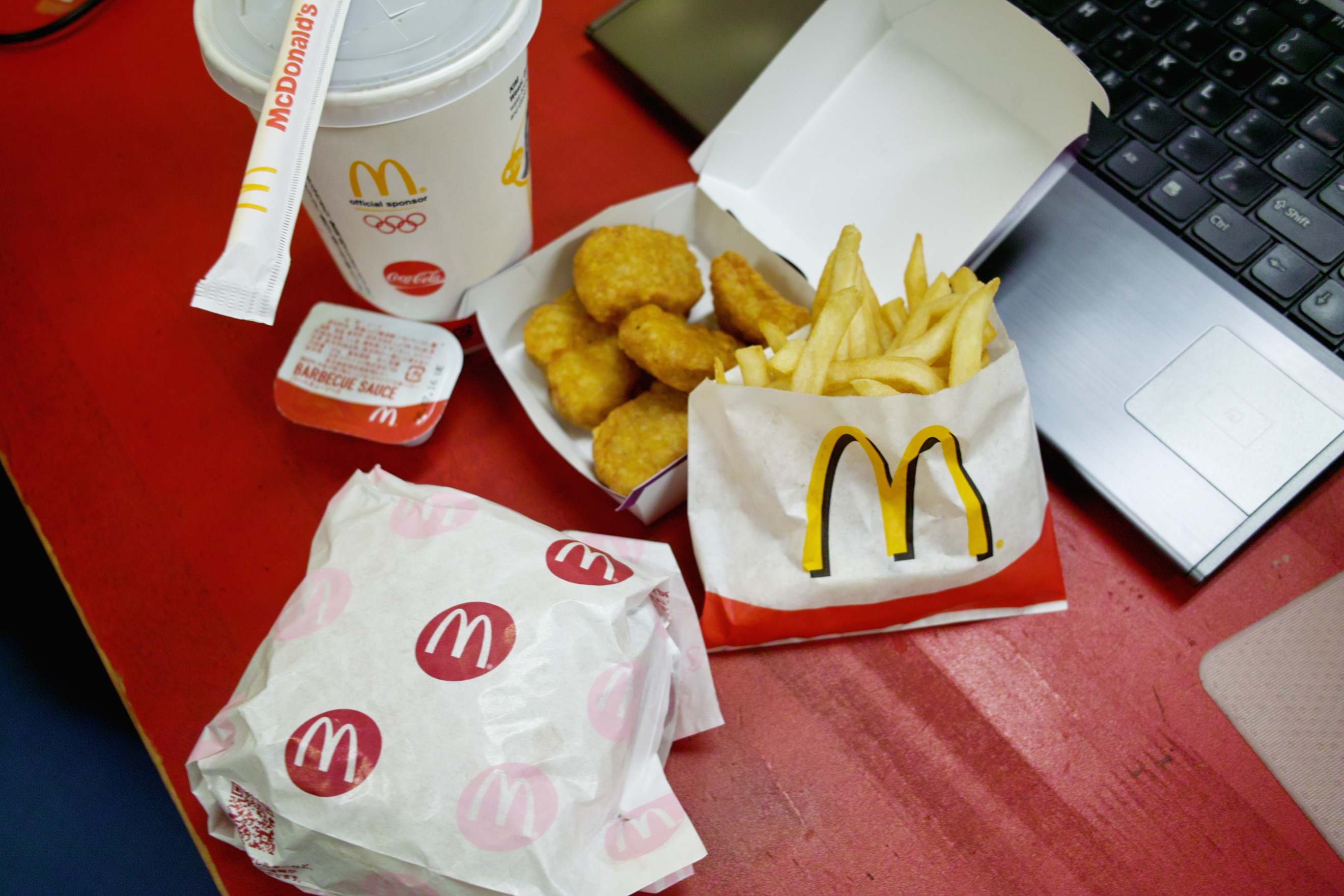
Paper-wrapped food carrying McDonald's food; including Chicken McNuggets, fries, McDouble, and a drink

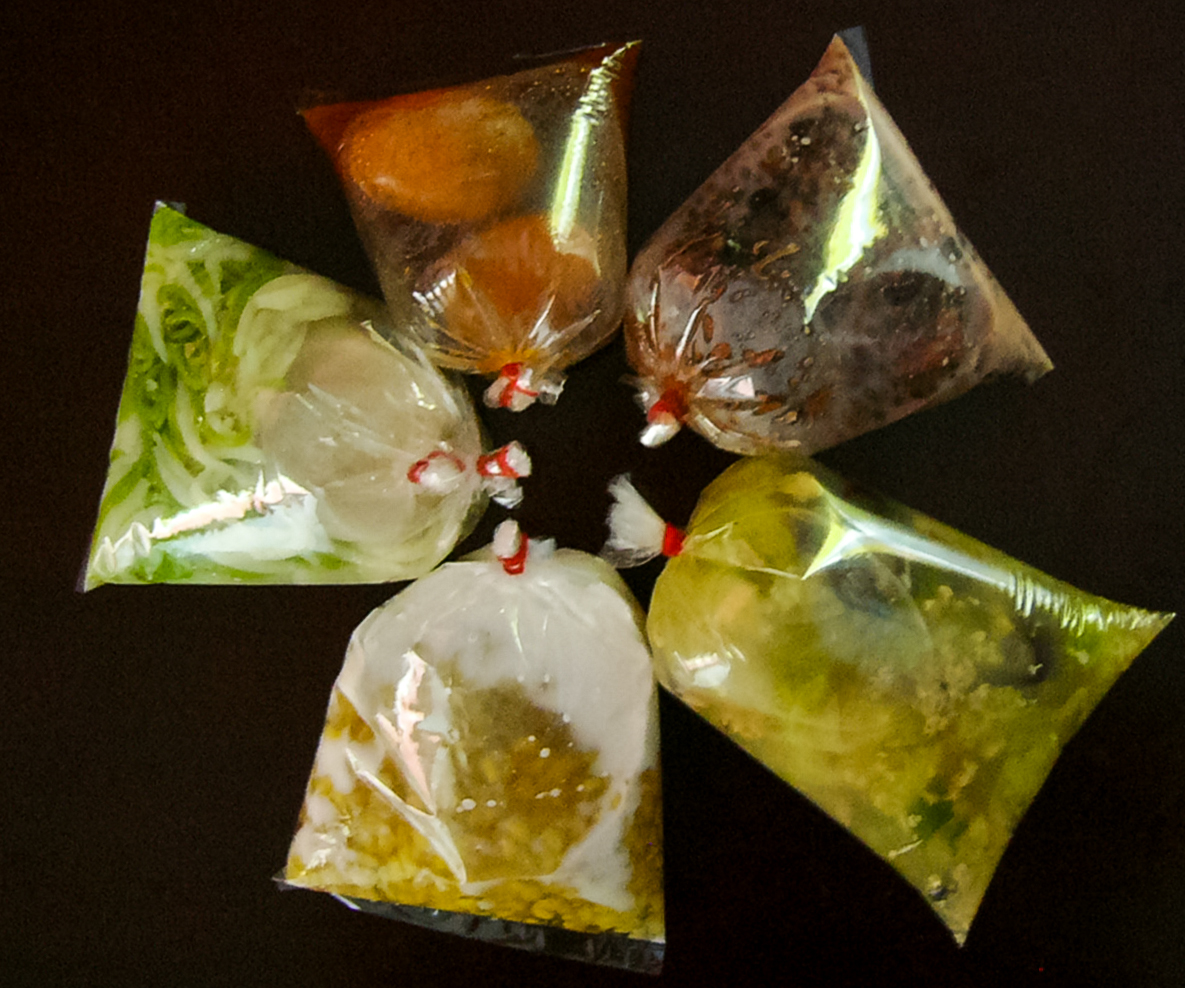
Take-out food in Thailand is often packaged in plastic bags

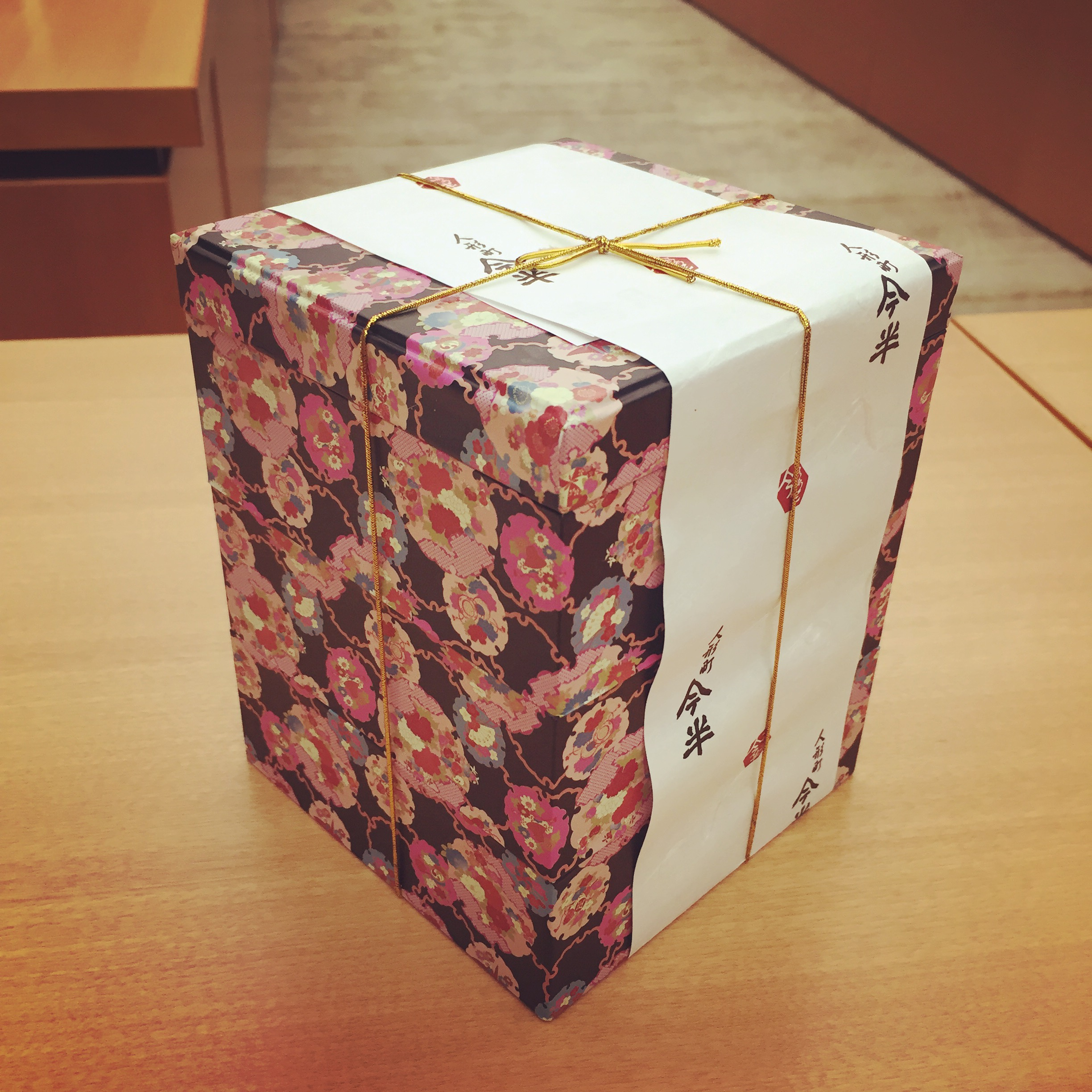
Orizume bento

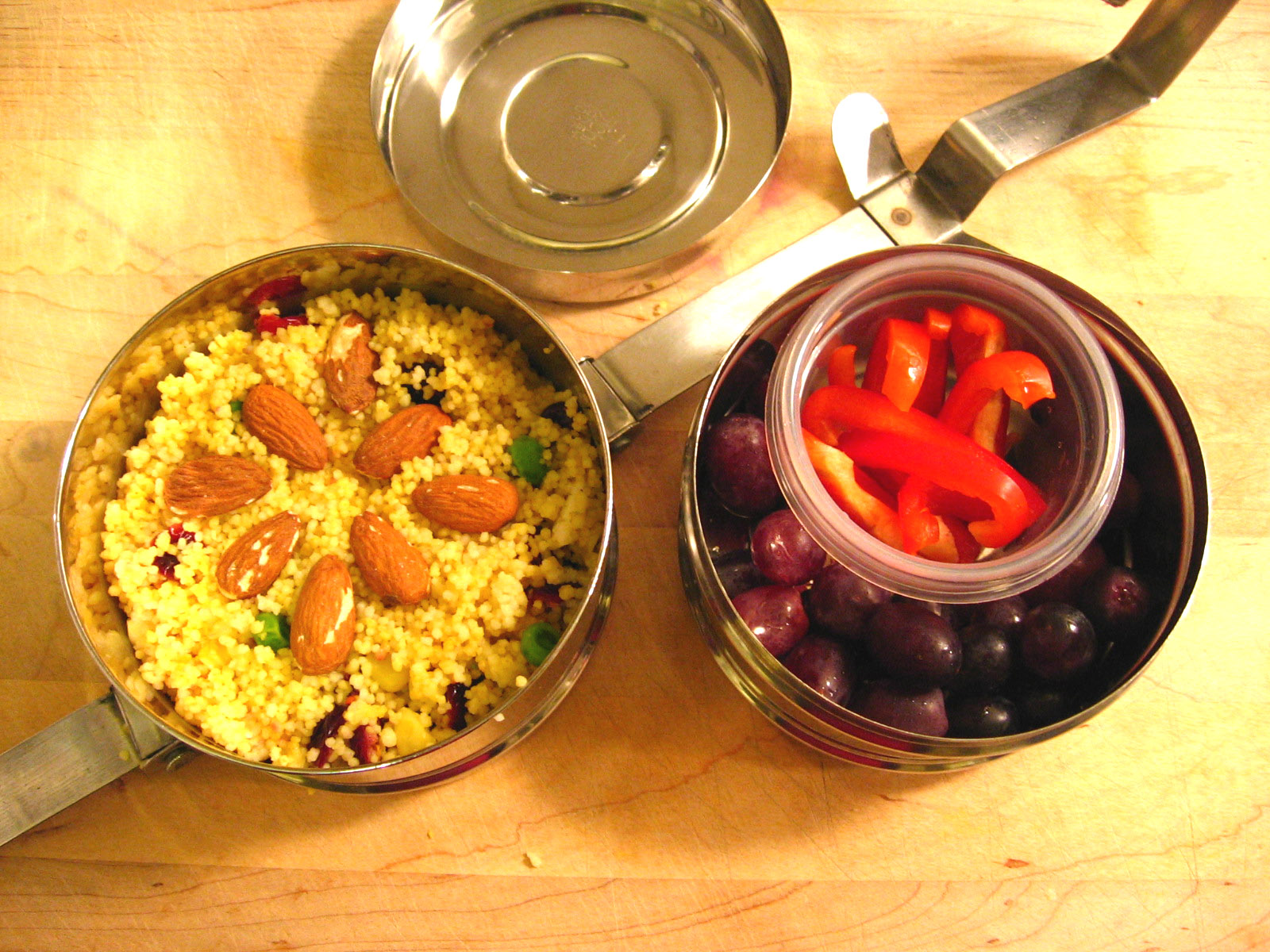
Tiffin carrier or dabba

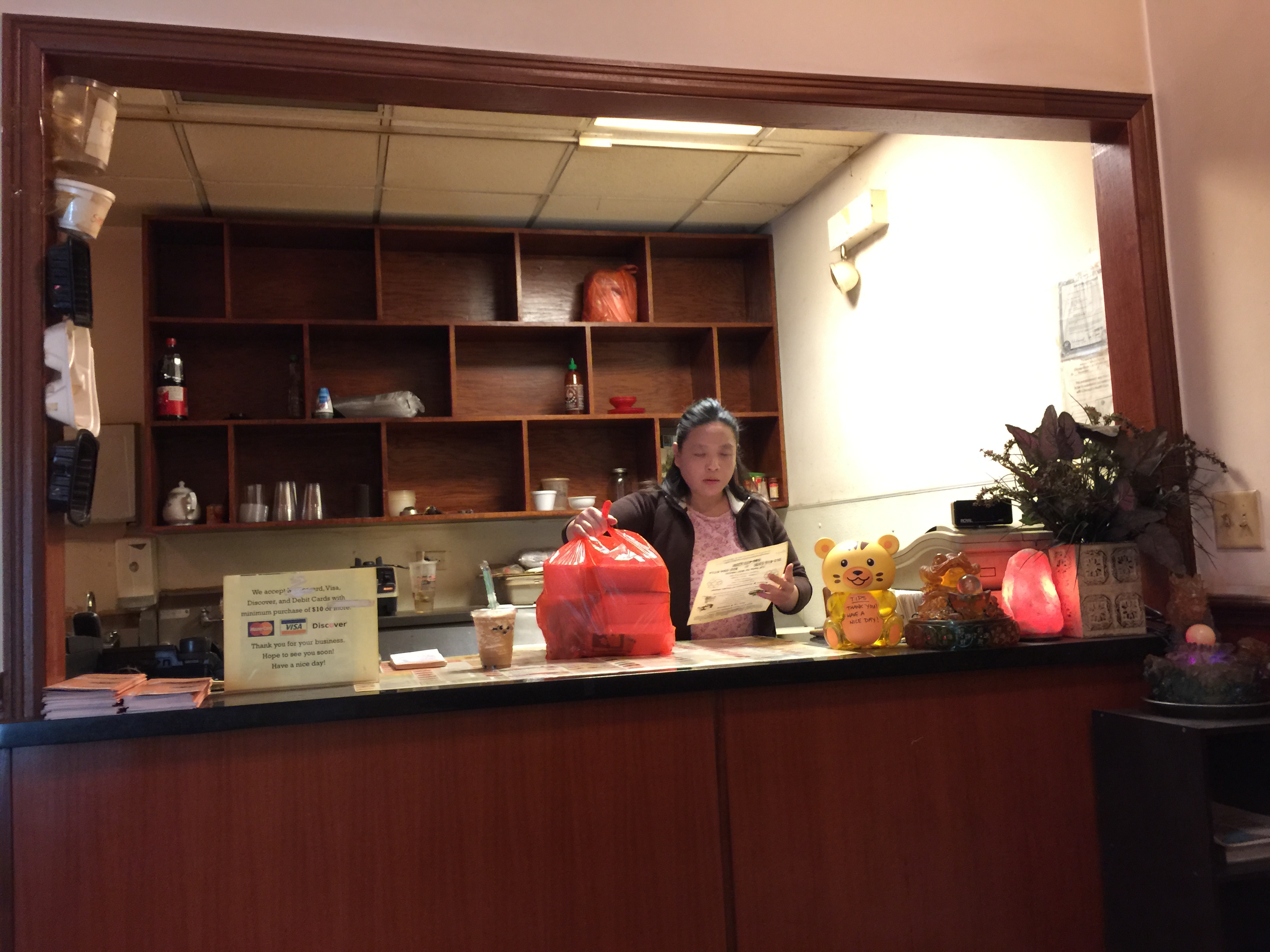
Chinese restaurant counter in a Northside Chicago neighborhood

== Disposable serviceware waste ==
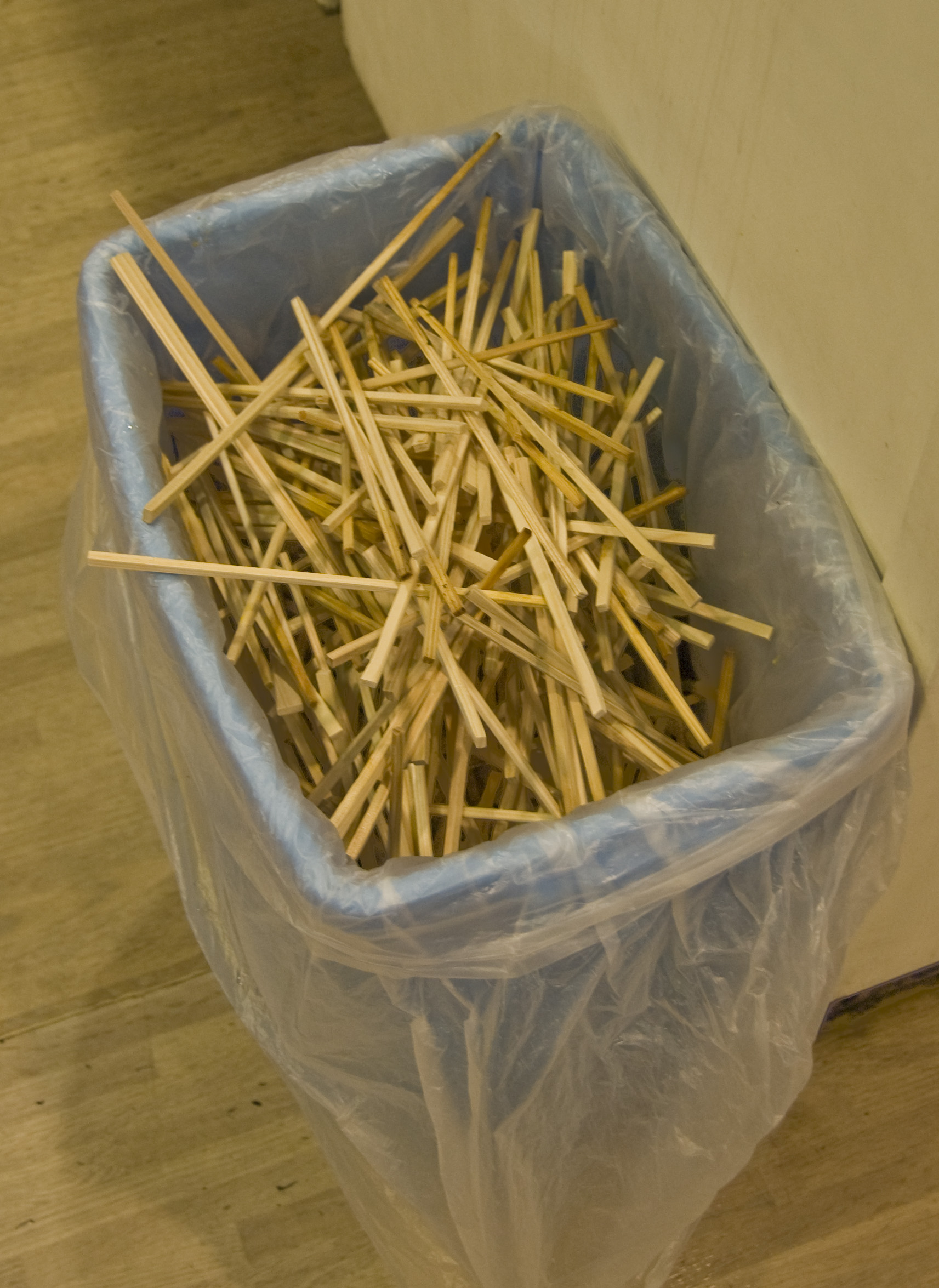
Disposable chopsticks in a university cafeteria trash bin in Japan

Packaging of fast food and take-out food is necessary for the customer but involves a significant amount of material that ends up in landfills, recycling, composting, or litter. Foam containers for fast-food were the target of environmentalists in the U.S. and were largely replaced with paper wrappers among large restaurant chains.

In 2002, Taiwan began taking action to reduce the use of disposable tableware at institutions and businesses, and to reduce the use of plastic bags. Yearly, the nation of 17.7 million people was producing 59,000 tons of disposable tableware waste and 105,000 tons of waste plastic bags, and increasing measures have been taken in the years since then to reduce the amount of waste. In 2013, Taiwan's Environmental Protection Administration (EPA) banned outright the use of disposable tableware in the nation's 968 schools, government agencies, and hospitals. The ban was expected to eliminate 2,600 metric tons of waste yearly.

In Germany, Austria, and Switzerland, laws banning the use of disposable food and drink containers at large-scale events have been enacted. Such a ban has been in place in Munich, Germany since 1991, applying to all city facilities and events. This includes events of all sizes, including very large ones (Christmas market, Auer-Dult Faire, Oktoberfest and Munich City Marathon). For small events of a few hundred people, the city has arranged for a corporation to offer rental of crockery and dishwasher equipment. In part through this regulation, Munich reduced the waste generated by Oktoberfest, which attracts millions of people, from 11,000 metric tons in 1990 to 550 tons in 1999.

China, by virtue of the size of its population and the surging popularity of food delivery apps, such as Meituan and Ele.me, faces significant challenges disposing of or recycling takeout food packaging waste. According to a 2018 study published in Resources, Conservation and Recycling, for the first half of 2017, Chinese consumers ordered 4.6 billion takeout meals, generating "significant environmental concerns". The study's authors estimated that packaging waste from food delivery grew from 20,000 metric tons in 2015 to 1.5 million metric tons in 2017. In 2018, Meituan reported making over 6.4 billion food deliveries, up from 4 billion a year earlier.

Because takeout and delivery meals in China include single-use chopsticks, which are made from wood or bamboo, the growth in food delivery also has an impact on China's forests. China produces about 80 billion pairs of single-use chopsticks yearly, the equivalent of 20 million 20-year-old trees. About 45 percent are made from trees – mainly cottonwood, birch, and spruce, the remainder being made from bamboo. Japan uses about 24 billion pairs of these disposables per year, and globally about 80 billion pairs are thrown away by an estimated 1.4 billion people. In 2013 in Japan, one pair of disposable chopsticks cost US$0.02. One pair of reusable chopsticks cost $1.17, and each pair could be used 130 times. A cost of $1.17 per pair divided by 130 uses comes to $0.009 (0.9¢) per use, less than half the cost of disposable. Campaigns in several countries to reduce this waste are beginning to have some effect.

== See also ==
- Condiment sachet
- Leftovers
- Oyster pail, a type of paper container from America that later became used with Chinese American cuisine
- Pizza delivery
- Street food
