= Special Sauce =

Special sauce (or Special Sauce) may refer to:

- Special sauce, the condiment used in the Big Mac, a hamburger sandwich at McDonald's restaurants
- G. Love & Special Sauce, a rock band
