= Chicken Legend =

Chicken burger sold by McDonald's

Nutritional value per
- Energy: 18 kcal (75 kJ)
- Carbohydrates: 2.1 g (0.7%)
- Dietary fiber: 1.1 g (4%)
- Fat: 0.5 g (0.6%)
- Other constituents: Quantity
- Salt equivalent: 0.05g
- Values may be different outside UK market.
- ^{†}Percentages estimated using US recommendations for adults.

The Chicken Legend was a brand of chicken burger sold by McDonald's in the United Kingdom that was sold between 2007 and 2022. The burger was replaced on 19 October 2022 with the McCrispy, 15 years after its release.

The burger featured a ciabatta roll, fried chicken breast and lettuce. There was also an option for either Mayonnaise, barbecue, or spicy tomato sauce.
