= Bonus Jack =

Hamburger on menu of Jack in the Box

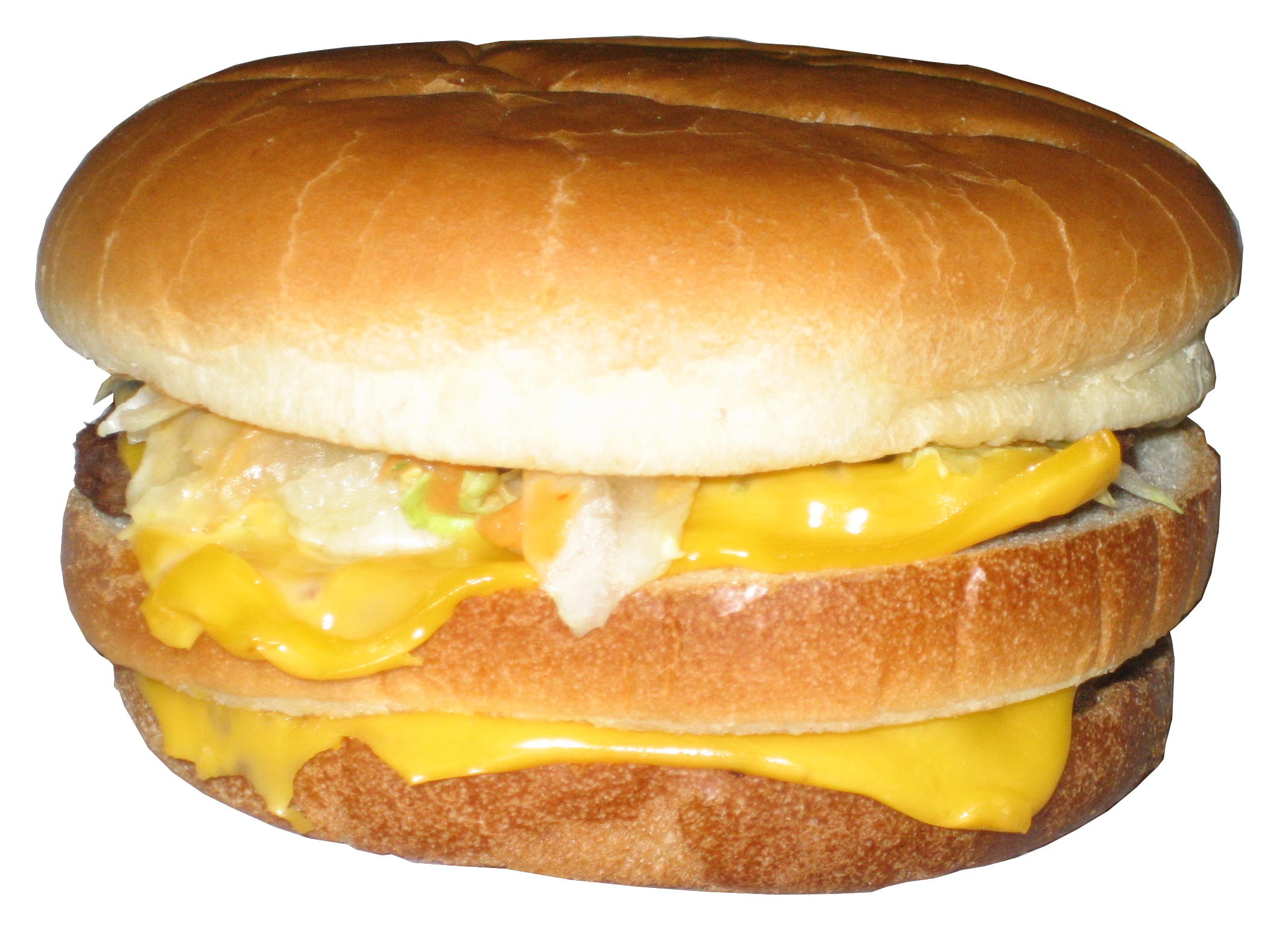
- Bonus Jack

Nutritional value per 1 sandwich
- Energy: 2,260 kJ (540 kcal)
- Carbohydrates: 34 (g)
- Sugars: 6 (g)
- Dietary fiber: 1 (g)
- Fat: 33 (g)
- Saturated: 13 (g)
- Trans: 1 (g)
- Protein: 25 (g)
Vitamins and minerals
Minerals	Quantity %DV^{†}
Potassium	12% 374 mg
Sodium	46% 1062 mg
- Other constituents: Quantity
- Calories from fat: 297
- Cholesterol: 88 (mg)

The Bonus Jack is a hamburger sold by the fast-food restaurant chain Jack in the Box. It was one of the company's signature products. The Bonus Jack was first offered in 1970 to compete with McDonald's Big Mac and was discontinued in the early 1980s. The Bonus Jack has been reintroduced to Jack in the Box menus at various times throughout the years.

== Product description ==
Similar to the Big Mac, the Bonus Jack consists of two burger patties, two slices of American cheese, Jack's Secret Sauce, shredded lettuce, and two pickle slices on a three-piece bun.

== See also ==
- List of sandwiches
