= Kowsari =

Kowsari or Kosari (Arabic: کوثری; Persian: کوثری) is a surname.

Notable people with the surname include:

- Baran Kosari (born 1985), Iranian actress
- Esmaeil Kousari (born 1955), Iranian military officer and politician
- Khider Kosari (Khider Mohammad Rasheed, 1969–1993), Kurdish Islamist rebel and poet

== See also ==
- Kowsar (disambiguation)
