= Kotharia =

Kotharia may refer to the following places in India:

- Kotharia, Rajasthan, a town in Rajsamand district of Rajasthan, and headquarters of the former jagir of the House of Kotharia
- Kotharia, Rajkot, a town in Rajkot district of Gujarat, and former princely state

== See also ==
- Kothari (disambiguation)
