= Big Mac =

Hamburger sold by McDonald's

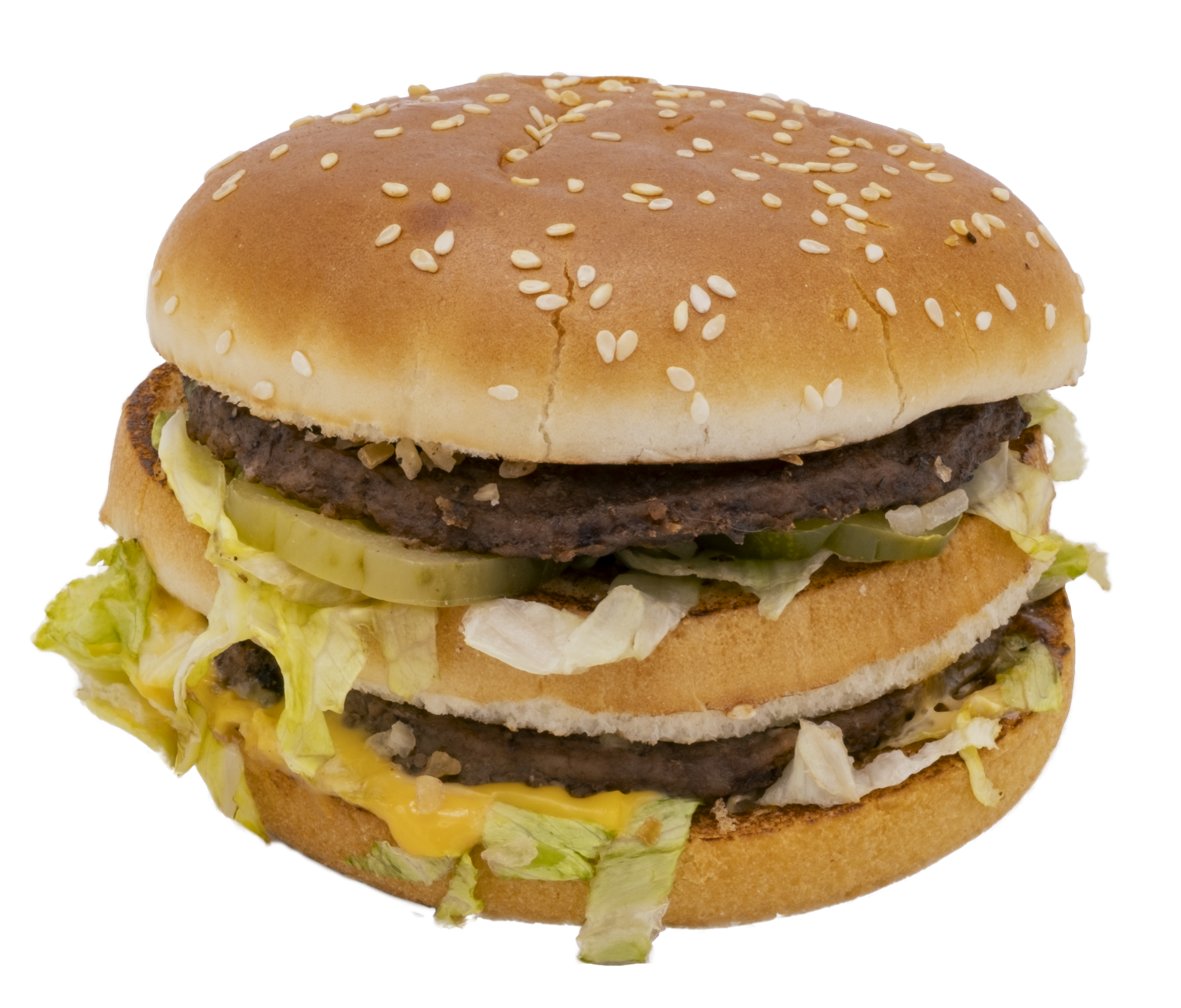

Nutritional value per 1 sandwich 7.6 oz (220 g)
- Energy: 580 kcal (2,400 kJ)
- Carbohydrates: 45 g (16%)
- Sugars: 7 g
- Dietary fiber: 3 g (10%)
- Fat: 34 g (43%)
- Saturated: 11 g (56%)
- Trans: 1 g
- Protein: 25 g
Vitamins and minerals
Minerals	Quantity %DV^{†}
Calcium	9% 120 mg
Iron	22% 4 mg
Potassium	12% 370 mg
Sodium	46% 1060 mg
- Other constituents: Quantity
- Salt equivalent: 2,650 mg
- Energy from fat: 306 kcal (1,280 kJ)
- Cholesterol: 85 mg (28%)
- Values may be different outside US market.
- ^{†}Percentages estimated using US recommendations for adults, except for potassium, which is estimated based on expert recommendation from the National Academies. Source: McDonald's US Product Nutrition

The Big Mac is a brand of hamburger sold by the international fast food restaurant chain McDonald's. It was introduced by a Greater Pittsburgh area franchisee in 1967 and expanded nationwide in 1968, and is regarded as McDonald's flagship product.

The Big Mac features a three-slice sesame-seed bun containing two beef patties, one slice of cheese, shredded lettuce, pickles, minced onions, and "special sauce" similar to Thousand Island dressing. Seasonal and regional variants have been offered, including chicken versions.

The Big Mac is known worldwide and often used as a symbol of American capitalism and decadence. The Economist has used it as a reference point for comparing the cost of living in different countries – the Big Mac Index – as it is so widely available and is comparable across markets.

== History ==
The Big Mac was created by Jim Delligatti, who stated later he did not invent the Big Mac but merely copied the double deck hamburger marketed by the Big Boy hamburger chain since the 1940s. Delligatti operated several McDonald's restaurants in the Pittsburgh area. It was created in the kitchen of Delligatti's first McDonald's franchise, located on McKnight Road in suburban Ross Township.

The Big Mac debuted at the McDonald's owned by Delligatti in Uniontown, Pennsylvania, on April 22, 1967, selling for US$0.45 (equivalent to $4.35 in 2025). It was designed to compete with Big Boy Restaurants' Big Boy hamburger. Eat'n Park was the Pittsburgh area's Big Boy franchisee at the time. The Big Mac proved popular and it was added to the menu of all U.S. McDonald's restaurants in 1968.

The Big Mac had two previous names, both of which failed in the marketplace: the Aristocrat and the Blue Ribbon Burger. The third name, Big Mac, was created by Esther Glickstein Rose, a 21-year-old advertising secretary who worked at McDonald's corporate headquarters in Oak Brook, Illinois.

== Product ==
The Big Mac is made with two 1.6 oz (45 g) beef patties, a "special sauce" (similar to Thousand Island dressing), shredded iceberg lettuce, one processed American cheese slice, two slices of dill pickle, and minced onions, served on a three slice sesame seed bun. In October 2014, McDonald's released a behind-the-scenes video as part of its "Our Food. Your Questions." transparency campaign, with former MythBusters co-host Grant Imahara touring a Cargill facility to explain how the company's U.S. beef patties are made. On October 1, 2018, McDonald's announced that it would remove all artificial preservatives, flavors, and coloring from the Big Mac.

=== Sauce ===
In the past, Big Mac Sauce was delivered to McDonald's restaurants in sealed canisters designed by Sealright, from which it was directly dispensed using a calibrated "sauce gun" that would dispense a specified amount with each pull of the trigger. In 2023, McDonald's introduced a new dispenser that uses soft bags of sauce and a plunger to compress the bag with a ratchet system. The new dispenser is also used for McChicken Sauce and tartare sauce.

In 2012, McDonald's executive chef Dan Coudreaut released a YouTube video revealing the recipe of the sauce. It consists of store-bought mayonnaise, sweet pickle relish and yellow mustard whisked together with vinegar, garlic powder, onion powder and paprika. In 2018, McDonald's removed potassium sorbate, sodium benzoate, and calcium disodium EDTA from the sauce.

The sauce is occasionally available for purchase for a limited time. The first time was in 2015. A 25 ml (0.85 U.S. fl oz) tube was available for purchase but only in restaurants in Australia. It was available again in 2020. A 50 ml (1.7 U.S. fl oz) pot was available for purchase but only in restaurants in the UK and Ireland. In 2023 and early 2024 it was available in Hungary. McDonald's Australia offers a "portion cup" of Big Mac Sauce as part of its regular menu.

=== Packaging ===
The Big Mac was first served inside a collapsible square cardboard container and held together with a circular piece of cardboard placed. The cardboard container was changed to a "clamshell"-style polystyrene foam container in the late 1970s. Polystyrene foam containers were phased out beginning in 1990, due to environmental concerns.

== Advertising ==
=== "Two all-beef patties" jingle ===
In 1974 McDonald's commissioned an advertising jingle which popularized the list of ingredients of the Big Mac: "Two all-beef patties, special sauce, lettuce, cheese, pickles, onions on a sesame-seed bun." In 2008 McDonald's restaurants in Malaysia revived the slogan. The revival included the original prize of a free Big Mac if the customer was able to recite the slogan in under four seconds. It was released in May, along with the promotional Mega Mac, which had four beef patties instead of two.

=== McDonaldland character ===
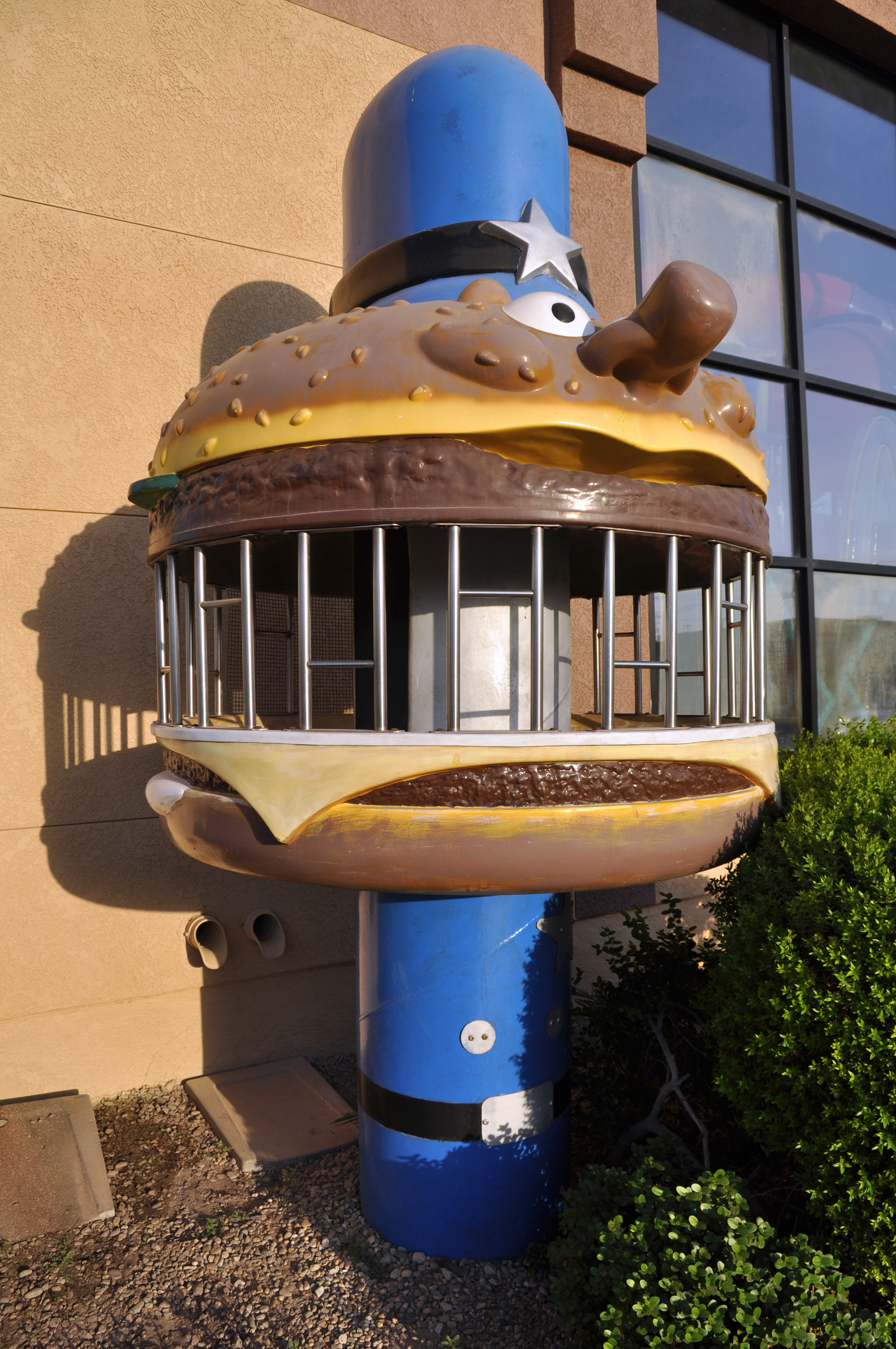
McDonald's playground Officer Big Mac climb-in jail

McDonald's began a television advertising campaign appealing to children in 1971 featuring a fantasy world populated by Ronald McDonald and various mascots promoting McDonald's products. Some characters were also modeled in McDonald's store playground equipment. The Big Mac was represented by Officer Big Mac, a Keystone Cops-style policeman with a giant Big Mac sandwich for a head. The characters were revised after a 1973 plagiarism lawsuit brought by television puppeteers Sid and Marty Krofft because of similarities to their H.R. Pufnstuf characters. A modified Officer Big Mac continued in the commercials until 1985.

=== Hip hop product placement ===
In 2005 McDonald's began offering product placement rewards to hip hop artists who mentioned the Big Mac in their music, giving US$5 to the artist for every time a song mentioning it was played on the radio.

=== EU trademark revocation ===
McDonald's sued the Irish fast-food chain Supermac's for trademark infringement and claimed the name would confuse consumers in European markets. On 11 January 2019, the European Union Intellectual Property Office (EUIPO) ruled in Supermac's favor in what has been called a "David vs. Goliath" victory. McDonald's submitted a copy of the Wikipedia article about the Big Mac as part of its evidence, but the court found the Wikipedia page was not acceptable as "independent evidence".

In 2023, the EUIPO Board of Appeal annulled the decision after McDonald's filed 700 pages of additional evidence, despite objections. Supermac's responded by bringing the case to the European Court of Justice, which finally ruled in 2024 that McDonald's had not proven use of the Big Mac trademark when it came to poultry products or operating restaurants. The ruling does not affect the trademark with respect to the Big Mac burger product.

== US sales ==
In 2007 Danya Proud, a McDonald's spokeswoman, said that in the United States alone 560 million Big Macs are sold each year. This would mean that approximately 17 Big Macs are sold every second.

== Variants ==
- The Mega Mac or Double Big Mac: four 1.6 oz (45 g) beef patties and an extra slice of cheese. Available in Australia, Canada, China, Egypt, Ireland, Japan, Malaysia, Taiwan (during promotional periods only), Turkey, Singapore, Pakistan, South Korea, Thailand, and United Kingdom. It was introduced to the United States in early 2020, but was discontinued shortly after McDonald's streamlined menus during the COVID-19 pandemic. The sandwich returned to the US market in January 2024. The Double Big Mac is the biggest regular hamburger the chain produces and it has 680 calories.
- Big Big Mac: a Quarter Pounder–like product sold in Europe (Finland, Belgium, Spain, Portugal, and Italy). Has been sold periodically in Sweden, there called "Grand Big Mac".
- The Denali Mac: made with two one-quarter-pound (110 g) patties. Named after Denali in Alaska, and sold only in that state.
- In India, where consuming beef is illegal in most states, the Big Mac is known as the Maharaja Mac and was originally made with lamb instead of beef; however, along with the company's other items, it is now made from chicken.
- The Mega Tamago Mac, a limited variant of the Big Mac, was launched in Japan, consisting of three patties, a fried egg, bacon, and cheese.
- The Chicken Big Mac is a Big Mac with two breaded chicken patties sold in US, UK, Canada, Pakistan, Egypt, UAE, Kuwait, Qatar and other countries as a limited-availability or promotional burger.
- The Giga Big Mac, is sold in Japan. It is a larger version of the Big Mac with three times the meat of a regular one.
- Little Mac or Mac Jr. is a reduction of the standard Big Mac which uses a two-piece bun and contains only one beef patty. It has been available as a limited-time promotion in the U.S. since 2017.
- Grand Mac uses larger patties, at 1/3 pound (150 g) combined. It became available in the U.S. beginning in 2017 and was first made available overseas in the UK, Ireland, and Australia as the "Grand Big Mac" in 2018 to celebrate the 50th anniversary of the original Big Mac. This and the Mac Jr. were collectively known as the "Big Mac range" in the UK.
- Big Mac BLT is a standard Big Mac burger with the addition of bacon and tomato. Released in Australia and New Zealand as a promotional item in late 2017.
- Big Mac Bacon was introduced in selected markets in 2018, as a limited-time option. It is essentially a Big Mac with added bacon. In 2019, this was extended in the UK to the Grand Big Mac and the Mac Jr.
- McDouble "Like a Mac". Some customers will order a McDouble where ketchup and mustard is replaced by Big Mac Sauce and shredded lettuce is added. The resulting sandwich is like a Big Mac without the middle bun and is often cheaper.
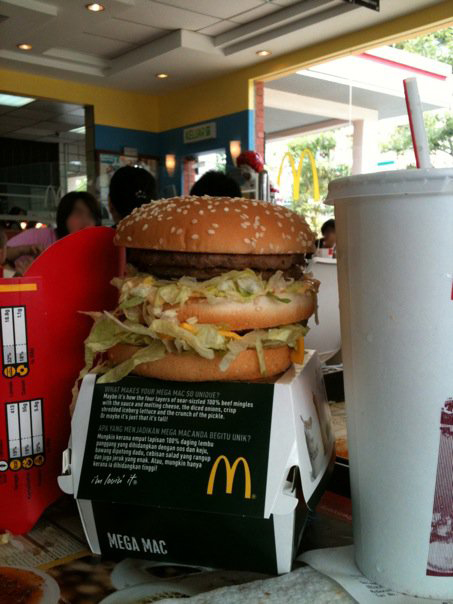
A Mega Mac burger with a large Coke and fries in Malaysia

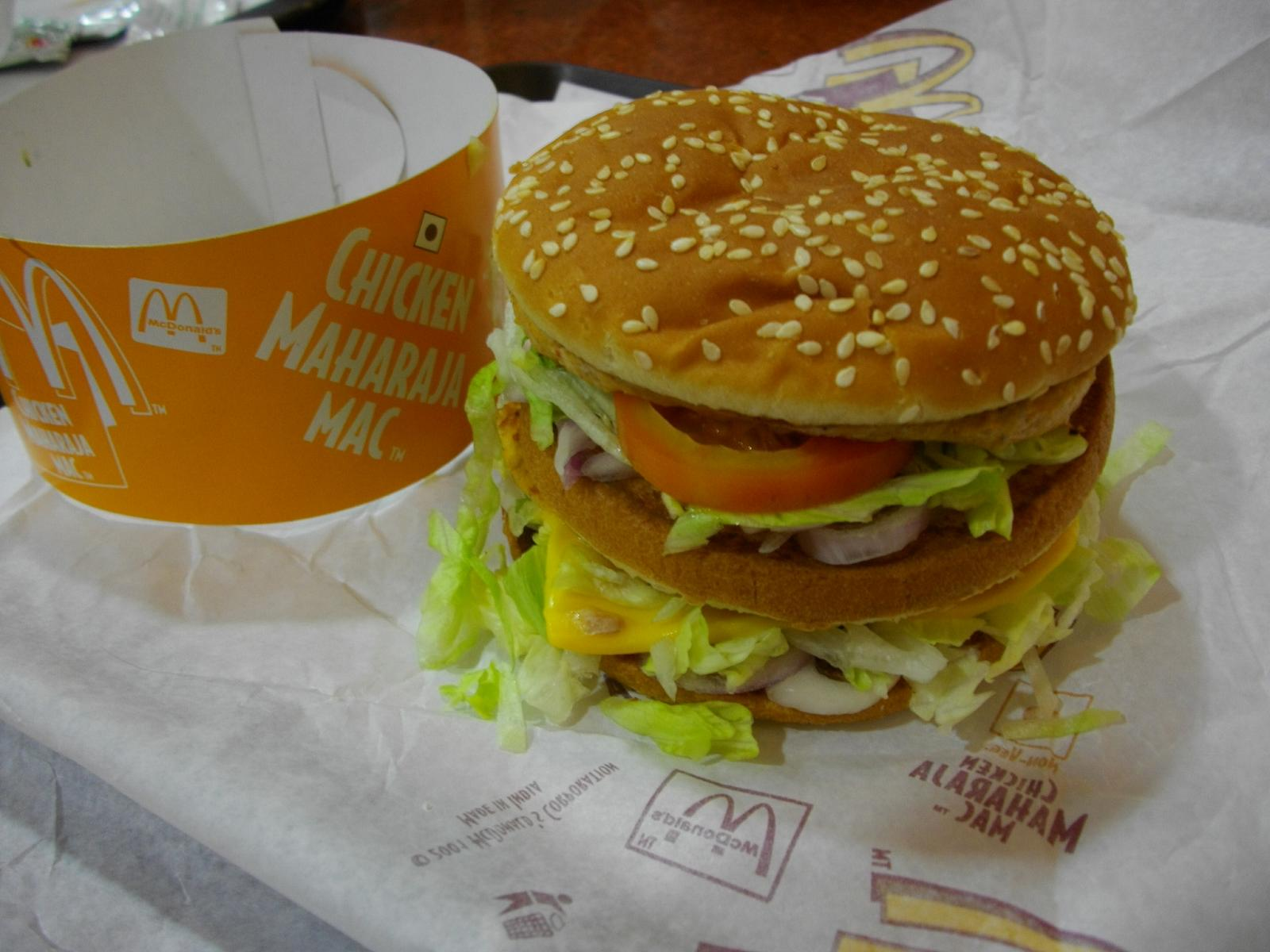
A Chicken Maharaja Mac in India

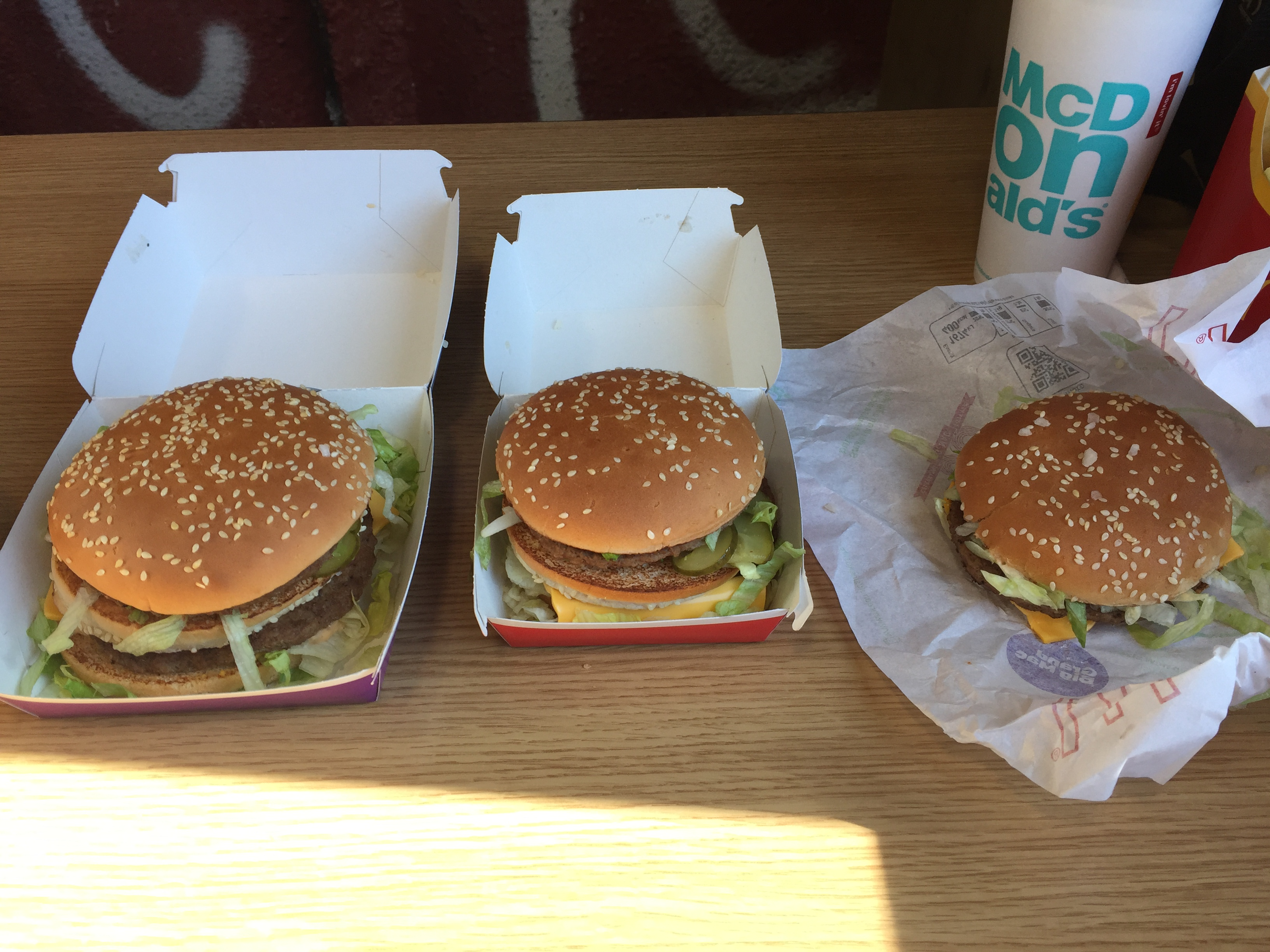
A Grand Big Mac (left) and Mac Jr. (right) alongside a regular Big Mac (center), released for a limited time in the UK as part of the 50th anniversary of the burger

== Museum ==
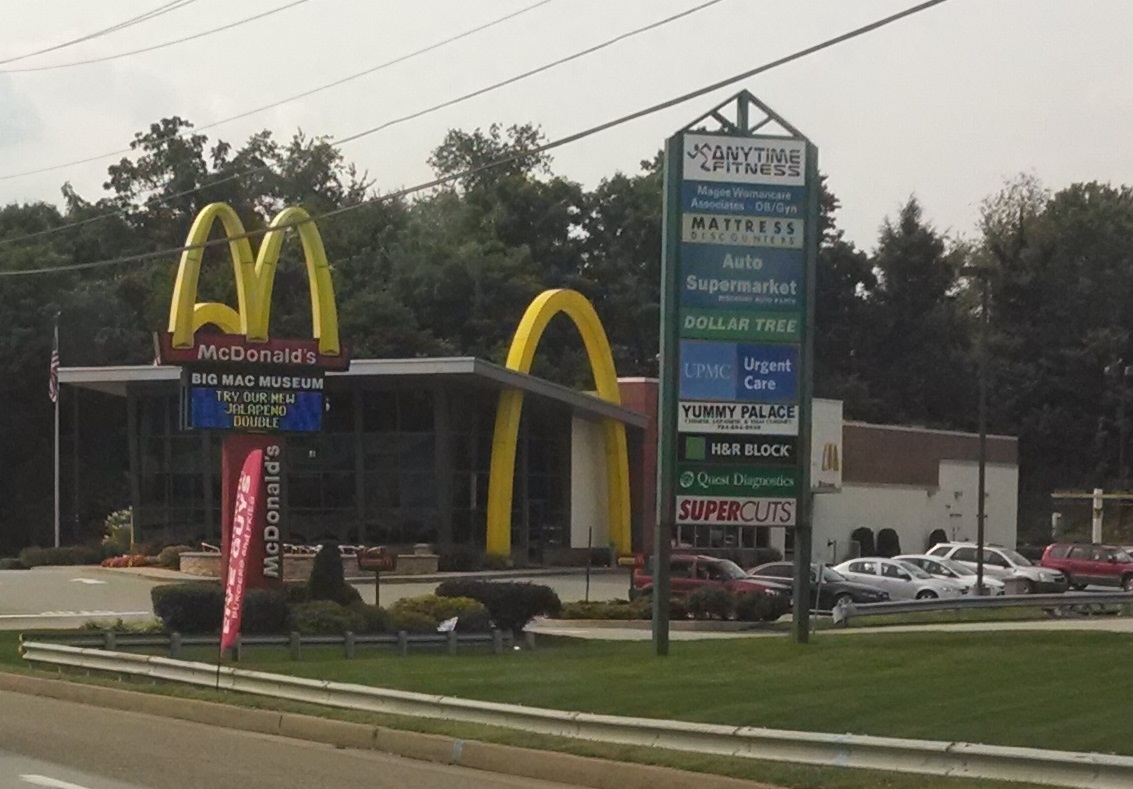
The Big Mac Museum in 2014

On August 22, 2007, McDonald's opened the Big Mac Museum in North Huntingdon, Pennsylvania to celebrate the Big Mac's 40th anniversary. The museum features the world's largest Big Mac statue (measuring 14 feet high and 12 feet wide) and has hundreds of historical artifacts and exhibits that celebrate the Big Mac. Some Uniontown residents were unhappy with the location.

== Nutritional values per geographical location ==
The Big Mac is a geographically localized product. In the United States, the Big Mac has 580 kcal (2,400 kJ), 34 grams of fat and 25 grams of protein. In Australia, it is slightly smaller with 559 kcal (2,340 kJ) and 26.9 grams of fat, but similar amounts of protein with 25.2 grams, while the Japanese burger tops out the scales at 557 kcal and 30.5 grams of fat. Several McDonald's subsidiaries adapt the standard features of the Big Mac (from the US) to regional requirements.

Comparisons of the Big Mac standard nutritional values in different countries – Sodium values converted to their salt equivalents, rounded and in bold
Country	Energy kcal	Carbohydrates g	Protein g	Fat (total) g	Dietary fiber g	Salt equivalent mg	Serving size (weight) g	Reference
Argentina	485	40	24	26	3.3	**2005**		.ar
Australia	559	43.8	25.9	30.3		**2725**	231.7	.au
Austria	495	40	27	25	3	2300	219	.at
Belgium	495	40	27	25		2300		.be
Bosnia and Herzegovina	510	41	27	26	3	2200		.ba (Halted operations.)
Brazil	491	40	26	26	3.8	**2033**		.br
Canada	520	45	23	28	3	**2413**	209	.ca
Chile	562	49	27	30	4	**1009**	213	.cl
China	520	46	26	26				.cn
Croatia	526	42.6	26.7	26.9	3.4	2200		.hr
Czech Republic	510	41	27	26		2200		.cz
Denmark	510	41	27	26.1	3	2200		.info
Egypt	522	52	28.235	30	2	1190	234	.eg
Finland	510	41	27	26	3	2200		.fi
France	508	42	27	26	3.1	2300	221	.info
Germany	510	41	27	26	3	2200	221	.de
Greece	495	40	27	25	3	2300	221	.gr
Hong Kong	497	43.1	26.4	24.2		**2003**		.hk
Hungary	510	41	27	26	3	2200		.info
Ireland	490	41	28	24	4	2100		.ie
Italy	510	42	27	26	3	2200		.it
Japan	557	45.2	25.5	30.5		2800		.jp
Lithuania	509	42	27	26	3.1	2300	219	.lt
Malaysia	484	46	26	23		**1825**	209	.my
Mexico	540	52	25	27	3.28	**2300**	212	.mx
Netherlands	524	43	27	27	3.4	2300	229	.com
New Zealand	494	36.8	26.4	25.9		**2415**	202	.nz
Norway	510	41	27	26	3	2200		.no
Poland	510	41	27	26	3	2200		.info
Portugal	509	42	27	26	3.2	2300	219	.pt
Romania	510	41	27	26	3	2200		.info
Russia	495	40	27	25	3	2300		.info
Serbia	503	40	28	25	3	2300	219	.rs
Singapore	522	43	28	25	3	970		.sg
Slovenia	503	41.2	26	26	3		217	.si
South Africa	496	39	24.3	26	3.2	**2433**		.za
South Korea	510		26			**2533**	213	.kr
Sweden	505	42	26	26	3	2300	219	.se
Switzerland	510	41	27	26	3	2200		.info
Taiwan	530	45	27	26				.tw
Turkey	480	43	28	22		**2100**		.tr
Ukraine	509	42	27	26		**2300**		.ua
United Kingdom	494	42	26	24	3.2	2200		.gb
United States	580	45	25	34	3	**2650**	220	.us

== Gallery ==
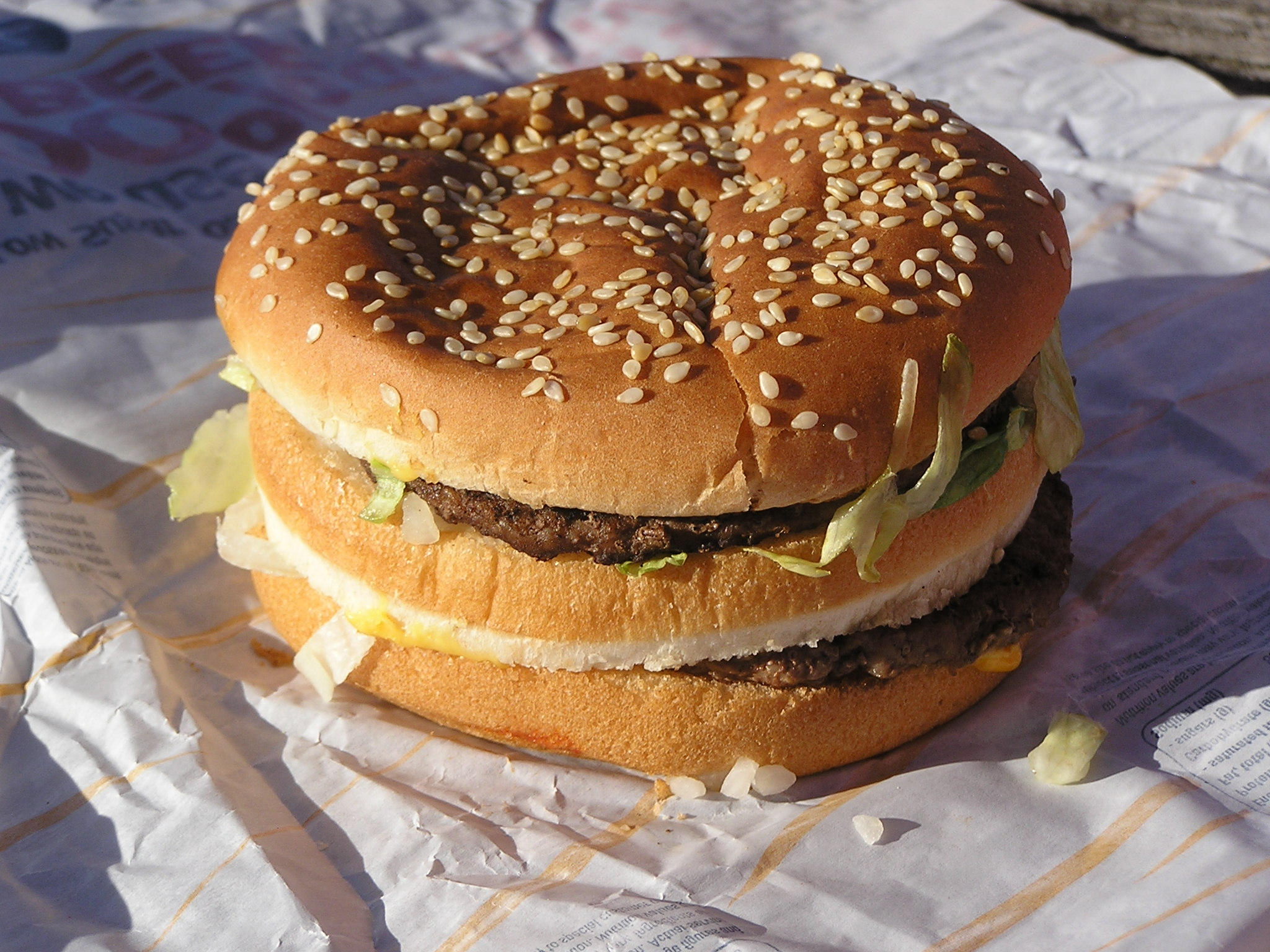
Big Mac, purchased in Canberra, Australia

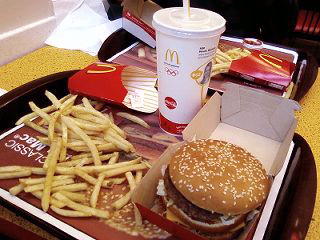
A Big Mac combo meal

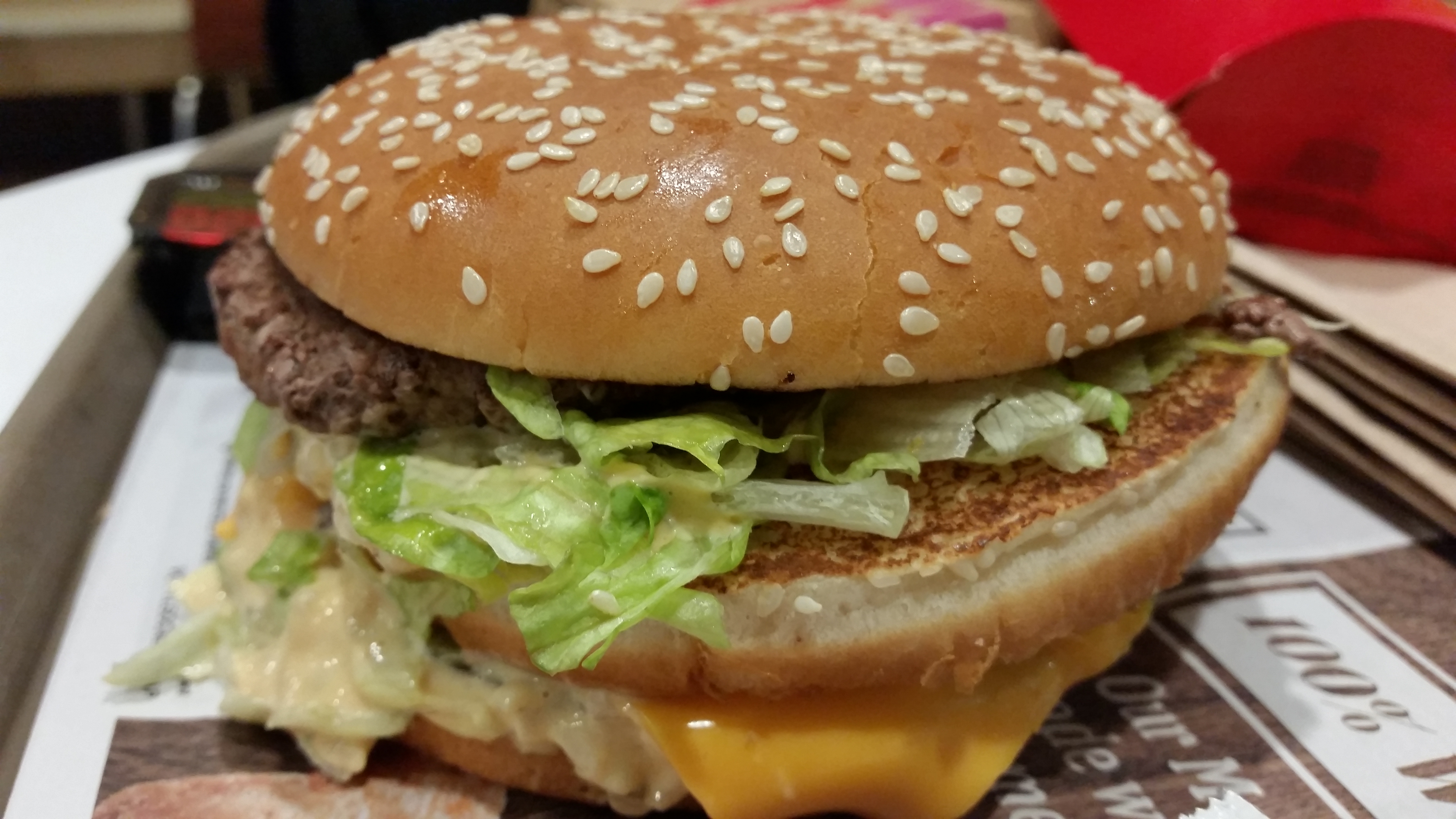
A Grand Big Mac

== See also ==
- Don Gorske, a Big Mac enthusiast who eats on average two per day
- The Big Mac Index, a price index published by The Economist
- List of sandwiches

=== Similar products by other restaurant chains ===
- Big Boy (Big Boy Restaurants and Frisch's Big Boy)
- Big Hardee (Hardee's)
- Big King (Burger King)
- Big Jack (Hungry Jack's), subject of a trademark infringement lawsuit filed by McDonald's.
- Big Shef (Burger Chef)
- Big Wink (Winky's)
- Bonus Jack (Jack in the Box)
- Double-double Animal Style (In-N-Out Burger)
- Superburger (Eat'n Park)
- Teen Burger (A&W Canada) is not a double decker like the Big Mac, but its "teen sauce" is similar to Big Mac sauce.
- Whopper, Burger King's signature sandwich
