= Kothari (surname) =

Kothari is an Indian surname. Notable people with the surname include:

- Ashish Kothari, Indian environmentalist
- Brij Kothari (born 1964), Indian social entrepreneur
- Daulat Singh Kothari (1905–1993), Indian scientist.
- D. P. Kothari (born 1944), Indian educationist and professor
- Neelam Kothari (born 1968), Indian actress and jewellery designer
- Jehangir Kothari (1857-1934), Parsi merchant
- Komal Kothari (1929 – 2004), Indian folklorist and ethnomusicologist from Jodhpur
- Meghna Kothari, Indian film actress
- Miloon Kothari, former United Nations Special Rapporteur
- Priyanka Kothari also known as Nisha Kothari (born 1983), Indian film actress
- Rajni Kothari (died in 2015), Indian political scientist, political theorist and academic
- S. P. Kothari, Indian academic
- Shuchi Kothari, New Zealand-based Indian scriptwriter, and producer
- Sunil Kothari, Indian dance historian, scholar and critic

== See also ==
- Kothari (disambiguation)
