= Kothar =

Kothar may refer to:

- Kothar-wa-Khasis, a Canaanite god
- Kothar, a character created by Gardner Fox
- Kothaar, a member of the heavy metal band Bathory
- Kothar Assembly constituency, Jammu and Kashmir Legislative Assembly, India

== See also ==
- Kowsar (disambiguation)
- Kothari (disambiguation)
