= Kausar =

Arabic given name

Kausar, Kawthar كَوْثَر
- Pronunciation: Arabic: [kauːθar]
- Gender: Unisex

Origin
- Origin: Arabic
- Meaning: "a river in paridise decorated with pearls, smelling of strong musk. "whiter than milk" "sweeter than honey" "gold and silver banks" "rich" abundant, bountiful or plentiful
- Region of origin: Western Asia

Other names
- Related names: Kaouthar, Kauthar, Kaouther, Kautsar, Kawtar, Kawther, Kawter, Kaussar, Kauser

Kausar or Kawthar (Arabic: كَوْثَر) is an Arabic Muslim given name for both males and females, which means "river in paradise decorated with pearls with the scent of sweet musk", "whiter than milk, sweeter than honey", "silver and gold banks", "abundance", "rich", "bountiful" or "plentiful". The name is either a reference to surah Al-Kawthar or Hauzu'l-Kausar, a sacred lake called the "pond of abundance" in Paradise, mentioned in the Quran. The name and its variants are popular in the Muslim world, especially in South Asia, Southeast Asia and Central Asia.

== Variations ==
The name has many variants in different part of the world, due to different Arabic romanization standards used. The variant Kausar, Kautsar and Kawsar mostly used in South Asia, Central Asia and Southeast Asia. While the variant Kawthar and Kaouthar generally used in Western Asia and North Africa. Due to French influence in the Maghreb region, the name is occasionally romanized as Kaouther or Kawther. The given name may refer to:

=== Kaouthar ===
- Kaouthar Bachraoui, Tunisian newscaster
- Kaouthar Ouallal, Algerian judoka

=== Kaouther ===
- Kaouther Ben Hania (born 1977), Tunisian film director
- Kaouther Adimi (born 1986), Algerian writer

=== Kausar ===
- Kausar Ahmed Chaudhury (born 1944), Bangladeshi lyricist
- Kausar Mohammed (born 1992), Bengali-Pakistani-American actress and comedian
- Kausar Abdullah Malik (born 1945), Pakistani scientist
- Kausar Bashir Ahmed (1939–2006), Pakistani architect
- Kausar Chandpuri (1900–1990), Indian physician and writer
- Kausar Munir (born 1977), Indian writer
- Kausar Niazi (1934–1994), Pakistani politician

=== Kawsar ===
- Kawsar Ali Rabbi (born 1996), Bangladeshi footballer

=== Kawtar ===
- Kawtar Boulaid (born 1989), Moroccan runner
- Kawtar Hafidi (born 1972), Moroccan-American physicist

=== Kawthar ===
- Kawthar Zaki (born 1940), Egyptian-American engineer

=== Kawther ===
- Kawther Ramzi (1931–2018), Egyptian actress
