= Kothari =

Kothari may refer to:

- Kothari (temple), in the Swaminarayan Hindu Faith
- Kothari Commission
- Kothari River, Rajasthan
- Kothari (surname)

== See also ==
- Kotharia (disambiguation)
- Kothar (disambiguation)
- Kotha (disambiguation)
