= Thermal bag =

Thermally insulating container

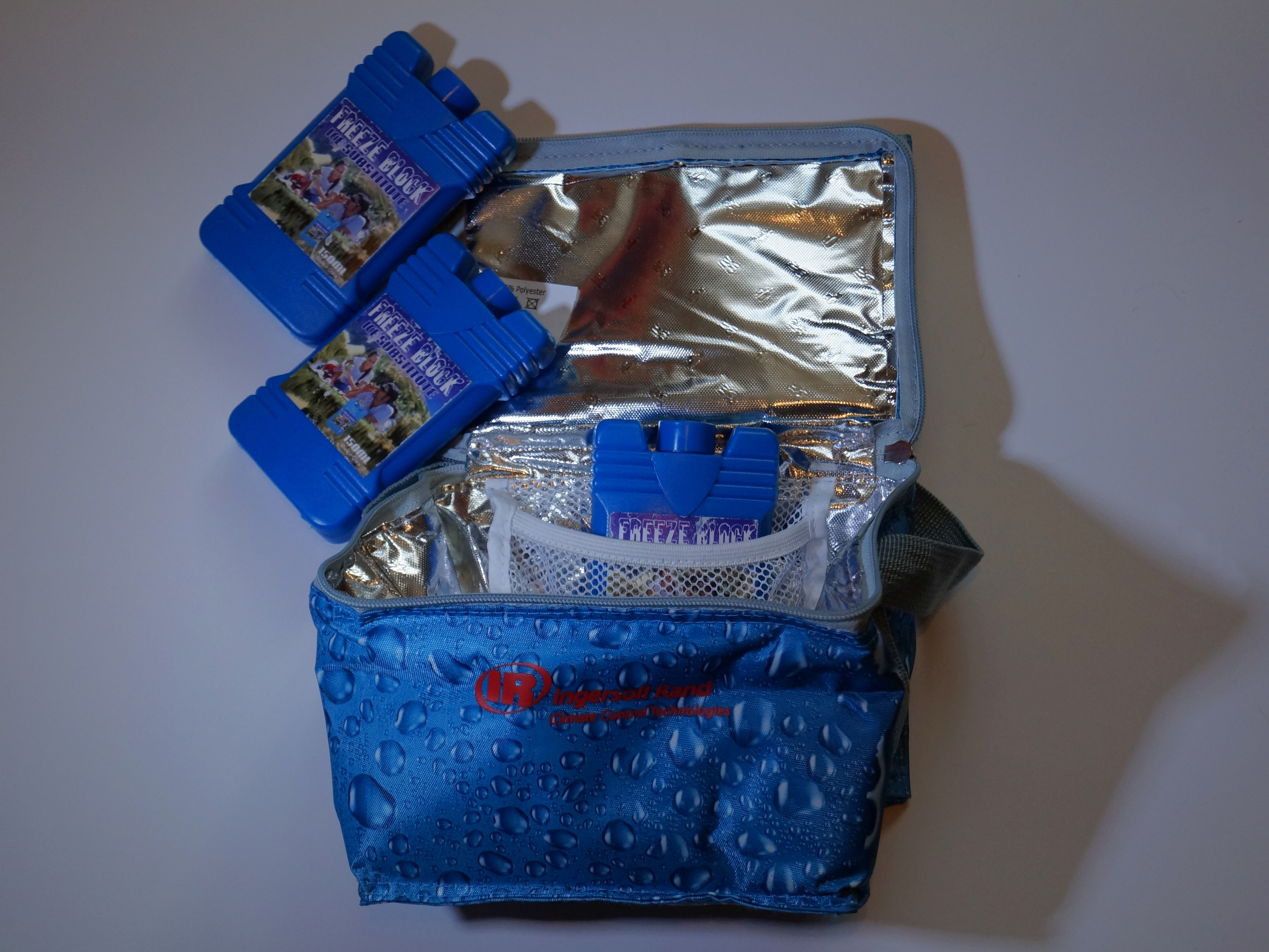
Thermally insulated bag with ice packs

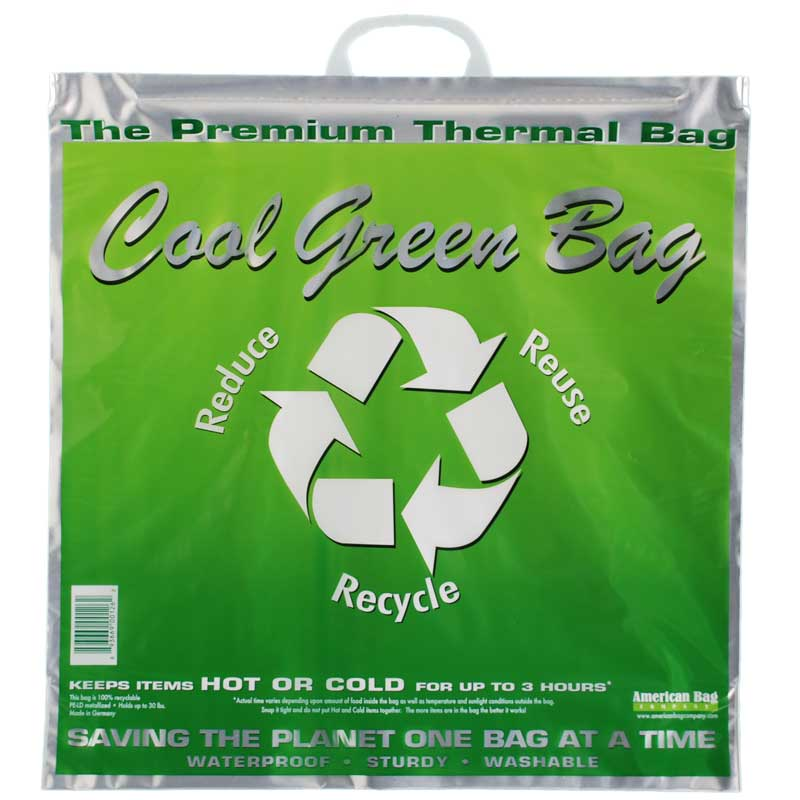
Example of a thermal bag

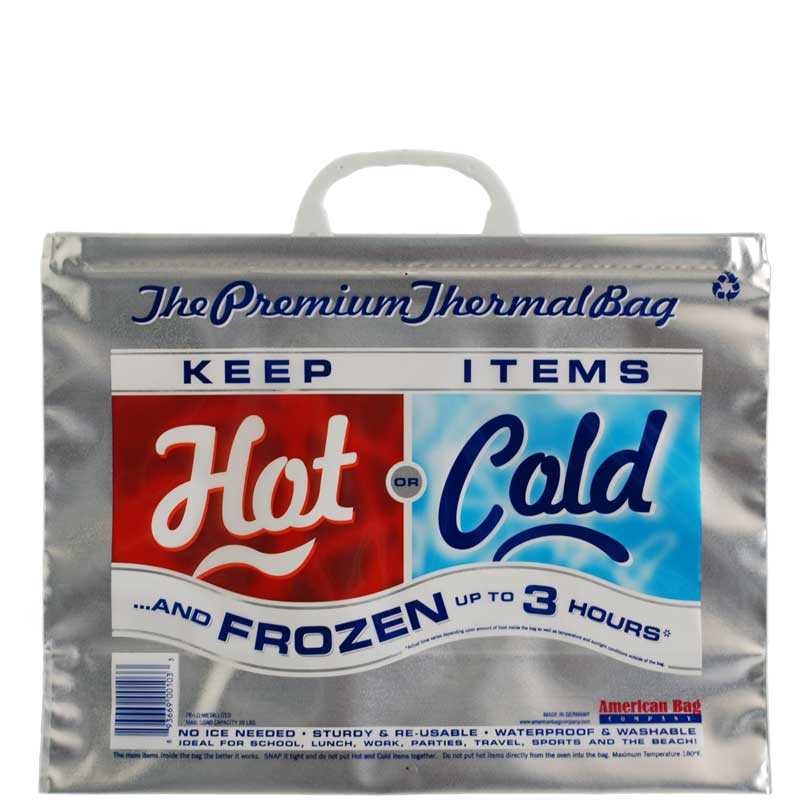
Example of a thermal bag

A thermal bag is a type of thermally insulated shipping container in the form of a bag which can be carried, usually made of thermally insulating materials and sometimes a refrigerant gel. It is used to help maintain the temperature of its contents, keeping cold items cold, and hot items hot.

Insulated bags have been in use for many years in industry, medical/pharmaceutical use, food delivery, lunch bags, etc. Several designs have been available.

== Shopping bags ==
Commercial thermal shopping bags, to carry temperature-sensitive purchases home without breaking the cold chain, were first introduced by grocery and other shops in Europe in the mid-1980s. A thermal bag to keep pizzas being delivered hot was invented by Ingrid Kosar in 1983, and is commonly used now. A cool box is very similar in concept, but typically larger and in the form of a rigid box.

== Medical use ==
Thermal pharmaceutical bags are designed to transport temperature-sensitive medications, protecting them from damaging temperatures, shocks, and light. Many vaccines are delicate biological substances that can lose part or all of their effectiveness if they are frozen, allowed to get too hot, or exposed to bright light. Such vaccines must be kept within a specified temperature range, typically 2 to 8 °C (36 to 46 °F), from manufacture to use. According to the World Health Organization, at least 7% of temperature-sensitive medical products suffer significant degradation in potency in transit.

== Materials ==
Thermal bags are usually manufactured with varying quantities of the following materials:

- PET film (biaxially oriented) (Mylar, etc.)
- Styrofoam
- Fabric
- Nonwovens
- Polyethylene
- Polyurethane
- Polypropylene
- gel packs

== See also ==
- Food safety
- HACCP
- Heat transfer
- Packaging
- Temperature control
- Insulated shipping container
