= Kaouthar Bachraoui =

Tunisian media personality

- Born: 1950 (age 74–75)
- Occupation(s): Television presenter, Correspondent

Kaouthar Bachraoui (Arabic: كوثر البشراوي) is a Tunisian media personality. She was born to a Tunisian father and an Italian mother. She started her career at the Tunisian national TV. She joined MBC and presented the program As-Sahra Al-Maftouha (The Open Soirée). She then joined Al Jazeera where she presented the talk show Ishrakat (Reflections) for two years. She later resigned because its then Managing Director Mohammed Jasim Al-Ali degraded her. She later became part of Al-Arabiya where she presented the weekly program Manarat (Beacons). Bachraoui put an end to her short experience with Al-Arabiya and joined the Arab Thought Foundation. Kouthar Bachraoui's TV programs are cultural. She has Arab nationalist views.

== Personal life ==
She married once and divorced, and has a son named Youssef.

== Kaouthar ==
Kaouthar is a 2014 documentary film about Kaouthar Bachraoui.
