= Kowsareh =

Kowsareh كوثره
- Village
- Location within Iran
- Coordinates: 31°59′00″N 49°24′19″E
- Country: Iran
- Province: Khuzestan
- County: Masjed Soleyman
- Bakhsh: Golgir
- Rural District: Tolbozan

Population (2006)
  - Total: 109
- Time zone: UTC+3:30 (IRST)
  - Summer (DST): UTC+4:30 (IRDT)

Kowsareh (Persian: كوثره, also Romanized as Kowsāreh and Kows̄areh; also known as Kows̄ar and Kowshareh) is a village in Tolbozan Rural District, Golgir District, Masjed Soleyman County, Khuzestan Province, Iran. At the 2006 census, its population was 109, in 19 families.
