= Ingrid Kosar =

American inventor

- Born: 1948 (age 77–78)
- Education: Northern Illinois University
- Known for: Inventing thermal bag

Ingrid Kosar (born 1948) is an American inventor and creator of the thermal bag.

== Early life and education ==
Kosar grew up in Des Plaines, Illinois. Her father was an accountant and ran his own company. He died when she was young, and her mother turned the property into a beauty salon. Losing her father made her passionate about preserving food. Kosar attended Northern Illinois University, where she majored in journalism.

== Career ==
Kosar started her career as a buyer for an engineering company. She says that at that age she was eating a lot of pizza. At the time, Domino's Pizza dominated the United States pizza delivery market, and their innovative new pizza box was keeping pizza secure. Kosar was inspired by a padded cotton lunch bag she had seen at a craft fair. She was challenged by Domino's Pizza to create a bag that could keep a temperature of 140 degrees Fahrenheit.

Kosar invented a thermal bag used to keep pizza warm. She launched her insulated pizza bag company, "Thermal Bags by Ingrid", in 1983. She ensured the bag was big enough to hold multiple cartons, flexible enough to handle without difficulty, and able to endure any spillages. Her 1984 patent application describes the bag as "soft-sided thermally insulated carrying cases". The bag combined a breathable, food-safe layer of polyester, 1,000 denier Cordura nylon and a thin nylon lining. It incorporated Thinsulate fabric. The breathable layer ensures steam can escape so that the crust stays crispy. Domino's Pizza were Kosar's largest customer. The same bag technology was used by NASA, who deployed the bag in outer space to study crystalization. It was listed as the world's largest pizza bag by the Guinness World Records in 2000.

Kosar's patents expired in the early 2000s, and cheaper bags from China started to infiltrate the market. Kosar filed for personal bankruptcy in 2010, but managed to maintain the company, and work her way out of bankruptcy within four years. She has continued to develop thermal bags for a range of customers, including a European stem cell bank. She created a series of covers for bun racks for bakers, with customers including Panera Bread.
