= McDouble =

Hamburger sold by McDonald's

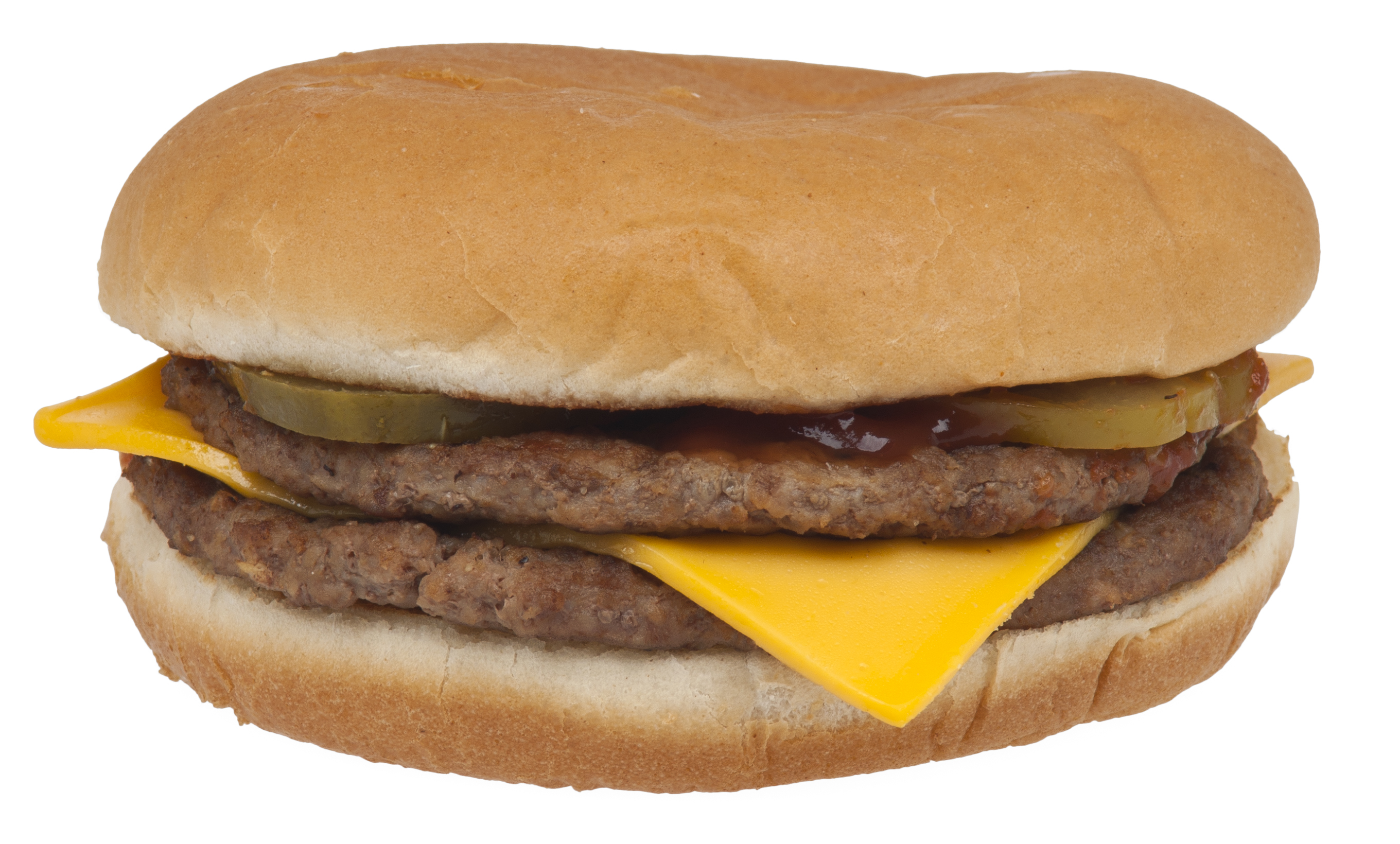
- ^{†}Percentages estimated using US recommendations for adults.

The McDouble is a hamburger sold by the fast-food restaurant chain McDonald's. It is a variation of the double cheeseburger, consisting of two beef patties with one slice of cheese. The "McDouble" name was introduced in 1964, but the modern McDouble cheeseburger was introduced in 1997. It is one of the cheapest products sold by the company, and for this reason is often included in the chain's budget menus. The burger is almost identical to a Double Cheeseburger, except for the extra slice of cheese in the cheeseburger.

== Description ==
As of 2025, the McDouble contains 390 calories, 22g of protein, 32g of carbs, and 20g of total fat.

It is the cheapest way to buy a burger similar to the Big Mac, and has also been referred to as a lifehack, as the burger is half the price of a Big Mac, while still containing the same amount of beef.

== History ==
The McDouble was introduced in 1997, garnished with lettuce, tomatoes, and mayonnaise instead of the cheese that currently tops it.

The Bacon McDouble was introduced and cost $2 as of 2015. This sandwich was also added to the U.S. "Dollar Menu & More" in November 2013.

The Daily Double, similar to the McDouble but with slightly different toppings, was test marketed in 2011 and 2012.

== See also ==
- List of McDonald's products
- List of sandwiches
