= Salt equivalent =

Salt equivalent is usually quoted on food nutrition information tables on food labels, and is a different way of defining sodium intake, noting that salt is chemically sodium chloride.

To convert from sodium to the approximate salt equivalent, multiply sodium content by 2.5:

$\frac{m_\mathrm{NaCl}}{m_\mathrm{Na}} = \frac{m_\mathrm{Na}+m_\mathrm{Cl}}{m_\mathrm{Na}} \approx \frac{23\mathrm{u} + 35.5\mathrm{u}}{23\mathrm{u}} = \frac{58.5}{23} \approx 2.5$

(see: atomic mass and molecular mass).

== Sources ==
- British Nutrition Foundation article on salt
- InnerBuddies Personalised Insights
