= Joie =

Joie is a name and is French for "joy."

== As a given name ==
- Joie Chen (born 1961), American television anchor
- Joie Chitwood (1912–1988), American racecar driver and businessman
- Joie Chitwood III (born 1971), American racecar driver and businessman
- Joie Davidow, American author and editor
- Joie Lee (born 1962), American screenwriter, film producer and actress
- Joie Ray (disambiguation), multiple people, including:
  - Joie Ray (runner) (1894–1978), American middle and long distance runner
  - Joie Ray (racing driver) (1923–2007), American open-wheel and stock-car racer

== As a surname ==
- Chester Joie, Boston slave

== See also ==
- Joy (given name)
- Joey (given name)
- Lajoie (disambiguation)
- Joie de vivre
