= Joy (given name) =

- Pronunciation: /ˈdʒɔɪ/
- Gender: Male in Kerala, India; Unisex in Western Countries
- Language: English

Origin
- Language: English
- Origin: From the word Joseph or joy
- Derivation: Malayalam: Ouseph, Joseph, Jose; English: Joy
- Meaning: "Joseph"; "Josef"; "Jose"; "joy"; "happiness"; "joyful"
- Region of origin: Kerala; England

Other names
- Variant form: Joye
- Related names: Joyce, Joie, Gioia

Joy is a common unisex given name. Among Saint Thomas Christians in Kerala it is a shorten form for Joseph, Ouseph or Jose. A common variant of the name is the other female given name Joyce (name). The meaning of the name can mean, Josef, Joseph, joy, happiness.

== St. Thomas tradition, Kerala ==
Joy is a given name commonly used among Malayalam-speaking St. Thomas Christian communities, particularly in the Indian state of Kerala. In some Kerala Christian families, Joy is used as a familiar or personal name for individuals whose traditional or baptismal name is Joseph. This usage developed through local Christian naming customs, where biblical names are sometimes accompanied by shorter English or household names. Therefore, in this cultural context, a person known as Joy may also have Joseph as his formal or baptismal name.

== Etymology ==
The name Joseph originates from the Hebrew name Yosef (יוֹסֵף), traditionally interpreted as “he will add” or “God will increase.” Malayalam Christian forms of Joseph include Ouseph, Youseph, and related regional variants.

The English name Joy, however, literally means “happiness” or “delight” and is not a direct Malayalam translation of Joseph. Its connection with Joseph in Kerala is therefore based primarily on Christian naming tradition and personal usage rather than linguistic meaning.

== People with the given name Joy ==
- Joy (singer) (born 1996), South Korean singer and member of Red Velvet (group)
- Joy Adamson (1910–1980), wildlife rehabilitator and author
- Joy Alukkas (born 1956), Indian businessman from Kerala
- Joy Ballard (born 1966), British retired head teacher
- Joy Banerjee (born 1963), Bengali cinema actor
- Joy Behar (born 1942), American comedian and actress
- Joy Bokiri (born 1998), Nigerian women's footballer
- Joy Browne (1944–2016), American radio psychologist
- Joy Bryant (born 1974), American actress
- Joy Burke (born 1990), Taiwanese-American women's basketball player
- Joy Carroll, Vicar who inspired The Vicar of Dibley
- Joy Cheek (born 1988), American basketball player
- Joy Cherian (born 1942), Commissioner at the United States Equal Employment Opportunity Commission
- Joy Crookes (born 1998), British singer-songwriter
- Joy Davidman (1915–1960), American writer and wife of C. S. Lewis
- Joy Destiny Tobing (born 1980), Indonesian gospel singer
- Joy Enriquez (born 1978), American singer and actress
- Joy Fawcett (born 1968), American soccer player
- Joy Fleming (1944–2017), German singer
- Defne Joy Foster (1975–2011), Turkish actress, presenter, VJ
- Joy Garnett (born 1965) Canadian-American artist
- Joy Giovanni (born 1978), American actress, model, wrestler, and WWE Diva
- Joy Grieveson (born 1941), British track and field athlete
- Joy Paul Guilford (1897–1987), American psychologist
- Joy Harjo (born 1951), American poet
- Joy Harmon (1940–2026), American actress
- Joy Hohn, American politician
- Joy Kere diplomat from the Solomon Islands
- Joy Kogawa (born 1935), Canadian poet and novelist
- Joy Labinjo (born c. 1994), Nigerian-British visual mixed-media artist and painter
- Joy Laking (born 1950), Canadian visual artist and author
- Joy Lauren (born 1989), American actress
- Joy Lofthouse (1923–2017), British WW2 pilot
- Joy MacPhail (born 1952), Canadian politician
- Joy Mangano (born 1956), American inventor, and businesswoman
- Joy Marshall (1867–1903), New Zealand clergyman, teacher, tennis player, cricketer, and rugby footballer
- Joy Mathew (born 1961) Kerala film and theatre actor, director, playwright and screenwriter
- Joy Morris (born 1970), Canadian mathematician
- Joy Morton (1855–1934), American businessman and conservationist
- Joy Mukherjee (1939–2012), Indian film actor and director
- Joy Newton (1913–1996), English ballet dancer and teacher
- Joy Ogwu (1946–2025), Nigerian politician and diplomat
- Joy Oladokun, American singer-songwriter
- Joy Padgett (born 1947), American politician
- Joy Powell (born 1962), American activist
- Joy Puthussery Joseph (born 1949), Kerala Politician
- Joy Quigley (born 1948), New Zealand politician
- Joy Reid (born 1968), American cable television host with the full name Joy-Ann M. Lomena-Reid
- Joy San Buenaventura (born 1959), Filipino-born American politician
- Joy Sarkar, Bengali music director
- Joy Sengupta (born 1968), Indian film and stage actor
- Joy Smith (born 1947), Canadian politician
- Joy Spence (born 1951), Jamaican master blender
- Joy St. Omer (2001/2002–2026), Saint Lucian murder victim
- Joy A. Thomas (1963–2020), American Indian-born informational theorist and scientist
- Joy Viado (1959–2016), Filipino comedian and actress
- Joy Williams (singer) (born 1982), American pop singer
- Joy Williams (Australian writer) (1942–2006), Australian poet
- Joy Williams (American writer) (born 1944), American author
- Joy Wolfram (born 1989), Finnish nanoscientist

== Fictional characters ==
- Joy, one of Riley Andersen's emotions and the main protagonist of Disney Pixar's Inside Out.
- Nurse Joy, a nurse from the Pokémon TV series.

== See also ==
- Gioia (disambiguation), the Italian version of the name
- Joie, the French version of the name
