= Indianapolis 500 pace cars =

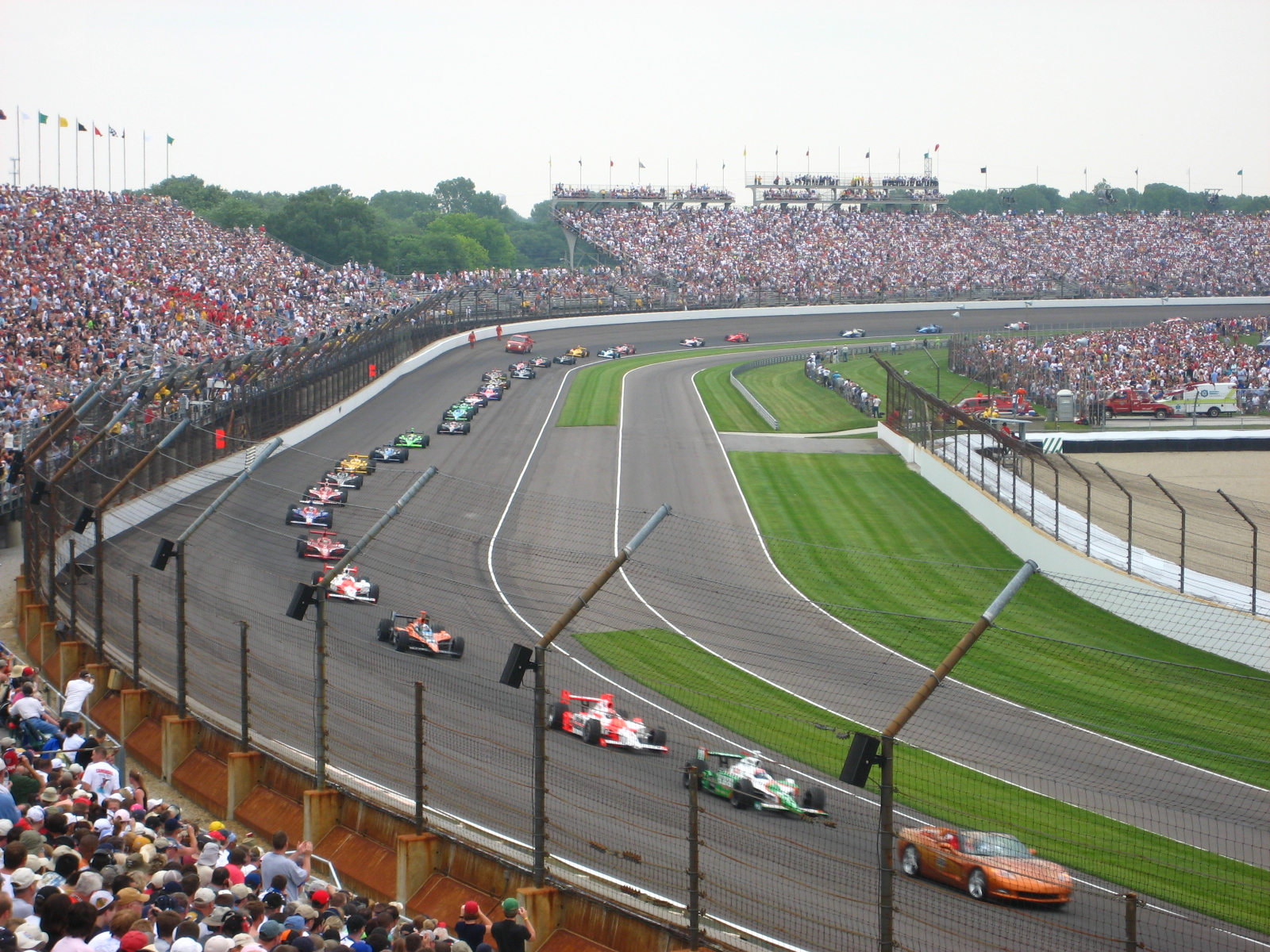
The pace car (a Chevrolet Corvette) leads the field past an accident site at the 2007 Indianapolis 500.

The Indianapolis 500 auto race has used a pace car every year since 1911. The pace car is utilized for two primary purposes. At the start of the race, the pace car leads the assembled starting grid around the track for a predetermined number of unscored warm-up laps. Then if the officials deem appropriate, it releases the field at a purposeful speed to start the race. In addition, during yellow flag caution periods, the pace car enters the track and picks up the leader, bunching the field up at a reduced speed.

Prior to the first "500" in 1911, in the interest of safety, Indianapolis Motor Speedway founder Carl G. Fisher is commonly credited with the concept of a "rolling start" led by a pace car. Nearly all races at the time, as well as all Formula One races even to the present, utilize a standing start.

In almost every year since 1936, it has been a tradition that the winner of the Indianapolis 500 be presented with one of that year's pace cars (or a replica). In most years since 1911, the driver of the pace car at the start of the race has been an invited celebrity, a former racing driver, or notable figure in the automotive industry. Historically, the honor of supplying the pace car was, and continues to be, a coveted honor by the respective automobile manufacturers and a marketing showcase for the particular make/model.

== Pace lap formats ==
=== 1911–1956 ===
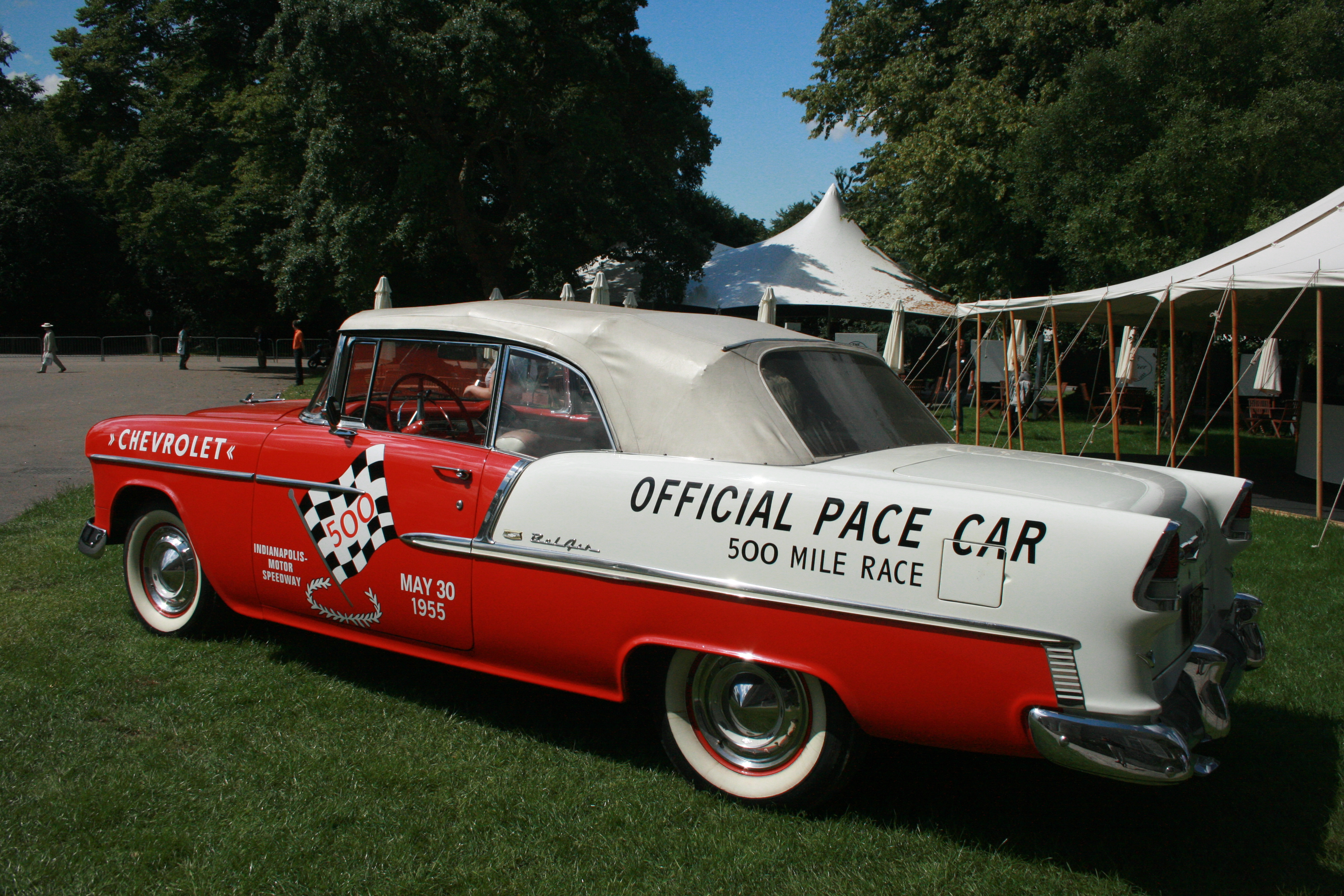
1955 Chevrolet Bel Air Pace Car

The pace car was used to take the starting field on one unscored lap. The field would use the lap to warm up their engines, tires, and then at the conclusion of the lap, at a prescribed speed, the pace car would pull off the track and allow for a rolling or "flying" start. Fisher himself drove the pace car in several early years, but it eventually became an honorary position, with invitations extended to former winners, notable figures in auto racing or the automobile industry. The invited driver was given the honor of "pacemaker," and manufacturers used the honor of providing the car as marketing exposure.

During his tenure as Speedway president, Tony Hulman rode in the pace car nearly every year, immediately after giving the command to start engines. His primary duty was to marshal the start and in some years, his responsibilities included operating a film camera that would be housed inside the car's trunk.

Dating back to the very early years, the pace cars were often painted with special liveries complete with logos, lettering, pinstriping, and other decorative markings. In addition, sometimes flagpoles, lights, and other motoring paraphernalia were installed to further identify the pace car. Most manufacturers used the opportunity to showcase their higher end or luxury models. Since in the early years, the pace car was only used for one lap at the start (and not during caution periods), the need for a high performance machine (i.e., sports car) was not necessarily the top priority. In many years, the pace car was a convertible, which along with increasing the luxury status of the vehicle, it aided in the officials' ability to marshal the start.

=== 1957–1976 ===
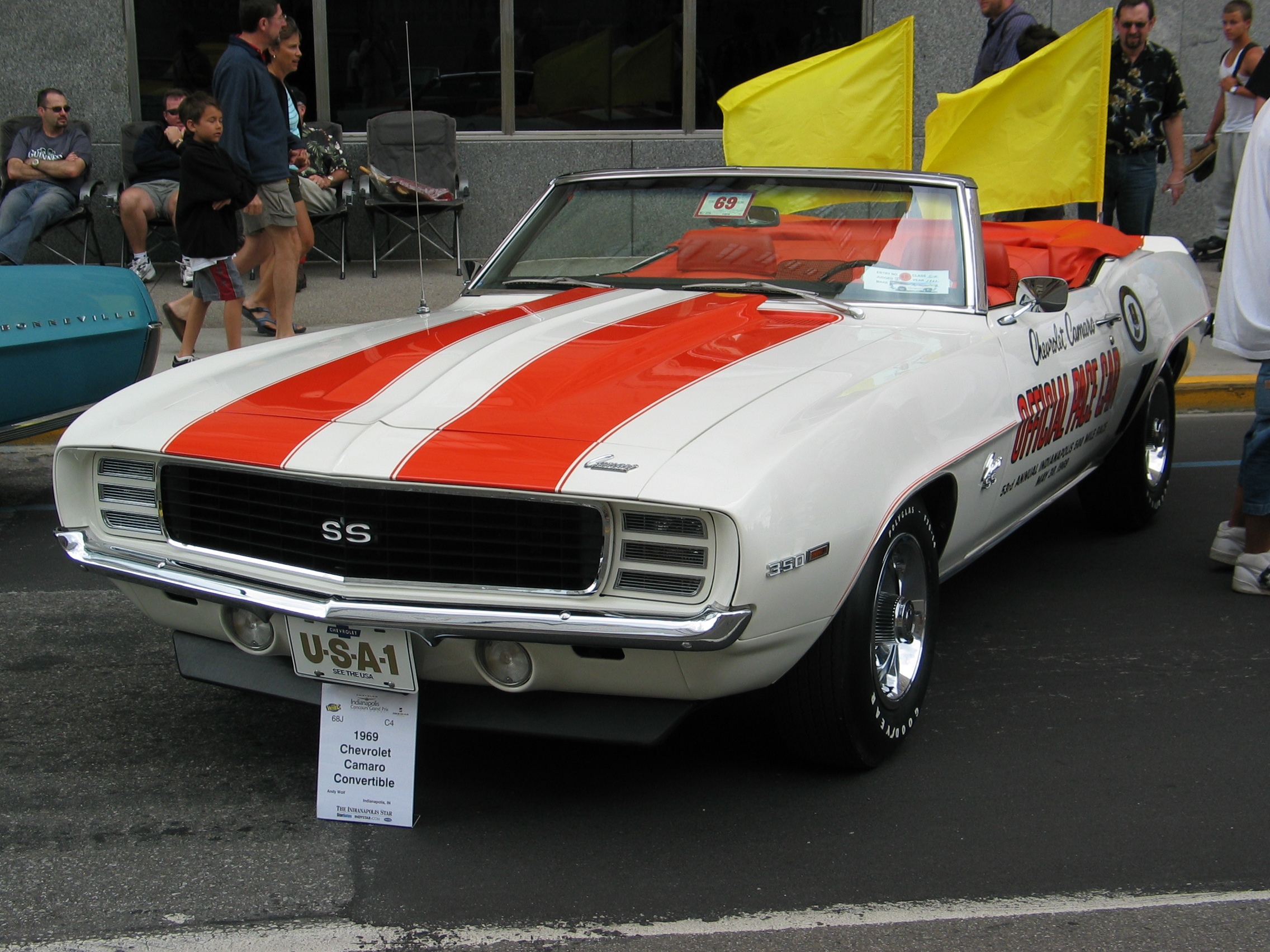
1969 Chevrolet Camaro Pace Car

In most years through the early 1950s, the pace car led the field around the track for one warm up lap, and then the race began. The pace lap concept was popular with fans, as many drivers commonly waved at the fans and the rolling grid made for spectacular photographs. By 1957, the procedure was changed so the pace car led the field for two warm up laps. This allowed extra time to warm up the engines, oil temperatures, and tires, and allowed the drivers the chance to survey the conditions of the entire track at least once before receiving the green flag. This also allowed the fans on the main stretch (where the largest grandstands are located) to see the entire field parade by one time before the start. Previously only fans on other parts of the track got to actually see the grid go by for photographs and waving.

For the 1957–1958 races, the grid was lined up and exited single-file from the newly constructed pit lane. The two laps allowed the field to properly form up, however, in practice it turned out to be difficult and both races saw incidents at the start. In 1959, the field went back to lining up the grid on the main stretch, and continues to do so to this day.

By the late 1960s, not only would a special driver be behind the wheel of the pace car, but numerous celebrities would be invited to ride along as passengers. Automotive executives, NASA astronauts, reporters from ABC Sports and the IMS Radio Network, and other celebrities were among those invited to ride in the pace car.

In 1971, local Indianapolis Dodge dealer Eldon Palmer was involved in a crash driving the pace car. He crashed into a photographer's stand at the south end of the pit area, injuring several persons. In the years immediately following, the pace car driver utilized would only be an experienced race driver. Former Indy winner Jim Rathmann served six times (and once for caution periods only). Celebrities James Garner and Marty Robbins were chosen in part due to their experience in racing.

=== 1977–present ===
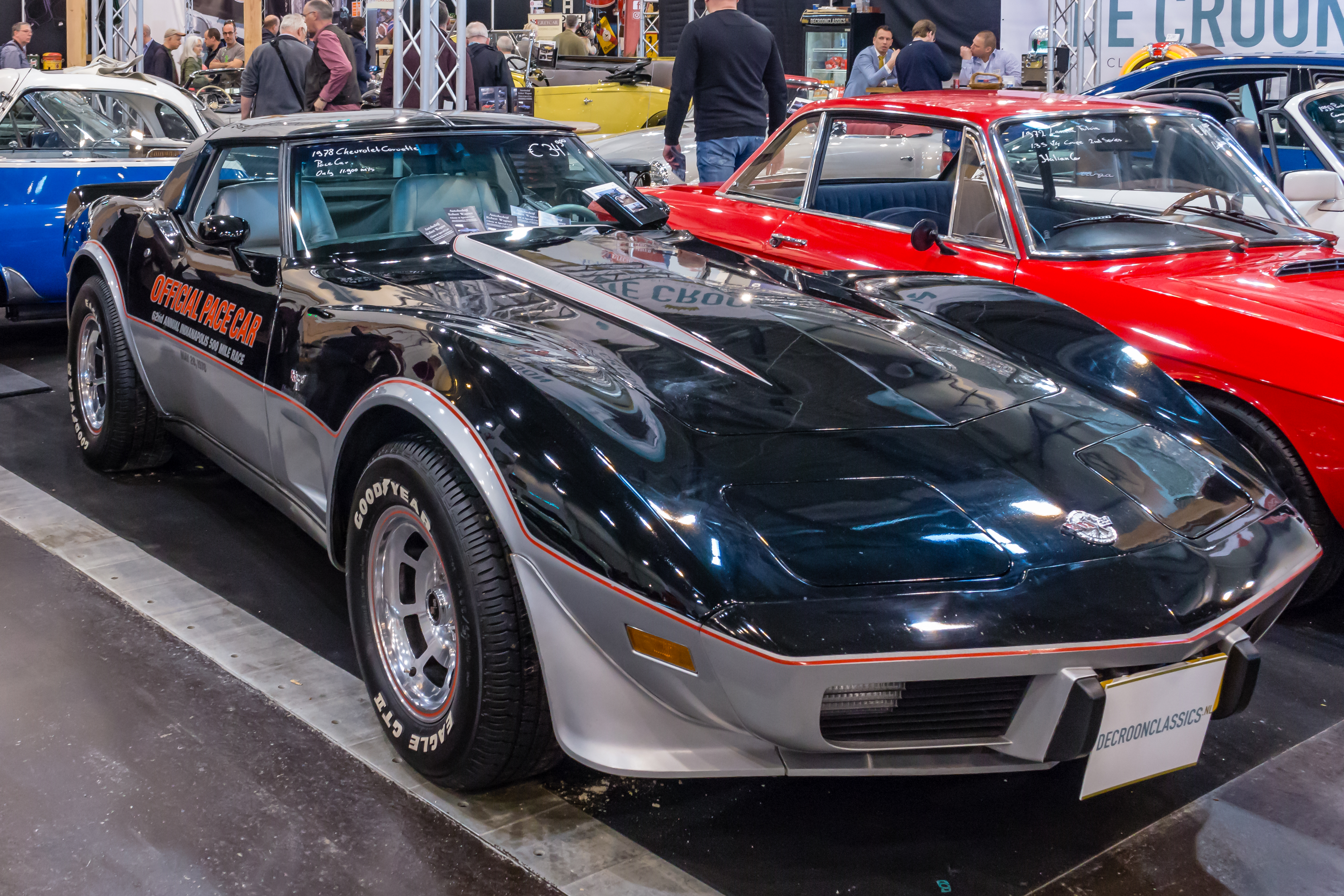
1978 Chevrolet Corvette 25th Anniversary Edition pace car

In 1977, the format was changed to three warm up laps - two "parade laps" and one "pace lap". During the parade lap(s), often several replica festival pace cars join the field, usually carrying celebrities and/or special guest drivers. The 1978 race was the first to feature multiple pace cars on the track during the parade lap. Since 2010, the IndyCar "two-seater" (a retired Indy race car modified with a special passenger seat) has also been at the front of the field, carrying a celebrity or special guest. The non-participating vehicles pull off the track after one or two circuits, and the lone official pace car leads the field on the pace lap. In 2012, it was further expanded to four warm up laps (three "parade" laps and one "pace" lap), coinciding with the introduction of a new engine and chassis formula.

Starting in about 1994, the field was observed to be quite straggled about during the parade lap(s), and often circulated the track single-file. Drivers were known to weave back and forth, sometimes vigorously, in an effort to build up tire temperature. On the final pace lap, the field would finally form up into the eleven rows of three on the backstretch, but oftentimes it was still loose and not in pristine order. This practice was often the subject of harsh criticism from fans and media, especially when the start was strung out single file, breaking tradition. In 2010, officials announced they were going to police the parade and pace laps closer, requiring the drivers to stay in the rows of three during the extent of the warm up period.

In later years, the Speedway began experimenting with using pop culture celebrities driving the pace cars, a change that has met with mixed responses from fans. Racers have taken the position in more recent years. A. J. Foyt drove in 2011, Dario Franchitti drove in 2014, Jeff Gordon, a five-time Big Machine Vodka 400 winner, drove in 2015, and with the new broadcast partner NBC Sports, their motorsport broadcaster Dale Earnhardt Jr., who made 16 Big Machine Vodka 400 starts and a two-time Indiana 250 winning car owner at the Speedway, drove in 2019.

=== Extra pace laps ===
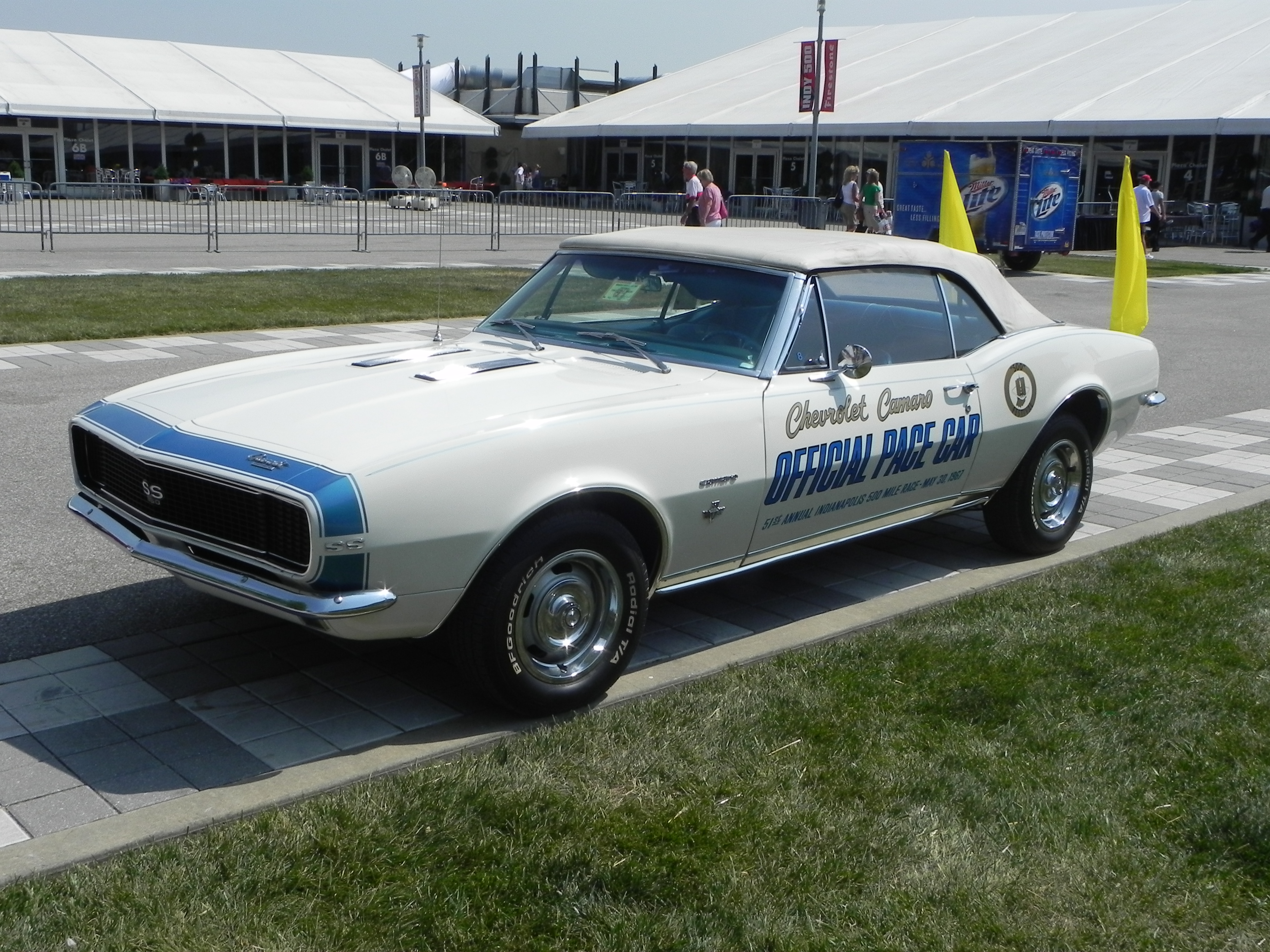
1967 Chevrolet Camaro

1957: A new state-of-the-art pit lane was built. For the first time, the pit area was separated from the racing surface. For 1957–1958, the field was lined up in single file on the pit lane, rather than the traditional 11 rows of three on the race surface. This required the cars to pull away, then assemble into formation. This caused tremendous confusion in 1958, as the front row escaped from the pace car, and the field needed an extra pace lap to assemble before the green was displayed.

1967: The race was red-flagged for rain after 18 laps. The conclusion of the race was moved to the following day. At the time, the pace car was not used for caution periods. However, officials decided to utilize the pace car for the resumption on lap 19. The original pace car driver Mauri Rose drove the car for the restart as well. Two unscored laps (one parade lap and one pace lap) preceded the resumption at lap 19.

1970: Jim Malloy hit the outside wall in turn four as the field was about the take the green flag. The start was waved off, and the next time by, the field was red flagged to clean up the incident. The teams were allowed to replenish a few gallons of used up fuel, and a short time later, the field pulled away for two new pace laps.

1973: A crash occurred as the field was about to take the green flag. The start was red flagged, after driver Spike Galhausen, from Indianapolis, crashed into the outer wall warming his cold tires and the cars circulated around back to the pits. After clean up, the field restarted, with two pace laps before the green flag.

1982: As the field prepared to take the green flag Kevin Cogan was in a crash that also took out Mario Andretti & Dale Whittington. The start was waved off and red flagged by Flagman Duane Sweeney. After the incident was cleaned up the drivers pulled out of the pits for two extra pace laps before taking the green flag.

1986: Tom Sneva crashed on the backstretch on the pace lap. The start was waved off, and the next time around the cars were halted on the frontstretch with a red flag. During the cleanup, officials decided to replenish the teams' fuel tanks with 3 gallons of methanol. After that was completed, the field restarted, and took two warm up laps before the green flag.

1992: Additional pace laps were run (unscored) after Roberto Guerrero crashed during a parade lap. Instead of halting the proceedings, officials decided to simply extend the number of warm up laps. The race itself ended up having 85 laps of yellow flag conditions, therefore the fuel allotment did not become a factor.

1997: Additional laps were run (unscored) due to a three-car crash on the original pace lap.

2009: When the field came out of turn four for the start, the field was not well aligned in the eleven rows of three. For the first time in modern history, the flagman decided to wave off the start, by displaying the yellow flag. The lap was not scored. The field re-formed, and received the green flag the next time by, with a slightly better formation.

== Caution periods ==
Through 1978, the pace car was only used at the start of the race, and was not used during caution periods. Since 1979, the pace car has also been used to pack up the field during caution flag periods. The ceremonial driver drove only at the start of the race. During caution periods, when the pace car is utilized to pace the field, a trained official has been the driver. In some cases, the officials utilize two separate pace cars (exactly the same models) one each for the start of the race, and the caution periods. Currently, the pace car driver for the caution periods is the same driver who drives the pace car for the IndyCar Series during all other events.

== Cars ==
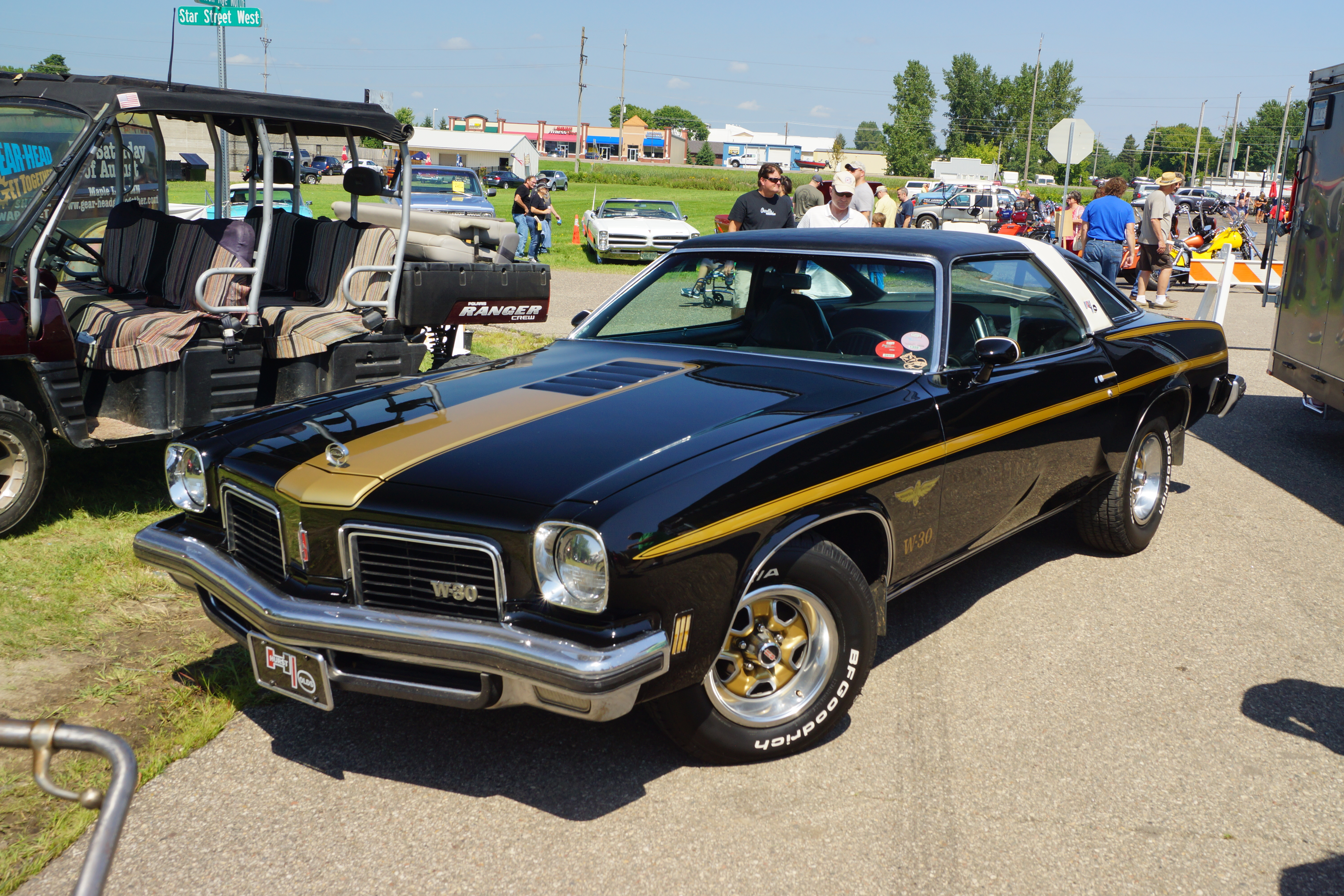
1974 Hurst/Olds festival car

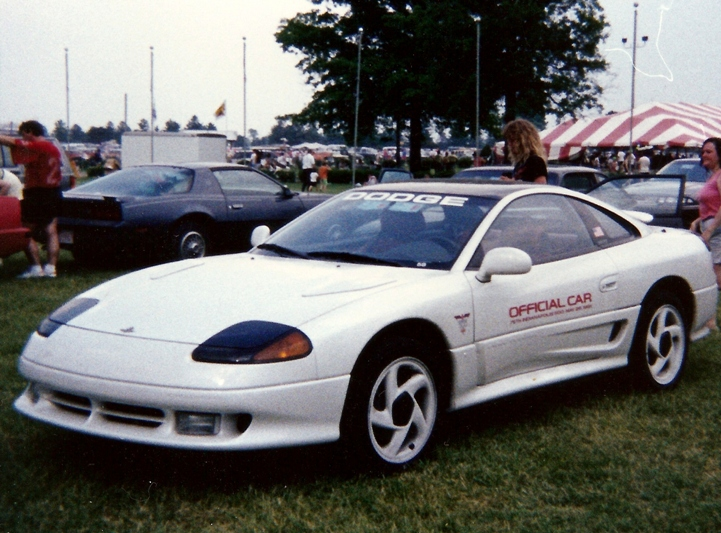
1991 Dodge Stealth "Official Car"

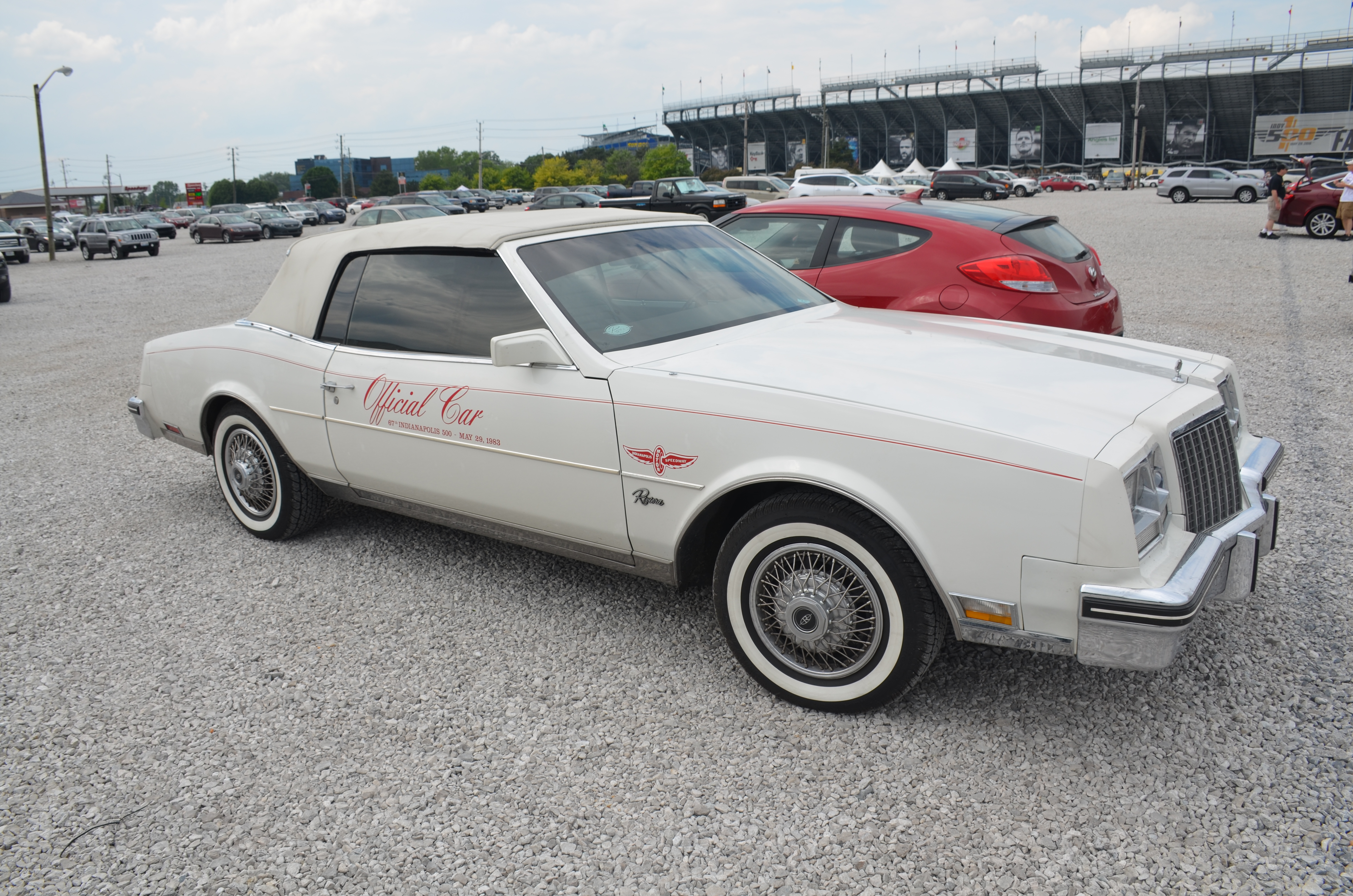
1983 Buick Riviera Festival Car

Starting in the mid-1950s, the auto manufacturer who provided the official pace car started selling replica pace cars to the general public. In many cases, the official on-track pace car was modified from its street-legal counterpart. Strobe lights, roll bars, multi-point harnesses, television camera mounts, two-way communication (for officials), and removing the air conditioning, are among some of the more routine modifications made for the actual pace car. Some official pace cars, however, have undergone extensive performance modifications, including suspension, transmission, or even engine modifications from their production counterpart (the 1990 Chevrolet Beretta is an example of this). Race-duty pace cars may also have the factory fuel tank replaced with a fuel cell, and usually have an on-board fire extinguisher installed. The special edition production replicas available to the public usually come with full paint and "Indy 500" decals, and may be part of a performance package upgrade.

In addition, the track typically is provided with dozens of lower-end ("base model") pace car production replicas (or different makes by the same manufacturer) for use as festival cars throughout the month. Examples of this practice date back to the mid-1920s. The company who provides the pace car also often provides safety trucks for use at the track. For instance, in 1994, the Ford Mustang Cobra was chosen as the primary pace car. Ford Motor Company provided numerous Mustang GTs (a "stripped-down" model) for festival use. In 1996, the Dodge Viper GTS was chosen as the pace car. Rather than providing a fleet of Vipers, Chrysler provided numerous Stratus, Intrepids, and Special Edition Rams for festival use.

The replica pace cars and the festival cars are usually worth significantly less than the actual car used to perform the pace car duties. Few festival cars may actually have been driven on the track. Actual pace cars are rare and most are kept and owned by the Speedway museum and the manufacturers.

Traditionally, the make of the pace car has always been a domestic American brand. In 1991, the Dodge Stealth was originally named the pace car. However, the UAW, along with traditionalists, protested since the Stealth was a captive import built by Mitsubishi in Japan. Shortly before the race, the Stealth was downgraded to be the festival car. The pre-production Dodge Viper RT/10 was substituted on race day.

In 2001 and 2003, trucks were used instead of pace cars. In 2005, a specially restored 1955 Bel Air pace car was commissioned by the Indianapolis Race Committee to celebrate the 50th anniversary of the Chevrolet V-8 engine. Only one car was built and it was displayed and used on the speedway. It differed from the first 1955 track cars in that it was black. The original 1955 Chevrolet pace cars were red and cream two-tone. This car is currently on display at the Auburn Cord Duesenberg Museum in Auburn, Indiana.

Since 2002, Chevrolet has had an exclusive contract with the Speedway to provide the pace car and other official vehicles for the Indianapolis 500. Prior to that, series engine provider Oldsmobile (1997–2001) had a similar arrangement, and provided the pace car three times over a five-year period. Chevrolet has had a contract to provide the pace car for the Brickyard 400 since 1994.

Since 1936, the winner of the race has traditionally been awarded a pace car. In some years, and in most cases for the past several decades, the winner is actually presented with one of the official street-legal pace car replicas.

== Pace cars and drivers ==
=== Pacemakers (1911–1941) ===
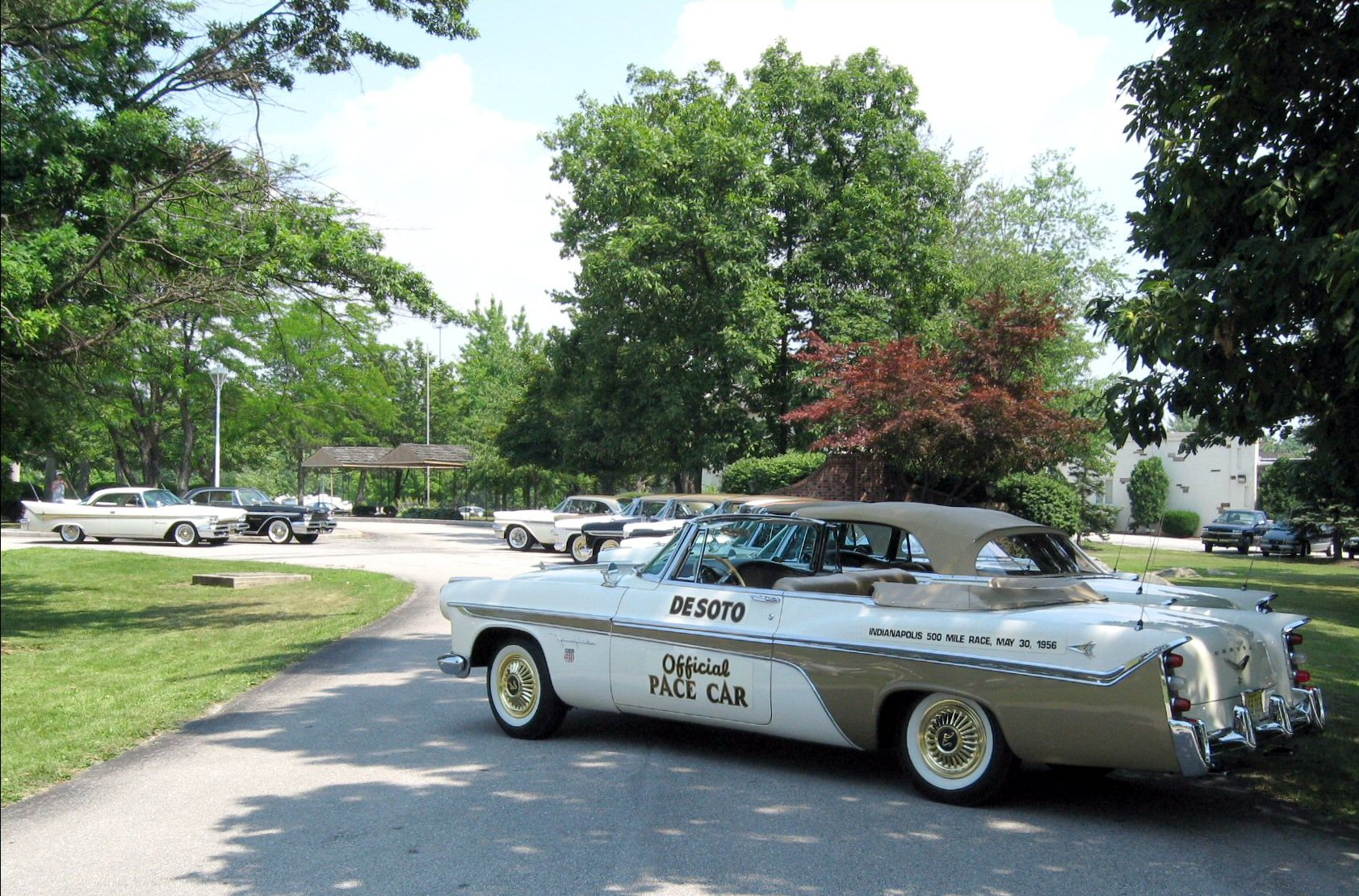
1956 DeSoto

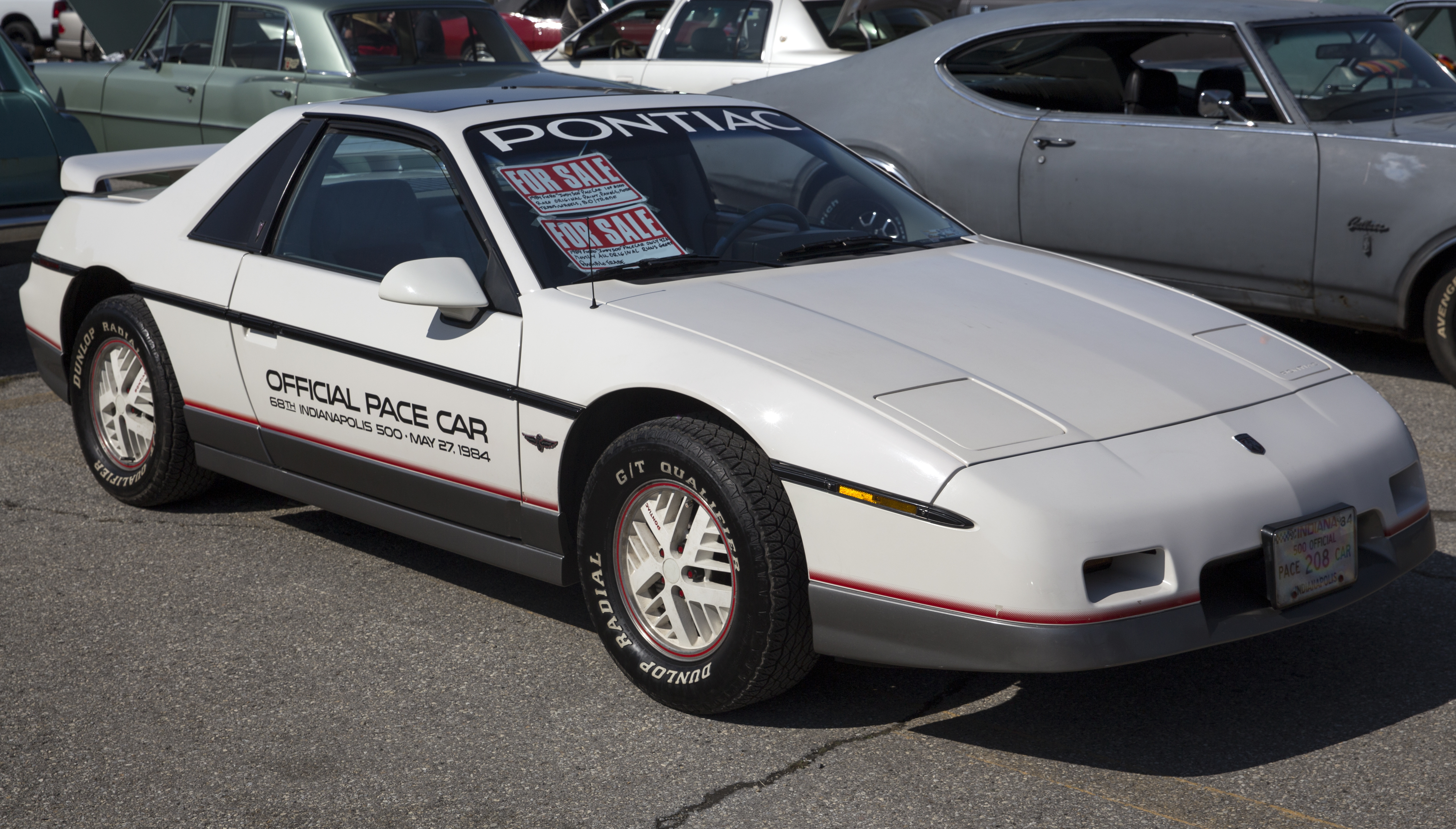
1984 Pontiac Fiero Indy Pace Car replica

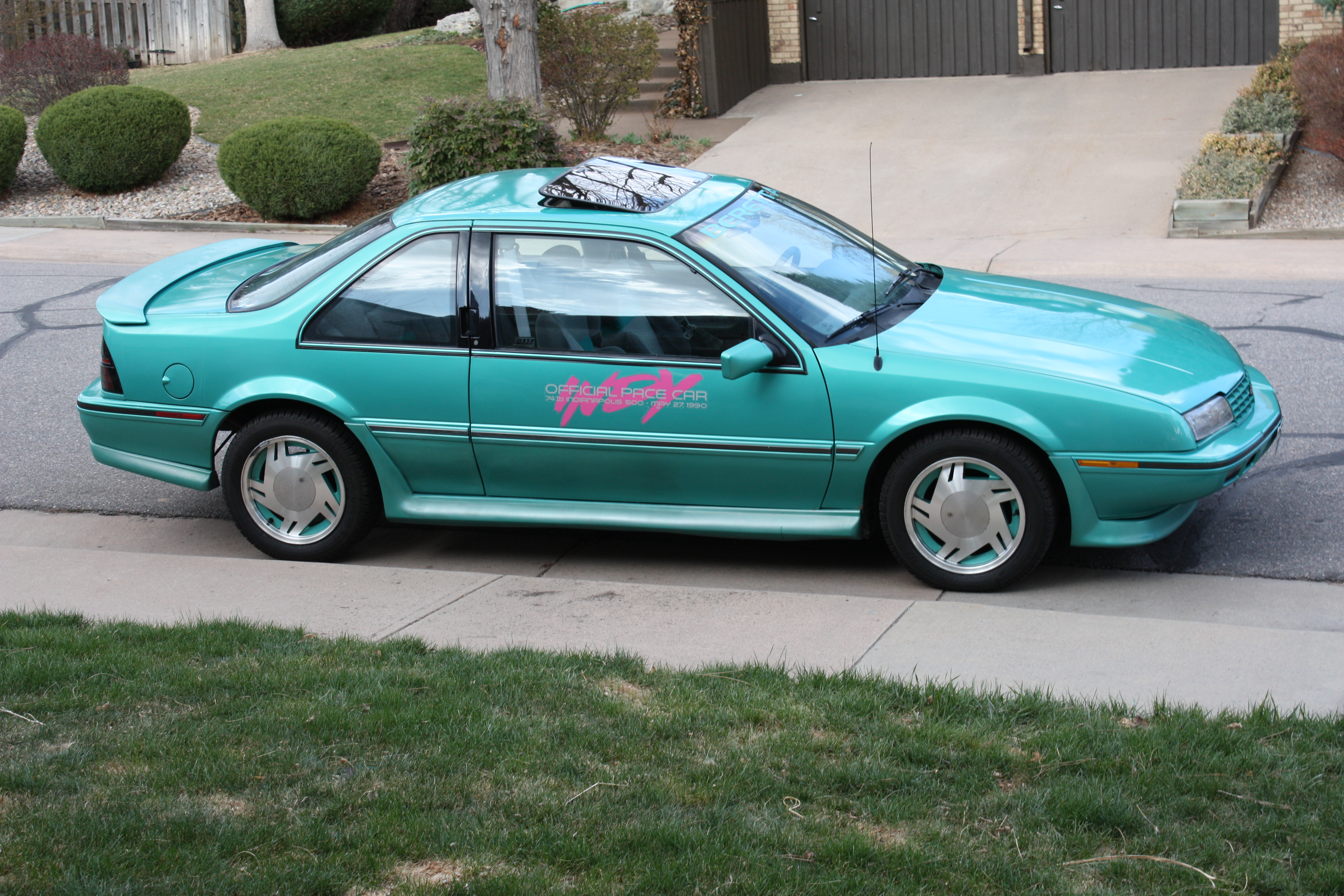
1990 Chevrolet Beretta Festival Car

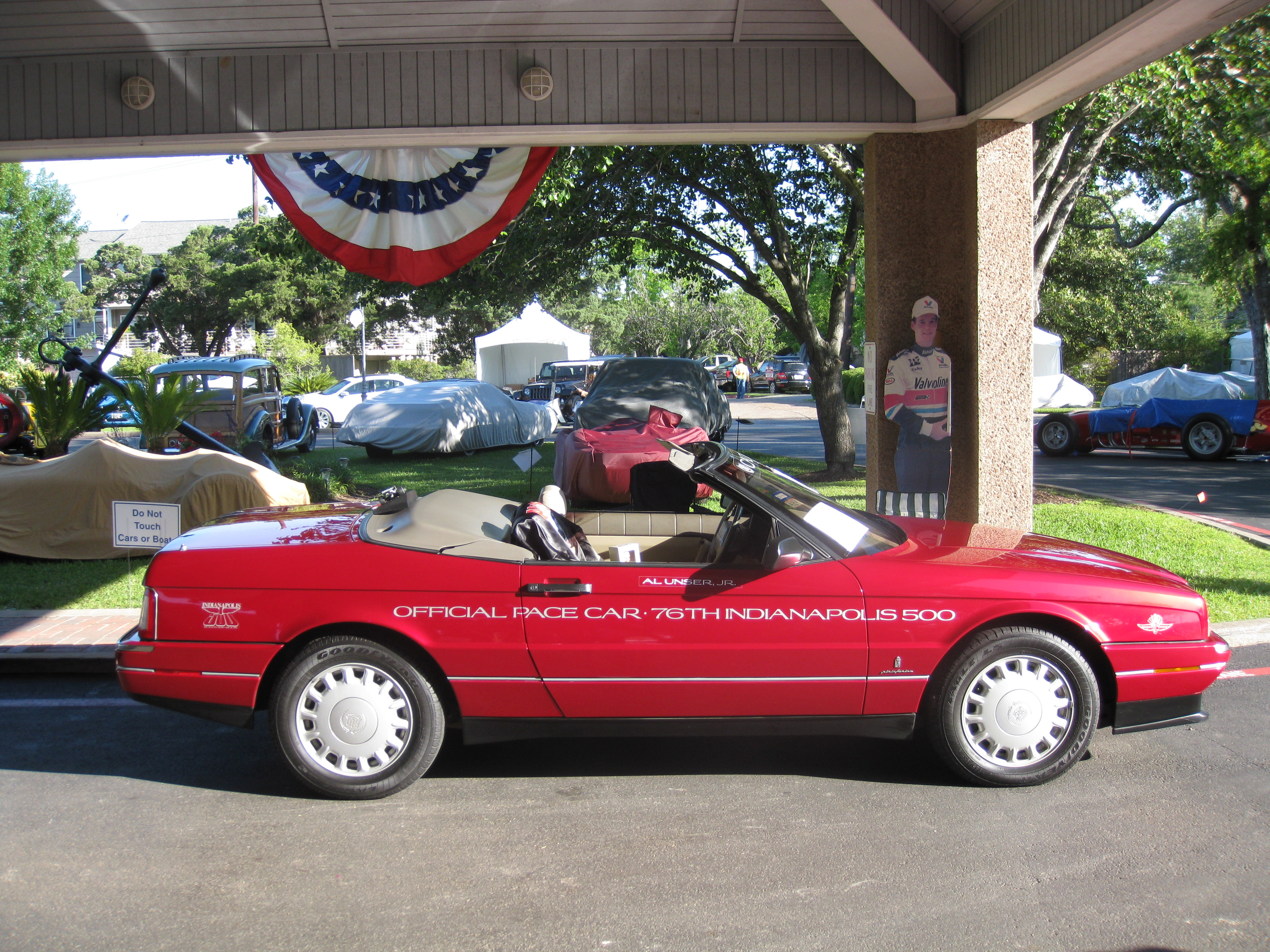
1992 Cadillac Allanté

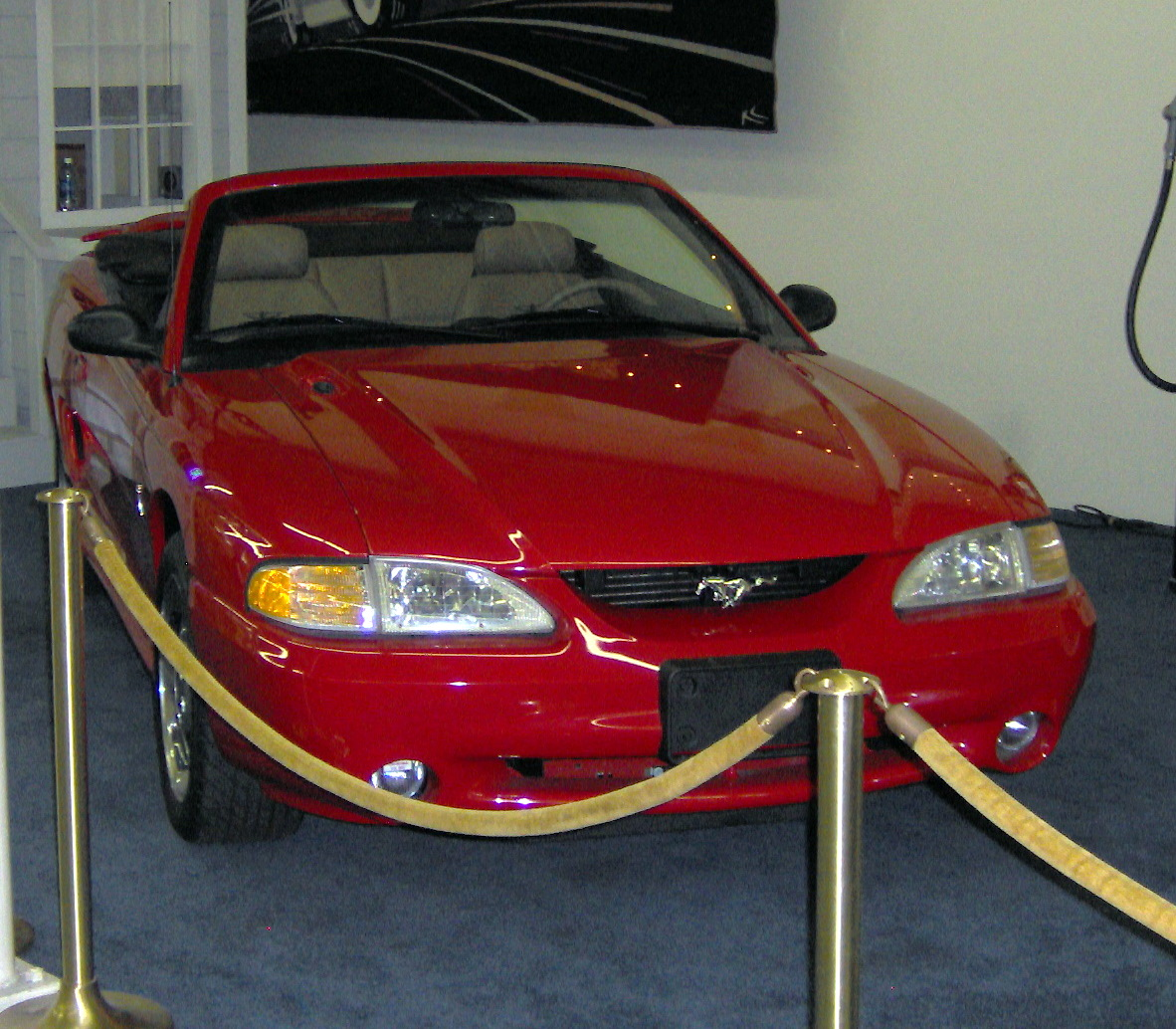
1994 Ford Mustang

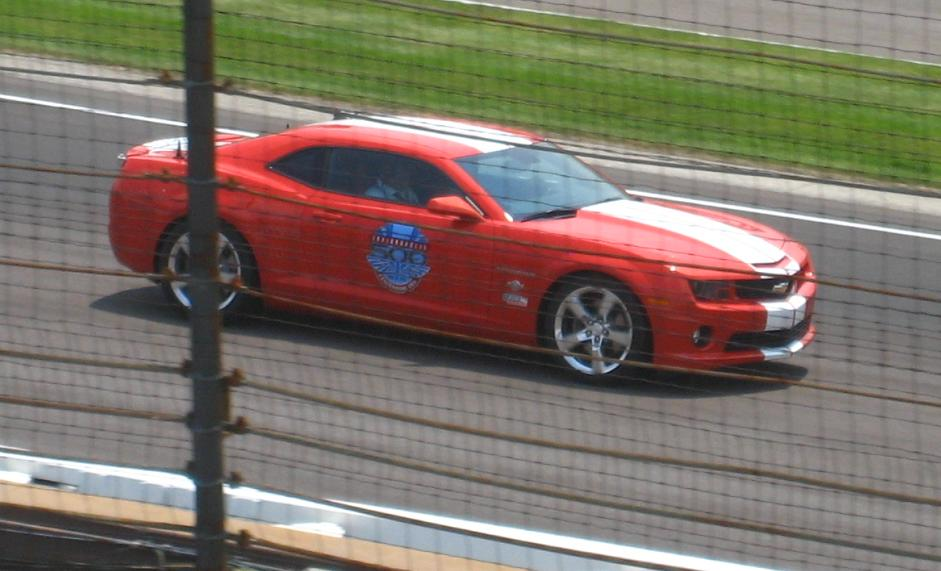
2010 Chevrolet Camaro

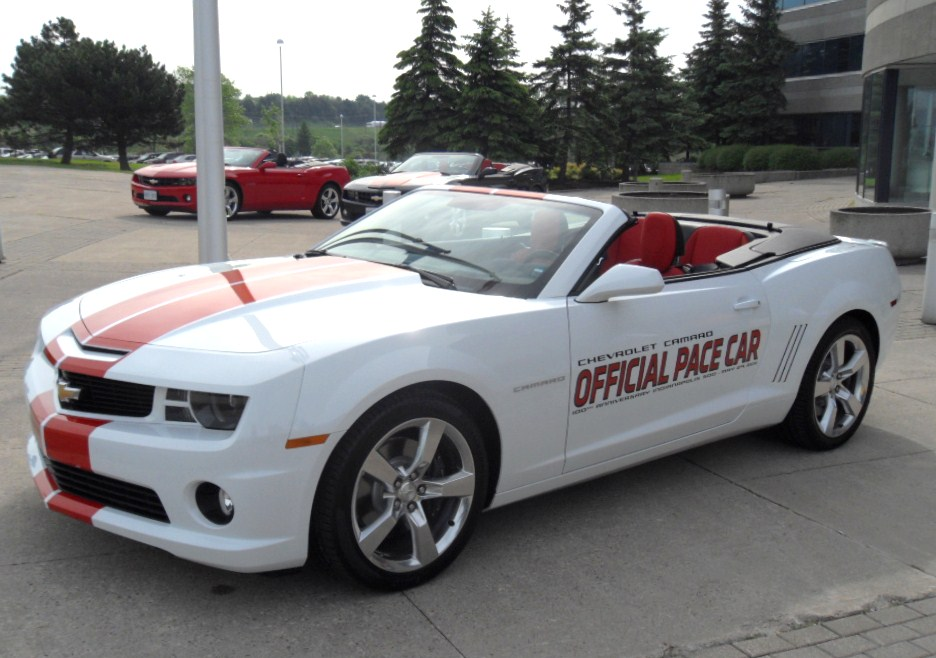
2011 Chevrolet Camaro

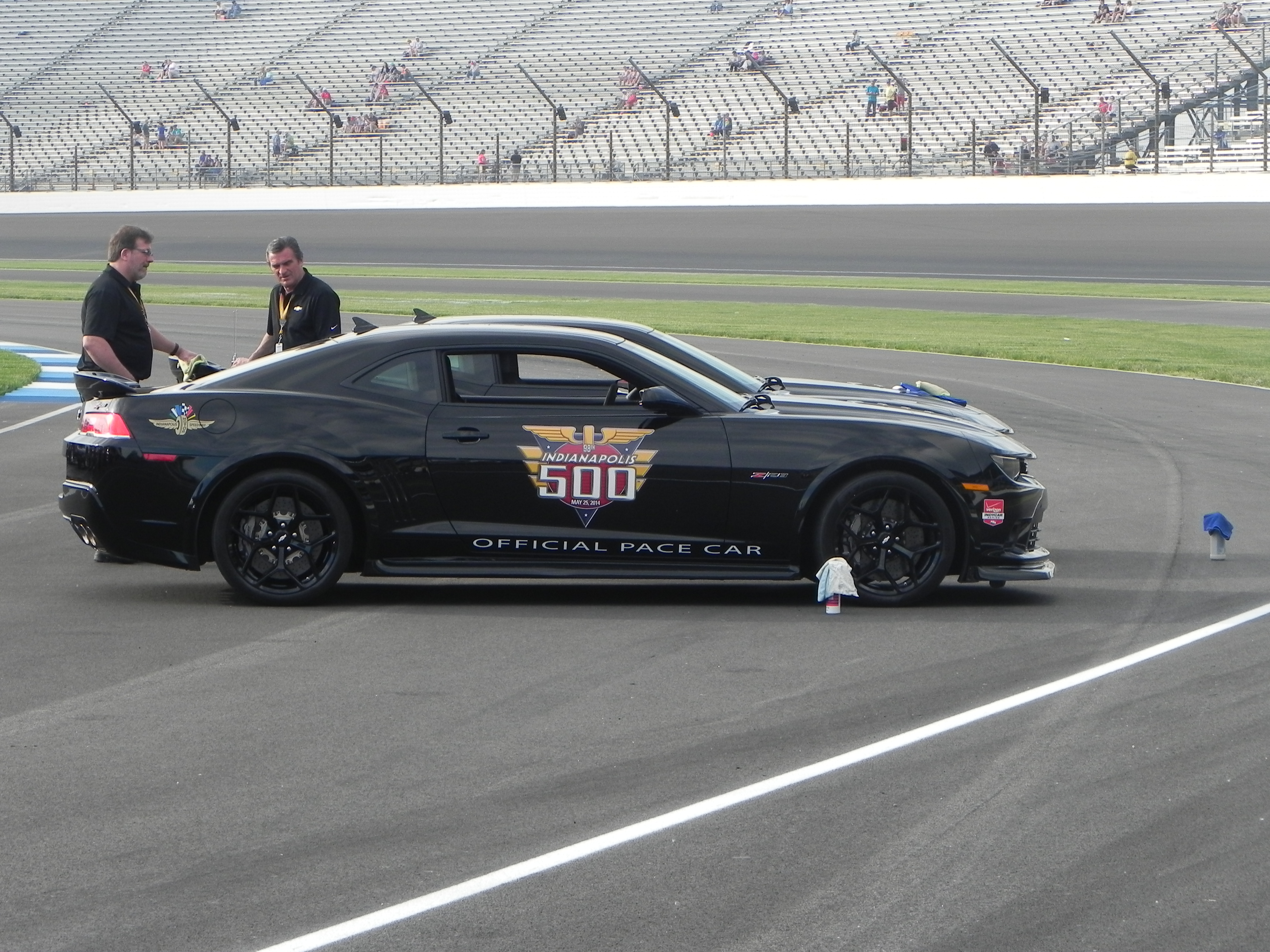
2014 Chevrolet Camaro

| Image | Year | Car | Pacemaker |
|---|---|---|---|
| | 1911 | Stoddard-Dayton | Carl G. Fisher |
| | 1912 | Stutz | Carl G. Fisher |
| | 1913 | Stoddard-Dayton | Carl G. Fisher |
| | 1914 | Stoddard-Dayton | Carl G. Fisher |
| | 1915 | Packard Six Model 5-48 | Carl G. Fisher |
| | 1916 | Premier 6 (Model 6-56) | Frank Smith |
| | 1919 | Packard Twin Six | Jesse G. Vincent |
| | 1920 | Marmon 6 (Model 34) | Barney Oldfield |
| | 1921 | H.C.S. 6 | Harry C. Stutz |
| | 1922 | National Sextet | Barney Oldfield |
| | 1923 | Duesenberg | Fred Duesenberg |
| | 1924 | Cole V8 | Lew Pettijohn |
| | 1925 | Rickenbacker 8 | Eddie Rickenbacker |
| | 1926 | Chrysler Imperial 80 | Louis Chevrolet |
| | 1927 | LaSalle V-8 Series 303 | Willard "Big Boy" Rader |
| | 1928 | Marmon 8 (Model 78) | Joe Dawson |
| | 1929 | Studebaker President Roadster | George Hunt |
| | 1930 | Cord L-29 | Wade Morton |
| | 1931 | Cadillac Series 370 V-12 | "Big Boy" Rader |
| | 1932 | Lincoln Model KB | Edsel Ford |
| | 1933 | Chrysler Imperial Convertible Roadster | Byron Foy |
| | 1934 | LaSalle Model 350 | "Big Boy" Rader |
| | 1935 | Ford Model 48 | Harry Mack |
| | 1936 | Packard 120 | Tommy Milton |
| | 1937 | LaSalle Series 50 | Ralph DePalma |
| | 1938 | Hudson 112 | Stuart Baits |
| | 1939 | Buick Roadmaster 80 | Charles Chayne |
| | 1940 | Studebaker Champion Two Door Sedan | Harry Hartz |
| | 1941 | Chrysler Newport Parade Phaeton | A.B. Couture |

=== Pacemakers (1946–1978) ===
| Image | Year | Car | Pacemaker | Passengers |
|---|---|---|---|---|
| | 1946 | Lincoln Continental V-12 | Henry Ford II | Wilbur Shaw |
| | 1947 | Nash Ambassador | George W. Mason | |
| | 1948 | Chevrolet Fleetmaster Six | Wilbur Shaw | |
| | 1949 | Oldsmobile 88 | Wilbur Shaw | Jack Wolfram |
| | 1950 | Mercury Eight Convertible | Benson Ford | |
| | 1951 | Chrysler New Yorker V8 | David A. Wallace | |
| | 1952 | Studebaker Commander Convertible | P.O. Peterson | |
| | 1953 | Ford Crestline Sunliner | William Clay Ford Sr. | |
| | 1954 | Dodge Royal 500 | William C. Newburg | |
| | 1955 | Chevrolet Bel Air | Thomas H. Keating | Tony Hulman |
| | 1956 | DeSoto Fireflite | L.I. Woolson | Tony Hulman |
| | 1957 | Mercury Turnpike Cruiser | F.C. Reith | Tony Hulman |
| | 1958 | Pontiac Bonneville | Sam Hanks (Note: From 1958 to 1963, retired driver Sam Hanks was named "Director of Racing" for USAC, and assumed the pace car duties. No "celebrity" drivers were used during that period.) | Tony Hulman |
| | 1959 | Buick Electra 225 | Sam Hanks | Tony Hulman |
| | 1960 | Oldsmobile Ninety-Eight | Sam Hanks | Tony Hulman |
| | 1961 | Ford Thunderbird | Sam Hanks | Tony Hulman |
| | 1962 | Studebaker Lark Daytona Convertible | Sam Hanks | Tony Hulman |
| | 1963 | Chrysler 300 | Sam Hanks | Tony Hulman |
| | 1964 | Ford Mustang | Benson Ford | Tony Hulman |
| | 1965 | Plymouth Sport Fury | P.M. Buckminster | Tony Hulman |
| | 1966 | Mercury Comet Cyclone GT | Benson Ford | Tony Hulman, Gus Grissom |
| | 1967 | Chevrolet Camaro | Mauri Rose | Tony Hulman |
| | 1968 | Ford Torino GT | William Clay Ford Sr. | Tony Hulman, Duke Nalon |
| | 1969 | Chevrolet Camaro SS | Jim Rathmann | Tony Hulman, Pete Conrad |
| | 1970 | Oldsmobile 4-4-2 | Rodger Ward | Tony Hulman, Pete Conrad |
| | 1971 | Dodge Challenger | Eldon Palmer | Tony Hulman, John Glenn, Chris Schenkel |
| | 1972 | Hurst/Olds Cutlass | Jim Rathmann | Tony Hulman, Pete Conrad, Chris Schenkel, Bob Draper, Dolly Cole |
| | 1973 | Cadillac Eldorado | Jim Rathmann | Tony Hulman, Alfred Worden, Chris Schenkel, Bob Lund, Dolly Cole |
| | 1974 | Hurst/Olds Cutlass | Jim Rathmann | Tony Hulman, Frank Borman, Chris Schenkel, Bill Kay |
| | 1975 | Buick Century 455 c.i.d. V8 (Note: The car assignments for the 1975 Indianapolis "500" Mile Race had the VIN number for pace car #1 as 4H57H5-H125041 and VIN number for pace car #2 as 4H57H5-H125135. The VIN engine code identifies as a 350 c.i.d (5.7 litre) V8 and was actually the modified 455 c.i.d. (7.5 litre) V8. Additionally, each VIN number for the total of the 55 Buick Century coupe Pace car replicas.) | James Garner | Tony Hulman, Jim Rathmann |
| | 1976 | Buick Century 231 c.i.d. turbo V6 | Marty Robbins | Tony Hulman, Jim Rathmann, Chris Schenkel |
| | 1977 | Oldsmobile Delta 88 | James Garner | Tony Hulman, Jim Rathmann, Chris Schenkel |
| | 1978 | Chevrolet Corvette C3 | Jim Rathmann | |

=== Pace cars (1979–2026) ===
| Image | Year | Car | Driver (Start of the race) | Driver (Caution periods) |
|---|---|---|---|---|
| | 1979 | Ford Mustang | Jackie Stewart | Jim Rathmann |
| | 1980 | Pontiac Trans Am Turbo | Johnnie Parsons | Don Bailey |
| | 1981 | Buick Regal V6 | Duke Nalon | Duke Nalon |
| | 1982 | Chevrolet Camaro Z28 | Jim Rathmann | Don Bailey |
| | 1983 | Buick Riviera Convertible | Duke Nalon | Don Bailey |
| | 1984 | Pontiac Indy Fiero | John Callies | Don Bailey |
| | 1985 | Oldsmobile Cutlass Calais | James Garner | Don Bailey |
| | 1986 | Chevrolet Corvette C4 convertible | Chuck Yeager | Don Bailey |
| | 1987 | Chrysler LeBaron | Carroll Shelby | Don Bailey |
| | 1988 | Oldsmobile Cutlass Supreme | Chuck Yeager | Don Bailey |
| | 1989 | 20th Anniversary Pontiac Trans Am | Bobby Unser | Don Bailey |
| | 1990 | Chevrolet Beretta Convertible | Jim Perkins | Don Bailey |
| | 1991 | Dodge Viper RT/10 | Carroll Shelby | Don Bailey |
| | 1992 | Cadillac Allanté | Bobby Unser | Don Bailey |
| | 1993 | Chevrolet Camaro Z28 | Jim Perkins | Don Bailey |
| | 1994 | Ford Mustang Cobra | Parnelli Jones | Don Bailey |
| | 1995 | Chevrolet Corvette C4 convertible | Jim Perkins | Don Bailey |
| | 1996 | Dodge Viper GTS | Bob Lutz | Don Bailey |
| | 1997 | Oldsmobile Aurora | Johnny Rutherford | Don Bailey |
| | 1998 | Chevrolet Corvette C5 | Parnelli Jones* | Don Bailey |
| | 1999 | Chevrolet Monte Carlo | Jay Leno | Don Bailey |
| | 2000 | Oldsmobile Aurora | Anthony Edwards | Don Bailey |
| | 2001 | Oldsmobile Bravada* | Elaine Irwin Mellencamp | Don Bailey |
| | 2002 | 50th Anniversary Chevrolet Corvette C5 | Jim Caviezel | Joie Chitwood, III |
| | 2003 | Chevrolet SSR* | Herb Fishel | Johnny Rutherford |
| | 2004 | Chevrolet Corvette C5 | Morgan Freeman | Joie Chitwood, III |
| | 2005 | Chevrolet Corvette C6 convertible | General Colin Powell | Joie Chitwood, III |
| | 2006 | Chevrolet Corvette C6 Z06 coupe | Lance Armstrong* | Johnny Rutherford |
| | 2007 | Chevrolet Corvette C6 | Patrick Dempsey | Johnny Rutherford |
| | 2008 | Chevrolet Corvette C6 Z06 E85* | Emerson Fittipaldi | Johnny Rutherford |
| | 2009 | Chevrolet Camaro SS | Josh Duhamel | Johnny Rutherford |
| | 2010 | Chevrolet Camaro SS | Robin Roberts | Johnny Rutherford |
| | 2011 | Chevrolet Camaro | A. J. Foyt* (Mari Hulman George as passenger) | Johnny Rutherford |
| | 2012 | Chevrolet Corvette C6 ZR1 | Guy Fieri | Johnny Rutherford |
| | 2013 | Chevrolet C7 Corvette Stingray | Jim Harbaugh | Johnny Rutherford |
| | 2014 | Chevrolet Camaro Z28 | Dario Franchitti | Johnny Rutherford |
| | 2015 | Chevrolet Corvette Z06 | Jeff Gordon | Johnny Rutherford |
| | 2016 | Chevrolet Camaro | Roger Penske | Johnny Rutherford |
| | 2017 | Chevrolet Corvette Grand Sport | Jeffrey Dean Morgan | Sarah Fisher |
| | 2018 | Chevrolet Corvette ZR1 | Victor Oladipo | Sarah Fisher |
| | 2019 | Chevrolet Corvette Grand Sport | Dale Earnhardt Jr. | Sarah Fisher |
| | 2020 | Chevrolet Corvette Stingray | Mark Reuss | Sarah Fisher |
| | 2021 | Chevrolet Corvette Convertible | Danica Patrick | Sarah Fisher |
| | 2022 | Chevrolet Corvette Z06 | Sarah Fisher | Sarah Fisher |
| | 2023 | Chevrolet Corvette Z06 | Tyrese Haliburton | Sarah Fisher |
| | 2024 | Chevrolet Corvette E-Ray 3LZ | Ken Griffey Jr. | Sarah Fisher |
| | 2025 | Chevrolet Corvette ZR1 | Michael Strahan | Sarah Fisher |
| | 2026 | Chevrolet Corvette ZR1X | Curt Cignetti | Sarah Fisher |

- 1998: Professional golfer Greg Norman was originally selected to drive the pace car in 1998. He participated in testing runs in the early spring. However, Parnelli Jones was named a last-minute substitute after Norman was forced to withdraw because of shoulder surgery.
- 2001 & 2003: Pace truck or SUV
- 2006: This was before doping scandals erased his sporting records in 2011. (See Lance Armstrong doping case.)
- 2008: There were two Chevrolet Corvette pace cars for the 2008 race; a metallic green pace car that runs on E85 driven by Fittipaldi at the start, and a pace car painted to resemble the 1978 pace car that runs on gasoline (used during caution periods)
- 2011: Donald Trump was initially named the driver, but resigned the honor due to speculation about his candidacy in the 2012 presidential race as well as the negative fan reactions against his selection, including a Facebook campaign.

=== Two-seater ===
Starting in 2010, a modified Dallara IR03, converted to a two-seater, has also led the field during the parade and pace lap. Billed as the "Fastest Seat in Sports," it is driven by a former Indy driver, and carries a special passenger. This is featured at many IndyCar Series races.

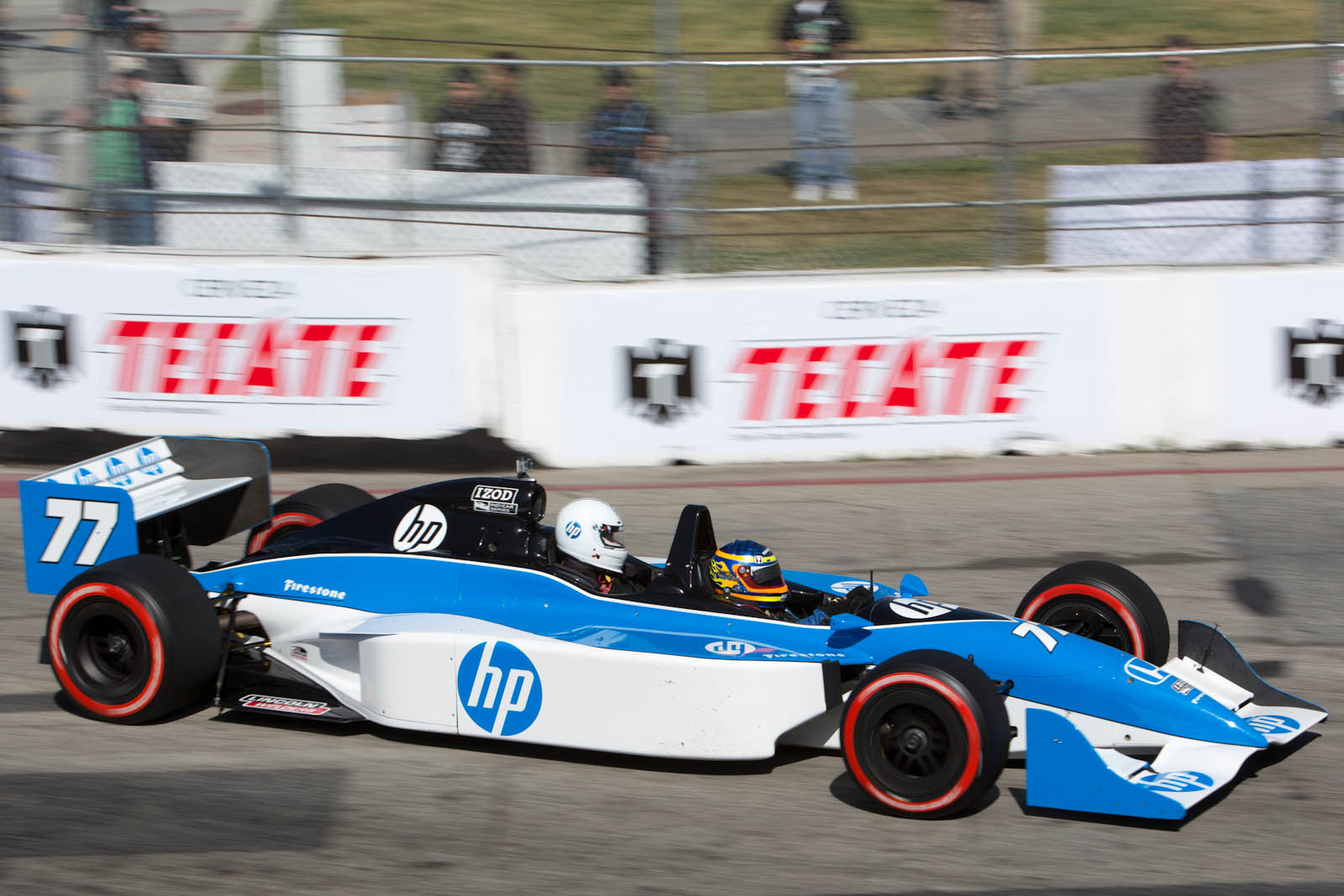
The IndyCar "Two-seater"

| Year | Driver | Passenger | Notes |
|---|---|---|---|
| 2010 | Michael Andretti | Mark Wahlberg | Mario Andretti coached from the pits |
| 2011 | Mario Andretti | Sgt. Latseen Benson | Benson was a retired Iraq War veteran (U.S. Army) |
| 2012 | Mario Andretti | Thomas Patton | Contest winner |
| 2013 | Mario Andretti | Cpl. Barry Walton | Wounded veteran (U.S. Marines) |
| 2014 | Mario Andretti | Gracie Gold | |
| 2015 | Mario Andretti | Adam Carolla | |
| 2016 | Mario Andretti | Lady Gaga | Keith Urban withdrew due to back injury |
| 2017 | Mario Andretti | Zedd | |
| 2018 | Mario Andretti | Nick Cannon | |
| 2019 | Mario Andretti | Matthew Daddario | |
| 2020 | Mario Andretti | Michael Andretti | Marco Andretti qualified for the pole position |
| 2025 | Jimmie Johnson | Tom Brady | |
| 2026 | Jimmie Johnson | Alec Pierce | |

== Multiple appearances ==
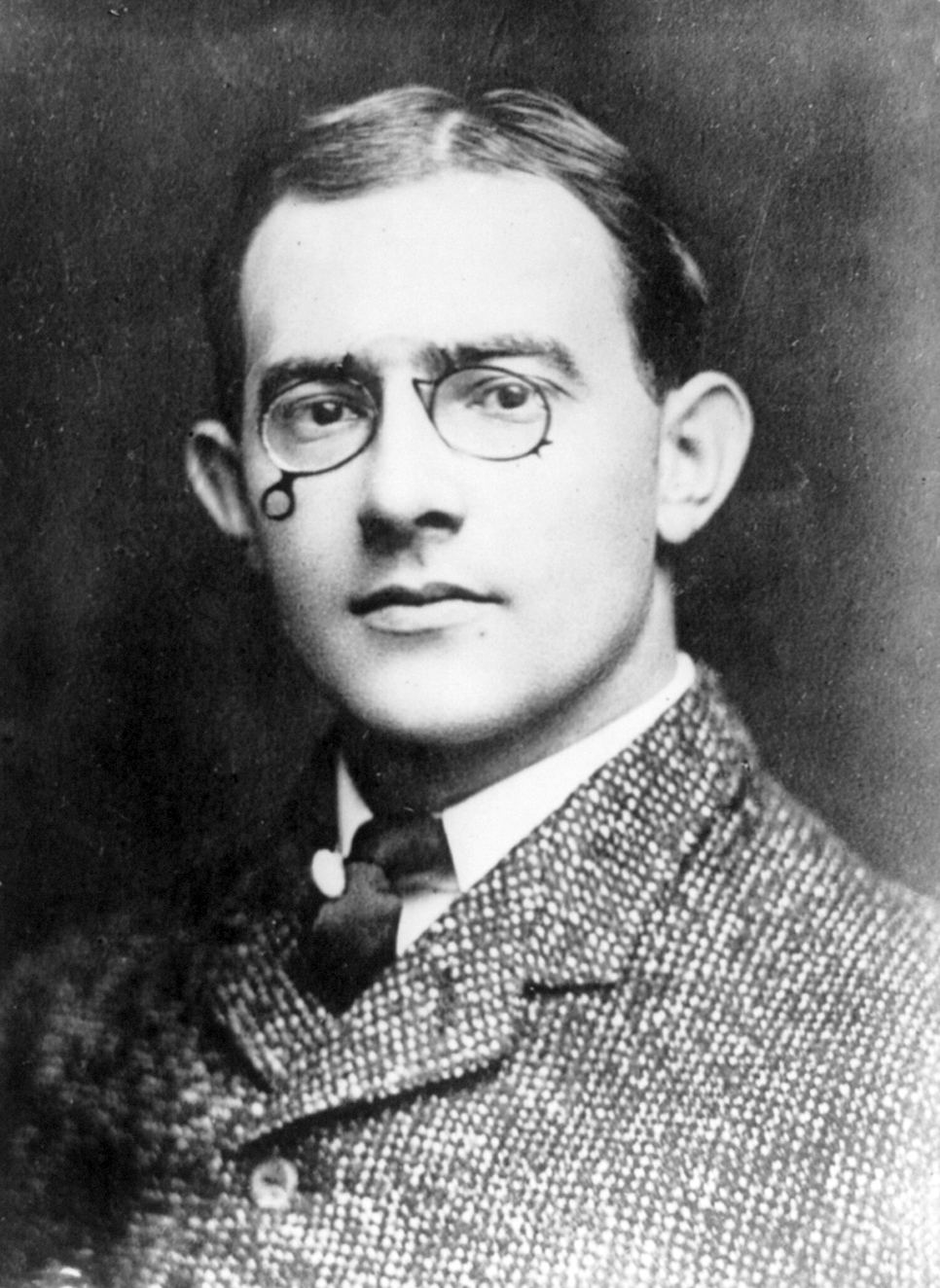
Carl G. Fisher

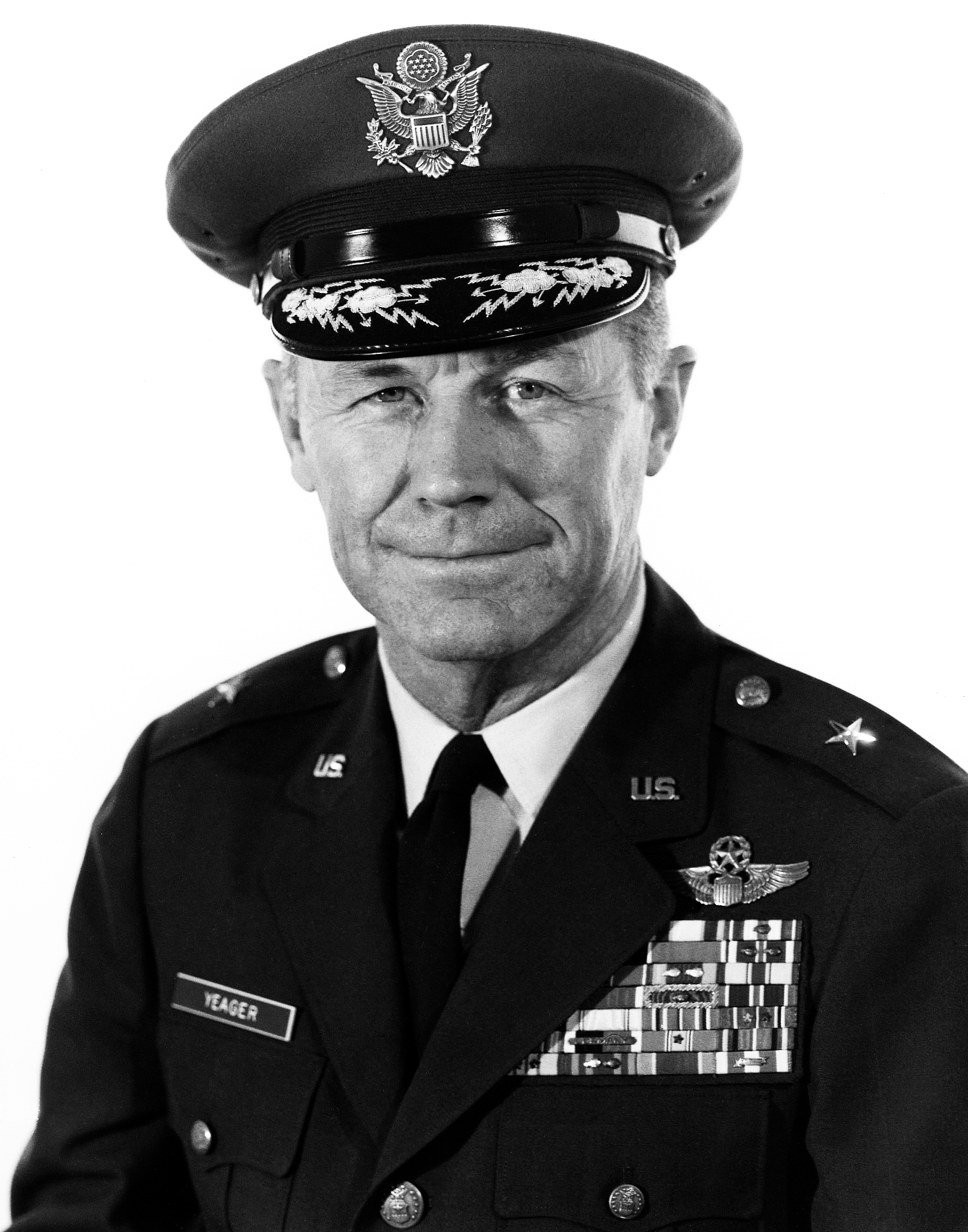
Chuck Yeager

=== By driver (for start of the race, not caution periods only) ===
| Appearances | Driver | Races |
|---|---|---|
| 6 | Sam Hanks | 1958, 1959, 1960, 1961, 1962, 1963 |
| 6 | Jim Rathmann | 1969, 1972, 1973, 1974, 1978, 1982 |
| 5 | Carl G. Fisher | 1911, 1912, 1913, 1914, 1915 |
| 3 | "Big Boy" Rader | 1927, 1931, 1934 |
| 3 | Benson Ford | 1950, 1964, 1966 |
| 3 | James Garner | 1975, 1977, 1985 |
| 3 | Jim Perkins | 1990, 1993, 1995 |
| 2 | Barney Oldfield | 1920, 1922 |
| 2 | Wilbur Shaw | 1948, 1949 |
| 2 | William Clay Ford | 1953, 1968 |
| 2 | Duke Nalon | 1981, 1983 |
| 2 | Chuck Yeager | 1986, 1988 |
| 2 | Carroll Shelby | 1987, 1991 |
| 2 | Bobby Unser | 1989, 1992 |
| 2 | Parnelli Jones | 1994, 1998 |

=== By car ===
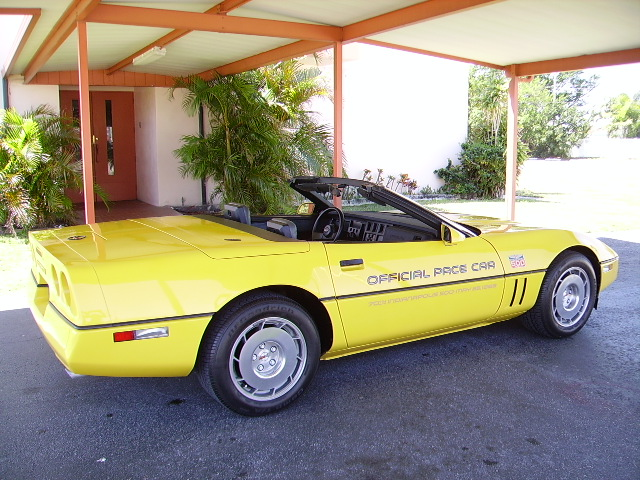
1986 Chevrolet Corvette

The process of varying the selection across different models, which existed from 1911 through 2001, has been abandoned since 2002, with all pace cars exclusively provided by the Chevrolet marque since that year.

| Appearances | Car | Races |
|---|---|---|
| 22 | Chevrolet Corvette | 1978, 1986, 1995, 1998, 2002, 2004, 2005, 2006, 2007, 2008, 2012, 2013, 2015, 2017, 2018, 2019, 2020, 2021, 2022, 2023, 2024, 2025 |
| 9 | Chevrolet Camaro | 1967, 1969, 1982, 1993, 2009, 2010, 2011, 2014, 2016 |
| 3 | Stoddard-Dayton | 1911, 1913, 1914 |
| 3 | Packard | 1915, 1919, 1936 |
| 3 | LaSalle | 1927, 1934, 1937 |
| 3 | Ford Mustang | 1964, 1979, 1994 |
| 2 | Chrysler Imperial | 1926, 1933 |
| 2 | Hurst/Olds Cutlass | 1972, 1974 |
| 2 | Buick Century | 1975, 1976 |
| 2 | Pontiac Trans Am | 1980, 1989 |
| 2 | Dodge Viper | 1991, 1996 |
| 2 | Oldsmobile Aurora | 1997, 2000 |

=== By manufacturer ===
A list of manufacturers and the frequency in which they either provided official pace cars, or one of their vehicles were selected to pace the Indianapolis 500. This list counts all subsidiary marques, current and defunct, from each manufacturer along with vehicles made by a company that later merged with another on the list.

The process of varying the selection across different manufacturers, which existed from 1911 through 1996, has been abandoned since 1997, with all pace cars exclusively provided by General Motors since that year.

| Manufacturer | Official pace cars fielded | Notes |
|---|---|---|
| General Motors | 52 | |
| Chrysler | 13 | Includes the National Sextet, Nash Ambassador and Hudson 112, and the former Chrysler Corporation, all of which were later merged into Fiat Chrysler Automobiles. The 1971 Dodge Challenger was provided by the Indianapolis area Dodge dealers, not by Chrysler Corporation, and driven by Eldon Palmer of Palmer Dodge in Indianapolis. |
| Ford | 11 | |
| Studebaker | 6 | Including Packard vehicles |
| Stoddard-Dayton | 3 | |
| Harry C. Stutz | 2 | Including the 1912 Stutz, made during his ownership of Stutz Motor Company and the H.C.S. 6 of 1921 |
