= Kere =

Kere may refer to:

== People ==
- Diébédo Francis Kéré, architect
- Johnson Kere, Solomon Islands sprinter
- Joy Kere, Solomon Islands diplomat
- Kere Johanson, New Zealand softball player and coach
- Mahamoudou Kéré (born 1982), Burkinabé football player

== Places ==
- Kèrè, Benin
- Kere, India

== Other ==
- Kere language
- Kere (famine), recurrent famine in southern Madagascar
