= Joie Ray =

Joie Ray is the name of:

- Joie Ray (runner) (1894–1978), US American middle and long-distance runner
- Joie Ray (racing driver) (1923-2007), US American open-wheel and stock-car racer
