= Gioiosa =

Ginestra may refer to:

- Gioiosa Ionica, town and comune in Italy in the province of Reggio Calabria, region of Calabria
- Gioiosa Marea, municipality in the Metropolitan City of Messina in the Italian region of Sicily

== See also ==
- Gioia (disambiguation)
- La Joyosa
- La Vila Joiosa
