= Chester Joie =

American slave

Chester Joie was an enslaved African American who lived in Boston, Massachusetts, in the late 18th century. Alongside Peter Bestes, Sambo Freeman, and Felix Holbrook, who were also enslaved, Joie petitioned the Massachusetts legislature asking for his freedom and declaring that those who aided him would be taking an honorable position against those trying to enslave them. Joie said that he understood colonialist's desire for political and religious freedom. He requested a position where he could earn the money to buy his freedom and return to Africa. He intended to obtain his freedom through peaceful, lawful means. He wrote: "We ask you for relief, which as a man, we have a right to do."

== Background ==
The four enslaved men, including Joie, authored a letter to the provincial legislature in Massachusetts on April 20, 1773.

Sir, The efforts made by the legiſlative of this province in their laſt ſeſſions to free themselves from ſlavery, gave us, who are in that deplorable ſtate, a high degree of ſatisfaction. We expect great things from men who have made ſuch a noble stand againſt the deſigns of their fellow-men to enſlave them. . .

We do not pretend to dictate to you Sir, or to the honorable Aſſembly, of which you are a member: We acknowledge our obligations to you for what you have already done, but as the people of this province ſeem to be actuated by the principles of equity and juſtice, we cannot but expect your houſe will again take our deplorable caſe into ſerious consideration, and give us that ample relief which, as men, we have a natural right to.

But ſince the wiſe and righteous governor of the univerſe, has permitted our fellow men to make us ſlaves, we bow in ſubmiſſion to him, and determine to behave in ſuch a manner, as that we may have reaſon to expect the divine approbation of, and aſſiſtance in, our peaceable and lawful attempts to gain our freedom.

We are willing to ſubmit to ſuch regulations and laws, as may be made relative to us, until we leave the province, which we determine to do as ſoon as we can from our joynt labors procure money to tranſport ourſelves to some part of the coaſt of Africa, where we propoſe a ſettlement. We are very deſirous that you ſhould have inſtructions relative to us, from your town, therefore we pray you to communicate this letter to them and aſk this favor for us.

In behalf of our fellow ſlaves in this province,

And by order of their Committee,

PETER BESTES,

SAMBO FREEMAN,

FELIX HOLBROOK,

CHESTER JOIE.

For the REPRESENTATIVE of the town of Thompson

Note: The letter employs the long-s.
