= Joyful =

Joyful may refer to:

- A feeling of joy
- Joyful (Ayo album), a 2006 album by Ayo
- Joyful, a 1969 album by Orpheus
- Joyful, a 2019 song by X Ambassadors
- "Joyful" (song), a 2021 song by Dante Bowe
- Joyful, California, former settlement near Bakersfield, California
