= Joyful, California =

Former settlement and vegetarian colony in Kern County, California

Coordinates: 35.2983°N 119.0742°W

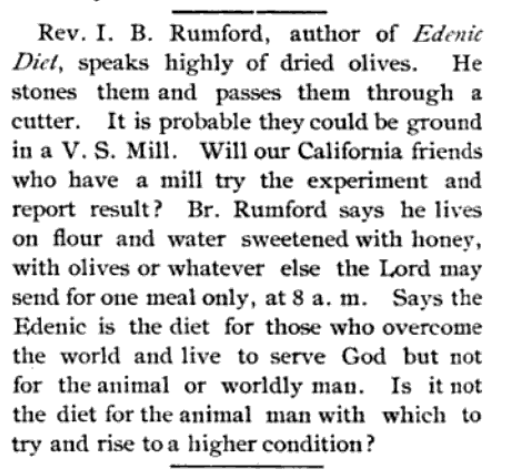
Magazine article about Isaac B. Rumford, 1897

Joyful is a former settlement and vegetarian colony in Kern County, California, United States. It was located 2 miles (3.2 km) southwest of Bakersfield, where Pennsylvania Lane now joins Ashe Road, just north of Panama Lane.

== History ==
Californian fruit farmer Isaac B. Rumford and his wife Sara converted to a raw food vegetarian diet in 1881. They advocated an "Edenic Diet" in which all animal foods were forbidden apart from honey. They held the view that "cooking destroys the vitality of the food, besides being a waste of labor and of time; it makes a slave of the one who cooks and shortens life."

Joyful was founded by Rumford and his wife in early 1884 as a Utopian colony under the auspices of the Association of Brotherly Cooperation. Joyful was located on the bank of Panama Slough, wetland adjacent to the Kern River that has been dry since before 1967. Joyful was a vegetarian colony in which members followed a way of life influenced by the Biblical Adam and Eve before the Fall. Members would eat a raw vegetarian diet of almonds, fruit juice, grated apples, raisins and a ground mix of oats and wheat called grainia. They opposed cooking food as they believed it reduced nutritional value. Rumford and his wife founded the newspaper, Joyful News. The Joyful post office operated from 1883 to 1884, when the colony was abandoned. Although the other members abandoned the colony, Rumford continued to work as a fruit farmer with his family. In 1902 at age 68, Rumford wrote that his raw vegetarian diet consisted of starch foods such as dry flour with fruits and nuts.
