= Felix Holbrook =

Felix Holbrook was a Black activist born in Africa but lived in Boston and Rhode Island during the mid- to late-eighteenth century. A slave for more than 25 years, he was a staunch advocate of abolitionism. He married his wife, Susannah in 1772, when he was 29. He wrote a petition, released in 1773, requesting freedom for himself and for all enslaved people. He continued this practice throughout 1774 and eventually gained freedom for himself in 1775. He was a patriot, supporting freedom for all citizens. He disliked the British government due to the time he spent enslaved, a practice which they not only allowed but profited from. He placed an ad in a Boston newspaper asking for his freedom, and those who would aid him would be taking an honorable position against those trying to enslave them. Holbrook said that he understood colonialist's desire for political and religious freedom. He requested a position where he could earn the money to buy his freedom and return to Africa. His intention was to obtain his freedom through peaceful, lawful means. He wrote: “We ask you for relief, which as a man, we have a right to do”.
