= Gioia =

Gioia can refer to:

== Given names ==
- Gioia Bruno
- Gioia Marconi Braga

== Surnames ==
- Anthony H. Gioia
- Carl Daniel Gioia
- Dana Gioia
- Eric Gioia
- Flavio Gioia
- Gaetano Gioia (1764 or 1768-1826) – Italian dancer and choreographer (Teatro di San Carlo and La Scala)
- John Gioia
- Kenny Gioia
- Melchiorre Gioia
- Raffaele Gioia (1757-1805) - Italian painter from San Massimo (Province of Campobasso)
- Ted Gioia

== Toponyms ==
- Gioia del Colle
- Gioia dei Marsi
- Gioia (Milan Metro)
- Gioia Sannitica
- Gioia Tauro

== Other ==
- Gioia (magazine), an Italian weekly women's fashion magazine published between 1937 and 2018

== See also ==
- Gioiosa (disambiguation)
