= Joie Ray (racing driver) =

American racing driver

Joseph Reynolds "Joie" Ray Jr. (September 29, 1923 – April 13, 2007) was an American open-wheel and stock-car racer.

Ray was born in Louisville, Kentucky. In 1947, Ray was the first African American licensed by the American Automobile Association. Ray raced primarily in the Midwest and raced in AAA, USAC, CSRA and other organizations, but despite many sources to the contrary, was not the first African-American to race in NASCAR's top series. The Joie Ray who started 25th in the 1952 Daytona race in a Henry J was white, from Portland, Oregon and little is known about him. They were two different men.

Ray died in Louisville of pneumonia on April 13, 2007, at age 83.

Ray was posthumously inducted into the National Sprint Car Hall of Fame in 2023.
