= Joie Chitwood III =

American racing driver

- Born: November 26, 1971 (age 54)
- Education: University of Florida; University of South Florida
- Occupation: Business executive
- Family: Joie Chitwood

Joie Chitwood III (born November 26, 1971) is Vice President of Corporate Development for the Arnold Palmer Group. He was formerly CEO of International Speedway Corporation, president of Daytona International Speedway, and prior to that president of the Indianapolis Motor Speedway. He is the grandson of former Indy 500 driver and businessman Joie Chitwood.

== Biography ==
Chitwood attended prestigious Tampa Jesuit High School, studied business administration and finance at the University of Florida, later earning his masters of business administration degree at the University of South Florida. Prior to his appointment, he had worked for Daytona Speedway's parent company, International Speedway Corporation, since 2009.
