= Joy Kere =

Solomon Islands diplomat

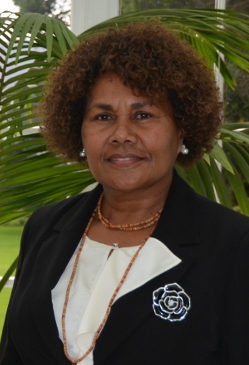
Kere in 2014

Joy Kiriau Kere is a diplomat from the Solomon Islands. In 2014 she was appointed the first Solomon Islands High Commissioner to New Zealand, becoming the country's first woman to head a foreign mission abroad. Her term ended in 2020.

== Life ==
Kere was the Permanent Secretary to the Ministry of Foreign Affairs and External Trade prior to her appointment as High Commissioner.
