= Harley (given name) =

- Pronunciation: hahr-lee
- Gender: Unisex
- Language: English
- Name day: June 26, November 26 (disputed)

Origin
- Language: Old English
- Origin: Combination of hara and lēah
- Meaning: "hare's meadow"
- Region of origin: England

Other names
- Variant forms: Harlee, Harleigh
- Related names: Harlow, Hal

Harley is a unisex given name. The name is derived from the Old English words hara meaning hare, and lēah, meaning wood or clearing and meadow in later development of the language. The name Harley means "hare's meadow".

Harley first became popular in the year 1880, where it was the 180th most popular masculine given name in the United States, the name first became popular as a feminine given name in 1991, and became the 668th most popular feminine given name during that year.

== Academics ==
- Harley Flanders (1925–2013), American mathematician
- Harley Rutledge (1926–2006), American physics professor and ufologist

== Artists ==
- Harley Parker (1915–1992), Canadian artist, designer, curator, professor and scholar
- Harley Schwadron, American cartoonist
- Harley Refsal, American artist and woodcarver

== Performers ==
- Harley Allen (1956–2011), American country singer and songwriter
- Harley Alexander-Sule (born 1991), English singer in Rizzle Kicks
- Harley Bird (born 2001), English actress and voice actress, best known for providing the voice of Peppa Pig from 2007 to 2020
- Harley Brinsfield, American radio personality and host of The Harley Show
- Harley Cross (born 1978), American film and television actor
- Harley Flanagan (born 1968), musician and member of the 1980s hardcore punk band Cro-Mags
- Harley Granville-Barker (1877–1946), English actor, director, producer, critic and playwright
- Harley Jane Kozak (born 1957), American actress and author
- Harley Morenstein (born 1985), Canadian YouTuber and host of Epic Meal Time
- Harley Quinn Smith (born 1999), American actress and musician
- Harley Edward Streten (born 1991), Australian DJ known professionally as Flume
- Harley Venton (born 1953), American actor

== Politicians ==
- Harley Desjarlais, Canadian regional Métis leader
- Harley Frank, Canadian First Nations leader
- Harley M. Jacklin (1889–1970), American politician
- Harley M. Kilgore (1893–1956), United States Senator from West Virginia
- Harley E. Knox (1899–1956), American independent politician
- Harley A. Martin (1880–1951), American politician
- Harley Orrin Staggers (1907–1991), American politician
- Harley O. Staggers Jr. (born 1951), American politician

== Sportspeople ==
- Harley Boss (1908–1964) a Major League Baseball first baseman
- Harley Dillinger (1894–1959), American Major League Baseball pitcher
- Harley Hisner (1926–2015), Major League Baseball pitcher
- Harley Lewis (born 1971), American professional wrestler
- Harley Marques Silva (born 1975), Brazilian beach volleyball player
- Harley McCollum (1916–1984), American football tackle
- Harley Payne (1868–1935), American Major League Baseball pitcher
- Harley Sewell (1931–2011), American football guard
- Harley Race (1943–2019), American professional wrestler and promoter
- Harley Roberts (1912–1989), English cricketer and amateur golfer
- Harley Windsor (born 1996), Australian ice skater

== Others ==
- Harley H. Christy (1870–1950), United States Navy vice admiral
- Harley Earl (1894–1969), car designer and coachbuilder, the first styling chief at General Motors
- Harley Hotchkiss (1927–2011) Canadian businessman
- Harley Pasternak (born 1974), Canadian personal trainer, public speaker and author
- Harley Peyton, American television producer and writer
- Harley O. Teets (1906–1957), American law enforcement official and warden of San Quentin State Prison

== Fictional characters ==
- Harley Hartwell, a teenage detective from the Case Closed/Detective Conan anime
- Harley Keener, a character in Iron Man 3 and the Marvel Cinematic Universe
- Harley Quinn, a DC Comics character who first appeared in Batman: The Animated Series in September 1992
- Harley Warren, in H. P. Lovecraft's story "The Statement of Randolph Carter"

== See also ==
- Harley (disambiguation)
- Harley (surname)
