= Arlequin =

Arlequin may refer to:

- Harlequin, also spelled Arlequin, a comic servant character
- Arlequin (band), a Japanese rock band
- Arlequin (software), population genetics software
- L'Arlequin, a cinema in Paris
- Los Arlequíns, Mexican pro-wrestlers
- Arlequin, Pièce Caractèristique Pour Clarinette Seule, by Louis Cahuzac
- Cinysca arlequin (C. arlequin) a species of sea snail

== See also ==
- Arlequinus, a genus of frogs
- Harlequin (disambiguation)
