= Harlequin (disambiguation) =

Harlequin is a comic servant character from the Italian commedia dell'arte.

Harlequin may also refer to:

== Arts and entertainment ==
=== Fictional characters ===
- Harlequin (DC Comics), the name of four clown-themed characters
- Harlequin (The Seven Deadly Sins), or King, in the manga series
- Harlequin, in Assassin's Creed: Brotherhood

=== Music ===
- Harlequin (Lady Gaga album), 2024
- Harlequin (Dave Grusin and Lee Ritenour album), 1985
- Harlequin (band), a Canadian rock group
- "Harlequin", a song by Audience on thec 1969 album Audience (album)
- "Harlequin", a song by Genesis on the 1971 album Nursery Cryme
- "Harlequin", a by The Hollies on the 1979 album Five Three One - Double Seven O Four
- "Harlequin", a song by Violet Chachki on the 2015 EP Gagged
- The Harlequins (Dartmouth College), a student music production group

=== Novels ===
- Harlequin (Cornwell novel), by Bernard Cornwell, 2000
- Harlequin, a Warhammer novel by Ian Watson (author), 1994
- Harlequin (West novel), by Morris West, 1974
- The Harlequin (novel), by Laurell K. Hamilton, 2007

=== Other uses in arts and entertainment ===
- Harlequin (Picasso), a 1913 painting
- Harlequin (1915), a painting by Picasso
- Harlequin (film), a 1980 Australian fantasy thriller
- Harlequin (video game), 1992
- Harlequin (Shadowrun), a 1990 role-playing game book
- Harlequin, one of the three figures in Pablo Picasso's painting Three Musicians

== Businesses and organisations ==
- Harlequin Enterprises, a publishing company
  - List of Harlequin Romance novels
- Harlequin (software company), a defunct British technology business
- Harlequin Games, a play-by-mail game moderator

== Science ==
- 'Harlequin', a cultivar of Berberis thunbergii, a flowering plant
- Harlequin rabbit
- Harmonia axyridis, or harlequin, a ladybird
- Taxila haquinus, or harlequin, a butterfly

== Sports ==
=== Rugby teams ===
- Aberavon Quins RFC, a rugby union club in Wales
- Cardiff Harlequins RFC, a rugby union club in Wales
- Dallas Harlequins R.F.C., in the United States
- Hamilton Harlequins, in New Zealand
- Harlequin Amateurs, an amateur rugby union club
- Harlequin F.C., a rugby union club in London, England
  - Harlequins Women
- Harlequin Rugby Club, in Melbourne, Australia
- Harlequins Rugby League, now London Broncos
- Hawick Harlequins RFC, a rugby union club in Scotland
- Hobart Harlequins Rugby Union Club, in Australia
- Kenya Harlequin F.C., in Kenya
- Maesteg Harlequins RFC, a rugby union club in Wales
- Ottawa Harlequins, a rugby union club in Canada
- Oxford Harlequins RFC, a rugby union club in England
- Pembroke Dock Harlequins RFC, a rugby union club in Wales
- Pittsburgh Harlequins, a rugby union club in the United States
- Porth Harlequins RFC, a rugby union club in Wales
- Quins-Bobbies Rugby Club, formerly Pretoria Harlequins, in South Africa

=== Other sports ===
- Belfast Harlequins, a multi-sport club in Northern Ireland
- Cork Harlequins, a cricket and hockey club
- Harlequins Cricket Club, an English team

== Transportation ==
- Harlequin Air, a former Japanese airline
- Harlequin, a version of the Volkswagen Golf Mk3 car

== Other uses ==
- HMS Harlequin, the name of several ships
- USS Harlequin, a World War II United States Navy minesweeper
- Harlequin, Nottinghamshire, England
- Harlequin (color), a color between green and yellow
- Harlequin-type ichthyosis, a genetic disorder that results in thickened skin over nearly the entire body at birth
- Operation Harlequin, a World War II deception operation

== See also ==
- Arlequin (disambiguation)
- Arlecchino (disambiguation)
- Harlequin print, a repeating pattern of diamonds
- Harley Quin, an Agatha Christie character
- Harley Quinn (disambiguation)
  - Harley Quinn, a fictional villain in DC Comics
- Harlekin, a 1975 composition for clarinet by Karlheinz Stockhausen
