= Harley (surname) =

Harley is an English surname, and may refer to

- Albert Harley, English footballer
- Alex Harley (1936–1969), A Scottish professional footballer
- Bill Harley, children's entertainer
- Bob Harley (1888–1958), a former top Canadian soccer player from the 1920s
- Brilliana Harley, letter writer and a figure in the English Civil War
- Chic Harley, Ohio State football player 1916–1919
- David Harley, English security commentator, author, and musician
- Dick Harley (1872–1952), a Major League Baseball player
- Edward Harley (Parliamentarian) (1624–1700), father of the 1st Earl of Oxford
- Edward Harley (1664–1735), his second son
- Edward Harley, 2nd Earl of Oxford and Earl Mortimer, (1689–1741)
- Edward Harley, 3rd Earl of Oxford and Earl Mortimer, (1699–1755), son of Edward Harley (1664–1735)
- Edwin Harley (1849–?), minstrel show actor
- Frank Harley, a former Australian rules footballer
- George Way Harley (1894–1966), an American Methodist medical missionary to Ganta, Liberia
- Harry Harley (1926–2014), a Liberal party member of the Canadian House of Commons
- Heidi Harley, American linguist
- Henrietta Harley, Countess of Oxford and Mortimer (1694–1755), an English noblewoman
- Jade Harley, a character in the webcomic Homestuck
- Jim Harley (1917–1989), a former English footballer
- John Brian Harley (1932–1991), English geographer
- John Harley (bishop, died 1558) (died 1558), Bishop of Hereford
- John Harley (bishop, died 1788) (1728–1788), Dean of Windsor and Bishop of Hereford (second son of Edward Harley, 3rd Earl of Oxford)
- John Pritt Harley (1786–1858), an English actor
- Jon Harley, English footballer
- Joseph Auty Harley (born 1843) (1843–1906), mayor of Nelson, New Zealand, 1899–1901
- Joseph Auty Harley (born 1895) (1895–1973), mayor of Nelson, New Zealand, 1947–1956
- Joseph Emile Harley, American politician
- Les Harley (born 26 September 1946), an English former professional footballer
- Leslie Harley (October 26, 1912 – December 18, 1987), an Australian boxer
- Margaret Cavendish-Harley
- Martha Harley (later Hugill; fl. 1786–1798), author of Gothic novels
- Mike Harley Jr. (born 1997), American football player
- Robert Harley (1579–1656), English politician of the seventeenth century
- Robert Harley (c. 1706–1774), an English Member of Parliament (younger son of Edward Harley (1664–1735))
- Robert Harley, 1st Earl of Oxford and Mortimer, (1661–1724) British first minister under Queen Anne
- Robert Harley, a British comedy writer and performer
- Rufus Harley, American jazz musician
- Ryan Harley (born 22 January 1985), a professional English footballer
- Steve Harley (1951–2024), British singer-songwriter
- Thomas Harley (1730–1804), Lord Mayor of London and Member of Parliament (younger son of Edward Harley, 3rd Earl of Oxford)
- Thomas Harley (ice hockey) (born 2001), American ice hockey player
- Tom Harley, Australian rules footballer
- Trevor Harley, a psychologist and Head of the School of Psychology at the University of Dundee
- Vaughan Harley (1864–1923), British professor
- William S. Harley, co-founder and first chief engineer of the Harley-Davidson Motor Company

== See also ==
- Harley (disambiguation) (a disambiguation page)
- Harley (given name)
