= Herløv =

Name

Herløv / Herloev
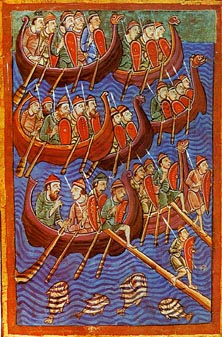
- Danish vikings invading England - 12th century
- Gender: Male ( given or middle name)

Origin
- Origin: Germanic (Old Norse & Old English)
- Meaning: I. praise gained in war II. a sign of victory, a trophy
- Region of origin: Denmark

Other names
- Related names: possibly Harlow or Herlev

Herløv, also spelled Herloev, is a name primarily used in Denmark that is applied most commonly as a middle or surname, and least commonly as a male given name. It is of Germanic origin dating back to the Viking Age. Herløv is derived from the Old Norse word "Herrlof", meaning "praise gained in war" or "a sign of victory, a trophy".

== Etymology ==
The first syllable "her", meaning army, comes from the Old Norse word for army, "herr", or its Old English equivalent, "here". Both words and their meaning exist today in Danish and Norwegian as, "hær", and in Swedish as "här"; all three languages are derived from Old Norse.

The second syllable, "løv", is derived from the word "lof", which is used in both Old Norse and Old English to mean praise or glory. The transformation of "lof" into "løv" most likely came from the Old Norse letter "F", which depending on the word, would have been pronounced either as "F" or "V". Over time, this would have led to lof being written as lov. In Swedish, the word lov still exists, unaltered in spelling or meaning.

Together, the Old Norse words herr and lof made Herrlof, alongside Herelof in Old English, both of which meant "praise gained in war" or "a sign of victory, a trophy".
