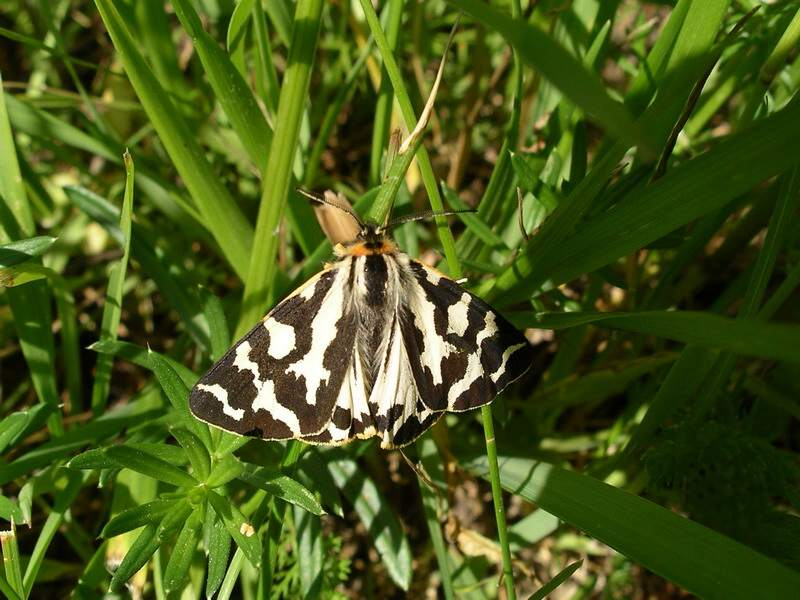
- Male
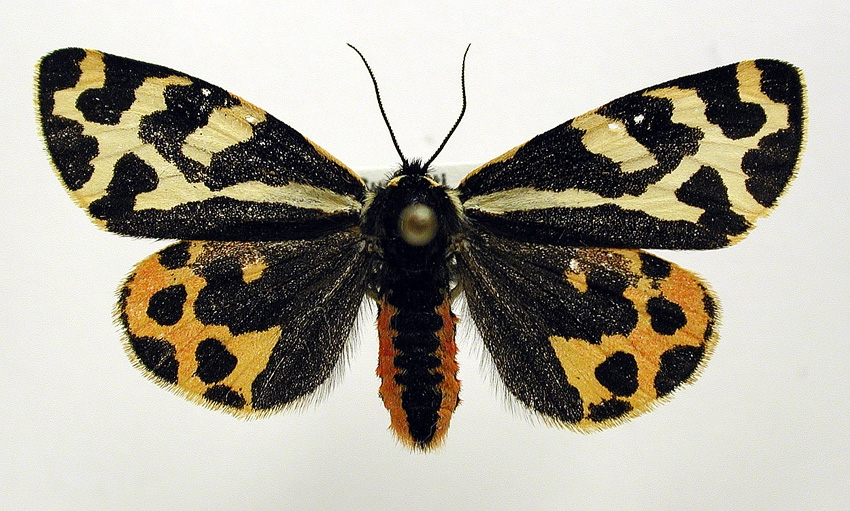
- Mounted

Scientific classification
- Kingdom: Animalia
- Phylum: Arthropoda
- Clade: Pancrustacea
- Class: Insecta
- Order: Lepidoptera
- Superfamily: Noctuoidea
- Family: Erebidae
- Subfamily: Arctiinae
- Genus: Arctia
- Species: A. plantaginis

Binomial name
- Arctia plantaginis (Linnaeus, 1758)

Synonyms
- List: Phalaena plantaginis Linnaeus, 1758; Phalaea alpicola Scopoli, 1763; Bombyx hospita [Denis & Schiffermüller, 1775]; Bombyx matronalis Freyer, 1843; Nemeophila plantaginis floccosa Graeser, 1888; Parasemia plantaginis uralensis Krulikowsky, 1904; Parasemia plantaginis insularum Seitz, 1910; Parasemia plantaginis carpathica Daniel, 1939; Chelonia plantaginis var. kamtschatica Ménétriès, 1857; Parasemia plantaginis kamtschadalus Bryk, 1942; Parasemia plantaginis paramushira Bryk, 1942; Parasemia plantaginis passanauriensis Alberti, 1973; Parasemia plantaginis hospita f. interrupta Schawerda, 1910; Parasemia plantaginis jezoensis Inoue, 1976; Nemeophila macromera var. leucomera Butler, 1881; Parasemia plantaginis japonica Inoue & Kobayashi, 1956; Nemeophila plantaginis ab. melas Christoph, 1893; Nemeophila caespitis Grote & Robinson, 1868; Nemeophila caespitis Boisduval, 1869; Nemeophila cichorii Grote & Robinson, 1868; Nemeophila cichorii Boisduval, 1869; Platarctia modesta Packard, 1864; Nemeophila alascensis Stretch, 1906; Eupsychoma geometrica Grote, 1865; Nemeophila geddesi Neumoegen, 1884; Platarctia scudderi Packard, 1864; Nemeophila selwynii H. Edwards, 1885; Parasemia plantaginis macromera ab. sachalinensis Matsumura, 1927; Parasemia plantaginis altaica Seitz, 1910; Parasemia plantaginis stoetzneri O.Bang-Haas, 1927; Parasemia plantaginis (Linnaeus, 1758)

= Arctia plantaginis =

Wood tiger

Species of moth

Arctia plantaginis, the wood tiger, is a moth of the family Erebidae. Several subspecies are found in the Holarctic ecozone south to Anatolia, Transcaucasus, northern Iran, Kazakhstan, Mongolia, China, Korea and Japan. One subspecies is endemic to North America.

This species was formerly a member of the genus Parasemia, but was moved to Arctia along with the other species of the genera Acerbia, Pararctia, Parasemia, Platarctia, and Platyprepia.

P. plantaginis males occur predominantly in two distinct color phenotypes: yellow and white. They are aposematic, meaning their colorations serve to deter predators from attacking. In populations of aposematic species, it is common to have a single coloration phenotype dominate, because predators better learn to avoid the more common phenotype and rare phenotypes suffer higher predation. Rare phenotypes are often selected against because predators are less familiar with their aposematic signal. Thus, other selective pressures exist to perpetuate weaker aposematic signals in exchange for other adaptive benefits. P. plantaginis has become a common model for studying the counteracting selective pressures of predation, mate choice, immune function, thermoregulation, and more.

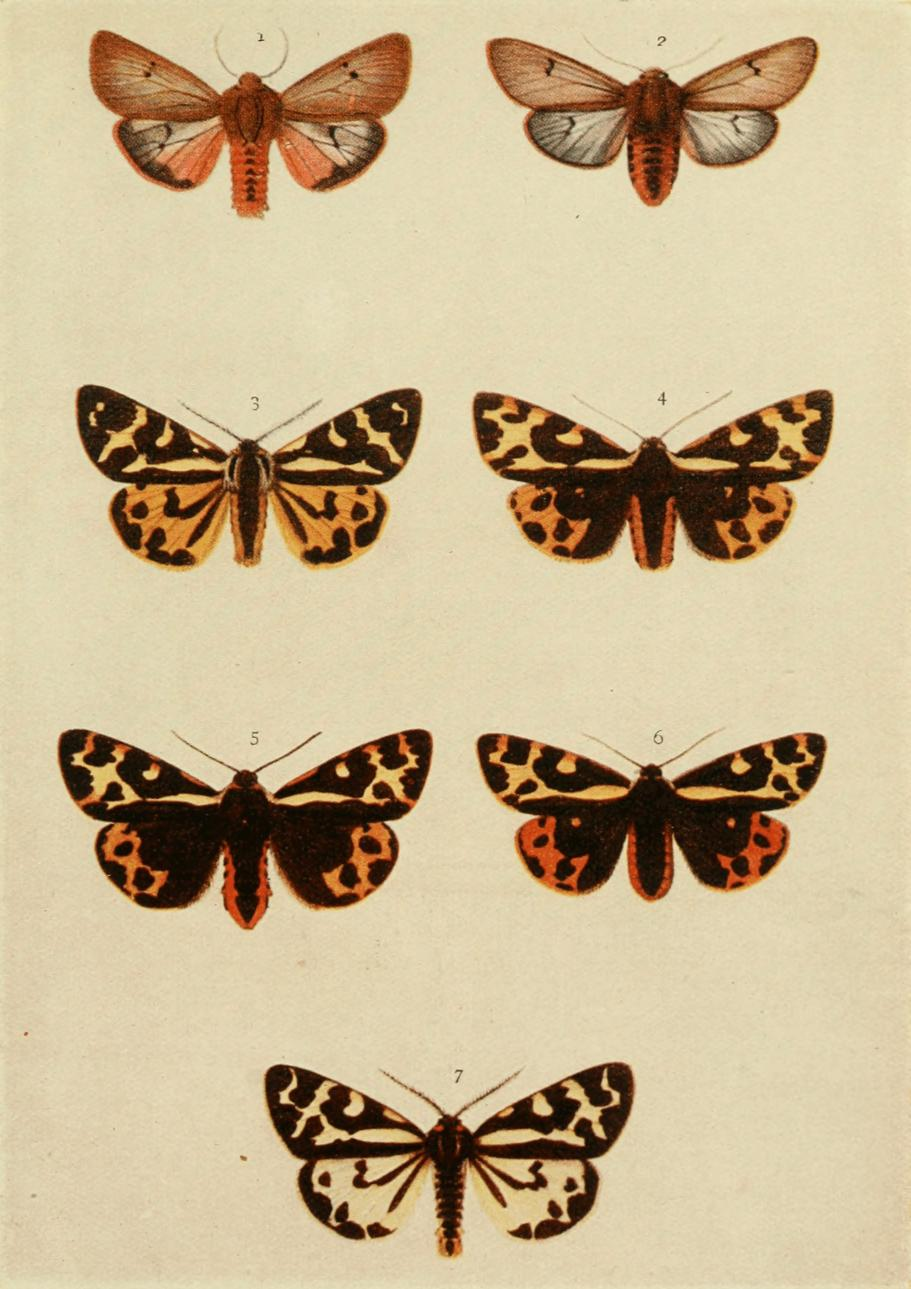
Figures 3–7, wood tiger moth forms

== Description ==
This moth is extraordinarily variable. The wingspan is 32–38 mm. Normally, it has a black forewing in both sexes, with moderately broad, ivory yellow bands. In the male, the hindwing is yellow or white with an irregular marginal band, which is often interrupted, and two or three submarginal spots. The basal portion of the hindwing bears black streaks at the margin of the cell and before the anal margin. In the female, the hindwing is red above with the base strongly black. Numerous aberrations have been found and named, which often occur predominantly, and only exceptionally among typical specimens. Major aberrations are listed by Seitz, 1913.

== Geographic range ==
There are populations throughout the globe, but most common in northern latitudes of North America and Eurasia. The North American populations range from Alaska to Manitoba, and south through the Rocky Mountain region to southern New Mexico, with isolated populations occurring in Arizona and the Sierra Nevada mountains of California and Nevada.

== Habitat ==
P. plantaginis prefer slightly moist areas, like meadows with nearby streams. Adults like to spend time close to lupine stands, which are meadows of plants from the genus Lupinus. It is estimated that over 250 annual and perennial species of this genus Lupinus are distributed throughout both montane and lowland habitats, with hugely diverse regions found in North and South America.

== Home range and territoriality ==
=== Genetic population structure ===
A two-year study of populations of P. plantaginis throughout the Alpine regions of Italy, Austria and Switzerland indicated a single whole population. Pairwise Fst values, AMOVA and COl results showed little to no differentiation between populations during the two sampling years of 2009 and 2010. This overall high genetic diversity and low differentiation between populations suggests much gene flow and high population density in P. plantaginis populations. Though this extreme gene flow would be thought to lead to fixation of a single morphological phenotype, the differential selective pressures experienced by various populations of the species likely leads to the maintenance of its widespread polymorphism.

== Food resources ==
Wood tiger moths are polyphagous, meaning their diet can vary significantly. Eating different host plants can result in different immune function and overall life history traits; one example of this is shown by wood tiger moth caterpillars that feed on ribwort plantain. These plant contain high levels of iridoid glycosides, which help caterpillars produce defensive chemicals. A 2015 study showed that the iridoid glycosides present in plantain-eating larvae is sufficient to deter both ants and parasitoids.

=== Caterpillars ===
Though it may benefit caterpillars to intake more plant compounds that can help produce defensive chemicals (depending on the plant), this process can be costly and energy intensive for caterpillars. As polyphagous larvae, this process of detoxification and toxin sequestration can be especially costly if their physiology has to support detoxification processes for different types of plants and compounds. Investing more in detoxification as larvae results in lower reproductive output as adults.

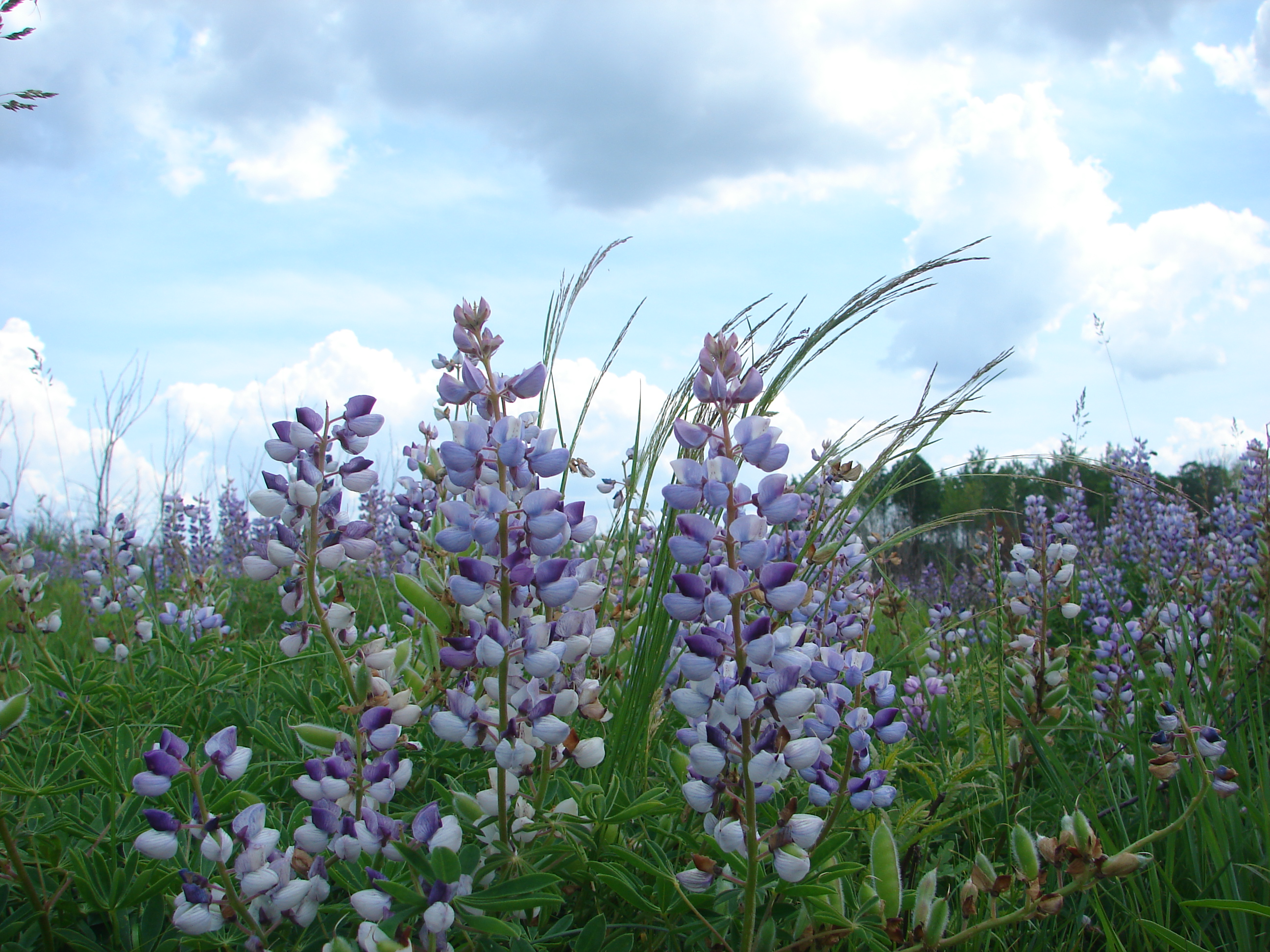
Lupine, a common host plant for Arctia plantaginis

=== Adults ===
P. plantaginis are capital breeders, which means that they do not feed as adults, and thus the larval diet is incredibly important component in adult fitness.

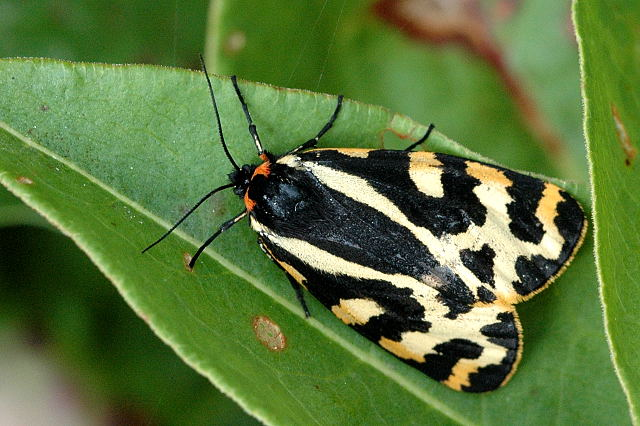
Wood tiger adult

== Life history ==
Males are, on average, smaller than females but experience a relatively similar rate of development. Generally a longer development time correlates with a larger pupal mass, and in females, pupal mass correlates with total lifetime eggs produced.

As a polyphagous species, the life history traits of P. plantaginis depend on its habitat and diet. In P. plantaginis, high anti-oxidant intake from their diet significantly increases their ability to encapsulate pathogens. Encapsulation is an important, innate immune response that occurs in invertebrates to protect against a variety of parasites and pathogens. The antioxidants serve to protect cells from damage incurred by the creation of free radicals resulting from the encapsulation reaction. In environments where the pathogen load is likely to be high, the food ingested by an individual moth is important in building its defense mechanisms.

== Enemies ==
Birds and ants are the most common predators of P. plantaginis, to which the moth has both general and specialized defense mechanisms. The blue tit (Cyanistes caeruleus) is a well known predator.

Selection by predation can impact host immune defense, as demonstrated by an experiment measuring the virulence of a pathogen Serrate marcescens in Arctia plantaginis larvae. Larvae with smaller warning signals had higher survival rates than those with larger warning signals, suggesting that developing a warning signal comes at the expense of immune function. Basically, there is a trade off between immune function and predatory defense. Thus predation is an import factor when considering the evolution of pathogen virulence and host immunity.

== Protective coloration and behavior ==
=== Aposematism ===
Aposematism is common in many Lepidoptera species; it is an adaptive mechanism in which prey produce conspicuous warning signals. In the wood tiger moth, conspicuous coloration patterns communicate a poisonous, toxic, or otherwise unpalatable or unprofitable effect to predators. Typically, aposematic species experience strong selection favoring monomorphic populations. As a specific warning signal phenotype becomes more common in an environment, more and more predators learn to avoid individuals bearing such signals. In P. plantaginis, a distinct hindwing pattern of bands and splotches of white or yellow on black warns predators of its chemical defenses. Populations of P. plantaginis, are, however, almost always polymorphic, with males exhibiting varying degrees of either yellow or white melanized banding patterns. Yellow morphs show stronger warning signals and experience lower predation rates and longer predator-hesitation. White morphs are preyed upon significantly more by birds than yellow morphs, but persist as a frequent phenotype in many populations, suggesting there are other selection pressures favoring white morphs.

A possible explanation for the persistence of white morphs despite their higher predation rates is selection heterogeneity; in other words, due to the wide geographic distribution of the wood tiger moth, different populations experience vastly different selective pressures. One consideration is immune variation. A 2013 study demonstrated that male yellow and white larvae saw different survival rates when reared in aggregations; yellow male survived to pupate better in aggregations than white males did, which may reflect different immune investments. In aggregations, white males saw better ability to encapsulate pathogens, while yellow males had higher hemolymph (equivalent to insect 'blood') lytic activity (virus attacking). Thus the two types of wood tiger moth may be maintained in populations because they have different immune investments. This is advantageous in thriving in heterogeneous environments with differential risk factors for immune challenges.

=== Feigning death ===
Though the aposematic signal of a wood tiger moth is highly conspicuous against vegetative scenery, its patterning is less easy to detect when it drops to the ground. Disruptive coloration is when a pattern creates an illusion that makes discerning the edges of an object difficult. It essentially destroys the appearance of any outline the object may have. Though the idea of disruptive coloration, which is clearly a camouflage technique, seems counterintuitive in aposematism, it has been demonstrated that the same coloration pattern on a moth can act as either a warning signal or a camouflage depending on the backdrop. Wood tiger moths exhibit a behavior where they essentially 'feign death' by dropping suddenly on to the ground in the presence of a predator and taking on a specific, rigid posture with folded legs. Once on the ground, the moths are much more difficult to detect. This suggests that the hindwing pattern of the wood tiger moth can switch instantly from conspicuous to camouflage, which has obvious adaptive advantages.

=== Target specific chemical defense mechanisms ===
A 2017 study highlighted the ability of P. plantaginis to secrete two different chemical fluids as defense mechanisms in response to two different types of predators. Along with its colorful, conspicuous hindwing color patterns, these moths secrete defense fluids from their abdomen and thoracic glands. The abdominal fluids deterred ants and not birds, while thoracic fluids deterred birds but not ants, suggesting that a single species is capable of producing target-specific chemical defense fluids in response to predation threats.

== Genetics ==
=== Subspecies ===
- Arctia plantaginis plantaginis
- Arctia plantaginis araitensis Matsumura, 1929
- Arctia plantaginis carbonelli de Freina, 1993
- Arctia plantaginis caspica Daniel, 1939
- Arctia plantaginis caucasica (Ménétriès, 1832)
- Arctia plantaginis hesselbarthi de Freina, 1981
- Arctia plantaginis interrupta Draudt, 1931
- Arctia plantaginis kunashirica Bryk, 1942
- Arctia plantaginis macromera (Butler, 1881)
- Arctia plantaginis melanissima Inoue, 1976
- Arctia plantaginis melanomera (Butler, 1881)
- Arctia plantaginis nycticans (Ménétriès, 1859)
- Arctia plantaginis petrosa (Walker, 1855)
- Arctia plantaginis sachalinensis Matsumura, 1930
- Arctia plantaginis sifanica (Grum-Grshimailo, 1891)

=== Genetics of color patterns ===
Warning signals show no phenotypic plasticity in adult wood tiger moths. The shapes and patterning of adult warning signals are entirely determined during resource allocation of the larval stage. Once an adult metamorphoses, their warning signal phenotype can no longer change.

== Mating ==
Yellow morphs are able to avoid predation more readily than white morphs; however, a laboratory study showed that yellow males had lower mating success compared to white males. This trade-off between reproductive success and predator avoidance could explain why two polymorphisms exist.

Females tend to attract males during the day, and they group together at dusk. It has been observed that once attracted to a group of females, male P. plantaginis will readily mate with females of a related species Arctica villa, most likely due to their similar sex pheromones. Similarly, female P. plantaginis are also attracted to male Artica villas.

== Physiology ==
=== Flight ===
Flight behavior in populations of P. plantaginis vary between color morphs and are under frequency dependent selection. In outdoor cage experiments of populations with various frequencies of yellow and white male morphs, researches found that white morphs were significantly more active and had longer periods of sustained activity than yellow morphs across all treatment groups. In groups with higher frequencies of yellow morphs, overall flying activity for both morphs was considerably lower. The data suggest that white male morphs invest less in producing costly warning signals and thus have more energy to invest in flight for both avoiding predation and finding mates. Yellow males, which in previous studies have been shown to be less sexually favored by females than whites, tend to be most active at peak female-calling periods.

=== Thermoregulation ===
Wood tiger moths have a limited amount of resources to allocate to different life history traits and adaptive strategies; thermoregulation is an important part of their physiology, especially in the cooler climates of North America and Eurasia. As latitude increases, populations of P. plantaginis show higher melanization (conversion of resources into melanin). This melanin confers thermoregulatory advantages by increasing a male moth's ability to absorb radiation. This increased melanization comes at a cost, however, as it is costly to produce, and thus male moths with more melanization suffer increased predation as their warning signals are weaker. Thus it is thought that due to the various climatic conditions of populations of wood tiger moth, there are different costs and benefits to produces more melanin, which serves to maintain the global diversity of warning signals that we see throughout the species. In both yellow and white male phenotypes, individuals with more melanin had a heightened ability to trap heat but an increased predation rate due to its weaker and less effective signal.

== Gallery ==
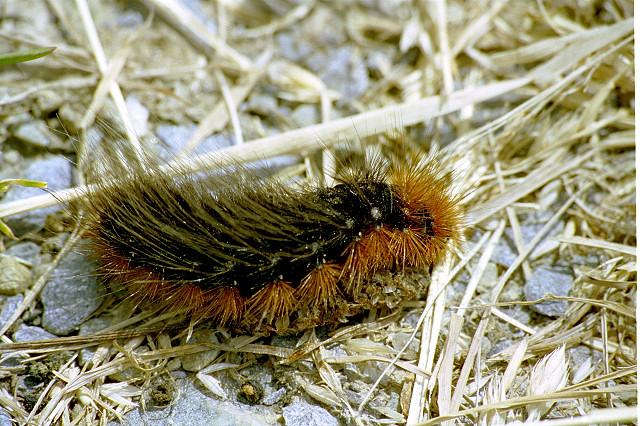
Caterpillar

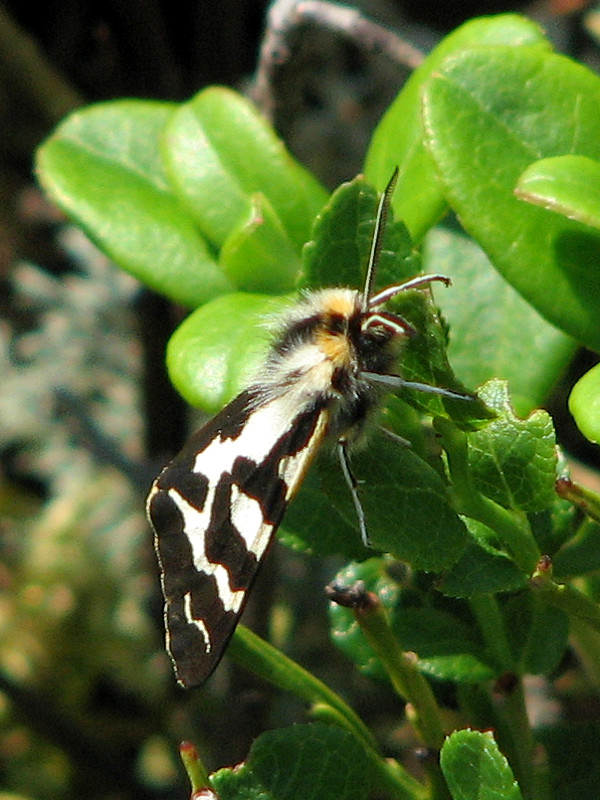
Adult

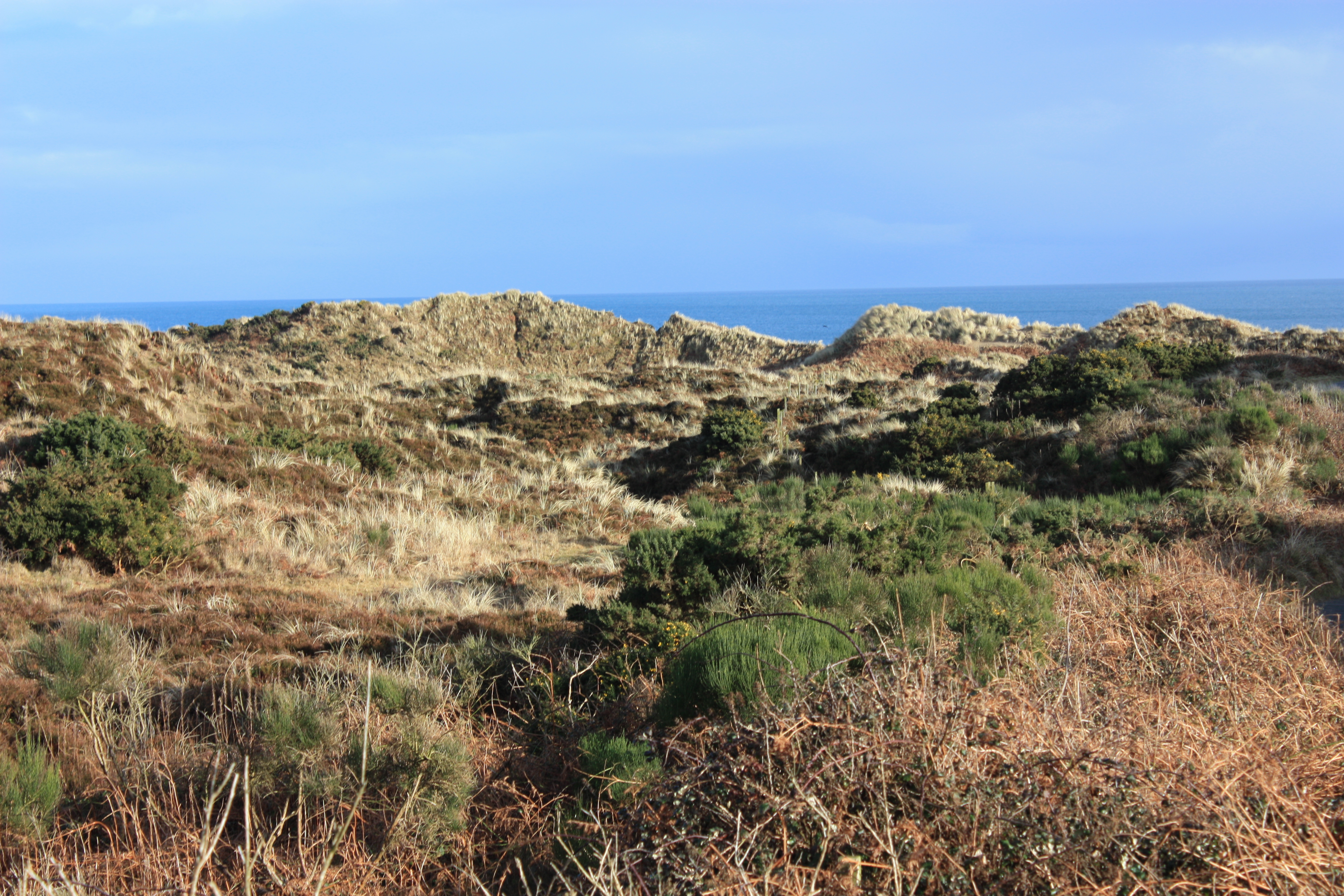
Habitat in Ireland
