= List of programs broadcast by E! (disambiguation) =

List of programs broadcast by E! is a list of programs broadcast by the U.S. channel.

List of programs broadcast by E! may also refer to:

- List of programs broadcast by E! (Canadian TV system)
- List of programs broadcast by E! (Canadian TV channel)
