= Harlee =

Harlee is a given name. Notable people with the name include:

- Harlee Dean (born 1991), English footballer
- Harlee McBride (born 1948), American actress

== See also ==
- Harleen
- Harley (given name)
