= List of programs broadcast by E! (Canadian TV system) =

This is a list of programs broadcast by CH / E!, a television system in Canada that operated from 2001 to 2009.

== Fall 2008 schedule ==
In prime time, they carried some programming purchased from the American conventional broadcast networks, but otherwise aired a program schedule that was similar to the American E! network.

	7:00 PM	7:30 PM	8:00 PM	8:30 PM	9:00 PM	9:30 PM	10:00 PM	10:30 PM
Sunday	Instant Beauty Pageant		Extreme Makeover: Home Edition		E! Special		The Real Housewives of Orange County	
Monday	The Insider	E! News	'Til Death	How I Met Your Mother	Do Not Disturb	Worst Week	Momma's Boys	
Tuesday	The Insider	E! News	The Biggest Loser				The Best Years	
Wednesday	The Insider	E! News	Knight Rider		Deal or No Deal		E! True Hollywood Story	
Thursday	The Insider	E! News	My Name Is Earl	My Name Is Earl	E! Movies We Love			
Friday	The Insider	E! News	Are You Smarter Than a 5th Grader?		Deal or No Deal		20/20	
Saturday	E! News Weekend	The Soup	Snoop Dogg's Father Hood	Kimora	Dr. 90210		Forbes Celebrity	

== The last shows broadcast by E! ==
- 20/20
- The Best Years
- Dateline NBC
- Deal or No Deal
- Diva on a Dime
- Doc
- Extreme Makeover: Home Edition
- Guiding Light
- The Harley Show
- How I Met Your Mother
- The Insider
- The Loop
- Monday Night Football (broadcast time unknown)
- My Boys
- Psych
- Running in Heels
- Stargate SG-1
- Talkshow with Spike Feresten
- WWE Friday Night SmackDown (Montreal only)

== Formerly broadcast ==
- 60 Minutes (2001–2007)
- 24
- 10 Items or Less
- Creature Comforts
- Dark Angel (2001)
- Century City (2004)
- Crossing Jordan
- Help Me Help You
- The King of Queens
- Las Vegas
- Leap of Faith (2002)
- NCIS (moved to Global)
- One Tree Hill
- K-Ville (2007)
- Raines (2007)
- Ramona
- Stacked
- Surface (2005–2006)
- Touched by an Angel
- Technical Knockout
- Two and a Half Men (2003–2007)
- Viva Laughlin – cancelled
- The Guardian

== Came into 2008-2009 season ==
- 24
- Boston Legal
- Do Not Disturb
- Knight Rider
- My Name Is Earl
- Secret Millionaire
- Worst Week

== See also ==
- Lists of Canadian television series
