= Harley Quinn (disambiguation) =

Harley Quinn is a fictional character in comic books by DC Comics.

Harley Quinn may also refer to:

== Arts and entertainment ==
- Harley Quinn (comic book), by DC Comics
- Harley Quinn (DC Extended Universe), a fictional character based on the comic book character
- Harley Quinn (TV series), based on the DC Comics character
- Birds of Prey (2020 film), or Harley Quinn: Birds of Prey
- "Harley Quinn" (song), by Fuerza Regida and Marshmello, 2023

== People ==
- Harley Quinn (pornographic actress) (Bailey Jay, fl. from 2010)
- Harley Quinn Smith (born 1999), American actress and musician

== See also ==
- Harlequin (disambiguation)
- Harley (disambiguation)
- Quinn (disambiguation)
- Harley Quin, a fictional character appearing in works by Agatha Christie
