= Arlecchino (disambiguation) =

Arlecchino is the Italian name for Harlequin, a type of comic servant character.

Arlecchino may also refer to:

== Arts and entertainment ==
- Arlecchino (opera), a one-act opera by Ferrucio Busoni composed in 1913
- Arlecchino (1949 painting), an artwork by Paolo De Poli
- Arlecchino (1979 album), an album by Mango
- "Arlecchino" (1981 song), a song by Rondo Veneziano, from the album La Serenissima
- Arlecchino, a character in 2020 video game Genshin Impact

== Vehicles ==
- Aviamilano CPV1 Arlecchino, a sailplane
- ETR 250 Arlecchino, a passenger train type, see FS Class ETR 300

== See also ==
- Harlequin (disambiguation)
