= Harleen =

Harleen is a given name. Notable people with the name include:

- Harleen Deol (born 1998), Indian cricketer

Fictional characters

- Dr. Harleen Frances Quinzel or Harley Quinn, a fictional character in DC Comics

== See also ==
- Harley (disambiguation)
