= Hamilton Harlequins =

New Zealand rugby team

(New Zealand) Hamilton Harlequins
- Full name: New Zealand Harlequin Rugby Club
- Union: New Zealand Rugby Football Union
- Nickname: Quins
- Founded: 1938
- Location: Hamilton, Waikato, New Zealand
- Region: Waikato
- President: Graham Jefferis
- Captain: Lance Fletcher
Team kit

Official website
- www.nzharlequinsrugbyclub.co.nz

The Hamilton Harlequins are a New Zealand rugby union team. Membership of the club is restricted to ek-Waikato (County) representatives, All Blacks or members of the New Zealand Services team, and certain invited players. The club is an invitation XV more akin to the famous Barbarian FC than to a normal rugby club with weekly fixtures in a competitive league structure; the aims of the club are:

- To renew and maintain old friendships of playing days,
- To engage in football free from competition, for the joy of it,
- To invite promising juniors to play for the club and teach such youngsters the spirit of the game,
- To play friendly games with similar clubs when such can be conveniently arranged.

== History ==
Following visits to England by the All Blacks, some players decided to form a club based on similar lines to famous clubs in England. As a result, the New Zealand Barbarians was formed in Auckland and the Hamilton Harlequins in Waikato.

It was decided to ask the London Harlequins for approval for the club to be called the Harlequin FC and to use the same colours. This permission was granted and the club played its first match in Tauranga in 1939, but before the club could establish itself the Second World War intervened. The club was revived after the war in 1946.

Many All Blacks have played in the New Zealand Harlequin's jersey over the years and, since the inclusion of the under 17 development programme in 1992, the club has given a clear development pathway for young up and coming Waikato rugby players. Annual matches with NZ Area Schools and the NZ Vikings Club from Northland have become regular features. A NZ Harlequin camp, backed by the NZ Rugby Foundation and supported by the Waikato Rugby Union for approx 40-45 players, is staged at St Paul's Collegiate School annually.
