= Harley Frank =

Harley Frank is a member of the Kainai Nation in southern Alberta, Canada. Frank has held a number of notable positions within the Kainai Nation's administration, including being elected chief, in 1992.

== Frank v. Bottle ==
Frank was elected Chief of the Kainai Nation in 1992. Although he was elected other members of the band council worked to get him removed from office. The legal battle was heard in Canada's federal court, in Frank v. Bottle. The court ruled in Frank's favor. But he decided to step aside.

The publication Wind Speaker noted:

While other laws, regulations and the government policy of respecting the inherent right of First Nations to govern themselves have made it more difficult for grassroots members to demand and receive access to council information and enforce accountability, the judge's decision in Frank v. Bottle states without question that band councils are federal boards that are subject to Canadian law. That allows recourse to grassroots members to appeal council decisions that are seen as arbitrary or unfair.

== September 15, 1999 conviction ==
On September 26, 1996, Frank shipped half a truckload of barley, that had been grown on his reserve, in a native owned truck, to a buyer in the nearby Blackfoot Reservation in Montana. Frank was charged with exporting grain without a valid export license. Frank was convicted, and received an absolute discharge, on September 15, 1999. Garry Brietkreuz, a Canadian Member of Parliament, contrasting Frank's discharge with the sentences other farmers received, noted:

However, Frank was given an absolute discharge because Justice Stevens-Guille didn’t think he was selling the grain to make a profit, but was doing it to challenge the current law.

== Frank's 2005 run for chief ==
Frank ran for chief again, in 2005. Frank was not elected chief, but as one of the runners-up with the most votes, he won a seat on the Band Council.

Frank appeared before the Standing Senate Committee on Aboriginal Peoples on October 27, 2005.

== Founding member of the Blood Band chapter of the Council of Canadians ==
In 2015 Frank joined with other band members in calling for band councilors to be more transparent about their expenses.
