= Analysis of molecular variance =

Analysis of molecular variance (AMOVA), is a statistical model for the molecular algorithm in a single species, typically biological. The name and model are inspired by ANOVA. The method was developed by Laurent Excoffier, Peter Smouse and Joseph Quattro at Rutgers University in 1992.

Since developing AMOVA, Excoffier has written a program for running such analyses. This program, which runs on Windows, is called Arlequin and is freely available on Excoffier's website. There are also implementations in R language in the ade4 and the pegas packages, both available on CRAN (Comprehensive R Archive Network). Another implementation is in Info-Gen, which also runs on Windows. The student version is free and fully functional. Native language of the application is Spanish but an English version is also available.

An additional free statistical package, GenAlEx, is geared toward teaching as well as research and allows for complex genetic analyses to be employed and compared within the commonly used Microsoft Excel interface. This software allows for calculation of analyses such as AMOVA, as well as comparisons with other types of closely related statistics including F-statistics and Shannon's index, and more.
