= Harlow (given name) =

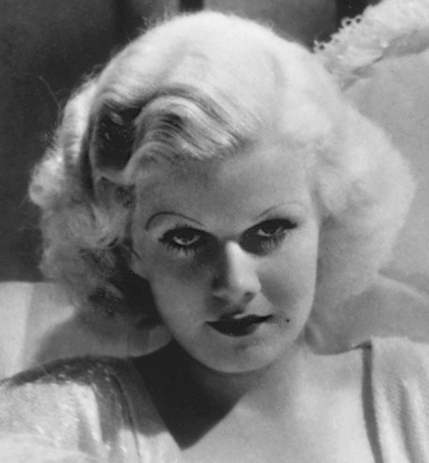
- Actress Jean Harlow.
- Gender: Unisex

Origin
- Origin: English
- Meaning: "Rock hill" or "army hill."
- Region of origin: England

Harlow is a given name of English origin, a transferred use of a surname and place name meaning "rock hill" or "army hill." Spelling variants Harlo and Harlowe are also in use.

The name is associated with the actress Jean Harlow. It has also been used recently for their children by celebrities, which has increased awareness of the name.

== Popularity ==
The name was among the top one thousand names for boys in the United States between 1882 and 1900, and again in 1906, 1916, and 1936. It is still used for boys but is no longer among the most used names for boys.

The name has recently increased in usage for girls in English-speaking countries. In the United States, it has been among the one thousand most popular names for newborn American girls since 2009 and has ranked among the top three hundred and fifty names for girls since 2019. It has ranked among the top one hundred names for girls in Australia since 2017, among the top one hundred names for girls in New Zealand since 2019, and among the top one hundred names for girls in Scotland since 2021. It has been among the top five hundred names for girls in England and Wales since 2014 and among the top two hundred names for girls since 2020.

== Men ==
- Harlow Akers (1898–1945), American politician
- H. Keith H. Brodie (1939–2016), American psychiatrist, educator, president of Duke University
- Harlow Bundy (1856–1916), American businessman
- Harlow Cuadra, American actor, producer, and criminal
- Harlow Curtice (1893–1962), American automotive industry executive
- Harlow C. Curtiss, American attorney and investor
- Harlow S. Orton (1817–1895), American lawyer and judge
- Harlow S. Person (1875–1955), American economist
- Harlow Robinson (born 1950), American historian
- Harlow Rothert (1908–1997), American athlete
- Harlow Shapley (1885–1972), American astronomer
- Harlow Giles Unger (1931–2025), American author and historian
- Harlow Wilcox (disambiguation)

== Women ==
- Harlow Madden (born 2008), American musician
