= USS Harlequin =

Minesweeper of the United States Navy

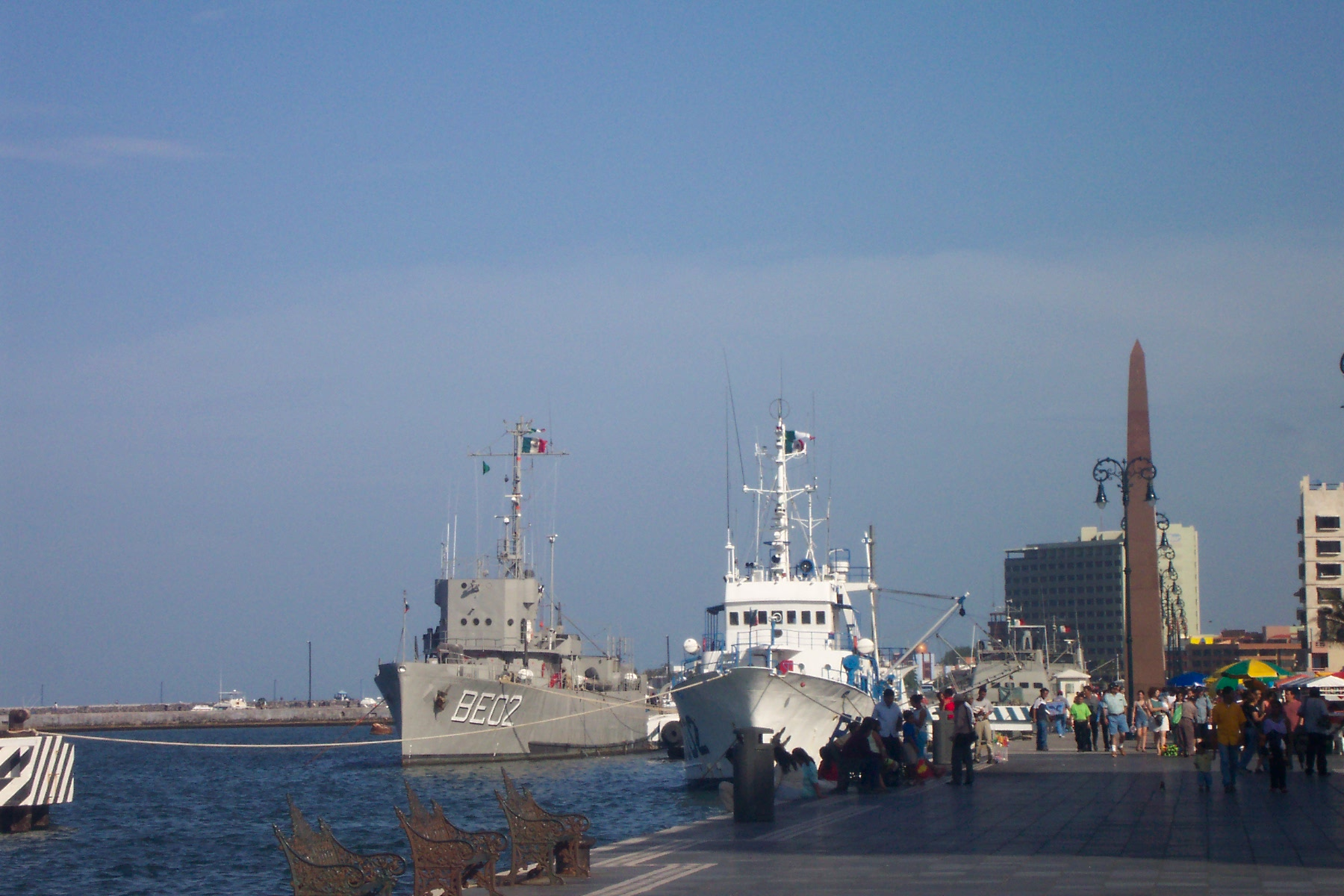
- ARM Aldabaran (BE02) seen in 2006.

History

United States
- Name: USS Harlequin (AM-365)
- Builder: Willamette Iron and Steel Works, Portland, Oregon
- Laid down: 3 August 1943
- Launched: 3 June 1944
- Commissioned: 31 August 1945
- Decommissioned: 27 May 1946
- Reclassified: MSF-365, 7 February 1955
- Stricken: 1 May 1962
- Fate: Transferred to Mexican Navy, 2 October 1962

History

Mexico
- Name: ARM DM-20
- Acquired: 2 October 1962
- Renamed: ARM Oceanográfico (H02), c. 1978; ARM General Pedro María Anaya (A08), 1993; ARM Aldabaran (BE02), after April 1999
- Refit: converted to oceanographic research vessel, 1976–1978
- Status: in active service, as of 2007

General characteristics
- Class & type: Admirable-class minesweeper
- Displacement: 650 long tons (660 t)
- Length: 184 ft 6 in (56.24 m)
- Beam: 33 ft (10 m)
- Draft: 9 ft 9 in (2.97 m)
- Propulsion: 2 × ALCO 539 diesel engines, 1,710 shp (1,280 kW); Farrel-Birmingham single reduction gear; 2 shafts
- Speed: 15 knots (28 km/h)
- Complement: 104
- Armament: 1 × 3"/50 caliber (76 mm) DP gun; 2 × twin Bofors 40 mm guns; 1 × Hedgehog anti-submarine mortar; 2 × Depth charge tracks

USS Harlequin (AM-365) was an Admirable-class minesweeper built for the United States Navy during World War II. She served in the Atlantic during World War II. She was decommissioned in May 1946 and placed in reserve. While she remained in reserve, Harlequin was reclassified as MSF-365 in February 1955 but never reactivated. In October 1962, she was sold to the Mexican Navy and renamed ARM DM-20. From 1976–1978 she was converted to an oceanographic research vessel and renamed ARM Oceanográfico (H02) around the same time. In 1993 she was renamed ARM General Pedro María Anaya (A08). In the late 1990s, she was again renamed, this time to ARM Aldabaran (BE02), as a school ship. As of 2007, Aldebaran remained in active service with the Mexican Navy.

== U.S. Navy career ==
Harlequin was launched 3 June 1944 by Willamette Iron and Steel Works, Portland, Oregon; sponsored by Mrs. Mary M. Doig, whose husband and son were reported missing in action and who also had another son, a brother, and nine nephews in the Navy. She commissioned 28 September 1945. Reporting to San Pedro, California, for shakedown 19 October, Harlequin remained there until 29 November, when she sailed south, reaching New Orleans, Louisiana, 15 December. Harlequin sailed to Orange, Texas, 2 April 1946 and decommissioned there 27 May. While she remained in reserve, Harlequin was reclassified MSF-365 on 7 February 1955. Harlequin was struck from the Navy List on 1 May 1962, and later, on 2 October 1962, sold to Mexico.

== Mexican Navy career ==
The former Harlequin was acquired by the Mexican Navy in October 1962 and renamed ARM DM-20. From 1976–1978 she was disarmed and converted to an oceanographic research vessel; she was renamed ARM Oceanográfico (H02) around this same time. In 1993, she was renamed ARM General Pedro María Anaya (A08). Some time after April 1999, she was rearmed and converted to a school ship (Spanish: barco escuela) and renamed ARM Aldabaran (BE02).

As of 2007, Aldebaran remained in active service with the Mexican Navy. The vessel was later sunk to create an artificial reef. This reef is a popular dive spot for tourists.
