= Trevor Harley =

British academic (born 1958)

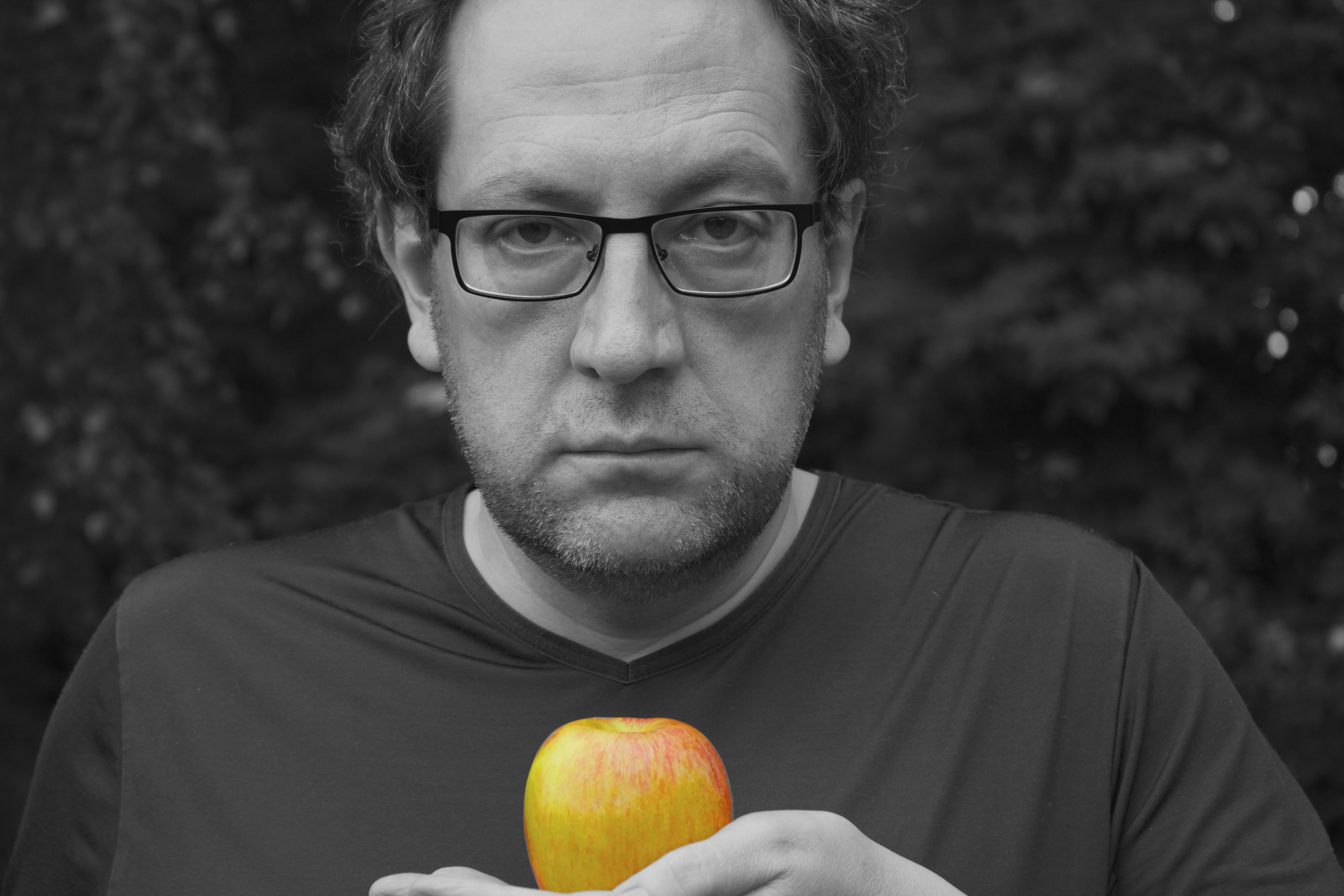
- Born: Trevor Harley; 1958 (age 67–68); London, United Kingdom
- Occupations: Emeritus Professor of Psychology at University of Dundee, Scotland; writer
- Known for: Psychology of Language, Consciousness, and the Weather

Trevor Harley is emeritus chair of Cognitive Psychology. His research is in the psychology of language and consciousness and the effect of the weather on human behaviour. From 2003 until 2016 he was Head and Dean of the School of Psychology at the University of Dundee, Scotland, United Kingdom. He is author of several books, including "The Psychology of Language", currently in its fourth edition, published by Psychology Press, "Talking the talk", a book about the psychology of language (psycholinguistics) aimed at a more general audience, "The Science of Consciousness", a general text on consciousness, and "Head in the Clouds - How the weather affects our minds and mental health" a book of popular science. He is a Fellow of the British Psychological Society.

== Early life and education ==
Trevor Harley was born in 1958 in London and grew up near Southampton. He was educated at Price's Grammar School, Fareham. His undergraduate degree was in Natural Sciences at St John's College in the University of Cambridge. He stayed at Cambridge to study for his PhD under the supervision of Brian Butterworth. His PhD was on "Slips of the tongue and what they tell us about speech production".

For his PhD and later research he collected a corpus of several thousand naturally occurring speech errors, and focused on one word substitutes for another (e.g. saying "pass the pepper" instead of "pass the salt"). He concluded that speech production is an interactive, parallel process, leading him to an interest in connectionist modelling Connectionism, and research on computational modelling, ageing, and metacognitive processes.

== Academic career ==
Following his doctoral studies, Harley began his teaching career at the University of Warwick before moving to the University of Dundee as a Senior Lecturer in 1996.

In 2003, he was appointed to a personal chair in Cognitive Psychology and took over as the Head of the Department of Psychology. He served as both Head and Dean of the School of Psychology from 2003 until 2016. Harley currently holds the title of Emeritus Professor of Cognitive Psychology at the University of Dundee, maintaining an ongoing academic association with the institution while focusing on popular science writing and public speaking.

In addition to his teaching and research he has contributed to the assessment of research quality as a senior editor of academic journals, an output assessor for the Research Excellence Framework and a contributor to numerous national and international research funding evaluations.

He has appeared regularly on television, radio and social media talking about his work on psychology and the weather. He has also performed as a stand-up comic at the Edinburgh Festival Fringe.

=== Research Interests ===
Harley is known for his work on speech production and in particular how we represent meaning, and how language is affected by brain damage, and by normal and pathological ageing (e.g. Alzheimer's and Parkinson's diseases). He also works on how we control our own cognition, and how this metacognitive ability changes with age. Underlying all his research is a belief that the mind is a parallel, interactive computer, best studied by experimentation and computational modelling. He is committed to accessibility of scientific knowledge for all and has published books intended for a general audience as well as academic texts.

His focal interest in meteorology is severe weather events in Britain and the British weather in general and he maintains a site covering these, available from trevorharley.com, calling this role as a "psychometeorologist". He maintains a weather station at Newtyle near Dundee. His book "The Psychology of Weather" is published in the Routledge "Psychology of Everything" series. In "Head in the Clouds - how the weather affects our minds and mental health" (2026) he explores the effects of the weather on human behaviour and mental health.

He relaxes by playing chess in competitions and is a dedicated photographer. His photography includes astronomy, where his shots appear in encyclopaedias and the weather where his pictures feature in BBC weather broadcasts under the name 'Perdix'. When not writing he delights in the countryside around his home which he shares with his miniature poodle Beau.

== Selected publications ==
=== Books ===
- Harley, Trevor A. (2014). The Psychology of Language: From Data to Theory (4th ed.). Psychology Press. ISBN 978-1848720893.
- Harley, Trevor A. (2018). Talking the Talk: Language, Psychology and Science (2nd ed.). Psychology Press. ISBN 978-1138800458.
- Harley, Trevor A. (2019). The Psychology of Weather. Routledge. ISBN 978-1138545595.
- Harley, Trevor A. (2021). The Science of Consciousness: Waking, Sleeping and Dreaming. Cambridge University Press. ISBN 978-1108493130.
- Harley, Trevor A. (2026). Head in the Clouds: How the Weather Affects Our Minds and Mental Health. Dorling Kindersley. ISBN 978-0241684740.

=== Highly cited academic papers ===
- Harley, Trevor A. (1984). "A critique of top-down independent levels models of speech production: Evidence from non-planned speech errors". Cognitive Science 8 (3): 191–219.
- Harley, Trevor A.; MacAndrew, Siobhan B. G. (2001). "Is constraints-based parsing wrong? Commentary on Pickering, Traxler, and Crocker (2000)". Journal of Psycholinguistic Research 30 (3): 275–285.
- Harley, Trevor A.; Jessiman, Lesley J.; MacAndrew, Siobhan B. G.; Astell, Arlene J. (2008). "I don't know what I know: Evidence of preserved semantic knowledge but impaired metalinguistic knowledge in adults with probable Alzheimer's disease". Aphasiology 22 (3): 321–335.

For an exhaustive record of Professor Harley's historical academic publications and peer-reviewed articles, see his curated curriculum vitae database on the Trevor Harley Official Website.
