= Harleigh =

Harleigh may refer to:

- Harleigh, Pennsylvania, U.S.
- Harleigh Cemetery, Camden, New Jersey, U.S.
- Harleigh Hanrahan (fl. 1920s/1930s), Australian rugby league footballer
- Harleigh Trecker (1911–1986), American social work academic and administrator

== See also ==
- Harley (disambiguation)
