= Harlow Wilcox =

Harlow Wilcox may refer to:

- Harlow Wilcox (musician) (1943–2002), American musician
- Harlow Wilcox (announcer) (1900–1960), American radio announcer
