= Harley =

Harley may refer to:

== People ==
- Harley (given name)
- Harley (surname)

== Places ==
- Harley, Ontario, a township in Canada
- Harley, Brant County, Ontario, Canada
- Harley, Shropshire, England
- Harley, South Yorkshire, England
- Harley Street, in London, England

== Other ==
- Harley-Davidson, an American motorcycle manufacturer
  - Harley Owners Group (H.O.G.), a club for Harley-Davidson motorcycle owners
- Harley Benton Guitars, a brand name created by German music instrument retailer Thomann
- Harley Lyrics, a 14th-century collection of poems
- Harley Street (TV series), a British television medical drama
- Harley Collection, a collection of manuscripts in the British Library
- The Harley School, a school in Rochester, New York
- Harley Psalter, an 11th-century illustrated manuscript

== See also ==
- Harley Quinn (disambiguation)
- Harleigh (disambiguation)
- Harly, a commune in France
- Harly Forest, a hill range in Germany
