= L'Arlequin =

Coordinates: 48°51′4.01″N 2°19′49.76″E

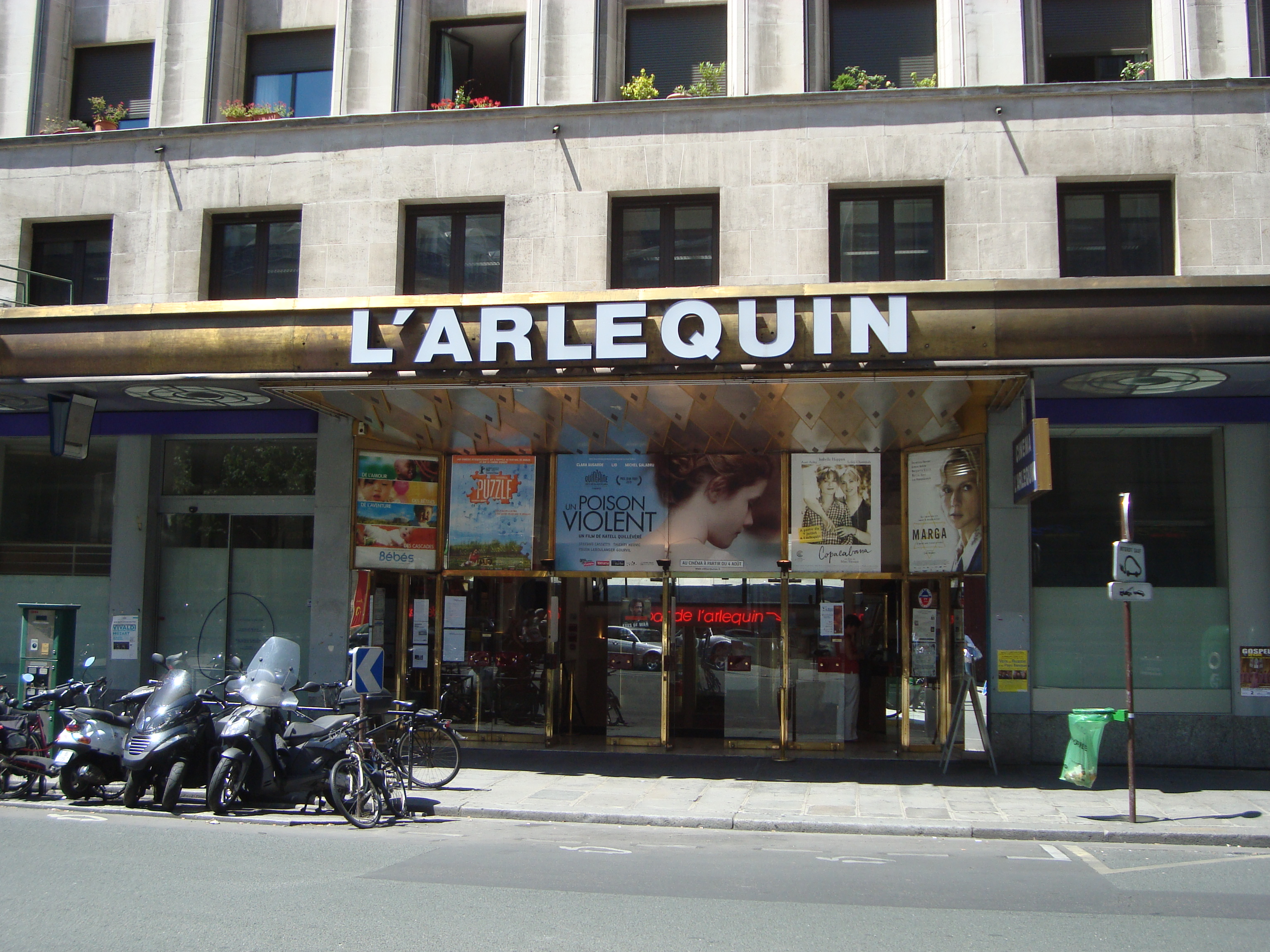
L'Arlequin

The Arlequin is a cinema in Paris, noted for its spacious modernist main theatre and its former role as a showcase of Soviet film.

== History ==
Opened in 1934 as the Lux Rennes, the cinema was situated in the building of its patron, the Compagnie parisienne d'électricité. The art-deco, air-conditioned 500-seat theatre, with 12-metre screen and adjacent bar, was somewhat luxurious for the period.

In 1962 Jacques Tati acquired the cinema and renamed it L'Arlequin. In 1978 it was bought by a company specialised in import-export with the USSR, which changed its name to Le Cosmos and focused its programming on Soviet films. L'Arlequin regained its current name in 1992.

Two screens were added in 1998 with the incorporation of part of an adjacent cabaret theatre.

== Programming ==
L'Arlequin is known for its specialisation in German and Russian films.
