= Harley Brinsfield =

American radio DJ and restaurateur (1909–1990)

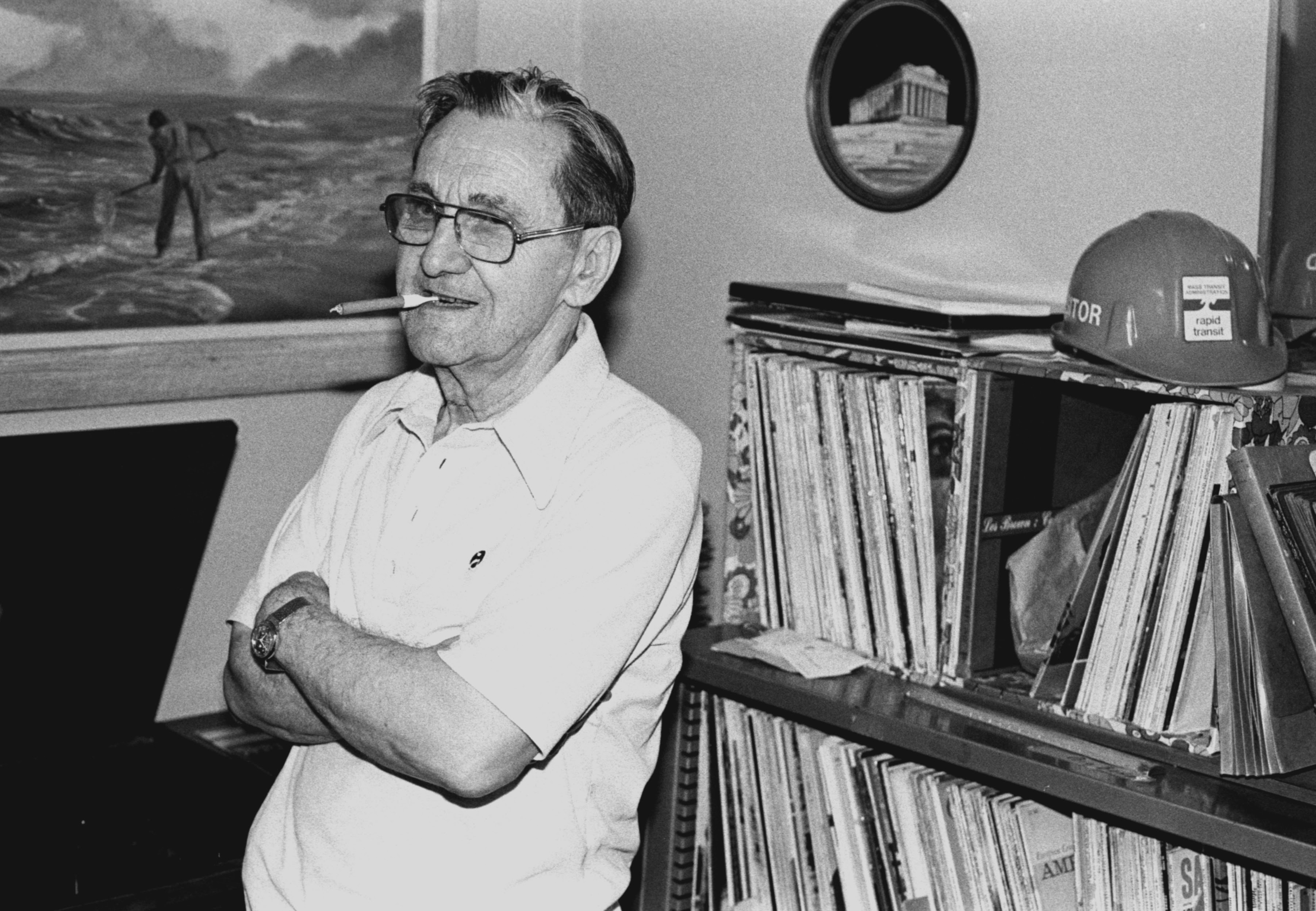
- Brinsfield circa 1980
- Born: 1909 near Eldorado, Maryland, U.S.
- Died: 1990 (age 81); Towson, Maryland, U.S.
- Resting place: Gardens of Faith, Baltimore
- Known for: Jazz radio DJ, restaurateur
- Spouse(s): Anna E. Hunt (1930s–1940s); Arline Levy (d. 1978)
- Children: 2

Harley Payne Brinsfield Sr. (1909–1990) was an American radio program host and owner of a sandwich restaurant chain. He was also a commissioner representing Baltimore for the State Roads Commission, predecessor to the Maryland State Highway Administration.

Brinsfield hosted The Harley Show, Music out of Baltimore on WBAL and later on WFBR from about 1952 to sometime in the 1970s. With his second wife, Arline Levy Brinsfield, he opened Harley Submarine Sandwich Shops, which, largely due to the publicity generated by his show, became one of the first and largest local fast food franchises pre-dating both McDonald's and Subway by many years.

== Early life ==
Brinsfield was born in 1909 to Eva Payne, a former schoolteacher, and Harley Philip Brinsfield, a waterman, in Dorchester County, Maryland, near Eldorado. His father died in 1917. Brinsfield completed eight years of school and began sailing the Atlantic Ocean as an early teenager. Settling in Baltimore, he married Anna Ethel Hunt in the 1930s, with whom he had two sons, before the couple divorced in the 1940s. (Note: Anna had a daughter with her second husband in 1947.) Brinsfield later married Arline Levy.

== Restaurant chain ==
Brinsfield sold his first sandwich at a stand he operated at Lexington Market in the 1940s. His first Harley's sandwich shop was at McMechen Street and Linden Avenue. More shops came later, including at 5041 Reisterstown Road, 2235 Edmondson Avenue, 1001 East 25th Street, 6416 Holabird Avenue, 2047 East Monument Street, and 3203 Greenmount Avenue. The chain was open all night.

Brinsfield said his sandwich recipes were perfected over the nine years that he served in the Merchant Marine. The New Orleans po' boy sandwich may have inspired his submarine.

In the late 1970s, Brinsfield sold his sandwich business to Shane's, a new franchise that wanted to take over his locations. A Harley's in Laurel had opened in 1966 and when Shane's began operation in 1979, it advertised that "nothing's changed but the name", and identified three other Shane's locations. (Note: Other Shane's locations in 1979 were in Catonsville, downtown Baltimore, and northern Baltimore.) A new owner leased the Shane's in Laurel in 1985 and operation stayed in that family until it was forced to close in January 2020 due to the property being sold. The shop was within the parking lot of a bowling alley that had closed five months before.

Harley's burgers and hot sauce are no longer sold, though imitation recipes have been published. In 2018, a radio station source described the content of his original sub sandwich.

== Radio program ==
Brinsfield bought night broadcasting time on a succession of local radio stations (first in 1948 on WITH, then WSID, WCBM, WBAL from 1958 to 1974, and back to WITH in 1974). He used his gravelly voice and fun personality to present classic jazz and related popular music, including from his own large collection of records. Jacques Kelly of The Baltimore Sun described Brinsfield's "Harley Show" as "(unconsciously) some of the greatest local radio in Baltimore".

He purchased two hours in a block and had complete charge of the show. The show lead in with the theme "Things Ain't What They Used To Be" (played by a Duke Ellington small band with Johnny Hodges on the tenor sax) and closed with "Sailing Down the Chesapeake Bay" (played by Bob Scobey's Frisco Band). Brinsfield would showcase a particular performer and trace that performer's development throughout his show. At various times, he used "Tishomingo Blues" going to commercials or breaks.

Top jazz musicians, when they performed around Washington D.C. or Baltimore, would join his show and reminisce with Brinsfield about old times.

== Personal life ==
Brinsfield was an old friend of Millard Tawes, governor of Maryland from 1959 to 1967, who named him as a commissioner of the Maryland State Roads Commission in the 1960s. Ironically, Brinsfield never drove a car, often walking along St. Paul Street from his home in the Marylander Apartments while carrying thousands of dollars in his baggy pockets. He loved to talk.

Through his radio program, Brinsfield became friends with jazz singer Billie Holiday, and when she visited Baltimore, she stayed at an apartment he had built upstairs at his McMechen Street sandwich shop.

Brinsfield was USN Retired when he met and married Arline Levy of San Francisco, California. A family story is that she hocked her engagement and wedding rings for sufficient cash to open the first Harley's. She became the bookkeeper for the chain, which eventually peaked at 15–20 restaurants throughout Maryland.

== Death and legacy ==
Brinsfield died on May 6, 1990, at Greater Baltimore Medical Center in Towson after a long illness. He was survived by three siblings, his two sons, and five grandchildren. He has the strange legacy of being perhaps the most obscure person in the history of jazz, while at the same time remembered and missed by more people than any other.

== Sources ==
- Olesker, Michael (1995). Michael Olesker's Baltimore. The Johns Hopkins University Press. ISBN 978-0-8018-5203-9.
- D. A. Levy, Researcher, Director of The Maritime Heritage Project (www.maritimeheritage.org), and niece of Arline Levy Brinsfield.
