= Blaine Township, Nebraska =

Blaine Township, Nebraska may refer to the following places in Nebraska:

- Blaine Township, Adams County, Nebraska
- Blaine Township, Antelope County, Nebraska
- Blaine Township, Cuming County, Nebraska
- Blaine Township, Kearney County, Nebraska

== See also ==
- Blaine Township
