= Blaine =

Blaine may refer to:

== People ==
- Blaine (given name)
- Blaine (surname)
- Blaine (cartoonist), Canadian political cartoonist

== Places in the United States ==
- Blaine, Georgia, an unincorporated community
- Blaine, Idaho, an unincorporated community
- Blaine, Illinois, an unincorporated community
- Blaine, Indiana, an unincorporated community
- Blaine, Kansas, an unincorporated community
- Blaine, Kentucky, a city
- Blaine, Maine, a town
  - Blaine (CDP), Maine, a census-designated place within the town
- Blaine, an unincorporated community in Grant Township, St. Clair County, Michigan
- Blaine, Minnesota, a city
- Blaine, Mississippi, an unincorporated community
- Blaine, Missouri, an unincorporated community
- Menoken, North Dakota, a census-designated place originally named Blaine
- Blaine, Ohio, an unincorporated community
- Blaine, Tennessee, a city
- Blaine, Washington, a city
  - Blaine Air Force Station, a now closed radar station
- Blaine, West Virginia, an unincorporated community
- Blaine, Wisconsin, a town
- Blaine, Portage County, Wisconsin, an unincorporated community
- Blaine County (disambiguation)
- Blaine Township (disambiguation)
- Blaine Island, South Charleston, West Virginia

== Schools ==
- Blaine High School (Minnesota), Blaine, Minnesota
- Blaine High School (Washington), Blaine, Washington

== See also ==
- Blaine method, a method of measuring the fineness of a powder material
- Blain (disambiguation)
- Blane (disambiguation)
