= Blane =

Blane may refer to:

== Mountains in Canada ==
- Mount Blane (Alberta)
- Mount Blane (British Columbia)

== Names ==
- Blane (given name)
- Blane (surname)

== See also ==
- Blaine (disambiguation)
- Blain (disambiguation)
