= Blain (surname) =

Blain is a surname. Notable people with the surname include:

- Adair Blain (1894–1983), Austrian Parliament member
- Amanda Blain, Canadian Internet personality
- Brian Blain (1936–1994), Australian actor
- Georgia Blain (1964–2016), Australian journalist
- Gérard Blain (1930–2000), French actor
- James Blain, Canadian Boy Scout
- John Blain (disambiguation), multiple people
- John Blain (Canadian football) (born 1955), Canadian football player
- Philippe Blain (born 1960), French volleyball player and coach
- Tony Blain (born 1962), New Zealand cricketer
- Sandra Blain (born 1941) American ceramicist
- Ser'Darius Blain (born 1987), American actor
- Virginia Blain, Australian literary scholar
- Willy Blain (born 1978), French boxer

== See also ==
- Blaine (surname)
- Blanes (surname)
- Blane, a surname
- Blain, fictional character in the 1987 film Predator
