= Blaine (given name) =

- Pronunciation: /ˈbleɪn/
- Gender: Unisex
- Language: English

Origin
- Language: English
- Origin: Blaine (surname)
- Region of origin: England

Other names
- Variant forms: Blayne; Blane; Blain
- See also: Blaine (surname)

Blaine or Blayne is a unisex given name.

Notable people with the name include:

== Male ==
- Blayne Barber (born 1989), American professional golfer
- Blaine B. Taylor (1946–2021) American author, journalist, political aide, and Vietnam War veteran
- Blaine Bennett (born c. 1964), American college football coach
- Blaine Bishop (born 1970), American former National Football League safety
- Blaine Boyer (born 1981), American Major League Baseball pitcher
- Blaine Calkins (born 1968), Canadian politician
- Blaine Crim (born 1997), American baseball player
- Blaine Denning (1930–2016), American basketball player
- Blaine Earon (1929–2019), American National Football League lineman
- Blayne Enlow (born 1999), American professional baseball pitcher
- Blaine Gabbert (born 1989), American National Football League quarterback
- L. Blaine Hammond (born 1952), American test pilot and retired astronaut and US Air Force colonel
- Blaine Hardy (born 1987), American baseball player
- Blaine Harrison (born 1985), English indie/rock musician
- Blayne Heckel (born 1953), American experimental physicist
- Blaine Higgs (born 1954), Canadian politician
- Blaine Johnson (1962–1996), American drag racer
- Blaine Kruger (born 1985), Canadian Football League wide receiver
- Blaine Lacher (born 1970), Canadian retired National Hockey League goalie
- Blaine Larsen (born 1986), American country music singer and songwriter
- H. Blaine Lawson (born 1942), American mathematician
- Blaine Lindgren (1939–2019), American track and field hurdler
- Blaine Luetkemeyer (born 1952), U.S. Representative from Missouri
- Blaine (cartoonist) (1937–2012), Canadian editorial cartoonist Blaine MacDonald
- Blaine McCallister (born 1958), American golfer with five PGA Tour wins
- Blaine McElmurry (born 1973), American National Football League safety
- Blaine Milam (1989–2025), American executed murderer
- Blaine Mueller, American basketball coach
- Blaine Nye (born 1946), American retired National Football League lineman and businessman
- Blayne Osborn, American politician
- Blaine Pedersen, Canadian politician
- M. Blaine Peterson (1906–1985), U.S. Representative from Utah
- Blaine Saipaia (born 1978), American National Football League player
- Blaine Schmidt (born 1963), Canadian Football League player
- Blaine Scully (born 1988), American rugby union player
- Blaine Stoughton (born 1953), Canadian National Hockey League player
- Blaine Taylor (born 1958), American college basketball player and coach
- Blaine Thacker (1941–2020), Canadian politician
- Blaine Thurier (born 1967), Canadian musician and film producer
- Blaine Watkins, American politician
- Blayne Weaver (born 1976), American actor and filmmaker
- Blayne Wikner (born 1972), South African cyclist
- Blaine Willenborg (born 1960), American former tennis player
- Blaine Wilson (born 1974), American retired gymnast
- Blayne Wilson (born 1992), Australian rules footballer

== Female ==
- Blayne Alexander (journalist), American television journalist
- Blayne Arthur, American rancher and politician
- Blaine Morris, American actress, producer, and writer in the Dark Obsession (2023 film)
- Blaine Ridge-Davis (born 1999), British track cyclist and BMX cyclist
- Blaine Saunders (born 1993), American actress
- Blaine Trump (born 1948), American socialite

== Fictional characters ==
- Blaine (Pokémon) (Katsura in the original Japanese version), the name of a gym leader in the Pokémon universe
- Blaine Anderson, in the TV series Glee
- Blaine the Mono, a psychotic artificial intelligence-controlled monorail locomotive in Stephen King's novels The Wastelands and Wizard and Glass
- Blaine Edwards, a character portrayed by Damon Wayans in the In Living Color sketch Men on Film

== See also ==
- Blaine (surname)
- Blane (given name)
