= Blaine Township =

Blaine Township may refer to:

- Blaine Township, Ida County, Iowa
- Blaine Township, Wright County, Iowa
- Blaine Township, Clay County, Kansas
- Blaine Township, Marion County, Kansas
- Blaine Township, Ottawa County, Kansas, in Ottawa County, Kansas
- Blaine Township, Smith County, Kansas, in Smith County, Kansas
- Blaine Township, Michigan
- Blaine Township, Adams County, Nebraska
- Blaine Township, Antelope County, Nebraska
- Blaine Township, Cuming County, Nebraska
- Blaine Township, Kearney County, Nebraska
- Blaine Township, Bottineau County, North Dakota
- Blaine Township, Pennsylvania
- Blaine Township, Clark County, South Dakota, in Clark County, South Dakota
- Blaine Township, Jerauld County, South Dakota, in Jerauld County, South Dakota
