= Blane (surname) =

Blane is a surname. Notable people with the name include:

== People ==
- Archibald Blane (c. 1787–1852), British businessman
- Alexander Blane (c. 1850–1917), Irish politician
- Frances Aviva Blane, English painter
- G. R. Blane (1791–1821), employee of the East India Company in British India
- Gilbert Blane (1749–1834), Scottish physician who pioneered the use of limejuice in the Royal Navy as a preventative for scurvy
- Helen Blane (1913–2000), British alpine skier.
- John Blane (1929–2012), American diplomat
- Marcie Blane (born 1944), American pop singer
- Mark Blane (born 1988), American actor, writer, and director
- Nicholas Blane, English actor
- Ralph Blane (1914–1995), American composer, lyricist, and performer
- Sally Blane (1910–1997), American actress
- Steven Blane, American rabbi
- Sue Blane (born 1949), English costume designer
- Thomas Blane, (fl. 1918–1922), English politician
- William Blane (1750–1835), British landowner and F.R.S.

== Fictional characters ==
- Jonas Blane, character in American TV show The Unit
- Torchy Blane, female reporter in Warner Bros. films

== See also ==
- Blane (given name)
- Blain (surname)
- Blaine (surname)
- Blanes (surname)
