= Feminism in culture =

Influence of feminism on culture

Feminism has affected culture in many ways, and has famously been theorized in relation to culture by Angela McRobbie, Laura Mulvey and others. Timothy Laurie and Jessica Kean have argued that "one of [feminism's] most important innovations has been to seriously examine the ways women receive popular culture, given that so much pop culture is made by and for men." This is reflected in a variety of forms, including literature, music, film and other screen cultures.

== Women's writing ==
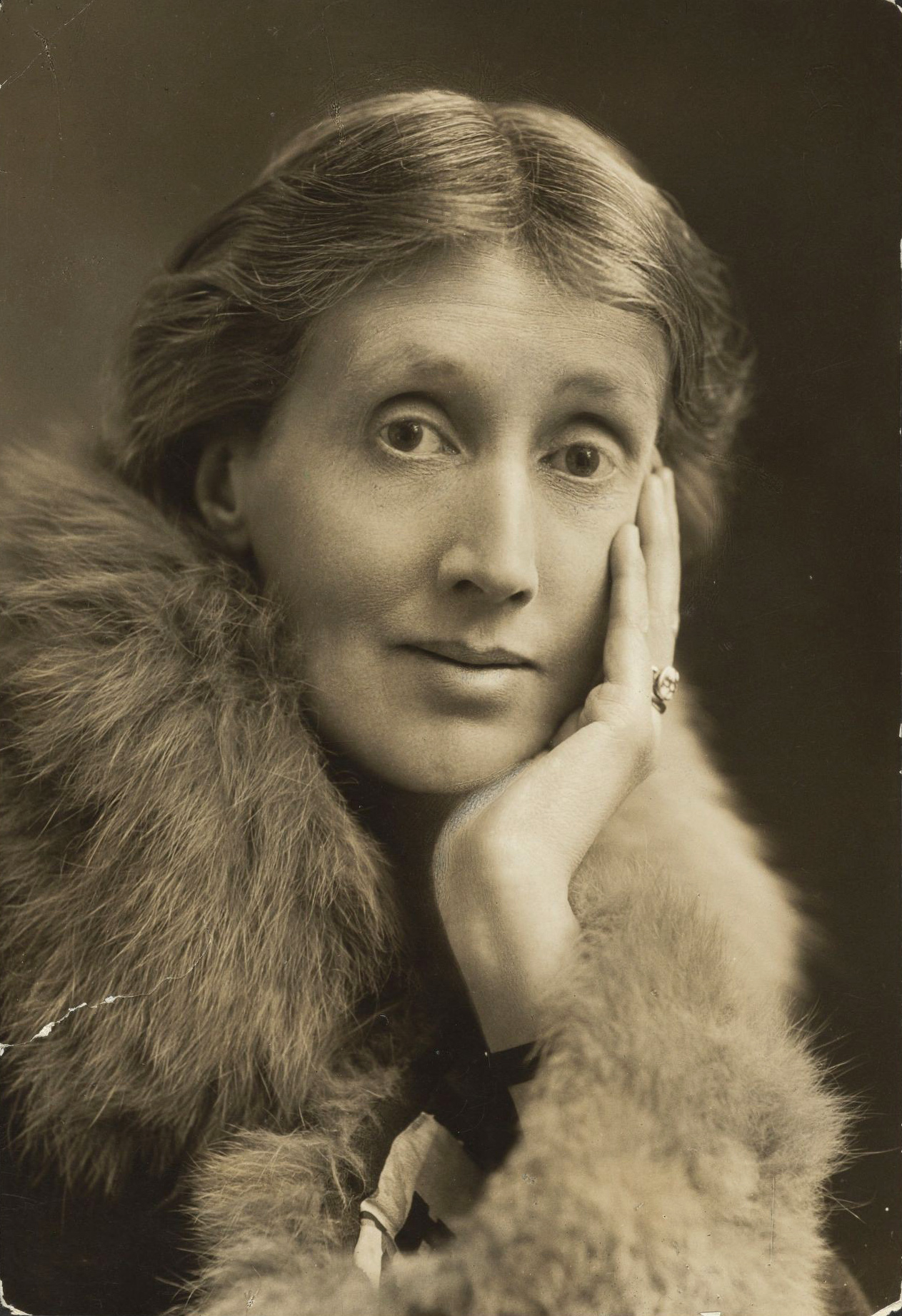
Virginia Woolf

Women's writing came to exist as a separate category of scholarly interest relatively recently. In the West, second-wave feminism prompted a general reevaluation of women's historical contributions, and various academic sub-disciplines, such as Women's history (or herstory) and women's writing (including in English) (a list is available), developed in response to the belief that women's lives and contributions have been underrepresented as areas of scholarly interest. Virginia Blain et al. characterize the growth in interest since 1970 in women's writing as "powerful". Much of this early period of feminist literary scholarship was given over to the rediscovery and reclamation of texts written by women. Studies such as Dale Spender's Mothers of the Novel (1986) and Jane Spencer's The Rise of the Woman Novelist (1986) were ground-breaking in their insistence that women have always been writing. Commensurate with this growth in scholarly interest, various presses began the task of reissuing long-out-of-print texts. Virago Press began to publish its large list of nineteenth- and early-twentieth-century novels in 1975 and became one of the first commercial presses to join in the project of reclamation. In the 1980s, Pandora Press, responsible for publishing Spender's study, issued a companion line of eighteenth-century novels written by women. More recently, Broadview Press has begun to issue eighteenth- and nineteenth-century works, many hitherto out of print, and the University of Kentucky has a series of republications of early women's novels. There has been commensurate growth in the area of biographical dictionaries of women writers due to a perception, according to one editor, that "most of our women are not represented in the 'standard' reference books in the field".

=== Science fiction ===
In the 1960s, the genre of science fiction combined its sensationalism with political and technological critiques of society to produce feminist science fiction. With the advent of feminism, questioning women's roles became fair game to this "subversive, mind expanding genre". Two early texts are Ursula K. Le Guin's The Left Hand of Darkness (1969) and Joanna Russ' The Female Man (1970). They serve to highlight the socially constructed nature of gender roles by creating utopias that do away with gender. Both authors were also pioneers in feminist criticism of science fiction in the 1960s and '70s, in essays collected in The Language of the Night (Le Guin, 1979) and How To Suppress Women's Writing (Russ, 1983). Another major work of feminist science fiction has been Kindred by Octavia Butler.

== Women's films ==
The term "women's cinema" usually refers to the work of women film directors. It can also designate the work of other women behind the camera such as cinematographers and screenwriters. Although the participation of women film editors, costume designers, and production designers is usually not considered to be decisive enough to justify the term "women's cinema", it does have a large influence on the visual impression of any movie.

In a film from popular culture although not in women's film, an early reference to the "feminist movement" is heard from Katharine Hepburn in the 1942 movie Woman of the Year.

Another film, She Is Beautiful When She's Angry, released in 2014, details the women's liberation movement in the United States with real accounts from women involved.

== Women's music ==
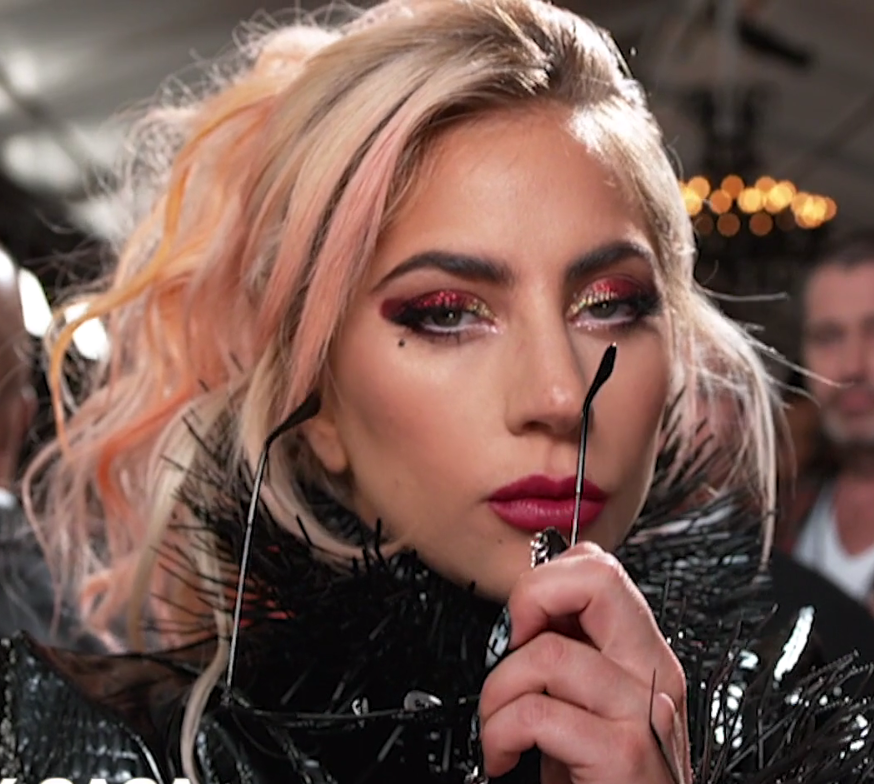
Lady Gaga is an example of recent female feminist musicians.

Women's music (or womyn's music or wimmin's music) is the music by women, for women, and about women. The genre emerged as a musical expression of the second-wave feminist movement as well as the labor, civil rights, and peace movements. The movement was started by lesbians such as Cris Williamson, Meg Christian, and Margie Adam, African-American women activists such as Bernice Johnson Reagon and her group Sweet Honey in the Rock, and peace activist Holly Near. Other women such as Madonna, Cyndi Lauper and Lady Gaga have also revolutionized feminist music today by breaking barriers and allowing artists from all walks of life to have their time in the spotlight. Women's music also refers to the wider industry of women's music that goes beyond the performing artists to include studio musicians, producers, sound engineers, technicians, cover artists, distributors, promoters, and festival organizers who are also women.

== Riot grrrl movement ==
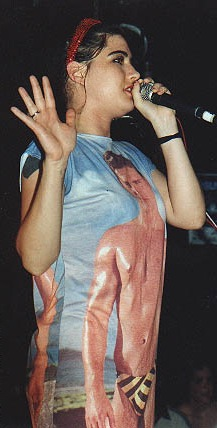
Kathleen Hanna was the lead singer of Bikini Kill, a riot grrrl music band formed in 1990.

Riot grrrl (or riot grrl) is an underground feminist punk movement that started in the 1990s and is often associated with third-wave feminism (it is sometimes seen as its starting point). It was grounded in the DIY philosophy of punk values. Riot grrrls took an anti-corporate stance of self-sufficiency and self-reliance. Riot grrrls' emphasis on universal female identity and separatism often appears more closely allied with second-wave feminism than with the third wave. Riot grrrl bands often address issues such as rape, domestic abuse, sexuality, and female empowerment. Some bands associated with the movement are Bikini Kill, Bratmobile, Excuse 17, Free Kitten, Heavens to Betsy, Huggy Bear, L7, and Team Dresch. In addition to a music scene, riot grrrl is also a subculture; zines, the DIY ethic, art, political action, and activism are part of the movement. Riot grrrls hold meetings, start chapters, and support and organize women in music.

The riot grrrl movement sprang out of Olympia, Washington, and Washington, D.C., in the early 1990s. It sought to give women the power to control their voices and artistic expressions. Riot grrrls took a growling double or triple r, placing it in the word girl as a way to take back the derogatory use of the term.

The riot grrrls' links to social and political issues are where the beginnings of third-wave feminism can be seen. The music and zine writings are strong examples of "cultural politics in action, with strong women giving voice to important social issues though an empowered, a female oriented community, many people link the emergence of the third-wave feminism to this time". The movement encouraged and made "adolescent girls' standpoints central", allowing them to express themselves fully.

== Pornography ==
The feminist sex wars is a term for the acrimonious debates within the feminist movement in the late 1970s through the 1980s around the issues of feminism, sexuality, sexual representation, pornography, sadomasochism, the role of trans women in the lesbian community, and other sexual issues. The feminist debate on porn pitted anti-pornography feminism against sex-positive feminism, and parts of the feminist movement were deeply divided by these debates.

=== Anti-pornography movement ===
Anti-pornography feminists, such as Catharine MacKinnon, Andrea Dworkin, Robin Morgan, and Dorchen Leidholdt, put pornography at the center of a feminist explanation of women's oppression.

Some feminists, such as Diana Russell, Andrea Dworkin, Catharine MacKinnon, Susan Brownmiller, Dorchen Leidholdt, Ariel Levy, Robin Morgan, and Page Mellish, argue that pornography is degrading of women and complicit in violence against women both in its production (whereby, they charge, abuse and exploitation of women performing in pornography is rampant) and in its consumption (whereby, they charge, pornography eroticizes the domination, humiliation, and coercion of women and reinforces sexual and cultural attitudes that are complicit in rape and sexual harassment).

Beginning in the late 1970s, anti-pornography radical feminists formed organizations such as Women Against Pornography and Feminists Fighting Pornography that provided educational events, including slide-shows, speeches, and guided tours of the sex industry in Times Square, New York City, in order to raise awareness of the content of pornography and the sexual subculture in pornography shops and live sex shows. Andrea Dworkin and Robin Morgan began articulating a vehemently anti-porn stance based in radical feminism beginning in 1974 and anti-porn feminist groups, such as Women Against Violence in Pornography and Media in San Francisco, became highly active in various U.S. cities during the late 1970s.

=== Sex-positive movement ===
Sex-positive feminism is a movement that was formed in order to address issues of women's sexual pleasure, freedom of expression, sex work, and inclusive gender identities. Ellen Willis' 1981 essay, "Lust Horizons: Is the Women's Movement Pro-Sex?" is the origin of the term, "pro-sex feminism"; the more commonly used variant, "sex positive feminism" arose soon after.

Although some sex-positive feminists, such as Betty Dodson, were active in the early 1970s, much of sex-positive feminism largely began in the late 1970s and 1980s as a response to the increasing emphasis in radical feminism on anti-pornography activism.

Sex-positive feminists are also strongly opposed to radical feminist calls for legislation against pornography, a strategy they decried as censorship, and something that could, they argued, be used by social conservatives to censor the sexual expression of women, gay people, and other sexual minorities. The initial period of intense debate and acrimony between sex-positive and anti-pornography feminists during the early 1980s is often referred to as the feminist sex wars. Other sex-positive feminists became involved not in opposition to other feminists but in direct response to what they saw as patriarchal control of sexuality.

== Sex work and sex industry ==
Feminist views on sex work and prostitution vary. Feminist supporters of sex worker rights and decriminalization argue that women's right to control their own bodies and sexuality includes the right to engage in consensual sexual commerce. They also argue that criminalization and social stigmatization of sex work and sex workers only worsens the existing marginalization and victimization that sex workers are often subjected to. On the other hand, feminist opponents of prostitution argue that prostitution is so tangled with forced prostitution, human trafficking, exploitation, and violence as to be inseparable from these ills in practice. They also argue that prostitution and other forms of sex work are inherently a product of patriarchy and sexism, and that the presence even of consensual sex work is harmful to society and women in particular. While feminists across all positions generally agree that direct criminalization of women in prostitution should be ended, there is little or no consensus on much else on the topics of legal approaches to the sex trade, the status of sex workers, or the nature of sex work itself.

== See also ==
- Feminist art
