= Blaney (surname) =

Blaney is a surname. Notable people with the surname include:

- Alan Blayney (born 1981), football goalkeeper from Northern Ireland
- Benjamin Blayney (1728–1801), English divine and Hebraist
- Dave Blaney (born 1962), American stock car racing driver
- David Blaney (born 1979), English footballer
- Diana Blaney, American planetary scientist
- Dorothy B. Blaney (1921–1998), American stamp collector
- Frederick Blaney (1918–1988), Irish cricketer
- George Blaney (born 1939), American former basketball player and coach
- Greg Blaney, Irish Gaelic footballer and hurler
- Harry Blaney (1928–2013), Irish politician
- Ian Blayney (born 1962), Australian politician
- Isabella W. Blaney (1854–?), American suffragette
- James Blaney (born 1974), Irish former rugby union player and current coach
- James G. Blaney, major general in the US National Guard
- John Blayney (1925–2018), Irish rugby player, barrister, and Supreme Court judge
- John W. Blaney (born 1948), American diplomat
- Leah Blayney (born 1986), Australian soccer coach and former player
- Margaret-Ann Blaney (fl. 1999–2012), Canadian journalist and politician
- Mark Blaney, film producer (Africa United, Escape from Pretoria)
- Max Blaney (1910–1940), Second World War British Army bomb defuser
- Neil Blaney (1922–1995), Irish politician
- Reece Blayney (born 1985), Australian rugby league footballer
- Ryan Blaney (born 1993), American stock car racing driver
- Steven Blaney (born 1965), Canadian businessman and politician
- Steven Blaney (footballer) (born 1977), Welsh footballer
- Tim Blaney (born 1959), American puppeteer and voice actor
- Vaughn Blaney, Canadian educator and political figure

== See also ==
- Baron Blayney, an extinct title in the Peerage of Ireland, including a list of titleholders with the name
- Blayney (disambiguation)
- William Banks-Blaney (born 1973)
