= Blanes (surname) =

Blanes is a surname. Notable people with the surname include:

- Andreu Blanes (born 1981), Spanish orienteering competitor and long-distance runner
- Camilo Blanes Cortés (1946–2019), Spanish singer
- Johanna Blanes (1995–2019), French murder victim
- Jonathan Blanes (born 1987), Uruguayan footballer
- Juan Manuel Blanes (1830–1901), Uruguayan painter

== See also ==
- Blake (surname)
- Barnes (surname)
- Blane (surname)
- Blane (given name)
- Blaine (surname)
- Blaney (surname)
