= Blayney =

Blayney could refer to:

== Places ==
- Blayney, New South Wales, Australia, a small town
- Blayney Shire, New South Wales
- Blayney, Ontario, Canada, a farming hamlet
- Castleblayney, Ireland, often shortened to Blayney by locals

== People ==
- Blaney (surname), includes Blayney
- Blayney Townley (Dunleer MP), MP (1692–1715) for Dunleer (Parliament of Ireland constituency)
- Blayney Townley-Balfour (Carlingford MP) (1705–1788)

== Other uses ==
- Baron Blayney, an extinct title in the Peerage of Ireland
