= Foliejon Park =

Manorial country house in Berkshire, England

Coordinates: 51.462°N 0.705°W

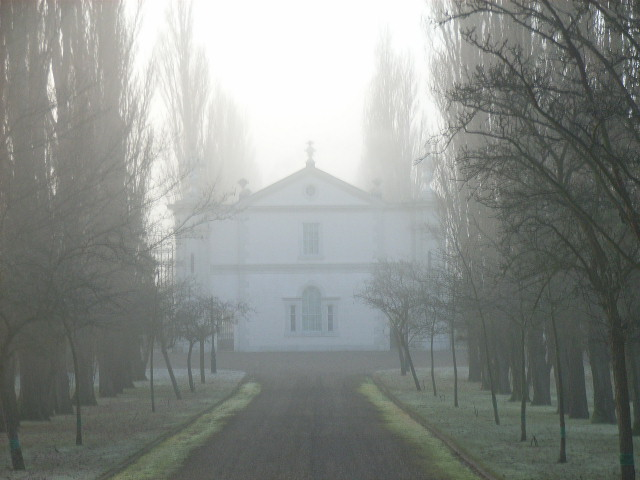
Main Entrance Foliejon Park

Foliejon Park is a manorial country house in the civil parish of Winkfield in the English county of Berkshire. The building has been listed as Grade II since 7 December 1966 and was the temporary residence of King Haakon VII during the Nazi occupation of Norway.

== History ==
Foliejon was initially known as Belestre, a hunting lodge granted by King Edward I to John Drokensford, Bishop of Bath and Wells, later co-regent for his son, Edward II. He changed the name of his Berkshire residence to 'Folies Johan', which in Anglo-Saxon means 'owned by John'. It is mentioned in the 'Rotulorum Originalium Abbreviatio' that "the palaces of Hyremere and Belestre, commonly called folye Johan were taken by the King in 1313 as payment for debts of the bishop and assigned in 1317 to Oliver de Bordeaux for the rent of a red rose with license to surround the estate of Foly Johan and make it a park". Olivier de Bordeaux's stepson William Trussell inherited the property. However, Edward III, wanting to unify Foliejon with Windsor Great Park, forcibly exchanged it for the manor of Eaton Hastings in the Vale of White Horse in 1359.

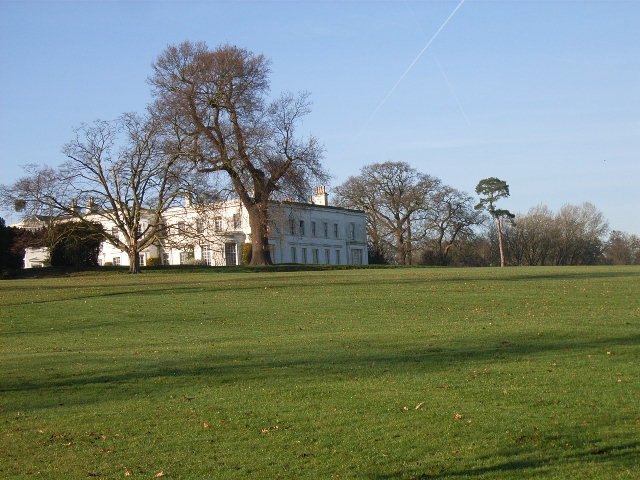
Side view

Foliejon continued as a royal estate for three centuries until it was sold to Serjeant Henne in 1630, who was invested with a baronetcy in 1642. The property was inherited by his son, Henry, in 1667, grandson, Henry, in 1675, great-grandson, Richard, in 1705, and the co-heiresses, Penelope and Alice, in 1710. In 1735, Penelope sold her share to a "Mr. Bennett". Lord Henry Beauclerk bought out Bennet in 1744 and Alice in 1748. In 1771, Foliejon was sold to George Phillips Towry, who sold it to Thomas Bingley in 1800, who, in turn, sold it to William Blane in 1802. William left his estates to Thomas Law Blane, who, in turn, left them to his nephew, Captain Gordon Gilbert Blane, in 1885.

During the German occupation of Norway in World War II, the King, Haakon VII, and his son Olav, resided at Foliejon Park from March 1942 to June 1945. During this period, the property was also the seat of the Norwegian government in exile.

In 1957, the property was bought by Gerald T. Hodge as a conference centre for the company Mining and Chemical Products Ltd. The avenue of poplars in front of the residence was planted at this time, with seeds brought from Hodge's travels. Several other rare trees were planted in the gardens. Hodge and his family lived on the property until he died in a plane crash in 1966.
