= John Blaine =

John Blaine may refer to:

- John J. Blaine (1875–1934), American lawyer and politician
- John Blaine, pseudonym for authors Harold L. Goodwin (all titles) and Peter J. Harkins

== See also ==
- John Blain (disambiguation)
