= John Blain =

John Blain may refer to:

- John Blain (cricketer) (born 1979), Scottish cricketer
- John Blain (Canadian football) (born 1955), football player

== See also ==
- John Blaine (disambiguation)
