= Blayne Alexander (journalist) =

American television journalist

- Born: Oklahoma City, Oklahoma
- Education: Duke University (BA)
- Years active: 2009–present
- Employer: NBC News
- Spouse: James Bailey
- Children: 2
- Awards: 4x Emmy Award Nominee, Rising Star Award

Blayne Alexander is an American television journalist. She is a correspondent for NBC's newsmagazine Dateline NBC and was previously an Atlanta-based correspondent for NBC News.

== Early life and education ==
Born and raised in Oklahoma City, Alexander graduated from Duke University, and was a member of the Delta Sigma Theta sorority.

== Career ==
From 2011 to 2017 Alexander worked at WXIA in Atlanta, Georgia, where she covered the 2016 Summer Olympics in Rio De Janeiro, Brazil.

In 2019 she worked at NBC as the network's Atlanta-based correspondent, where she covered the COVID-19 pandemic, the United States racial unrest protests, the 2020 United States presidential election in Georgia and 2022 Georgia state elections, and the Georgia election racketeering prosecution indictment of former President Trump in Georgia.

In 2024, Alexander was named a Dateline NBC correspondent, following time off for maternity leave.

She is a member of the National Association of Black Journalists.

== Awards and recognition ==
Alexander has been honored by the Atlanta Press Club and the Gracie Awards.

== Personal life ==
Alexander is married to James Bailey, and they have two daughters together.
