= Archibald Blane =

Archibald William Blane (c. 1787 – 6 November 1852) was a British businessman who emigrated to Australia and became the director and deputy governor of the Australian Agricultural Company (AAC).

Blane was instrumental in the opening up and agricultural exploitation of New South Wales. He discovered the wealth of the Peel River district. Blane died in Booral, New South Wales, Australia, in 1852 aged 65, but is buried in Kensal Green Cemetery in London. A memorial tablet to Blane exists in Stroud Church, Stroud, one of the "company towns" of the AAC.
