= Blain =

Blain may refer to:

== People ==
- Blain Morin (born 1960), Canadian politician
- Blain (surname)

== Places ==
- Blain, Pennsylvania, U.S.
- Blaine Township, Washington County, Pennsylvania, U.S.
- Electoral division of Blain, Northern Territory, Australia
- Blain, Loire-Atlantique, France

== Other ==
- Blain (animal disease), an eighteenth-century term for an animal disease involving a swelling on the root of the tongue
- Bláin, another name for the Norse giant Ymir
- Chilblains, a medical condition similar to frostbite

== See also ==
- Blaine (disambiguation)
