= James G. Blaney =

United States Army general (1938–2020)

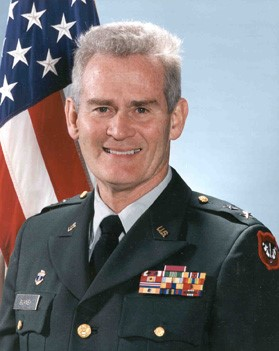
Maj. Gen. James G. Blaney

James Gary Blaney (October 17, 1938 – October 18, 2020) was a retired major general in the National Guard of the United States and former Adjutant General of Wisconsin.

== Early life and education ==
Blaney was born in Ontario, Canada and attended high school in Kendall, Wisconsin. He earned a B.S. degree in physical education from the University of Wisconsin–La Crosse in 1964 and then an M.S. degree in education in 1969. Blaney later graduated from courses at the United States Army Command and General Staff College in 1979 and the United States Army War College in 1984.

== Military career ==
Blaney originally enlisted in the military in 1960. He was commissioned an officer on July 7, 1963. He was a commandant at Camp Williams and also a colonel with the 32nd Infantry Brigade Combat Team. Blaney became Adjutant General of Wisconsin in August 1997 and was promoted to major general on September 30, 1997.

Awards Blaney has received include the Distinguished Service Medal, the Legion of Merit, the Meritorious Service Medal with three oak leaf clusters, the Army Commendation Medal, the Army Reserve Components Achievement Medal with oak leaf cluster, the National Defense Service Medal with service star, the Armed Forces Reserve Medal with gold hourglass device, the Army Service Ribbon, and the Army Reserve Components Overseas Training Ribbon.

== Personal ==
Blaney was the son of Alexander F. Blaney and Ethel (O'Rourke) Blaney. He had a brother and two sisters.

Blaney married Ramona Kane in Woodstock, Illinois on April 26, 1991. His civilian occupation was as a physical education instructor and he had two sons.

Blaney and his wife lived in Oconomowoc, Wisconsin after his retirement. He died in Jefferson, Wisconsin in 2020.
