= Sandra Blain =

American ceramicist (1941–2024)

Sandra Jean Blain
- Born: 1941; Chicago, Illinois, U.S.
- Died: December 19, 2024 (aged 82–83); Tempe, Arizona, U.S.
- Other name: Sandy Blain
- Education: Northern Illinois University (BS), University of Wisconsin–Milwaukee (MS, MFA)
- Occupations: Ceramicist, potter, sculptor, educator
- Awards: honorary fellow of American Craft Council (1997)
- Website: www.sandyblain.com

Sandra Jean Blain (1941 – 2024) was an American ceramicist, sculptor, and educator known for her hand built and thrown pottery. Blain served as the World Crafts Council's 1978 U.S. delegate to Japan, taught at the University of Tennessee, and served as director at Arrowmont School of Arts and Crafts. She lives in Arizona.

== Biography ==
Sandra Jean Blain was born in 1941, in Chicago. She received a B.S. degree (1964) in education from Northern Illinois University in Dekalb, as well as an M.S. degree (1967) in art and a M.F.A degree (1972) in ceramics from the University of Wisconsin–Milwaukee.

She was faculty at the University of Tennessee in Knoxville, Tennessee (from 1969 to 2004). Blain was the director at Arrowmont School of Arts and Crafts in Gatlinburg, Tennessee (from 1980 to 2001). She served as the World Crafts Council's 1978 U.S. delegate to Japan. Blain also served on the board for the International Ceramic Symposium.

In 1997, Blain was named an honorary fellow by the American Craft Council.

Blain died of cancer on December 19, 2024, in Tempe, Arizona.
