= The Feminist Companion to Literature in English =

Biographical dictionary of women writers

The Feminist Companion to Literature in English: Women Writers from the Middle Ages to the Present is a biographical dictionary about women writers.

Companion was edited by Virginia Blain, Patricia Clements, and Isobel Grundy. It was published in 1990 by Batsford (now Pavilion Books) in the UK and Yale University Press in the US. It took about ten years to complete and was based mainly on research completed specifically for the project.

Companion includes about 2,700 entries about women writers and associated topics such as genres and literary movements. Only writing in English is covered but the project's geographic scope is wide. Temporally, Companion covers writers from the Middle Ages to about 1985.

Entries focus on biographical details over literary criticism, seeking to show the lives from which women's writing emerged. The editors included entries on writing not typically considered literary, such as diaries and letters, in order to counteract received narratives of what literature can be. Companion emphasizes women's relationships with one another and lists mothers before fathers when describing a subject's parentage.

Collaborators on Companion later created Orlando: Women's Writing in the British Isles from the Beginnings to the Present, an online reference source about women's writing published by Cambridge University Press.

== Works cited ==
- Barry, Peter (September 1991). "Taking Up References". English: Journal of the English Association. 40 (168): 275–284. doi:10.1093/english/40.168.275. ISSN 0013-8215.
- Harris, Jocelyn (1992). "Review of The Feminist Companion to Literature in English". Tulsa Studies in Women's Literature. 11 (2): 383–386. doi:10.2307/464316. JSTOR 464316.
