= Blaine County =

Blaine County is the name of four counties in the United States; each one is named for American statesman and politician James G. Blaine (1830–1893):

- Blaine County, Idaho
- Blaine County, Montana
- Blaine County, Nebraska
- Blaine County, Oklahoma

It is also the name of a fictional county in Grand Theft Auto V:

- Blaine County, San Andreas
