= Blaine (surname) =

People with the surname Blaine include:

- Barbara Blaine (1956–2017), founder and president of Survivors Network of those Abused by Priests (SNAP), a U.S. advocacy group for survivors
- Catharine Paine Blaine (1829–1907), American suffragist and teacher
- Dan Blaine (1891–1958), American football player and National Football League team owner
- David Blaine (born 1973), American illusionist and stunt performer
- Ed Blaine (1940–2026), American National Football League player and pharmaceutical researcher
- Ephraim Blaine (1741–1804), early Pennsylvania settler and commissary-general in the Continental Army
- Greg Blaine (born 1961), American politician, farmer, and businessman
- Hal Blaine (1929–2019), pop music drummer
- James G. Blaine (1830–1893), American politician, Speaker of the United States House of Representatives
- Jason Blaine (born 1980), Canadian country music singer and songwriter
- Jerry Blaine (1910–1973), American bandleader, label owner, record distributor and singer
- Jimmy Blaine (1924–1967), American radio and television performer, producer, and writer
- John J. Blaine (1875–1934), United States Senator and Governor of Wisconsin
- Marcie Blaine (born 1944), American singer
- Nell Blaine (1922–1996), American landscape painter and watercolorist
- Robert Stickney Blaine (1816–1897), English politician
- Suessa Baldridge Blaine (1860–1932), American writer of temperance pageants
- Vivian Blaine (1921–1995), American actress and singer

Fictional characters include:

- Amory Blaine, protagonist of F. Scott Fitzgerald's 1920 novel This Side of Paradise.
- Richard "Rick" Blaine, protagonist of the 1942 film Casablanca, played by Humphrey Bogart

== See also ==
- Blaine (given name)
- Blanes (surname)
- Blain (surname)
- Blane, surname
