= Isabella W. Blaney =

American suffragette

Isabella Williams Blaney
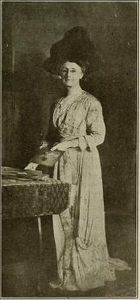
- Born: Isabella Williams; 1854; Chicago, Illinois, US
- Died: 1933 (aged 78–79); Santa Clara, California, US
- Spouse: Charles D. Blaney (m. 1877; died in 1923)

Isabella Williams Blaney (1854–1933) was active in progressive politics and the women's suffrage movement in California and was a delegate to both the Republican and Progressive National Conventions in 1912.

== Personal life ==
Isabella Williams was born in 1854 in Chicago, Illinois, to John Marshall Williams and Elizabeth Caroline Smith of Evanston, Illinois. She married Charles D. Blaney (1854–1923) on September 6, 1877, in Evanston, and in 1883 they moved to a large ranch in the Santa Clara Valley of California.

They had a child, Clarissa Butler Blaney, who died in 1901 of typhoid fever at age 17. After the daughter's death, the Blaneys helped pay for the construction of an isolation ward at O'Connor Hospital in her memory.

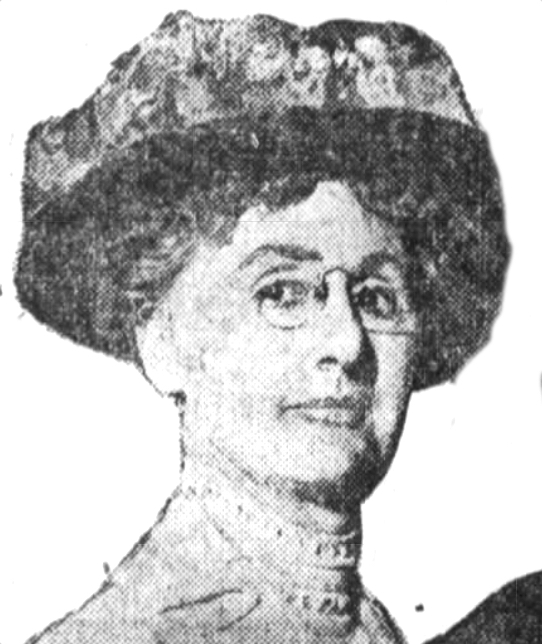
Blaney in 1912

Her husband dealt in real estate and was chairman of the first California Highway Commission. He died on July 24, 1923.

Isabella Blaney was said to have "traveled extensively, is interested in foreign missions and is the principal promoter, if not the founder, of a medical hospital in Northern China."

She died in Santa Clara on March 9, 1933, at the age of 80.

== Politics ==
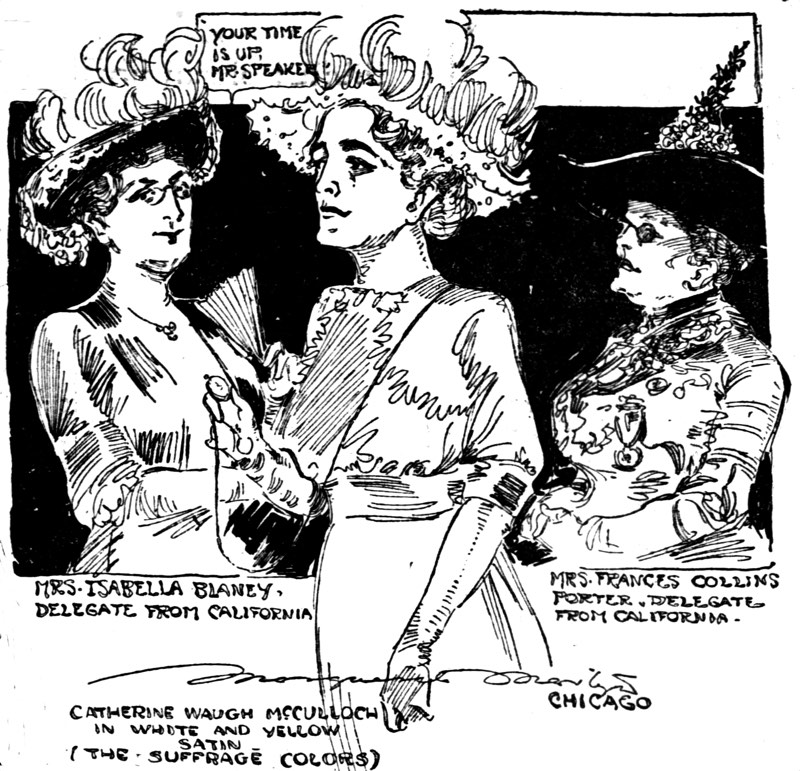
Catharine Waugh McCulloch, center, is flanked by Isabella W. Blaney and Frances Collins Porter, both of California, in this 1912 drawing by Marguerite Martyn. They were among the first women delegates to a Republican National Convention.

Blaney was vice president of the Club Women's Franchise League. In 1910 she supervised and financed a house-to-house canvass of the Santa Clara Valley on behalf of women's suffrage in a California special election on October 10, 1911. She was on the executive board of the California Equal Suffrage Association.

In November 1911, in what was called a "striking feature" she was chosen a vice president of the La Follette League of California, an honor given for the "new voter" (California women). Her name was greeted with "loud cheering" at the founding convention. She was the "first woman in California to be given a post in a partisan political organization."

She switched to Theodore Roosevelt after Senator Robert M. La Follette quit the presidential race.

Blaney and Florence Collins Porter were reported to have been the first women to be delegates to any national political convention, but that distinction actually went to Therese A. Jenkins, a Republican delegate in 1892. Asked how it felt to be the "first of their sex to cast votes in a national convention," she replied, "I just voted, that's all, and did not let myself be carried away by emotion at the time." She and the other Californians were bound by state law to vote for the winner of the primary election, Theodore Roosevelt. After Roosevelt lost the nomination to William Howard Taft, Blaney became a delegate to the Progressive Party convention that nominated Roosevelt on a separate ticket. She and three other women were elected by women delegates to serve on the party's National Committee.

As a member of the Progressive Party, Blaney supported John M. Eshleman in his successful 1914 bid for California lieutenant governor.

== Residences ==
For a time the Blaneys had a summer home in Pasadena. In her later life, Mrs. Blaney often stayed at the Fairmont Hotel in San Francisco.

The Blaney home in Saratoga, California, which cost $300,000 to build on the crest of a knoll and held a theater and ballroom, attracted newspaper attention when it was completed in 1918. The residence was the site of three one-act dramas dealing with the lives of American Indians, written by Hartley Alexander and directed by Marion Craig Wentworth in August 1927. The outdoor benefit was for the Indian Defense Association of Northern and Central California. The house was threatened in a fire in January 1932 caused by a defective flue. It was "believed to be doomed" because of the lack of water to fight the flames.

== Legacy ==
In 1925 Blaney funded a memorial pipe organ in the Saratoga Federated Church in honor of her late husband.

== See also ==
- List of suffragists and suffragettes
