= Mount Blane (Alberta) =

Mountain in Alberta, Canada

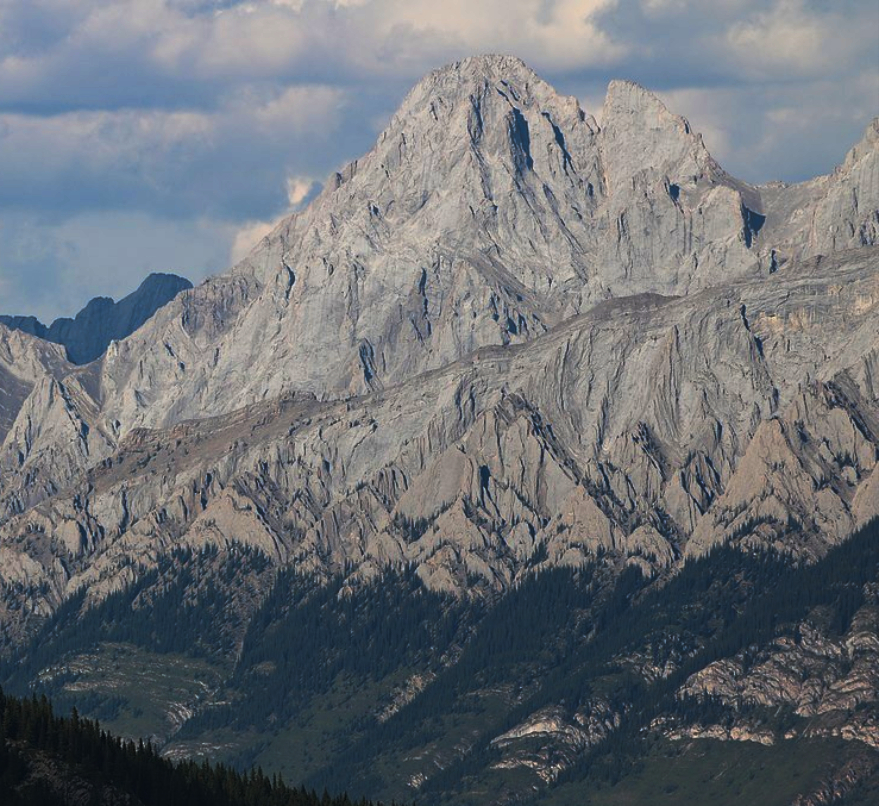
- Mount Blane, west face shown

Highest point
- Elevation: 2,993 m (9,820 ft)
- Prominence: 204 m (669 ft)
- Parent peak: Mount Jerram (2996 m)
- Listing: Mountains of Alberta
- Coordinates: 50°43′35″N 115°04′22″W

Geography
- Location within Alberta Location within Canada
- Location: Alberta, Canada
- Parent range: Opal Range; Canadian Rockies
- Topo map: NTS 82J11 Kananaskis Lakes

Geology
- Rock age: Cambrian
- Rock type: Limestone

Climbing
- First ascent: 1955 by P.J.B. Duffy, G. Hohnson, D. Kennedy, F. Koch

Mount Blane is a 2,993-metre (9,820-foot) mountain summit located in the Opal Range of the Canadian Rockies of Alberta, Canada. Its nearest higher peak is Mount Jerram, 3.3 km (2.1 mi) to the southeast.

== History ==
The mountain was named in honor of Sir Charles Rodney Blane (1879–1916), Royal Navy commander of the battlecruiser HMS Queen Mary. He was killed during the Battle of Jutland when his ship exploded and sank. The mountain's name was made official in 1922 by the Geographical Names Board of Canada.

The first ascent of the peak was made in 1955 by P.J.B. Duffy, G. Hohnson, D. Kennedy, and F. Koch. Koch perished during the descent.

== Geology ==
Mount Blane is composed of sedimentary rock laid down during the Precambrian to Jurassic periods. Formed in shallow seas, this sedimentary rock was pushed east and over the top of younger rock during the Laramide orogeny.

== Climate ==
Based on the Köppen climate classification, Mount Blane is located in a subarctic climate zone with cold, snowy winters, and mild summers. Temperatures can drop below −20 °C with wind chill factors below −30 °C.

In terms of favorable weather, June through September are the best months to climb Mount Blane.

Precipitation runoff from the west side of the mountain drains into the Kananaskis River, whereas the east side drains into tributaries of the Elbow River.

== See also ==
- List of mountains of Canada
