= William Blane =

William Blane FRS (1750 – 22 November 1835) was a British gentleman, landowner and author of miscellaneous articles.

== Biography ==
Born in Blanefield, near Kirkoswald, in Ayrshire, William Blane was a son of Gilbert Blane of Blanefield (d.1771) and Agnes McFadzen; Sir Gilbert Blane was one of William Blane's brothers. On 16 April 1795 Willam Blane was elected F.R.S. In 1802 he purchased Foliejon Park. He was the author of Essays on Hunting, which contains an account of the Mogul Empire Vizier's hunting expeditions. Blane also published in the Philosophical Transactions of the Royal Society a paper on the production of borax. One of his sons, William Newnham Blane (1800–1825), was the author of An excursion through the United States and Canada during the years 1822–1823.
