= Blaine B. Taylor =

American author, journalist, political aide, and Vietnam War veteran

Blaine Bruce Taylor (December 8, 1946 – April 5, 2021) was an American author, leading Second World War military and political historian, award-winning newspaper, magazine and medical journal writer-editor, political aide, and Vietnam War veteran. He wrote more than twenty books, primarily on the history of Nazi Germany, military history, transportation, political biography, and the assassination of President John F. Kennedy.

== Early life and education ==
Taylor was born in Washington, D.C., the son of Raymond Bernard Taylor, a streetcar conductor, and Sarah Mildred Taylor, and was raised in the Waverly neighborhood of Baltimore, Maryland. He attended Calvert Hall College High School and Towson High School before serving in the United States Army during the Vietnam War. After returning from military service, he earned a General Educational Development diploma and later received a bachelor's degree in history from Towson University.

== Military service ==
Taylor enlisted in the United States Army in 1966 and served in Vietnam with the 199th Light Infantry Brigade. Sources describe him as serving as both a soldier and military policeman and participating in combat operations. He received twelve military decorations, including the Combat Infantryman Badge.

== Career ==
Taylor worked as a newspaper reporter, magazine editor, medical journalist, freelance writer, copy editor, and public relations professional. He served as press secretary for several successful political campaigns in Maryland and was press secretary to U.S. Representative Helen Delich Bentley from 1991 to 1992. During his career, he also worked in advertising, public relations, banking, retail sales, publishing, and broadcasting. Taylor was active in veterans' organizations, including the Veterans of Foreign Wars and Vietnam Veterans of America. As a military historian and freelance writer, Taylor contributed articles to Warfare History Network on subjects including German military history, armored warfare, aviation, and the Second World War.

== Political activities ==
Taylor was a perennial political candidate and participated in numerous political campaigns. According to his 2016 U.S. Senate campaign biography, he served in elected and appointed positions in student government at Towson State College and later worked on successful political campaigns in Maryland and national politics. In 2016, Taylor sought the Democratic nomination for the United States Senate in Maryland.

== Authorship ==
Taylor authored twenty-three books on military history, German history, engineering, transportation, political biography, and related subjects. His works frequently focused on Nazi Germany and prominent figures of the Third Reich. His books included Hitler's Engineers: Master Builders of the Third Reich, Beer Hall Putsch to Blood Purge 1919–1934, Mrs. Adolf Hitler: The Eva Braun Photograph Albums, Kaiser Bill! A New Look at Germany's Last Emperor Wilhelm II 1859–1941, Reich Rails, Pearl Harbor, Bobby! From Robert F. Kennedy to RFK 1925–1968, and Dallas 50 Years On: The Murder of John F. Kennedy: A New Look at an Old Crime, 22 November 1963–2013. Taylor also wrote on the history of Mercedes-Benz and Volkswagen automobiles. At the time of his death, he was reportedly completing Rudolf Hess: Hitler's Winged Parsifal.

== Personal life ==
Taylor lived for many years in Towson, Maryland. He married twice, and both marriages ended in divorce.

== Death ==
Taylor died on April 5, 2021, at the Baltimore VA Medical Center due to complications from a stroke, aged 74. He was buried at Cheltenham Veterans Cemetery in Maryland on May 19, 2021.
