= Blaine Township, Adams County, Nebraska =

Blaine Township
- Township
- Location of Blaine Township within Nebraska
- Coordinates: 40°33′51″N 98°19′34″W
- Country: United States
- State: Nebraska
- County: Adams

Population (2010)
  - Total: 497
- Time zone: UTC-6 (Eastern)
  - Summer (DST): UTC-5 (Eastern)

Blaine Township is one of sixteen townships in Adams County, Nebraska, United States. The population was 497 at the 2010 census.

== See also ==
- County government in Nebraska
