= Blane (given name) =

Blane is a given name. Notable people with the name include:

- Blane Comstock (born 1949), American ice hockey player
- Blane De St. Croix (born 1954), American artist
- Blane Gaison (born 1958), American football player
- M. Blane Michael (1943–2011), American judge
- Blane Morgan (born 1977), American football coach
- Blane David Nordahl (born 1962), American cat burglar
- Blane Smith (born 1954), American football player
- Saint Blane (died 590), Scottish bishop and confessor
- Blane Muise (born 1993), English musician

Fictional characters named Blane include:

- Blane McDonnagh, a character portrayed by Andrew McCarthy in Pretty in Pink

== See also ==
- Blane (surname)
- Blaine (given name)
