= Blaine Township, Kearney County, Nebraska =

Blaine Township
- Township
- Location in Kearney County
- Coordinates: 40°35′02″N 099°07′21″W
- Country: United States
- State: Nebraska
- County: Kearney

Area
  - Total: 54.49 sq mi (141.12 km^{2})
  - Land: 54.46 sq mi (141.06 km^{2})
  - Water: 0.023 sq mi (0.06 km^{2}) 0.04%
- Elevation: 2,172 ft (662 m)

Population (2020)
  - Total: 621
  - Density: 11.4/sq mi (4.40/km^{2})
- GNIS feature ID: 0837884

Blaine Township is one of fourteen townships in Kearney County, Nebraska, United States. The population was 621 at the 2020 census. A 2021 estimate placed the township's population at 620.

== See also ==
- County government in Nebraska
