= Virginia Blain =

Australian literary scholar

Virginia Blain is an Australian feminist literary scholar.

She was Associate Professor of Victorian and Edwardian literature at Macquarie University, retiring in 2006 when it was noted in The Australian that "in a farewell gesture to the University, [she] rode her Arabian stallion around the lake".

She was the first chair of the Jessie Street National Women's Library, founded in 1989.

She co-edited The Feminist Companion to Literature in English: Women's Writing from the Middle Ages to the Present in 1990 with Patricia Clements and Isobel Grundy.

Her publications included Caroline Bowles Southey, 1786-1854: The Making of a Woman Writer, about Caroline Bowles Southey, poet, painter and the second wife of the poet Robert Southey.

In 2015 she was active in the Archives Committee of the Arabian Horse Society of Australia, making oral history recordings of the older breeders with plans to transfer the tapes to computer.

== Selected publications ==
- Blain, Virginia (2019). Caroline Bowles Southey: 1786 - 1854 , the Making of a Woman Writer. Taylor & Francis Group. ISBN 9780429459375.
- Grundy, Isobel; Blain, Virginia; Clements, Patricia (1990). The Feminist Companion to Literature in English. B.T. Batsford Ltd. ISBN 071347291X.
- Blain, Virginia (January 2004). "Queer Empathy: or, Reading/Writing the Queer in Victorian Poetry". Literature Compass. 1 (1). doi:10.1111/j.1741-4113.2004.00059.x.
- Blain, Virginia (2001). Victorian women poets: a new anthology. New York: Longman. ISBN 978-0582275683.
- Armstrong, Isobel; Blain, Virginia (1999). Women’s Poetry, Late Romantic to Late Victorian. Palgrave. ISBN 978-0333690796.
