= Blaine Township, Antelope County, Nebraska =

Blaine Township
- Township
- Location in Antelope County
- Coordinates: 42°13′17″N 098°07′52″W
- Country: United States
- State: Nebraska
- County: Antelope

Area
  - Total: 35.82 sq mi (92.77 km^{2})
  - Land: 35.81 sq mi (92.76 km^{2})
  - Water: 0.0039 sq mi (0.01 km^{2}) 0.01%
- Elevation: 1,916 ft (584 m)

Population (2010)
  - Total: 148
  - Density: 4.1/sq mi (1.6/km^{2})
- GNIS feature ID: 0837882

Blaine Township is one of twenty-four townships in Antelope County, Nebraska, United States. The population was 148 at the 2010 census.

== See also ==
- County government in Nebraska
