= Blaine Township, Cuming County, Nebraska =

Blaine Township
- Township
- Location in Cuming County
- Coordinates: 42°02′24″N 096°57′59″W
- Country: United States
- State: Nebraska
- County: Cuming

Area
  - Total: 35.81 sq mi (92.76 km^{2})
  - Land: 35.80 sq mi (92.72 km^{2})
  - Water: 0.015 sq mi (0.04 km^{2}) 0.04%
- Elevation: 1,581 ft (482 m)

Population (2020)
  - Total: 136
  - Density: 3.80/sq mi (1.47/km^{2})
- GNIS feature ID: 0837883

Blaine Township is one of sixteen townships in Cuming County, Nebraska, United States. The population was 136 at the 2020 census. A 2021 estimate placed the township's population at 135.

== See also ==
- County government in Nebraska
