= Ignace (name) =

Name of French origin

Ignace is a surname and given name of French origin. It can also be combined with other common given names and surnames. Notable people with the name include:

== Given names ==
- Ignace Abdo Khalifé (1914–1998), Lebanese-Australian Jesuit
- Ignace Baguibassa Sambar-Talkena (1935–2013), Togolese Roman Catholic bishop
- Ignace Beck (1896–?), Indian politician
- Ignace Bourget (1799–1885), Canadian Roman Catholic priest
- Ignace Brice (1795–1866), Belgian painter
- Ignace Caseneuve (1747–1806), French politician and constitutional bishop
- Ignace Cotolendi (1630–1662), French bishop
- Ignace De Graeve (1940–2016), Belgian artist
- Ignace Despontreaux Marion (1772–1831), Haitian military officer in the Haitian Revolution
- Ignace Dubus-Bonnel (1794-?), French craftsman
- Ignace François Broutin (1690–1751), French military officer and commander
- Ignace Fougeron, British engraver
- Ignace Gata Mavita wa Lufuta (born 1949), Congolese diplomat
- Ignace Gelb (1907–1985), Polish-American ancient historian and Assyriologist
- Ignace Gibsone (1826–1897), English concert pianist and composer
- Ignace Gill (1808–1865), Canadian businessman and political figure
- Ignace Guédé-Gba (1964–2021), Ivorian footballer
- Ignace Heinrich (1925–2003), French athlete
- Ignace Hellenberg (died 2004), French art dealer
- Ignace Henri Jean Théodore Fantin-Latour (1836–1904), French painter
- Ignace Jang (born 1969), Korean-French violinist
- Ignace Kowalczyk (1913–1996), German footballer representing the French national team
- Ignace Lepp (1909–1966), Estonian-French writer
- Ignace Leybach (1817–1891), French pianist, organist, music educator and composer
- Ignace Mandjambi (born 1940), Congolese cyclist
- Ignace Matondo Kwa Nzambi (1932–2011), Congolese Roman Catholic bishop
- Ignace Mentour, Indigenous guide and namesake of Ignace, Ontario
- Ignace Michiels (born 1963), Belgian organist, choral conductor and organ teacher
- Ignace Mobarak (1876–1958), Lebanese Maronite Catholic bishop
- Ignace Moleka (born 1978), Congolese footballer
- Ignace Morgenstern (1900–1961), Hungarian-born French film producer
- Ignace Murwanashyaka (1963–2019), leader of the Democratic Forces for the Liberation of Rwanda
- Ignace Nau (1808–1845), Haitian poet and storyteller
- Ignace Raad (1923–1999), Lebanese Archbishop
- Ignace Reiss (1899–1937), Soviet spy
- Ignace Schetz de Grobbendonk (1625–1680), Belgian bishop
- Ignace Schops (born 1964), Belgian environmentalist
- Ignace Schott (1818–1883), French artist, etcher and teacher
- Ignace Strasfogel (1909–1994), Polish pianist, composer and conductor
- Ignace Tiegerman (1893–1968), Polish pianist and teacher
- Ignace Tirkey (born 1981), Indian field hockey player
- Ignace Tonené (1840/1841–1916), Indigenous Canadian tribal chief
- Ignace Van Der Brempt (born 2002), Belgian footballer
- Ignace von Ephrussi (1829–1899), Russian-born Austrian banker and diplomat
- Charles-Ignace Gill (1844–1901), Canadian lawyer and political figure
- Gaspard-Théodore-Ignace de la Fontaine (1787–1871), Luxembourgish politician and jurist
- Jacques-Ignace de La Touche (1694–1781), French painter
- Jean-Louis-Ignace de La Serre (1662–1756), French novelist
- Joseph-Ignace Aumond (1810–1879), Canadian lumber merchant
- Joseph-Ignace Guillotin (1738–1814), French physician, politician and freemason
- Ignace-François de Glymes-Brabant, Lord of la Falize (1677–1755), Flemish general
- Ignace-Gaston Pardies (1636–1673), French Catholic priest and scientist
- Ignace-Michel-Louis-Antoine d'Irumberry de Salaberry (1752–1828), Canadian politician
- Ignace-Nicolas Vincent (1769–1844), the Grand Chief of the Hurons of Lorette from 1811 to 1844
- Philippe-Ignace François Aubert de Gaspé (1814–1841), Canadian writer
- Pierre-Ignace Aubert de Gaspé (1758–1823), Canadian seigneur and political figure

== Middle names ==
- Antoine Ignace Melling (1763–1831), German-French painter
- Charles Ignace Adelard Gill (1871–1918), Canadian artist
- Charles Ignace Plichon (1814–1888), French lawyer, businessman and politician
- Claude Ignace François Michaud (1751–1835), French military commander
- Édouard Ignace Andlauer (1830–1909), French composer and organist
- François Ignace Schaal (1747–1833), French general and statesman
- Jacques Ignace Hittorff (1792–1867), French architect
- Jean Ignace de La Ville (1690–1774), French churchman and diplomat
- Jean Ignace Isidore Gérard Grandville (1803–1847), French illustrator and caricaturist
- Joseph Ignace Randrianasolo (1947–2010), Malagasy Roman Catholic bishop
- Konan Ignace Jocelyn N'Dri (born 2000), Ivorian footballer
- Ladislas Ignace de Bercheny (1689–1778), Hungarian-born French marshal
- Léon Joseph Marie Ignace Degrelle (1906–1994), Belgian Walloon politician and Nazi collaborator
- Paul François Ignace de Barlatier de Mas (1739–1807), French naval captain
- Paul Ignace Mella, Tanzanian Lieutenant General
- Philippe Xavier Ignace Barbarin (born 1950), French Roman Catholic prelate
- Pierre Ignace Liévin van Alstein (1733–1793), French slave trader
- Walter Ignace d'Hondt (born 1936), Canadian rower and Olympic champion

== Surnames ==
- Lucie Ignace (born 1992), French karateka
- Marianne Ignace (born 1954), Canadian linguist and anthropologist
- Henri de Saint-Ignace (1630–1719/1720), Belgian Carmelite theologian
- Jeanne-Françoise Juchereau de la Ferté de Saint-Ignace (1650–1723), Canadian hospitaller nun
- Marie Guenet de Saint-Ignace (1610–1646), French-Canadian abbess and hospital manager

== See also ==
- Ignacio (Spanish variant)
- Ignacy (Polish variant)
- Ignatius
- Ignaz (German variant)
- Ignazio (Italian variant)
