= 2011 Nobel Prize in Literature =

- Tomas Tranströmer
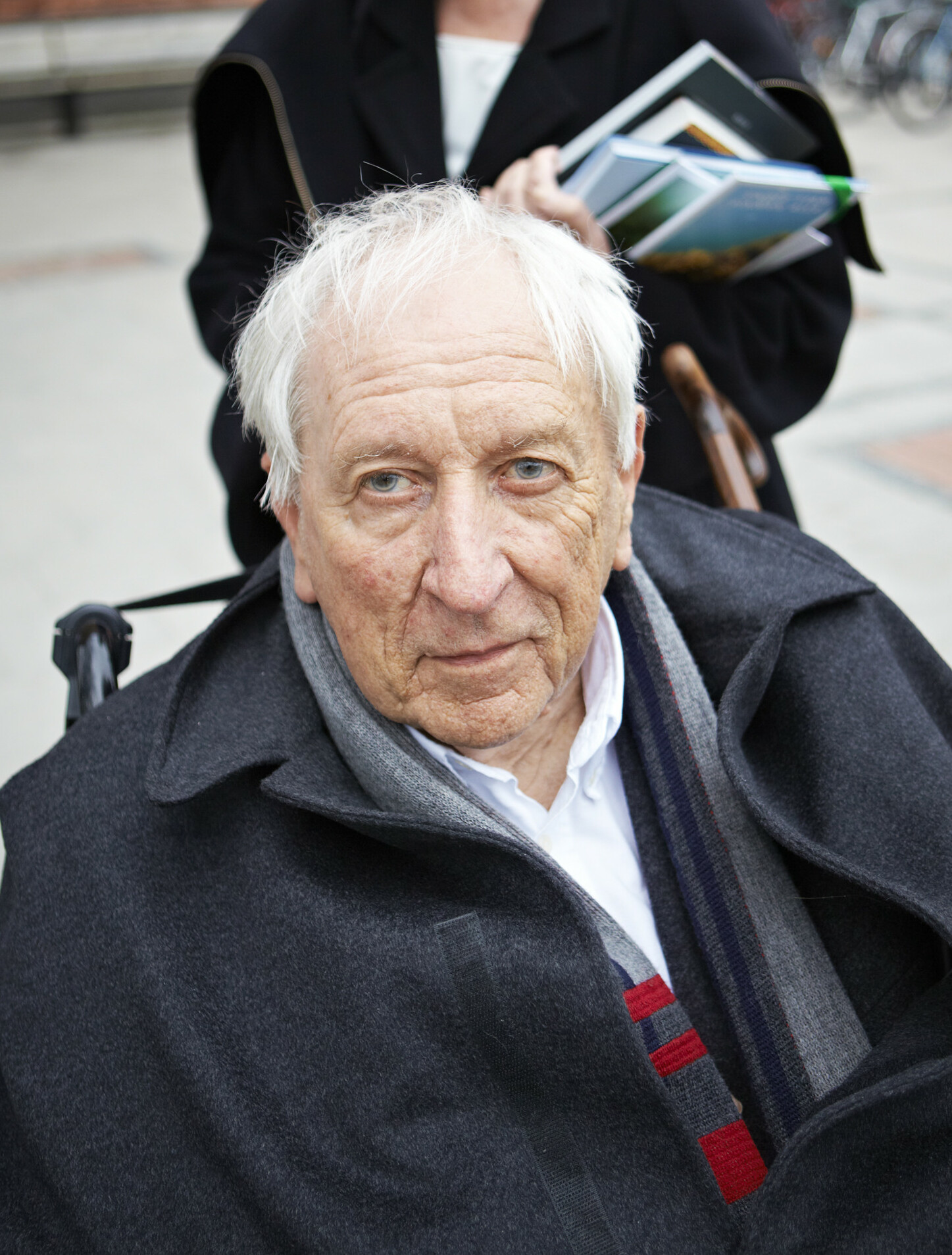
- "because, through his condensed, translucent images, he gives us fresh access to reality."
- Date: 6 October 2011 (announcement); 10 December 2011 (ceremony)
- Location: Stockholm, Sweden
- Presented by: Swedish Academy
- First award: 1901
- Website: Official website

The 2011 Nobel Prize in Literature was awarded to the Swedish poet Tomas Tranströmer (1931–2015) "because, through his condensed, translucent images, he gives us fresh access to reality." He is the seventh Swedish author to become a recipient of the prize after Harry Martinson and Eyvind Johnson were jointly awarded in 1974.

== Laureate ==
Tomas Tranströmer is noted for his ability to draw out the great and wonderful from the mundane. Since his writing debut in the 1950s with 17 dikter ("17 Poems", 1954) and Hemligheter på vägen ("Secrets on the Way", 1958), Tranströmer's poetry has been characterized by its "everyday roots", and a striving after simplicity that allows room for its reader to marvel and to concentrate. Critics have lauded his poems for their rich, keen and original imagery. Two of Tranströmer's greatest interests, nature and music, have also left deep impressions on his writing. His literary collections include Östersjöar ("Baltics", 1974), För levande och döda ("For the Living and the Dead", 1989), Sorgegondolen ("The Sorrow Gondola", 1996), and Den stora gåtan ("The Great Enigma", 2004).

== Candidates ==
Tranströmer had been considered a perennial frontrunner, together with the Syrian poet Adunis, for the award in years past, with reporters waiting near his residence on the day of the announcement in prior years. The Swedish Academy revealed that he had been nominated every single year since 1993.

Other authors tipped to win that same year were the Japanese writer Haruki Murakami, Algerian writer Assia Djebar, American novelists Joyce Carol Oates, Thomas Pynchon, and Cormac McCarthy, Hungarian writer Péter Nádas, Indian poets Rajendra Bhandari and K. Satchidanandan, South Korean Ko Un, Australian poet Les Murray, Romanian novelist Mircea Cărtărescu, Somali novelist Nuruddin Farah, British fantasy author J. K. Rowling, and American singer-songwriter Bob Dylan.

== Prize motivation ==
The Nobel Committee stated that Tranströmer's work received the prize "because, through his condensed, translucent images, he gives us fresh access to reality."

Permanent secretary of the Swedish Academy Peter Englund said, "He's been writing poetry since 1951 when he made his debut. And has quite a small production, really. He's writing about big questions. He's writing about death, he's writing about history and memory, and nature."

== Reactions ==
Tranströmer's wife, Monica, said he had been notified by telephone four minutes before the announcement was made, and that Tranströmer was "surprised, very surprised".

The choice of Tranströmer was widely celebrated in Sweden. "It is tremendously well deserved", author Björn Ranelid said, "He should have been awarded the prize much earlier." Åsa Linderborg, cultural editor of Aftonbladet said "He is easy to read and his themes are universal", describing Tranströmers imagery as "incomparable". Prime Minister of Sweden Fredrik Reinfeldt said he was "happy and proud" at the news of Tranströmer's achievement. Meanwhile, international response to the award has been mixed. The choice of Tranströmer was celebrated by Irish poet Paul Muldoon and Teju Cole, while it provoked negative reactions from American commentators who criticized the Swedish Academy for eurocentrism and, despite the fact that Tranströmer's poetry had been translated to more than 50 languages, for awarding "obscure" writers little known outside their home countries. French commentators described Tranströmer as "practically unknown in France" and a surprise choice, while Thomas Steinfeld, cultural editor of German Süddeutsche Zeitung said it was "A very good decision", calling Tranströmer "one of the worlds greatest poets". Positive reactions were also heard from around the world, such as Joumana Haddad, cultural editor of the Lebanese Al-Nahar, who welcomed the prize to "a great literary person", and Celal Üster, cultural chief of Turkish Cumhuriyet, who was pleased that the prize was awarded to a poet and "a true writer who does not seek attention for himself". Darryll Accone, literature editor of South African Mail and Guardian said he was "somewhat puzzled" that the Syrian poet Adonis was not awarded instead of Tranströmer. The prize announcement led to the immediate reissuing of at least two volumes of Tranströmer's poetry in English translation.
