= John Glassco Translation Prize =

- Awarded for: best translation into English or French by a Canadian writer
- Country: Canada
- Presented by: Literary Translators' Association of Canada
- First award: 1982
- Website: https://www.attlc-ltac.org/en/john-glassco-prize/

The John Glassco Translation Prize is an annual Canadian literary award, presented by the Literary Translators' Association of Canada to a book judged the year's best translation into either English or French of a work originally written in any language. The winning writer is awarded $1,000 and a free membership to LTAC.

== Winners ==
- 1982 - Susanne de Lotbinière-Harwood, Neons in the Night (Lucien Francœur, selected poetry)
- 1983 - Michèle Venet and Jean Lévesque, L'Invasion du Canada (Pierre Berton, The Invasion of Canada and Flames Across the Border)
- 1984 - Barbara Mason, Description of San Marco (Michel Butor, Déscription de San Marco)
- 1985 - Wayne Grady, Christopher Cartier of Hazelnut, Also Known as Bear (Antonine Maillet, Christophe Cartier de la Noisette dit Nounours)
- 1986 - Carole Noël, On n'en meurt pas (Olga Boutenko, unpublished manuscript)
- 1987 - Liedewy Hawke, Hopes and Dreams: The Diary of Henriette Dessaulles 1874-1881 (Henriette Dessaulles, Fadette: Journal d'Henriette Dessaulles 1874-1880)
- 1988 - Heather Parker, Juliette (Michel Goeldin, Juliette crucifiée)
- 1989 - Charlotte Melançon, Shakespeare et son théâtre (Northrop Frye, Northrop Frye on Shakespeare)
  - Honourable Mention - Donald Winkler, Rose and Thorn: Selected poems of Roland Giguère (Roland Giguère, selected poetry)
- 1990 - Daniel McBain, Cocori (Joaquín Gutiérrez)
- 1991 - Matt Cohen, The Secret Voice (Gaétan Brulotte, Le Surveillant)
- 1992 - Bruno Guévin, No 44, le mystérieux étranger (Mark Twain, The Mysterious Stranger)
  - Honourable Mention: Richard Tardif, Tonnerre noir (Arna Bontemps, Black Thunder)
- 1993 - Lori Saint-Martin and Paul Gagné, Ana Historique (Daphne Marlatt, Ana Historic)
  - Honourable Mention: Pierre Anctil, Poèmes yiddish / Yidishe lieder (Jacob Isaac Segal)
- 1994 - Claire Rothman, The Influence of a Book (Philippe-Ignace François Aubert de Gaspé, L'influence d'un livre)
- 1995 - Florence Bernard, Cet heritage au gout de sel (Alistair MacLeod, The Lost Salt Gift of Blood)
- 1996 - Bodil Jelhof Jensen, Dilemma (Agnes Jelhof Jensen)
- 1997 - Don Coles, For the Living and the Dead (Tomas Tranströmer, För Levande och Döda)
- 1998 - Diego Bastianutti, A Major Selection of the Poetry of Giuseppe Ungaretti (Giuseppe Ungaretti, Vita d'un uomo. Tutte le poesie)
- 1999 - Jill Cairns, The Indiscernible Movement (Aude, Cet imperceptible mouvement)
- 2000 - Chava Rosenfarb, Bociany and Of Lodz and Love (own work)
  - Honourable Mention: Rachelle Renaud, Any Mail? and other stories (Gérald Tougas)
- 2001 - Agnès Guitard, Les hauturiers (Farley Mowat, The Farfarers)
  - Honourable Mention: S. E. Stewart, The Setting Lake Sun (J. R. Léveillé, Le soleil du lac qui se couche)
- 2002 - Ook Chung, Le champ électrique (Kerri Sakamoto, The Electrical Field)
- 2003 - Yolande Amzallag, Le canari éthique. Science, société et esprit humain (Margaret Somerville, The Ethical Canary: Science, Society and the Human Spirit)
- 2004 - Emmy Bos, La chambre d'amis (Marcel Möring, Modelvliegen)
  - Honourable Mention - Hélène Garrett, Haiku in Papiamentu (Elis Juliana)
- 2005 - Benoit Léger, Miracles en série (Carol Shields, Various Miracles)
- 2006 - Francis Catalano, Instructions pour la lecture d'un journal (Valerio Magrelli, Didascalie per la lettura di un giornale)
  - Honourable mention: Joan Irving, Caribou Hunter: A Song of a Vanished Innu Life (Serge Bouchard, Récits de Mathieu Mestokosho, chasseur innu)
- 2007 - Marie Frankland, La chaise berçante (A. M. Klein, The Rocking Chair)
- 2008 - Caroline Larue, La prophétie d'Ophelia (Elaine Arsenault, Ophelia's Prophecy)
  - Honourable mention: Daniel Canty, Pierre blanche: Poèmes d'Alice (Stephanie Bolster, White Stone: The Alice Poems)
- 2009 - no prize
- 2010 - Louis Bouchard and Marie-Elisabeth Morf, D’ailleurs (Verena Stefan, Fremdschläfer)
- 2011 - Casey Roberts, Break Away: Jessie on My Mind (Sylvain Hotte, Panache)
- 2012 - no prize
- 2013 - Madeleine Stratford, Ce qu'il faut dire a des fissures (Tatiana Oroño, Lo que hay que decir tiene grieta)
- 2014 - Stéphanie Roesler, Helleborus et Alchémille (Elana Wolff, selected poetry)
- 2015 - Marietta Morry and Lynda Muir, As the Lilacs Bloomed (Anna Molnár Hegedűs)
- 2016 - no prize
- 2017 - Catherine Leroux, Corps conducteurs (Sean Michaels, Us Conductors)
- 2018 - Sauline Letendre, Rouge, jaune et vert (Alejandro Saravia, Rojo, amarillo y verde)
- 2019 - Rémi Labrecque, Mes souliers me fonts mourir (Robyn Sarah, My Shoes Are Killing Me)
- 2020 - Louis Hamelin, Les été de l’ourse (Muriel Wylie Blanchet,The Curve of Times)
- 2021 - Luba Markovskaia, Notes de terrain pour la toundra alpine (Elena Johnson, Field Notes for the Alpine Tundra)
- 2022 - Louise Gaudette, Dernière heure (K. D. Miller, Late Breaking)
- 2023 - D.M. Bradford, House Within a House (Nicholas Dawson, Désormais, ma demeure)
- 2024 - Yilin Wang , The Lantern and the Night Moths
