= Carin Bartosch Edström =

Swedish composer and author (born 1965)

Carin Bartosch Edström (born 1965 in Malmö) is a Swedish composer and author, and is especially interested in opera.

== Biography ==
Bartosch Edström had an international upbringing. Though she spent some time in the United States, she lived in Rome, Italy and Lund, Sweden for most of her childhood. While in Italy, she received voice training.

Bartosch Edström studied composition with Rolf Martinsson, Hans Gefors, Lars Ekström, Lars-Erik Rosell, and Sven-David Sandström. She graduated from Lund University's Malmö Academy of Music in 1999 with a degree in composition. She founded the Skanör/Falsterbo chamber music festival and was director of the Musica Vitae chamber music orchestra in Växjö from 1990 to 1992. In 2000, she was elected to the Society of Swedish Composers.

In 2011, Edström's debut crime novel, Furioso, was published. It followed the action surrounding the lives of a Swedish female string quartet.

== Compositions ==
Stage

- Trassel på tråden, Opera (1999); libretto by the composer
- Huvudsaken (The Main Thing), Opera in one act (2005); libretto by Kerstin Perski

Orchestral

- Playtime for string orchestra (1996)

Wind band

- Cyd Cybersonix Meets Webby Web Webster (1998)

Concertante

- Kansas Epidemix for violin, cello and string orchestra (1994)
- Luce promessa for cello and orchestra (1996)

Chamber and instrumental music

- Persephone's Dream for flute and piano (1988)
- Claudia Goes Shopping for recorder (1995)
- Fluctuat nec mergitur for violin, viola, cello and piano (1995)
- Happiness Is a G-String for solo viola (1996)
- Redan morgon! (As Soon as Tomorrow!) for solo clarinet (2004)
- Asthmose for 2 violins (2006)

Vocal

- Astrakanerna, 4 Songs for soprano, violin and cello (1996); words by Marie Lundquist
- Sorgegondolen, Song Cycle for soprano, bass clarinet and piano (1996); based on The Sorrow Gondola by Tomas Tranströmer
- Sommer-Refektorium for soprano, violin, viola, cello and percussion (1998)
- September 1918, 3 Songs for soprano and violin (1999) or for soprano and piano (2004); words by Edith Södergran
- Fyra nattliga sånger (Four Nocturnal Songs) for alto and piano (2011); words by Edith Södergran

Choral

- Winterweihe for mixed chorus a cappella (1997); words by Henkell

== Novels ==
- Furioso (2011)
