= Hellenberg =

Hellenberg is a surname. Notable people with the surname include:

- Freja Hellenberg (born 1989), Swedish footballer
- Ignace Hellenberg (died 2004), French art dealer
