= The Great Enigma =

Book by Tomas Tranströmer

- First edition cover
- Author: Tomas Tranströmer
- Original title: Den stora gåtan
- Translator: Robin Fulton
- Language: Swedish
- Publisher: Albert Bonniers förlag
- Publication date: 19 March 2004
- Publication place: Sweden
- English publication date: 2006
- Pages: 87
- ISBN: 9100103101

The Great Enigma (Swedish: Den stora gåtan) is a 2004 collection of poetry by the Swedish writer Tomas Tranströmer. It consists of five poems in free format, followed by 45 haiku in eleven suites. It is one of the two collections Tranströmer wrote after his 1990 stroke, and it was therefore written at a slow pace with the left hand. It was published in English in 2006.

== Content ==
Five free-form poems are followed by 45 which follow the form of the haiku, organised into eleven suites. The suites are loosely organised by genre and themes, which include the carpe diem motif, theistic epiphanies, nature depictions, snapshots from travels and reflections on death. The themes frequently blend.

== Genesis ==
In November 1990, Tomas Tranströmer suffered a stroke which paralysed the right side of his body and damaged his ability to speak. He therefore had to cancel a large-scale poetry project he was working on, about the history of Europe, to instead write more concise poems. Several times he considered to quit writing altogether, but kept coming up with new ideas. He returned to the haiku format, which he according to himself had been both reading and writing for his whole life. His earliest published haiku were written in 1959, when he worked at a youth prison, and in 1996 he published the collection The Sorrow Gondola which contained eleven more. The next eight years he continued to write the same way, with his left hand and at a slow pace. The haiku in The Great Enigma were not written with a strict adherence to classic conventions, but do follow the rule of three lines with five, seven and five syllables. The main inspirations for the poems were travelling, death and dreams.

== Publication ==
The book was published in Sweden on 19 March 2004 by Albert Bonniers förlag. The cover is a painting by the artist Peter Frie which was selected by Tranströmer. In April the book was released on CD, read by actor Krister Henriksson, and accompanied by Tranströmer on piano, performing bits by Josef Mattias Hauer, Federico Mompou, Maurice Karkoff, Cor de Groot and Werner Wolf Glaser with his left hand. The collection was translated to English by Robin Fulton, and first appeared in the 2006 volume The Great Enigma: New Collected Poems.

== Reception ==
Svenska Dagbladet's critic wrote: "When reading [the first five poems] you are delighted by the natural easiness which always has characterised Tranströmer's poetry, in the following haikus by the formal restraint and discipline which makes up the other side of his authorship - not a word too much!" The critic continued: "Tranströmer's new poems are permeated by a completely natural piety. No high tones, no preachment! Only a calm confidence before mortality and a through and through unsentimentally formulated gratitude for being able to exist, to participate."

The book was nominated for the August Prize. In 2007, Frie, whose painting is on the book's cover, collaborated with Tranströmer and exhibited 13 original landscape paintings inspired by the book.

== See also ==
- 2004 in poetry
- Swedish literature
