= Aubert de Gaspé =

The Aubert de Gaspé family was a French Canadian family descended from Charles Aubert de La Chesnaye, with several notable members:

- Ignace-Philippe Aubert de Gaspé (1714–1787), army officer
- Pierre-Ignace Aubert de Gaspé (1758–1823), politician, seigneur and son of Ignace-Philippe
- Philippe-Joseph Aubert de Gaspé (1786–1871), writer and son of Pierre-Ignace
- Philippe-Ignace François Aubert de Gaspé (1814–1841), writer and son of Philippe-Joseph
