= Hillenburg (surname) =

Hillenburg is a German surname. It may have originated as a variant spelling of Hallenberg, a habitational surname referring to Hallenberg, North Rhine-Westphalia, Germany. Variant spellings of the surname include Hellenberg. The 2010 United States census found 555 people with the surname Hillenburg, making it the 39,607th-most-common name in the country. This represented an increase from 519 people (39,824th-most-common) in the 2000 United States census. In both censuses, roughly 95% of the bearers of the surname identified as non-Hispanic white, and 2.3% as Hispanic or Latino of any race.

In 1940, Laborer and House Keeper were the top reported jobs for men and women in the USA named Hillenburg, where 47% of Hillenburg men were Laborer's and 46% of Hillenburg women were House Keepers.

Notable people with the surname include:

- Andy Hillenburg (born 1963), American racecar driver
- Dustin Hillenburg (born 2001), American racecar driver, son of Andy
- Rolf Kalmuczak (1938–2007), German crime novelist who sometimes used the pen name Martin Hillenburg
- Stephen Hillenburg (1961–2018), American animator who created the SpongeBob SquarePants series
