= Ignace =

Ignace may refer to:

- 11963 Ignace, main-belt asteroid
- Ignace (name), surname and given name of French origin
- Ignace, Ontario, township in Northwestern Ontario, Canada
- Ignace (film), 1937 film directed by Pierre Colombier
