= Monita Secreta =

Anti-Jesuit fabricated text

The Monita Secreta (also known as: Secret Instructions of the Jesuits, or the Secret Instructions of the Society of Jesus) is an alleged code of instructions from Claudio Acquaviva, the fifth general of the Society of Jesus, to its various superiors which claims to lay down methods to expand the power and influence of the Jesuit Order. Some Scholars regard the document as an anti-Jesuit forgery.

== Summary of Contents ==
According to the Monita, Jesuits are to use every means at their disposal to acquire wealth for the order. For instance, Jesuits are encouraged to entice promising young men to enter the order and endow it with their estates; rich widows are to be cajoled and dissuaded from remarriage. Every means is to be used for the advancement of Jesuits to bishoprics or other ecclesiastical dignities and to discredit the members of other orders, while the world is to be persuaded that the Society is animated by the purest and least interested motives: the reputation of those who quit it is to be assailed and maligned in every way.

== History ==
Scholars consider the Monita to be the work of one Jerome Zahorowski, a Pole, who, having been a member of the Society, had been expelled for disciplinary matters in 1613. They were first published in Kraków in 1615, purporting to be a translation from the Spanish, and were printed in the same city in 1614. Various stories were told regarding their discovery; they were most often associated with Duke Christian of Brunswick, despite the fact that he would have been only 15 years old at the time of their initial publication. The place where they were found was variously set down as Paderborn, Prague, Liège, Antwerp, Glatz, and on board a captured East Indiaman.

Attempts were likewise made at various times, as late even as 1783, to excite interest in the work as the result of a new discovery; there was also an undated edition, in the early nineteenth century, which professes to issue from the Propaganda Press, and to be authenticated by the testimonies of various Jesuit authorities. However, they are attributed to a general, "Felix Aconiti", who is completely unknown in the Annals of the Society of Jesus. The censor who purportedly approves the publication bears the name "Pasquinelli", while the titles which, it is alleged, should ensure the esteem of men in general for the Society, include all the crimes and abominations of every kind—immoralities, conspiracies, murders, and regicides—which the Jesuits' bitterest enemies have attributed to it.

== Debate about authenticity ==
Amongst those who have argued that the Monita are a hoax are Bishop Lipski of Cracow (1616), Bernhard Duhr in his Jesuiten Fablen, Fra Paolo Sarpi, the historian of the Council of Trent and Antoine Arnauld and the "Nouvelles Ecclesiastiques"; plus anti-Jesuits such as the Jansenists Henri de Saint-Ignace and Blaise Pascal, von Lang, Johann Joseph Ignaz von Döllinger, Friedrich (the author of Janus), Huber, and Reusch, as well as the Protestant historian Johann Karl Ludwig Gieseler. In the British House of Commons, during the debates on Catholic Emancipation, the fraudulent character of the Monita was acknowledged by more than one speaker, while the authorities of the British Museum and likewise the French bibliographer M. Barbier, agree in describing the work as "apocryphal".

Anglican Bishop of London Henry Compton was strongly opposed to Roman Catholicism, and in 1669 published an English translation of The Secret Instructions.

A defense was offered by Richard Frederick Littledale, opponent to Roman Catholicism, in his article "Jesuits", in the Encyclopædia Britannica of 1881. He claimed that the work is "both caricature and libel", but pleaded nevertheless that it was substantially true, since its author, "a shrewd and keen observer", having noticed how Jesuits actually worked, deduced from his observations the rules by which they were guided.

As against this case, John Gerard, writing in the Catholic Encyclopedia denies the authorship arguing that the official rules and constitutions of the Jesuits contradict these supposed instructions, for they expressly prohibit the acceptance of ecclesiastical dignities by its subjects, unless compelled by papal authority, and from the days of the founder, St. Ignatius Loyola, the Society has impeded such promotion. Gerard also argues that in many cases, genuine private instructions from the Jesuit general to subordinate superiors have fallen into hostile hands, which in many cases are found to give instructions directly contrary to those in the Monita.
