= Ook =

Ook, OoK or OOK may refer to:

- Ook Chung (born 1963), Korean-Canadian writer from Quebec
- On-off keying, in radio technology
- Toksook Bay Airport (IATA code OOK), in Alaska
- "Ook" (The Watch), a 2021 television episode
- Ook!, an esoteric programming language based on Brainfuck
- Ook, the mascot and name for Northern Alberta Institute of Technology sports teams
