= Hawaii Symphony =

American symphony orchestra in Honolulu

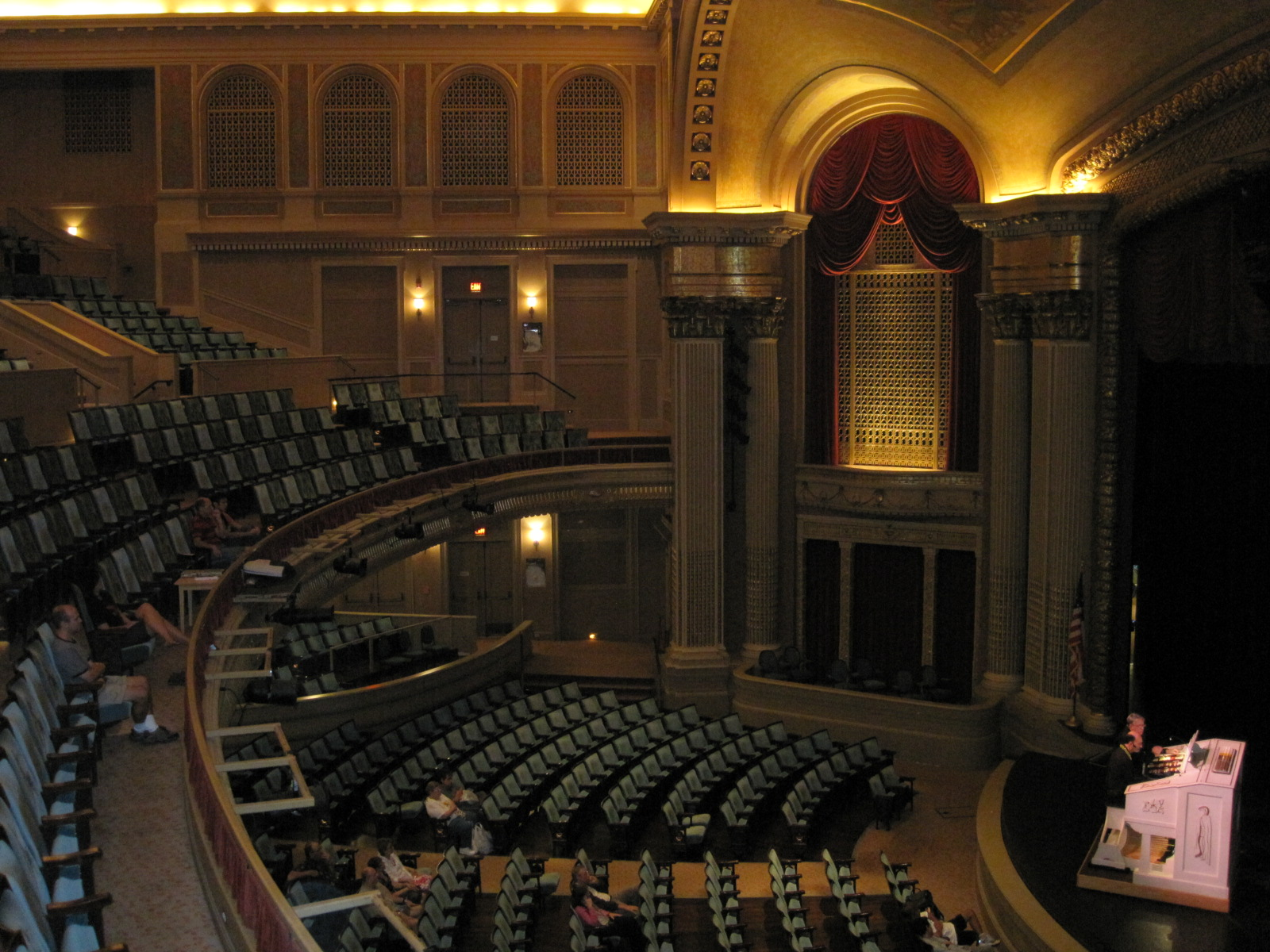
Main concert hall of the Hawaii Theatre, where the Hawaiʻi Symphony Orchestra performs

The Hawaiʻi Symphony Orchestra (HSO), formerly known as the Honolulu Symphony Orchestra, was founded in 1900. It is one of the oldest orchestras in the United States west of the Rocky Mountains. The orchestra performs at the Hawaii Theatre and the renovated Neal S. Blaisdell Concert Hall in Honolulu. Previous music directors included Fritz Hart, George Barati, Robert La Marchina, and Donald Johanos. Dane Lam is the music and artistic director, having assumed the post in 2023.

== History ==
The orchestra was originally housed in a clubhouse on the slopes of Punchbowl. From 1996 to 2004, the orchestra was under the direction of conductor Samuel Wong. In August 2007, Andreas Delfs became principal conductor of the orchestra and led seven concerts per season in the orchestra's Halekulani Masterworks series.

In 2009–2010, the Honolulu Symphony faced significant financial challenges and ceased operations following bankruptcy proceedings. In 2011, a group of Hawaiʻi community leaders acquired the orchestra's assets and relaunched the organization under the name Hawaiʻi Symphony Orchestra, resuming performances later that year. JoAnn Falletta was appointed artistic director, and Steven Monder, former executive director of the Cincinnati Symphony Orchestra, was appointed president.

In 2014, the Hawaiʻi Symphony Orchestra introduced the musicthatPOPS concert series, featuring popular and multimedia programming alongside its classical offerings.

Falletta later assumed the title of conductor emeritus. Ignace Jang is the orchestra's current concertmaster.

On June 5, 2026, Governor Josh Green signed House Bill 1860, designating the Hawaiʻi Symphony Orchestra as the state orchestra of Hawaii.

== Conductors ==
=== Music directors ===
- 1932–1949 Fritz Hart
- 1950–1967 George Barati
- 1967–1979 Robert La Marchina
- 1979–1994 Donald Johanos
- 1996–2004 Samuel Wong
- 2007–2010 Andreas Delfs (Principal Conductor)
- 2011–2023 JoAnn Falletta (Artistic Advisor)
- 2023–present Dane Lam (music and artistic director)

=== Conductor emeritus ===
- 2023–present JoAnn Falletta
