= Philippe-Joseph Aubert de Gaspé =

French Canadian writer and seigneur

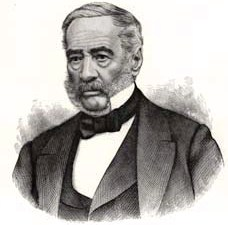
- Aubert de Gaspé, lithograph from a photograph taken in 1863–64
- Born: 30 October 1786; Quebec City, Province of Quebec, British North America
- Died: 29 January 1871 (aged 84); Quebec City, Quebec, Canada
- Occupations: Writer and seigneur

Philippe-Joseph Aubert de Gaspé (French pronunciation: [filip ʒozɛf obɛʁ də ɡaspe]; 30 October 1786 – 29 January 1871) was a Canadian lawyer, writer, and seigneur. He is known chiefly for his novel Les Anciens Canadiens (translated as The Canadians of Old, 1864), considered the first classic of French Canadian fiction.

== Biography ==
He was born in Quebec City in 1786, the son of seigneur Pierre-Ignace Aubert de Gaspé and Catherine Tarieu de Lanaudière, the daughter of seigneur Charles-François Tarieu de La Naudière. The Aubert de Gaspé family was distinguished, ennobled by Louis XIV in 1693. Philippe-Joseph's grandfather, Ignace-Philippe Aubert de Gaspé, fought under Louis-Joseph de Montcalm at Carillon (Ticonderoga). Later Joseph inherited the family estate on the St. Lawrence River.

Philippe-Joseph studied at the Séminaire de Québec and served in the local militia, becoming captain. He studied law with Jonathan Sewell and then with Jean-Baptiste-Olivier Perrault and was called to the bar in 1811. After practising law until 1816, he was appointed sheriff for the Quebec district. He became mired in debt, for which he was imprisoned four years. When released, he retired to his ancestral home at Saint-Jean-Port-Joli, Quebec on the St. Lawrence, where he spent thirty years in study.

At the age of seventy-five, he completed the novel Les Anciens Canadiens (Quebec, 1863), translated in English as The Canadians of Old (1864). Almost entirely based on fact, the story illustrates Canadian national tradition, character, and manners. The author interwove events of his own chequered life with the tragic tale of the struggles and the fall of New France and the change of regime, the eyewitnesses of which he had known personally. It was perhaps the most popular book published in Quebec up to that time.

In 1866, Aubert de Gaspé published his Mémoires, which continue and amplify the historical notes contained in his other works. Less brilliant and attractive than his novel, the Mémoires are an excellent specimen of anecdotal history. The author's standing and experience, the latter embracing directly or indirectly the space of a century dating from the Conquest, made him an authentic chronicler of an obscure yet eventful period of history.

He was the last seigneur of Saint-Jean-Port-Joli and died at Quebec City on 29 January 1871.

== Family ==
He married Susanne Allison in 1811. Together they had 13 children. Of his daughters, several of them married notable men, including Suzanne, who married William Power, a member of the legislative assembly; Adélaïde, who married Georges-René Saveuse de Beaujeu; Charlotte-Elmire, who married Andrew Stuart, a judge and seigneur; and Zoé, who married Charles Joseph Alleyn, who was also mayor of Quebec City. His son Philippe-Ignace François Aubert was also a writer.
