= Roberto Mascaró =

Uruguayan poet and translator (born 1946)

Roberto Mascaró (born 12 December 1946 in Montevideo) is a Uruguayan poet and translator.

Resident in Sweden, he is renowned for his Spanish translations of Tomas Tranströmer's work.

== Poetry ==
- Estacionario (poems), Nordan, Stockholm, 1983.
- Chatarra/Campos (poems), Siesta, Stockholm, 1984.
- Asombros de la nieve (poems), Siesta, Stockholm, 1984.
- Fält (Campos) (poems with Swedish version by Hans Bergqvist), Fripress, Stockholm, 1986.
- Mar, escobas (poems), Ediciones de Uno, Montevideo, 1987.
- Södra Korset/ Cruz del Sur (bilingual poetry), Siesta, Stockholm, 1987.
- Gueto (poems), Vintén Editor, Montevideo, 1991.
- Öppet fält / Campo abierto, Siesta, Malmö, 1998.
- Campo de fuego, Aymara, Montevideo, 2000 (Premio Internacional de Poesía Ciudad de Medellín 2002)
- Montevideo cruel, Ediciones Imaginarias, Montevideo, 2003.
- Un río de pájaros, Fondo Editorial EAFIT, Medellín, Colombia, 2004.
- Asombros de la nieve (anthology), La Liebre Libre, Venezuela, 2004.

== Translations ==
- La nueva poesía sueca (with Mario Romero), Siesta, Stockholm, 1985.
- Postales negras (poems by Tomas Tranströmer), Inferno, Buenos Aires, 1988.
- El bosque en otoño (poems by T. Tranströmer), Ediciones de Uno, Montevideo, 1989.
- Poemas sin terminar (poems by Göran Sonnevi), Vintén Editor, Montevideo, 1991.
- En los abedules está la luz (poems by Jan Erik Vold), Vintén Editor, Montevideo, 1991.
- Para vivos y muertos (selected poems by T. Tranströmer), Hiperión, Madrid, 1992.
- Caminar sobre las aguas, Anthony de Mello, Lumén, Madrid, 1993.
- Öjvind Fahlström: versiones de manifiestos y poemas concretos, Instituto Valenciano de Arte Moderno, Centro Julio González, Valencia, 1992.
- August Strindberg, IVAM, Centro Julio González, Valencia, 1993.
- Graffiti (poems by Hans Bergqvist), Zafiria libros, Montevideo, 1993.
- Viaje nocturno (poems by T. Tranströmer)
- Casa con creatura (poems by Ulf Eriksson)
- Góndola fúnebre (poems by Tomas Tranströmer), LAR, Concepción, Chile, 2000
- 29 jaicus y otros poemas/ 29 haiku och andra dikter (poems by T. Tranströmer), Encuentros imaginarios, Montevideo, 2004.
- Elvis, arena para el gato y otras cosas importantes (poems by Tomas Ekström), Encuentros imaginarios, Montevideo, 2004.
- Solo (novela), August Strindberg, Jakembo Editores, Asunción, Paraguay, 2006.
