= The Influence of a Book =

The Influence of a Book (French: L'influence d'un livre, pronounced [lɛ̃flyɑ̃s dœ̃ livʁ]) is a novel by the Canadian writer Phillipe-Ignace François Aubert du Gaspé, first published in 1837. It is considered to be the first French Canadian novel, and although the book was not well received initially, it has come to be recognized as a major landmark in Canadian literature.

It is the tale of Charles Amand's quest for gold. Between alchemy, the courtship of his daughter Amélie, the legend of Rose Latulipe and the murder of the peddler Guilmette, there is a satirical theme aimed at spiritual poverty in Quebec.

The Influence of a Book, an English language translation by Claire Rothman, was published in 1993 and won the John Glassco Translation Prize in 1994.

== Editions ==
- Le Chercheur de trésors. (1864) by H. R. Casgrain
- L'influence d'un livre. (1968) by Léopold Leblanc
- Le chercheur de trésors ou L’influence d’un livre. roman. 1837 online
  - Transl. Claire Holden Rothman: The Influence of a Book. Robert Davies Publ. 1993 ISBN 1895854105 John Glassco Translation Award
