= Dane Lam =

Australian conductor

- Born: Brisbane, Queensland, Australia
- Education: University of Queensland; Juilliard School; Royal Northern College of Music
- Occupation: Conductor
- Years active: 2003–present
- Known for: Music and Artistic Director, Hawaiʻi Symphony Orchestra; Artistic Director, State Opera South Australia; Principal Conductor, Xi'an Symphony Orchestra
- Spouse: Sofia Troncoso
- Website: danelam.net

Dane Lam is an Australian conductor. He is Music and Artistic Director of the Hawaiʻi Symphony Orchestra, Artistic Director of State Opera South Australia and Principal Conductor of the Xi'an Symphony Orchestra, and has been described as the only conductor holding simultaneous leadership positions at major institutions in the United States, Australia and Asia.

Appointed in 2023 as the first music director in the Hawaiʻi Symphony Orchestra's history, Lam had his contract extended to 2031 in 2025. At Xi'an, where he has led the orchestra since 2014, he was the first non-Chinese national to hold its chief conducting post. He was previously the first conductor to hold an official position with Opera Queensland.

In opera he has conducted for Opera Holland Park, Scottish Opera, Opera Australia and West Australian Opera. In 2025–26 he conducted The Magic Flute, the first co-production between Australian and Chinese opera companies, in Hong Kong, Adelaide and Beijing, where he made his debut with the London Philharmonic Orchestra at the Beijing Music Festival. Reviewing his Scottish Opera Carmen, Opera Now described his conducting as "the best thing about this production".

== Career ==
=== Hawaiʻi Symphony Orchestra ===
On 18 January 2023 the Hawaiʻi Symphony Orchestra announced Lam's appointment as its first music director, on a five-year contract beginning with the 2023–24 season; he had guest-conducted the orchestra in 2022. In August 2023, in his first weeks in the post, he conducted the orchestra in Maui Ola, a benefit concert for victims of the Maui wildfires that raised more than one million dollars.

In November 2025 the orchestra extended his contract through 2031 and gave him the title Music and Artistic Director. Under Lam the orchestra has broadened its programming to include collaborations with Hawaiian artists and premieres of music from across the Pacific, and he has campaigned for the orchestra to be recognised as the state orchestra of Hawaiʻi; Lam has described the ensemble as "the orchestra of the Pacific". In September 2026 the orchestra gave a free concert, Mele for Maui, in West Maui.

=== State Opera South Australia ===
In September 2023 Lam was appointed Artistic Director of State Opera South Australia in Adelaide, succeeding Stuart Maunder. On his appointment he said he intended to conduct at least one production each season, to commission works telling Australian and South Australian stories, and to develop locally made productions capable of touring internationally.

In 2025 Lam conducted a new production of Mozart's The Magic Flute, co-produced by State Opera South Australia, Opera Hong Kong, the Beijing Music Festival and the China National Opera House, described by Limelight as "the first major co-production between Australian and Chinese opera institutions". It was staged in Hong Kong and then in Adelaide in August 2025, where Graham Strahle in InDaily wrote that Lam "imparts real energy and dynamism both as conductor and guiding light" and had the Adelaide Symphony Orchestra "playing with flowing tempos, neat articulation and great spirit", before its mainland Chinese premiere at the Beijing Music Festival in October 2026. The Beijing performances, on 10 and 11 October 2026 at the Central Opera House, were given by the London Philharmonic Orchestra, the festival's orchestra-in-residence, and marked Lam's debut with the orchestra.

=== Xi'an Symphony Orchestra ===
Lam became Principal Conductor of the Xi'an Symphony Orchestra in 2014, the first non-Chinese national to hold the orchestra's chief conducting post. With the orchestra he conducted the 2016 CCTV-1 Mid-Autumn Festival Gala and, in 2017, a joint project with students of the University of Queensland Symphony Orchestra in China. At Xi'an he brought in international soloists including Sumi Jo and programmed works by living and neglected composers.

=== Opera in the United Kingdom ===
Lam made his London debut conducting Rossini's La Cenerentola at Opera Holland Park, where he later conducted Don Giovanni, Norma and a new production of Così fan tutte in 2018. He was nominated for Best Newcomer at the 2018 International Opera Awards.

Lam first worked with Scottish Opera in 2017, sharing the conducting of the company's autumn tour of La traviata with David Parry. In 2023 he conducted the company's new production of Carmen in Glasgow and Edinburgh. Susan Nickalls, writing in Opera Now, found that "the best thing about this production was conductor ... Lam's fresh and pacey approach to this well-known score". He returned in 2026 for The Marriage of Figaro; David Kettle in The Scotsman praised a "beautifully light-footed but richly detailed account of Mozart's score", and the British Theatre Guide wrote that he "conducts with his usual exuberant precision".

=== Australia ===
In December 2020 Lam was appointed Associate Music Director and Resident Conductor of Opera Queensland, the first conductor in the company's history to hold an official position, and led the company's return to performance after the COVID-19 lockdowns. He was appointed an associate lecturer at the University of Queensland in 2021 to establish a conducting programme. He has conducted the Queensland Symphony Orchestra, Adelaide Symphony Orchestra, Melbourne Symphony Orchestra, Sydney Symphony Orchestra, West Australian Symphony Orchestra and Canberra Symphony Orchestra, and has appeared with Opera Australia and West Australian Opera, for which he conducted a new production of Carmen in 2023. He was nominated for Artist of the Year by Limelight in 2021.

=== Guest conducting ===
In the 2026–27 season Lam makes his debut with the Buffalo Philharmonic Orchestra, conducting Mozart and Mahler with violinist Melissa White in January 2027, and with the Ann Arbor Symphony Orchestra in April 2027, in a programme including the Midwest premiere of Nico Muhly's Concerto for String Quartet and Orchestra with Brooklyn Rider and Dvořák's Eighth Symphony.

=== Orchestras conducted ===
Beyond his titled posts, Lam has conducted the Royal Liverpool Philharmonic Orchestra, London Philharmonic Orchestra, Munich Radio Orchestra, Residentie Orkest (The Hague), Beethoven Orchester Bonn, Orchestre National de France, RTÉ Concert Orchestra, City of London Sinfonia, Manchester Camerata, Southbank Sinfonia and the Verbier Festival Orchestra in Europe; the Sydney Symphony Orchestra, Melbourne Symphony Orchestra, Queensland Symphony Orchestra, Adelaide Symphony Orchestra, West Australian Symphony Orchestra, Canberra Symphony Orchestra and Dunedin Symphony Orchestra in Australasia; and the Beijing, Suzhou, Kunming and Shandong symphony orchestras in China.

== Recordings ==
- Xiaogang Ye: The Backyard of the Village – Orchestral Works. Royal Liverpool Philharmonic Orchestra, Diyang Mei (viola), Guy Johnston (cello), Dane Lam. Signum Classics, 2026.

== Views ==
Lam has spoken publicly about the economics and civic role of opera. On his appointment in Adelaide he rejected the charge that opera is elitist, saying that performers "shouldn't be apologetic that we have trained for years and years to be able to perform at the highest level", and argued for retaining the traditional repertoire while opening it to new voices and audiences. In October 2026 he appeared on CGTN's discussion programme The Hype to discuss the Beijing Magic Flute co-production and cultural exchange between China, Australia and the United States.

== Training ==
Lam was born in Brisbane to an Australian mother and a Singaporean-Chinese father. He played the piano as a child and later studied the clarinet, and made his first appearance with the Sydney Symphony Orchestra at the Sydney Opera House at the age of 18. He completed a Bachelor of Music with honours at the University of Queensland in 2006, studying conducting with Gwyn Roberts, and was accepted at 22 as a postgraduate student at the Juilliard School in New York, where he took a master's degree on a full scholarship under James DePreist. He subsequently held a Junior Fellowship in Conducting at the Royal Northern College of Music under Sir Mark Elder, Clark Rundell and Mark Heron, spent three years studying with Gianluigi Gelmetti, and was a protégé of Kurt Masur, for whom he served as assistant conductor at the Orchestre National de France. His student awards included the Bruno Walter Memorial Scholarship, the Boris Christoff Prize, the Brian Stacey Memorial Prize, the Pellegrino Scholarship, the Brian Boak Bursary and the Dalley-Scarlett Memorial Scholarship.

== Personal life ==
Lam is married to the soprano Sofia Troncoso. He has described Hawaiʻi as his home.
