= Madeleine Isaksson =

Swedish/French composer

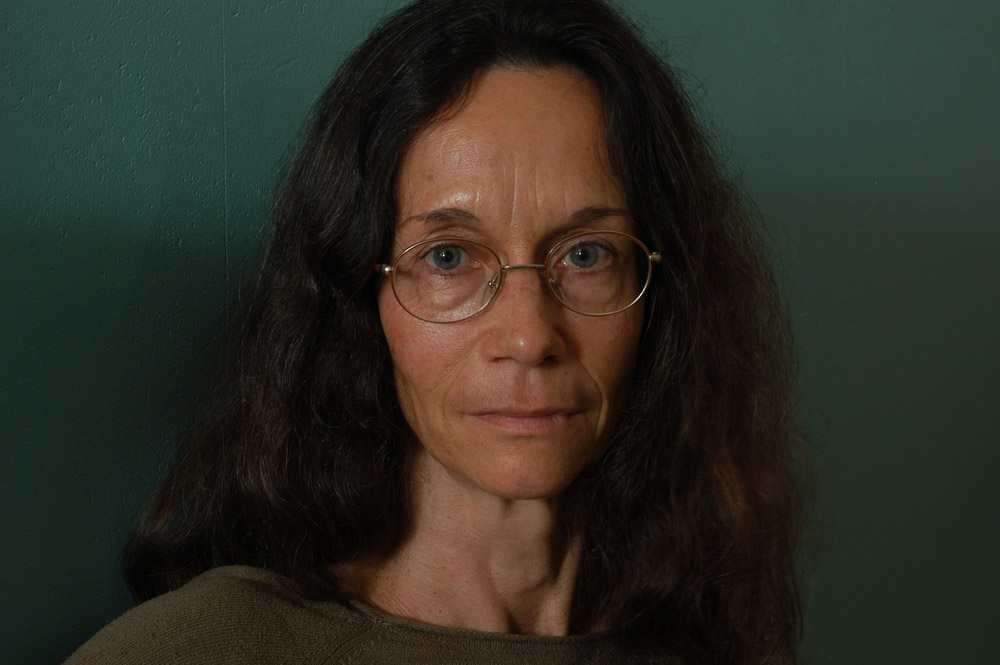
- Born: 1956 (age 69–70); Stockholm
- Occupation: Composer
- Website: madeleineisaksson.com

Madeleine Isaksson (born 1956) is a Swedish/French composer.

== Biography ==
Madeleine Isaksson studied at the Royal Academy of Music in Stockholm from 1979 to 1987. She received a diploma as a piano and ensemble teacher after studying under Gunnar Hallhagen, and then studied composition under teachers including Gunnar Bucht and Sven-David Sandström (composition), Pär Lindgren (electroacoustic music), Arne Mellnäs (instrumentation), and Bo Wallner (music theory and analysis). In 1987 she lived in Amsterdam for a year of studies with the composer Louis Andriessen. Meetings with composers at different composition courses in Europe, Brian Ferneyhough, Iannis Xenakis, Morton Feldman and Emmanuel Nunes, have all contributed to Isaksson’s development as a composer. In the early 1990s, she moved to France, where she lives and works near Paris.

== Works ==
Isaksson has composed for solo, duo, trio, quartet, ensemble, orchestra and vocal music.

=== Instrumental ===
- Chaconne for piano (1982)
- 7 formade frön ("7 Formed Seeds") for piano (1984)
- Tång ("Seaweed") for english horn, basson, bass clarinet, contrabass clarinet, harp, harpsichord, cello and double bass (1984)
- Capriola for baritone saxophone and trombone (1989)
- Stråkvåg ("String Wave") for string quartet (1990)
- Tjärnöga – Ö blå ("The Eye of the Lake – Blue Island") for horn solo (1990)
- färde for violin and open grand piano (1991)
- Som om ("As If") for alto flute, bass clarinet, viola, cello, double bass and percussion (1991)
- Tillstånd - Avstånd ("States – Distances") for 16 musicians (1992)
- inné ("innate") for flute, oboe, saxophone (clarinet), horn, bassoon, violin, viola, cello and double bass (1993)
- Fästen o fall ("Handholds and downfalls") for chamber orchestra (double wind quintet, bass clarinet and 17 strings) (1995–96)
- Andelek ("Spirit Game") for saxophone quartet (sopranino, 2 sopranos, baritone) (1997)
- Ici est ailleurs ("Here is Somewhere Else") for flute, percussion, violin, viola, cello and double bass (1998/2001)
- Rooms for alto flute, bass clarinet, cello and percussion (1999–2000)
- Ambo for alto flute and violin (2001)
- Axis for violin (with whisper/voice) and percussion (2002)
- Failles ("Gaps") for trombone, recorder and cello (2003)
- Fibres for flute, viola and 10-stringed guitar (2004)
- Îlots ("Ilets") for orchestra (strings, saxophone, accordion) (2005–07)
- Les sept vallées ("The Seven Valleys") for recorder solo (2006)
- Infra for violin duo (2007)
- Sondes ("Sounding Lines") for bass flute/alto flute, English horn/oboe, alto saxophone (or clarinet), violin, cello, piano and percussion (2009)
- Far ... for alto guitar and electronics (2011)
- Flux for brass quintet (2 trumpets, horn, trombone, tuba) (2012)
- Isär ("Apart") for flute, clarinet, violin, viola, cello, piano and percussion (2012)
- Vide supra ("See Above") for violin duo (2014)
- Vågkammar for piano left hand (2015)
- In quarto for flute quartet (2016)
- Bridges for brass and percussion (2016)
- Ljusrymd ("Space of Light") for orchestra (2017)
- Traces for string trio (2017)
- Springkällor for improvising pianist and 7 instruments (2018)
- Luftstegen for violin, piano and percussion (2018)

=== Vocal ===
- Three songs for soprano, clarinet and piano, text by Sten Hagliden (1982)
  1. "Vara sin formel trogen"
  2. "Någon faller mitt liv i talet"
  3. "Sången om ljung"
- Löp ("Run") for soprano, mezzo-soprano, accordion and 5 percussions, text by the composer (1986)
- In Between for mezzo-soprano and electric guitar (1987)
- Å svävare for soprano, mezzo, baritone, viola and cello (1993–95)
  1. "Wir sehen dich", text by Paul Celan (soprano, mezzo, viola)
  2. "Wie soll ich", text by Rainer Maria Rilke and Juan dela Cruz (soprano, baritone, cello)
  3. "Oh cauterio suave", text by Juan dela Cruz and Susanne Marten (soprano, mezzo, cello)
  4. "Cuan manso y amoroso", text by Juan dela Cruz (soprano, mezzo, baritone, viola, cello)
  5. "Doch alles was uns", text by Rainer Maria Rilke & Susanne Marten (mezzo, baritone, viola)
  6. "Taktavla", text by Katarina Frostenson (soprano)
  7. "Taktavla", text by Katarina Frostenson (soprano, viola, cello)
- Blad över blad / Feuille sur feuille for soprano, mezzo and cello with text by the composer (2000)
- Ciels ("Skies") for six solo voices (soprano, mezzo, alto, tenor, baritone, bass) with text by Gérard Haller (2009–10)
- Dans l'air (from Ciels) for 2 sopranos and mezzo-soprano with text from Météoriques by Gérard Haller (2010)
- Terre de l'absence ("Earth of Absence") for six soloist voices: soprano, mezzo-soprano, alt, tenor, baritone and bass with text by Adonis in French translation by Anne Wade Minkowski (2012)
- Hemligheten ("The Secret") for countertenor, recorder, baroque violin, viol and theorbo, text by Tomas Tranströmer (2013)
- Várije ("Towards the Mountains") for children's opera choir (with two soprano soloists) and children's yoik choir (2013)
