= Baltics (poem) =

Book by Tomas Tranströmer

- First edition
- Author: Tomas Tranströmer
- Original title: Östersjöar
- Translators: Robin Fulton (UK), Samuel Charters (USA)
- Language: Swedish
- Publisher: Albert Bonniers förlag
- Publication date: 1974
- Publication place: Sweden

Baltics (Swedish: Östersjöar) is a long poem by the Swedish writer Tomas Tranströmer, published in its own volume in 1974. Its narrative is set in the Stockholm archipelago and starts from notes left by Tranströmer's grandfather, who had been a maritime pilot.

== Publication ==
The book was published in 1974 through Albert Bonniers Förlag. An English translation by Robin Fulton was published that year in the Scottish magazine Lines Review and then as a stand-alone volume by Oasis Books in 1980; the American translation by Samuel Charters was published by Oyez in 1975. In 1990, a few months before he suffered a stroke which damaged his ability to speak, Tranströmer made a Swedish audio recording of the poem which runs for 24 minutes.

== Crossing boundaries ==
In the poet’s eyes, "the keyword in this long poem is the word or concept of boundary. It is the boundary between the present and the past, between east and west, and it is the boundary between living and dead, the boundary between silence and what can be articulated.” Its English translator Robin Fulton also noted of "the plural of the title: here we have not one Baltic but a whole series of them, reflecting the very different experience of those in whose lives that particular sea has come to play a part." There is a cyclical movement in the poem from the 1884 logbook of his maternal grandfather, Carl Helmer Westerberg (born 1860), in the first section, to a photograph of his orphaned maternal grandmother, Maria Westerberg, in the sixth and final section. In between come other scenes, memories and encounters.

== Bibliography ==
- Patty Crane’s translation of Baltics at PEN America
- Robin Fulton’s translation in the New Collected Poems 2011, pp.127-40 and his comments on the poems on pp.xvi-xviii

== See also ==
- 1974 in literature
- Swedish literature
