= The Truthbarrier =

The Truthbarrier (Swedish: Sanningsbarriären) is a 1978 poem collection by the Swedish writer Tomas Tranströmer.
