= George Barati =

- Born: György Braunstein; April 3, 1913
- Origin: Győr, Austria-Hungary
- Died: June 22, 1996 (aged 83) San Jose, California

George Barati (born György Braunstein) (April 3, 1913, Győr, Hungary - June 22, 1996, San Jose, California) was a Hungarian-American cellist, composer, and conductor.

Barati studied under Zoltán Kodály and Leo Weiner while a student at the Liszt Academy of Music in the 1930s, and became widely known as a performer throughout Hungary, both as a soloist and with the Pro Ideale Quartet. He immigrated to the United States in 1938, where he studied composition at Princeton under Roger Sessions and taught cello performance until 1943. He then relocated to California, where he was cellist with the San Francisco Symphony Orchestra (1946–50) and worked with chamber ensembles.

In 1950, Barati moved to Oahu, where he became the conductor of the Honolulu Symphony Orchestra, a position he held from 1950 to 1967. He also began doing international tours as a conductor. He returned to California in 1968 and was co-director of the Villa Montalvo Center for Art in Saratoga, California, from 1971 to 1980 he directed the Santa Cruz County Symphony Orchestra.

== Works (selection) ==
- Chant of Light for orchestra
- Chant of Darkness for orchestra
- The Dragon and the Phoenix
- 3 Inventionen for timpani
- Kammerkonzert
- Lumberjack for trombone
- Polarization for orchestra
- Quartet for harpsichord, flute, oboe and doublebass
- Sonate for violin and piano
- Symphony n°1 Alpine
- Triple Exposure for cello
