= Donald Johanos =

American conductor and music director

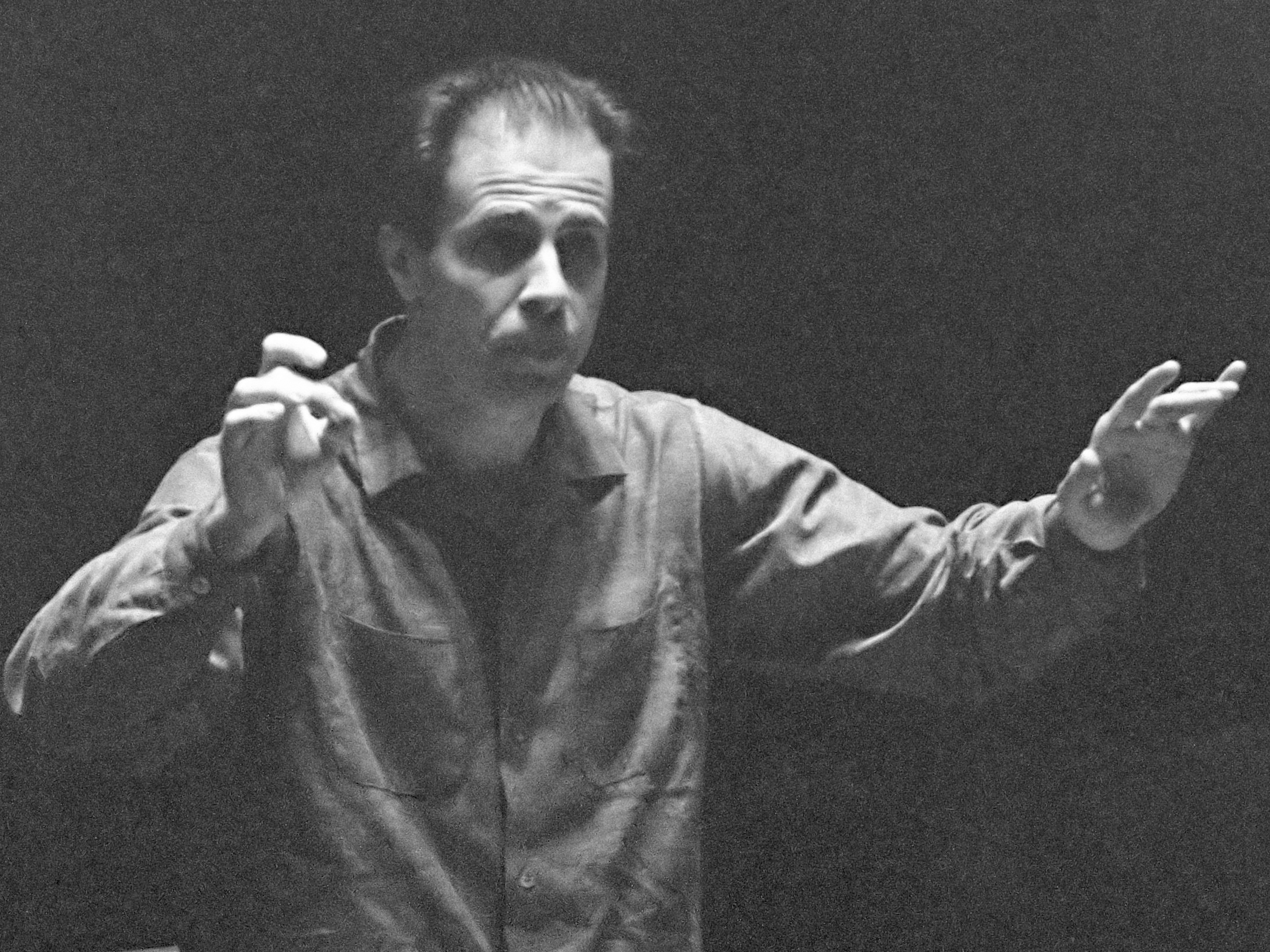
Donald Johanos (1963)

Donald George Johanos (February 10, 1928 – May 29, 2007) was a conductor and music director with the Dallas Symphony Orchestra and the Honolulu Symphony Orchestra. He was recognized for his support of contemporary classical music. He performed or conducted on at least 16 recordings.

== Early life and career ==
Johanos was born in Cedar Rapids, Iowa, in 1928. He attended the Eastman School of Music, receiving an undergraduate degree in violin, a master's degree in music theory and a performer's certificate in conducting.

After his graduation from Eastman, Johanos played violin for five years in the Rochester Philharmonic Orchestra, where he received coaching in conducting from the music director, Erich Leinsdorf. In 1958, Johanos won the International Conductors Competition run by the Netherlands Radio Union.

== Conductor and music director ==
In 1962, Johanos became the music director and principal conductor with the Dallas Symphony Orchestra. During this period, he conducted the orchestra in several recordings of music by Copland, Ives, Rachmaninoff and other composers. However, he had problems with the musicians during his stint in Dallas, resulting in his departure in 1970.

Johanos moved to the Pittsburgh Symphony Orchestra as associate conductor and director of its chamber orchestra.

He became the musical director and conductor of the Honolulu Symphony Orchestra in 1979. Johanos helped settle the orchestra down after the retirement of Robert la Marchina. He was also known for championing new music, which caused some frictions with the board. Johanos received an award from the American Society of Composers, Authors and Publishers in 1991 for "adventuresome programming of contemporary music".

While at Honolulu, Johanos recorded with his own and other orchestras. In 1993, the Honolulu Symphony Orchestra recorded an album, Three Works by Dan Welcher with the Honolulu Symphony, under Johanos's baton. Welcher dedicated his Symphony No. 1 to Johanos. The 1993–94 season, which would have been Johanos's last with the Honolulu orchestra, was cancelled due to a labor dispute.

Johanos retired to Naples, Florida, where he died in 2007.
