= Literary Translators' Association of Canada =

Canadian literary organization

- Association des traducteurs et traductrices littéraires du Canada
- Founded: 1975
- Type: Professional association
- Affiliations: International Federation of Translators (FIT)
- Website: www.attlc-ltac.org

The Literary Translators' Association of Canada (LTAC) (or, in French, Association des traducteurs et traductrices littéraires du Canada (ATTLC)) is a national professional association of literary translators in Canada. Founded to advance the interests of literary translators and promote the translation of literature, its members translate fiction, nonfiction, poetry, and drama across more than twenty languages. The association organizes professional workshops, conferences, and literary contests, and maintains a public directory of accredited translators.

LTAC is affiliated internationally with the International Federation of Translators (FIT).

== History ==
The Literary Translators' Association of Canada was founded in 1975 and now has approximately 120 members, mainly translating literary works originally written in French or English, although many work in other languages.

Among the LTAC's achievements has been obtaining codified recognition of translations as literary works in the Canadian Copyright Act, and a 50% share of public lending right payments for translators.

The association's activities focus on professional development for its members and promoting public awareness of quality in literary translation. Since 1982, LTAC has sponsored the John Glassco Translation Prize, an annual award honoring an emerging translator for their first book-length literary translation published into French or English across fiction, non-fiction, poetry, drama, or children's literature. The award carries a CA$1,500 purse alongside a complimentary one-year LTAC membership, and is presented annually in late September in conjunction with International Translation Day (the feast of Saint Jerome). Named in honor of Canadian writer and translator John Glassco (1909–1981), more than forty translators have received the prize since its establishment.

== Governance ==
The association is administered by an elected board of directors composed of executive officers and regional administrators across Canada.

=== Leadership and past presidents ===
Since its foundation in 1975, the presidency of the association has been held by notable Canadian literary figures, translators, and scholars, including:

- Patricia Claxton (1975–1979; founding president)
- Michel Beaulieu (1979)
- Ray Ellenwood (1979–1983)
- David Homel (1983–1986)
- Sherry Simon and Michel Buttiens (1988–1990)
- Jane Brierley (1990–1994)
- Beatriz Hausner (1994–1997, 2001–2003, 2017–2020)
- Charlotte Melançon (1997–1999)
- Howard Scott (1999–2001)
- Margarita Feliciano (2003–2004)
- Phyllis Aronoff (2004–2009)
- Jo-Anne Elder (2009–2013)
- Nicola Danby (2013–2014)
- Madeleine Stratford (2014–2017)
- Bilal Hashmi (2020–2023)
- Nicolas Calvé and Arianne Des Rochers (2023–2026)
- Jeannot Clair (2026–present)

=== Board of directors ===
The current board includes representation from English- and French-language sections, as well as delegates for regional jurisdictions across Canada:

- President: Jeannot Clair
- Vice-presidents: Madeleine Stratford (French section), Peter McCambridge (English section)
- Treasurer: Arielle Aaronson
- Secretary: Catherine Leroux
- Regional administrators:
  - Quebec: Aleshia Jensen, Jessica Moore
  - Ontario: Sarah Henzi, David Warriner
  - Atlantic: Christelle Morelli
  - Western Region: Lidice Megla

== See also ==
- International Federation of Translators
