= Ignace Jang =

Ignace Jang (born 1969) is a South Korean and French violinist and is a grand and jury prize recipient. He is concertmaster of the Hawaii Symphony and teaches at the University of Hawaiʻi at Mānoa.

== Background ==
Jang was born to South Korean parents in Grenoble where by the age of five he began his first violin lessons with Flora Elphege and then continued it with Gerard Poulet at the Conservatoire de Paris. He was fascinated with Detroit and Argentinian music especially Astor Piazzolla and his tangos. Currently he is a concertmaster of both the Britt Festival and the Hawaii Symphony Orchestra as well as a teacher at the University of Hawaiʻi at Mānoa. In 1989 he became a prize winner at both the Rodolfo Lipizer and Lions Club's violin competitions and Eastern Music Festival. He also was a participant of various festivals such in such places as Berlioz, Chirens and Colorado Music Festival. He played in various orchestras including Théâtre des Champs-Élysées and at the Sejong Center where he performed before the First Lady of South Korea. He also was a guest soloist with the Hawaii Symphony under the Samuel Wong's baton and Colorado Symphony which was under Marin Alsop. Besides South Korea and France, he traveled everywhere in Asia and Europe and even participated at the 1992 Winter Olympics Music Festival. Since 1991 he became a member of the Equinox duo.
