= Lars Edlund =

Swedish composer, organist and teacher

Lars Edlund (6 November 1922 – 21 December 2013) was a Swedish composer, organist and music teacher.

Edlund was born in Karlstad, Värmland County. He studied music at the Schola Cantorum Basiliensis in Basel, Switzerland, with Ina Lohr. He was inspired by Gregorian music, and converted to Catholicism later in life.

Edlund started working as a church musician in the early 1940s, and was also a teacher at the Swedish Royal College of Music in Stockholm. From 1971 onwards he worked solely as a composer. The majority of his compositions were vocal music, many of them with texts on religious or existentialist themes, and he composed the atonal sight-singing workbook Modus Novus. Several of his compositions can be found in the 1986 hymnal for the Church of Sweden. He also set poems by Gunnar Ekelöf and Tomas Tranströmer to music.

He was elected a member of the Royal Swedish Academy of Music in 1975.

Lars Edlund lived in Uppsala from the 1980s until his death.
