= Milan Richter =

Slovak writer, translator, publisher and diplomat

- Born: 25 July 1948; Bratislava, Czechoslovakia
- Education: Comenius University
- Occupations: Writer; playwright; translator; publisher; diplomat
- Writing career
- Language: Slovak
- Years active: 1981–present

Milan Richter (born 25 July 1948) is a Slovak writer, playwright, translator, publisher and a former high-ranking diplomat.

== Life ==
=== Early years ===
Richter was born in Bratislava into a Slovak-Moravian Jewish family that was almost exterminated in the Holocaust. He spent his childhood in the village Unín where his father's family had lived for several centuries. From 1963 to 1967 he attended the business school of foreign trade in Bratislava. From 1967, he studied German and English linguistics and literature at the Comenius University in Bratislava, as well as Scandinavian studies. In 1985 he received his doctorate in German literature.

=== Literary career ===
He worked as a language editor and editor in two publishing houses, and from 1981 as a freelance writer. For eleven years he devoted himself exclusively to the translation of literary texts, especially novels from German, English and Swedish. In 1984 he was in Weimar as a Goethe fellow to study secondary literature for his translation of Goethe's Faust. In the spring of 1990 he spent several months on the Fulbright Program at the UCLA in Los Angeles. From autumn 1992, he spent nearly two months in the Czechoslovak foreign service, and from January 1993 two and half years in the Slovak diplomatic service. He served as Chargé d'Affaires, a.i. in Norway, accredited also for Iceland. During his tenure, in 1994 the first Nordic head of state - Iceland's president Vigdís Finnbogadóttir - visited Slovakia.

From 1995 to 2002, Richter worked in the newly established Slovak Literature Center, where he founded the Department SLOLIA (Slovak Literature Abroad) and the magazine Slovak Literary Review (SLR). In 2000 he founded his own publishing house MilaniuM, specializing in Slovakian poetry, as well as in poetry and prose from Scandinavia and other countries, publishing authors such as H. C. Andersen, Emily Dickinson, R. M. Rilke, Franz Kafka, Edith Södergran, Harry Martinson, Elias Canetti, Milan Rufus, Tomas Tranströmer, Reiner Kunze, Volker Braun, and many more.

At the invitation of the Austrian Society for Literature, in 2004 and 2005 he collected in Vienna material for an anthology of Austrian poetry. In 2006 and 2007, he held a Rilke scholarship in Raron, Switzerland. In 2011 he spent three months in Weimar as a fellow of the Goethe-Gesellschaft.

=== Distinguished leadership roles ===
Richter served as chairman of the Slovak Literary Translators Society from 1999 to 2003 and as vice-chairman of the Slovak PEN Centre from 2000 to 2002. He was 1st vice-president of the World Academy of Arts and Culture (WAAC) from 2001 to 2010. On behalf of WAAC he arranged the XVIII World Congress of Poets in Bratislava in August 1998. He founded the Jan Smrek Literary Festival which he was director of from 2000 to 2011. He established the Festival Kafka's Matliary in the High Tatra region and organized lectures and readings with Kafka topic from 2007 to 2009. He was chairman of the Club of Independent Writers in Slovakia 2013–2016 and President of the Slovak PEN Centre 2017–2020. He is also a member of the Austrian writers organization Grazer Autorenversammlung, of the Goethe-Gesellschaft in Germany, of the Academy on the Borders (Austria), of the European Academy of Poetry in UK and of the Bjornstjerne Bjornson Academy (Norwegian Academy of Literature and Freedom of Expression) in Norway.

== Work ==
Richter has published 12 books of poetry:

- Evening Mirrors (Večerné zrkadlá), 1973
- Whips (Korbáče), 1975
- Pollen (Peľ), 1976
- The Secure Place (Bezpečné miesto), 1987
- Roots in the Air (Korene vo vzduchu), 1992 – volume of anti-Communist verses
- From Behind the Velvet Curtains (Spoza zamatových opôn), 1997
- Angel with Black Feathers (Anjel s čiernym perím), 2000
- The Wrecked Temple in Me (Vo mne zbúraný chrám / Der niedergerissene Tempel in mir), 2002 – poems in 3 languages on Jewish fate and Holocaust
- Secrets Wide Open (Tajomstvá dokorán), 2008 – selected poems with a group of new verses.
- Century, the One-Hundred-Eye Creature (Storočie, kruté stoočie), 2019
- In the Courtyard of Death (Na nádvorí smrti), 2023 – poems on the Holocaust, Jewish fate
- Barbarian Time (Barbarský čas), 2023

His poems have been translated and published in 11 books abroad: in German (Die Wurzeln in der Luft; Horn, Austria, 1992), in Norwegian (Røter i lufta; Oslo, Norway, 1996) in Bulgarian (Vremeto, koeto razdava udari, Sofia, Bulgaria, 1999), in Czech (Five Seasons, Prague, 2002), in Arabic (Masacre in Beirut, Horn, Syria, 2002 – anti-Communist verses), in French (Par-dessus l'épaule du poéme, Esch-sur-Alzette, Luxembourg, 2005), in Hebrew (An Angel with Black Wings, Jerusalem, Israel, 2005), in Spanish (El silencio de los árboles en Hyde Park, Barcelona, Spain, 2007), in Chinese (Living Stones from the Bottom of a Lake, Taipei, Taiwan, 2010), in Macedonian (An Angel With Black Feathers, Struga, Macedonia, 2010) and in Serbian (Seen in the Snow, 2018). One volume with Richter's poems in 6 languages appeared in Slovakia: Five Seasons of Life, 1998 and one volume of his poems in 7 languages was published 2013 under the title Sealed with Ashes. Richter's poems have been also published in a number of further languages (altogether in 36 languages) in more than 80 magazines and anthologies abroad, including Swedish, Hungarian, Polish, Hindu, Japanese, Icelandic, Russian, Armenian, Bangla etc.

He wrote four theatre plays:

- From Kafka's Hell-Paradise, 2006,
- Kafka's Second Life, 2007,
- The Short Unhappy Life of Marilyn Monroe, 2013,
- Good Deeds Save the World, 2018 – on the Norwegian Nobel Prize laureate, writer Bjornstjerne Bjornson, his life and his defense of the Slovaks on the dawn of the 20th century.

His theatre plays on F. Kafka have been translated into 8 languages and published in Spain, Serbia (also as a book: Kafka & Kafka, translated by Zdenka Valent-Belić, 2013), Bulgaria and in Turkey (Kafka ve Kafka, translated by Mesut Senol, published in Ankara by Bencekitap Publishers, June 2014). Richter's play The Short Unhappy Life of Marilyn Monroe which is a thriller on a fictive investigation into MM's tragic death, was published as a book in Turkish translation in August 2015 (translated by Mesut Senol), in Romanian translation in November 2016 (translated by Maria Petrescu) and in Serbian translation in October 2018 (translated by Zdenka Valent-Belić).

Milan Richter suffered an unofficial publication ban, mostly for his poetry, from 1977 to 1986 and was not allowed to be a member of the Slovak Writers' Union until 1987.

Richter is one of the leading translators in Slovakia. He translated more than 75 books and theatre plays from German, English, Swedish, Norwegian, Danish, Czech and in linguistic cooperation from Spanish and Chinese. His major translations are: Goethe's Urfaust and major parts of Faust I/II, Rilke's Duino Elegies, Kafka's aphorisms and short prose, T. Transtromer's collected poems, as well as selected poems of E. Dickinson, P. Neruda, E. Cardenal, E. Hemingway, A. Lundkvist, H. Martinson, O. Sjostrand, K. Espmark, K. Odegard, P. Tafdrup, R. M. Rilke, E. Jandl, the Prophet of K. Gibran, E. Ström, novels of J. Cheever, R. Hochhuth, L. Gustafsson, plays of L. de Vega, P. O. Enquist (6 plays altogether), E. Jelinek and E. Canetti, fairy-tales of H. C. Andersen and O. Wilde. Richter co-translated (with the Czech poet Vít Janota) selected poems of Tomas Tranströmer into Czech (2015).

== Awards (a selection) ==
- 1999: Swedish Academy's Translation Prize
- 2001: Jan Holly Prize for Poetry Translation (Goethe: Urfaust)
- 2002: Zora Jesenska Prize for Poetry Translation (Tomas Transtromer's collected poems)
- 2002: Decoration of Honour in Gold for Services to the Republic of Austria
- 2008: Royal Norwegian Order of Merit – knight of 1st class
- 2009: Jan Holly Prize for Poetry Translation (Khalil Gibran: The Prophet)
- 2010: Bjornson Prize of the Bjornstjerne Bjornson Academy, the Norwegian Academy of Literature and Freedom of Expression
- 2016: Kathak Literary Award 2016 (from Kathak Literary Circle, Dhaka, Bangladesh) "for outstanding contribution to the world literature"
- 2017: Prize of the Association of the Writers Organisations in Slovakia (AOSS) for the book Kafka and Kafka (2016)
- 2019: Crane Summit Poetry Prize (Taiwan), presented by the former president of Taiwan at a ceremony in Taipei
- 2020: Slovak PEN Centre's Prize for the poetry volume Storočie, kruté stoočie (Century, the Cruel One-Hundred-Eye Creature), 2019
- 2021: Golden Pen of the Ikar-Press 2019, awarded in May 2021
- 2023: Blahoslav Hecko Prize for the life-long translation work (2023)
- 2023: Identification Code of Slovakia (2023)
- 2025: Golden Key of Smederevo (November 2025)
