= The Half-Finished Heaven =

The Half-Finished Heaven (Swedish: Hemligheter på vägen) is a 1962 poetry collection by the Swedish writer Tomas Tranströmer. In 2001, a collection of Tranströmer's poetry was translated into English by the poet Robert Bly. This collection, called The Half-Finished Heaven: The Best Poems of Tomas Tranströmer, includes pieces from the original 1962 book as well as the eponymous poem.
