= Aude (writer) =

Canadian writer (1947–2012)

- Born: Claudette Charbonneau-Tissot; June 22, 1947; Montreal, Quebec, Canada
- Died: October 25, 2012 (aged 65); Quebec City, Quebec, Canada
- Occupations: novelist, short stories
- Writing career
- Period: 1970s-2010s
- Notable work: Cet imperceptible mouvement

Aude was the pen name of Claudette Charbonneau-Tissot (June 22, 1947 – October 25, 2012), a Canadian writer from Quebec. She is most noted for her 1997 short story collection Cet imperceptible mouvement, which won the Governor General's Award for French-language fiction at the 1997 Governor General's Awards, and her 1998 novel L'Enfant migrateur.

== Biography ==
Born in Montreal, Charbonneau-Tissot studied French literature at the Université de Montréal and creative writing at Université Laval. A teacher at Cégep Garneau in the 1970s, she wrote frequently for the literary journal La Barre du jour and the lifestyle magazine Châtelaine.

Over the course of her career, she published novels, short stories and a work of children's literature. In addition to her Governor General's Award win for Cet imperceptible mouvement, Jill Cairns won the John Glassco Translation Prize in 1999 for its English translation, The Indiscernible Movement.

She was diagnosed with leukemia in 2005, and her writing slowed down considerably after the publication of her 2006 novel Chrysalide. Her final volume of short stories, Éclats de lieux, was published in 2012 just a few weeks before her death. She died on October 25, 2012, in Quebec City.

== Works ==
- Contes pour hydrocéphales adultes (1974, short stories)
- La Contrainte (1976, short stories)
- Les Petites Boîtes (1983, children's literature)
- L'Assembleur (1985, novel)
- Banc de brume, ou Les Aventures de la petite fille que l'on croyait partie avec l'eau du bain (1987, short stories)
- La Chaise au fond de l'œil (1997, novel)
- Cet imperceptible mouvement (1997, short stories)
- L'Enfant migrateur (1998, novel)
- L'Homme au complet (1999, novel)
- Quelqu'un (2002, novel)
- Chrysalide (2006, novel)
- Éclats de lieux (2012, short stories)
