= Seeing in the Dark =

Seeing in the Dark (Swedish: Mörkerseende) is a 1970 collection of poems by the Swedish writer Tomas Tranströmer. The title may also be translated more literally as "Night Vision" or "Dark Vision" and is representative of Tranströmer's tendency to use compound words and neologisims within his work, especially when those words contribute to his immersive, sensory themes.
