= Lidice Megla =

Cuban-Canadian writer and translator

- Lidice Megla
- Born: December 6, 1968 (age 57); Cuba
- Occupations: Writer, literary translator
- Years active: 1999–present
- Website: lidicemegla.ca

Lidice Megla (born December 6, 1968) is a Cuban-Canadian poet, writer, and literary translator based in Nanaimo, Vancouver Island, British Columbia. Her literary work encompasses poetry, narrative, essays, and translations between English and Spanish.

== Career ==
Megla has authored more than 15 published volumes spanning poetry, essay collections, and fiction. Her poetry and essays have appeared in Canadian and international literary journals and anthologies, including LaMásMédula and Insularis Magazine. She has participated in cultural events such as the Feria Iberoamericana del Libro en Canadá (FILibro Canadá). Her works have also been selected for the "Local Reads" initiative by the Vancouver Island Regional Library (VIRL), which promotes regional authors across its branch network.

As a literary translator, Megla works primarily across Spanish and English, having translated more than a dozen titles encompassing poetry, fiction, non-fiction, children's literature, and art publications.

Critical commentary and reviews of her literary output have been published by writers and critics including José Hugo Fernández, Abel Germán Díaz Castro, and Yaysis Ojeda Becerra.

== Professional affiliations ==
Megla serves on the board of directors of the Literary Translators' Association of Canada (LTAC / ATTLC) as Administrator at Large for the Western Region. She is also a member of the League of Canadian Poets, the Federation of BC Writers, and The Writers' Union of Canada.

== Awards and recognition ==
- First Prize, 10th International Poetry Contest "El Mundo lleva Alas" (2018).
- Finalist, Dulce María Loynaz Poetry Contest (2021).
- Winner, Poetry and Short Story Contest for the National Gallery of Canada's exhibition Diego Rivera Meets Henry Moore, with the poem "Geographies of Beauty".
- Nominee, Women of Influence Nanaimo Award in the Arts and Culture category (2024).
- Recognized at the FILibro Canadá Literary Contest (2026).

== Selected works ==
=== Poetry ===
- Tú la Bestia (Vitrales Fl., 2018) ISBN 9781726668781
- Totémica Insular (Letras al Viento Press, 2019) ISBN 9781686648557
- Mujer sin Paredes (Editorial Voces de Hoy, 2020) ISBN 9798614965020
- La oración que trae el viento (Editorial Dos Islas, 2020) ISBN 9798676271268
- Espejo de Isla (Editorial Dos Islas, 2021) ISBN 9798416349172
- El Nombre Secreto de la Flor / The Secret Name of the Flower (Bilingual edition, Asociación Abra Cultural Canarias, 2022) ISBN 9798823877763
- Lugares Amables (Editorial Dos Islas, 2023) ISBN 9798390311288
- Fugacidad es todo lo que tengo (Cristálida Ediciones, 2024) ISBN 9782925446422
- Agua Blanca (Editorial Lunetra, 2024) ISBN 9798876175519
- El Hondo Corazón del Yeti / Into the Deep Heart of the Yeti (Ilíada Ediciones, 2025) ISBN 9798315005131

=== Fiction and essays ===
- Volando hacia uno mismo (Ilíada Ediciones, 2025) ISBN 9798302048394
- Mandala de la Perla (with Carlos R. Garcia, Editorial Lunetra, 2025) ISBN 9798306478876
- The Blue Eye of the Whale / El Ojo Azul de la Ballena (with Carlos R. Garcia, Editorial Lunetra, 2025) ISBN 9798346678960
- En el Sol Tambaleante (Ilíada Ediciones, 2025) ISBN 9798263940904
- Las Pagodas de Sal (Editorial Lunetra, 2026) ISBN 9798258464521
- Desde el otro lado del eco (Editorial Lunetra, 2026) ISBN 9798243267502

=== Literary translations ===
- Under A Weeping Willow / Bajo la sombra de un sauce by Margarita Escobar. ISBN 9781738977734
- The Talking Stones / Los guijarros parlantes by Camila Reimers (Cristálida Ediciones). ISBN 9782925446880
- Doors Boleros and Ashes / Puertas Boleros y Cenizas by Yuray Tolentino Hevia.
- To Eternity on Time / A la eternidad en punto by Abel German Díaz Castro. ISBN 9798329780727
- Los Pinos Nuevos by Dr. Liliana Vizcaino (Editorial Lunetra).
- Intimate Portrait by Maite Glaria (AMEGA Publishing). ISBN 9798880021420
- Apasanka by Camila Reimers (Cristálida Ediciones). ISBN 9782925321897
- My Daughter is an Astronaut by Claudia Valdés (Editorial Lunetra). ISBN 9798876278463
- The Skin of the Scream / La piel del grito by Yaysis Ojeda Becerra (Editorial Hypermedia, 2022). ISBN 9781948517959
- Paralelas Convergentes / Converging Parallels by Juan Calero & Héctor Rodríguez Riverol (Asociación Abra Cultural Canarias). ISBN 9798530688515
- Where Will Death Hold Its Gaze by Odalys Interian (Editorial Dos Islas). ISBN 9798776225130
- Living Dead in Silkeborg / Muerto Vivo in Silkeborg by José Hugo Fernandez. ISBN 9798756269475
