= For the Living and the Dead =

1989 poetry book by Tomas Tranströmer

- First edition
- Author: Tomas Tranströmer
- Original title: För levande och döda
- Translator: Don Coles
- Language: Swedish
- Publisher: Albert Bonniers förlag
- Publication date: 1989
- Publication place: Sweden
- English publication date: 1996
- Pages: 35
- ISBN: 91-0-047672-2

For the Living and the Dead (Swedish: För levande och döda) is a 1989 collection of poetry by the Swedish writer Tomas Tranströmer. It received the Nordic Council Literature Prize.

Its 1996 translation into English by Canadian author Don Coles won the John Glassco Translation Prize in 1997.

== See also ==
- 1989 in literature
- Swedish literature
