= Claire Holden Rothman =

Canadian writer and translator

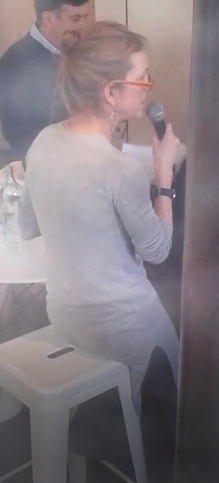
- Born: Montreal, Quebec, Canada
- Occupations: Novelist, short stories, translator
- Spouse: Arthur Holden
- Writing career
- Years active: 2000s–present
- Notable works: The Heart Specialist, My October

Claire Holden Rothman is a Canadian novelist, short story writer, and translator.

== Personal life ==
Holden Rothman resides in Montreal, Quebec, with actor and writer Arthur Holden.

== Works ==
- Salad Days (1990, short stories)
- Black Tulips (1999, short stories)
- The Heart Specialist (2009, novel)
- My October (2014, novel)
- Lear's Shadow (2018, novel)

== Awards ==
Year	Award	Book	Result	Ref.
1994	John Glassco Translation Prize	The Influence of a Book	Winner	
2009	Scotiabank Giller Prize	The Heart Specialist	Longlist	
2014	Scotiabank Giller Prize	My October	Longlist	
2014	Governor General's Award for English-language fiction	My October	Shortlist	
2017	QWF Cole Foundation Translation Prize	Sun of a Distant Land / Soleil	Shortlist	
2018	Vine Award for Canadian Jewish Literature	Lear's Shadow	Winner	
