= Pierre Ignace Liévin van Alstein =

French slave trader

Pierre-Ignace-Liévin van Alstein (1733 – 27 December 1793) was a French slave trader.

== Life ==
Leaving his homeland in 1745 due to the French siege of Ghent during the war of the Austrian Succession, he was sent to Nantes and the home of his uncle Georges-Eustache de Kradistown and Kradistown's wife Hélène Claire née Gough. Aged fifteen Pierre-Ignace-Liévin became an unpaid apprentice aboard a slave ship. He sailed on eleven voyages until 1784, four of which he organized and commanded - on his death he was said to have a considerable fortune, 200,000 to 300,000 livres according to some sources.

He became a naturalized French subject in 1787 at the end of Louis XVI's reign, but his goods were sequestered by the Revolutionary Committee and he was imprisoned. After two months in prison he died without issue on 27 December 1793 and his body was thrown in a common grave.

== Bibliography ==
- (in French) Dieudonné Rinchon, Pierre-Ignace-Liévin Van Alstein capitaine négrier. Gand 1733 - Nantes 1793, Institut français d'Afrique noire Limoges, 1964
