= Don Coles =

Canadian poet and novelist

Donald L. Coles (April 12, 1927 – November 29, 2017) was a Canadian poet and novelist. He won the 1993 Governor General's Award for English poetry for his collection Forests of the Medieval World and the Trillium Book Award in 2000 for his collection Kurgan.

He was born on April 12, 1927, in Woodstock, Ontario. He attended the University of Toronto and received a B.A in modern History in 1949, and an M.A in English Literature in 1952. He then attended the University of Cambridge, where he eventually earned a second M.A in Canadian Literature. Coles' writing began to take off after he received a British Council grant, which allowed him a year in Italy. Coles spent the following ten to twelve years traveling around Europe and lived in London, Stockholm, Florence, Munich, Copenhagen, Hamburg, and Zurich. Coles had struggled with writing and while in Europe he wrote two unpublished novels. "I was bad at characterization, I was bad at dialogue, I was bad at plot…" he told the National Post.

After he returned home in 1965 he joined the faculty of York University, where he worked for 30 years. He taught humanities, and was the director of the creative writing program. Furthermore, he was the senior editor at the Banff Centre for the Arts from 1984 to 1994. Coles was influenced by many British writers during the time he was living in Europe. These early influences were Thomas Hardy, Philip Larkin, Donald Hall, John Berryman and Margaret Atwood, with whom he worked at York University.

Coles first began writing poetry around 1966, and soon published his first collection, Sometimes All Over, in 1975 with Macmillan. Coles' first novel, Doctor Bloom's Story was not published until 2004. His other poetry collections, seven of which were published in Canada and one published in England, included Anniversaries (1979); The Prinzhorn Collection (1982); Landslides: selected poems, 1975-1985 (1986); K. in Love (1987); Little Bird (1991); Forests of the Medieval World (1993); Someone Has Stayed in Stockholm (1994, published in England); and For the Living and the Dead (1996, a translation from the Swedish). Coles died on November 29, 2017, at the age of ninety.

== Works ==
=== Publications ===
- Sometimes All Over, Macmillan of Canada, 1975 : Poetry-collection
- Anniversaries, Macmillan of Canada, 1979: Poetry-collection
- The Prinzhorn Collection, Macmillan of Canada, 1982: Poetry-collection
- Landslides, McClelland & Stewart,1986: Poetry-new and selected
- K. in Love, Signal Editions, 1987: Poetry-linked
- Little Bird, Signal Editions, 1991: Poetry
- Forests Of the Medieval World, The Porcupine's Quill, Inc., 1993: Poetry-collection
- Someone Has Stayed In Stockholm, Arc Publications, UK, 1994: Poetry- new and selected
- For the Living and the Dead, Buschekbooks, Ottawa, 1996
- Kurgan, Porcupine's Quill, Erin, Ontario, Canada, 2000
- Doctor Bloom's story, Toronto: A.A. Knopf Canada, 2004. 1st ed. : Novel
- How We All Swiftly, Signal Editions, 2005 : The first six books
- A dropped glove in Regent Street, Signal Editions, 2007
- The essential Don Coles, Porcupine's Quill, 2009
- Where We Might Have Been, Signal Editions, 2010
- "A Serious Call," Porcupine's Quill, 2015
