= Paul Ignace Mella =

UN official

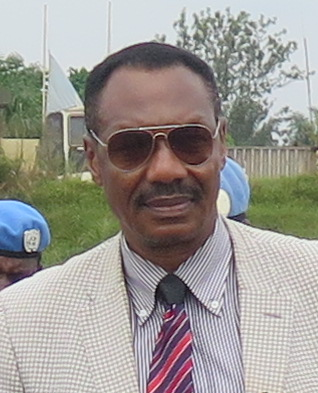
General Paul Ignace Mella, ambassador of Tanzania to the Democratic Republic of the Congo, 2017.

Lieutenant General Paul Ignace Mella, a native of the United Republic of Tanzania, is the Force Commander of the African Union-United Nations Hybrid Operation in Darfur (UNAMID). He was appointed to this position by United Nations Secretary-General Ban Ki-moon and African Union Chairperson Nkosazana Dlamini-Zuma on 4 June 2013.

== Biography ==
Lieutenant General Mella is a veteran of the Tanzanian military. Prior to this appointment, he held various high ranking positions, including the Chief of Defence Intelligence Organization in Dar es Salaam, Director of Foreign Intelligence, and Defence Adviser at the Tanzania high Commission in the Republic of Uganda. He also served as Commanding Officer of an Infantry Battalion in the United Nations Mission in Liberia.

Lieutenant General Mella obtained his master's degree in security and strategic studies from the South African National Defence College.

He is married and has three children.
