= Freja Hellenberg =

Swedish footballer (born 1989)

Personal information
- Date of birth: 3 September 1989 (age 37)
- Place of birth: Sweden
- Position: Defender

Senior career*
Years	Team	Apps	(Gls)
2009–2012	Djurgården	76	(0)
2013–2015	Avaldsnes IL	62	(0)
2016	Kopparbergs/Göteborg FC	5	(0)
2017	Djurgården		
- * Club domestic league appearances and goals as of 21 May 2016

Freja Hellenberg (born 3 September 1989) is a Swedish football defender who played for Kopparbergs/Göteborg FC, her last known football club participation is in Djurgårdens IF FF in 2017.
