= 17 Poems =

1954 poetry collection by Tomas Tranströmer

- First edition
- Author: Tomas Tranströmer
- Original title: 17 dikter
- Language: Swedish
- Publisher: Albert Bonniers förlag
- Publication date: 1954
- Publication place: Sweden
- Pages: 54

17 Poems (Swedish: 17 dikter) is a 1954 poetry collection by the Swedish writer Tomas Tranströmer. It was Tranströmer's debut book: he had previously only been published in journals. The book was well received in the Swedish press and praised for its formal confidence and imagination in metaphors.

Several of the poems in 17 poems have been set to music.

== See also ==
- 1954 in poetry
- Swedish literature
