= Ignace Despontreaux Marion =

Haitian officer (1772–1831)

Personal details
- Born: 2 December 1772 Léogâne, Saint-Domingue
- Died: 20 November 1831 (aged 58) Les Cayes, Haiti
- Spouse: Aveline Jeannot
- Children: Marion Ainé Marie-Joséphine Jacqueline Marion, Marie Jeanne Lefèvre Marion
- Occupation: Officer
- Profession: General

Ignace Despontreaux Marion (December 2, 1772 – November 20, 1831) was a Haitian officer in the Haitian Revolution (1791–1794) for independence from France. On 1 January 1804, he was one of the signatories to the Act of Independence of Haiti.

== Military career ==
Ignace Despontreaux Marion was born on 2 December 1772 on the Sarrebrousse habitation, in Léogâne. At age 21, in 1793, he served as captain of the 2nd Infantry Battalion of the Western Equality Legion as soon as he was trained on 12 May. He participated in the war against the Royalists and the English and the Civil War (War of Knives) against Toussaint Louverture under André Rigaud.

In 1802, he served in the French ranks when the Haitian War of Independence broke out. Then The following year, he took part in the campaign of the war of independence in the South against the French. On 1 January 1804, he was one of the signatories of the Independence Act of Haiti.

In 1808, Marion was appointed commander of the arrondissement of Léogâne after the death of General Yayou. In December of the same year, he became commander of the Jacmel district until 1811.

On 28 July 1809, President Alexandre Pétion promoted him as a Brigade General. In 1813, he replaced General Wagnac, who died on September 22, at the head of the district of Les Cayes. He welcomed Simon Bolivar in Les Cayes on 28 December 1815. His intervention saved Bolivar, whose authority was contested.

On 14 October 1821, he was promoted to divisional rank by President Jean-Pierre Boyer. He lent his assistance to Generals Borgella, Lys, and Bazelais for the pacification of Grand’Anse.

== Venezuela and Haiti ==
28 December 1815: Bolivar arrived at Les Cayes ten days before the arrival of the fleet from Cartagena. He was received with great pomp by the commander of the arrondissement, General Marion, seconded by Colonel Poisson Paris, commander of the place.

26 January 1816: a letter from President Pétion to General Marion: "Reasons which I should not confide to the paper, my dear General, but which tend greatly to consolidate the Republic, require me to invite you hereby to the disposition of General Bolivar two thousand muskets and their bayonets, of those deposited in the arsenal of Les Cayes by M. Brion; you will also place at your disposal the most cartridges and rifle stones that you can, with mostly cartridges, only a small quantity.

You will cause these objects to be taken out as a consignment made at Grand’Anse, by loading them on board a vessel, the captain whom you will place on board and the crew will be worthy of your confidence, and this building once outside, and a way not to be seen, will prolong that which General Simon Bolivar destined to receive these objects, and will transmit them on board. It is proper that this should not be transpired, and I am guided by the precautions you will take in this respect.”

January 26, 1816: Letter from President Pétion to General Marion: "I recommend to you, my dear General, to have a daily ration of bread and cured meats delivered by the Cayes administration to the unfortunate refugees of Cartagena and dependencies. It is an act of humanity worthy of the government of the Republic.”

27 January 1816: Les Cayes - Letter from J. Marimon to General Marion, in view of the excesses committed by several armed corsairs in Cartagena ... "The undersigned begs you, General, to order the captains of the boats under the Carthaginian flag sic) to deposit in your hands their patents or letters of mark, to refrain from displaying their flag, temporarily and until receiving the orders that President Pétion will deign to communicate to you on this subject ... "

January 30, 1816: Letter of Pétion to General Marion: "I have received, my dear General, your letter of the 27th of this month, with the documents it contains. I agree with the measure you have taken with regard to the vessels under the Carthaginian flag, which are in the port of Les Cayes, tending to prevent any act which might compromise the Republic in the hospitality...”

February 5, 1816: Letter of Pétion to General Marion: "At the request made to you by the Congressional Commissioner of the United States of New Granada, I urge you, in all your conduct, not to lose for it is important that the system of perfect neutrality which we profess should be followed exactly, and to avoid any misunderstandings which might give uneasiness to any other government, which is of our utmost importance."

In 1816, with Haitian soldiers and vital material support, Bolívar landed in Venezuela and fulfilled his promise to President Alexandre Pétion to free Spanish America's slaves on 2 June 1816.

== Death ==
Marion remained in the Cayes until his death on 20 November 1831. He paid with his life for his efforts to restore the city after the hurricane of 1831 (August 12–13). Hérard Dumesle, the author of the Manifesto of Praslin, made his eulogy in the Cathedral of Les Cayes.

== See also ==
- History of Haiti
