= Ook Chung =

Canadian writer

Ook Chung, born in Japan in 1963, is a Québécois writer. Chung was born to Korean parents in Japan and immigrated to Canada at the age of 2. He studied French literature at McGill and Concordia universities before obtaining his doctorate at McGill.

== Awards ==
- 2002: John Glassco Prize (translation into French of Kerri Sakamoto's The Electrical Field)
- 2002: Prix littéraire Canada-Japon (Kimchi)
- 2000: Prix littéraire Canada-Japon (Proposed but never realized Testament de Tokyo)

== Works ==
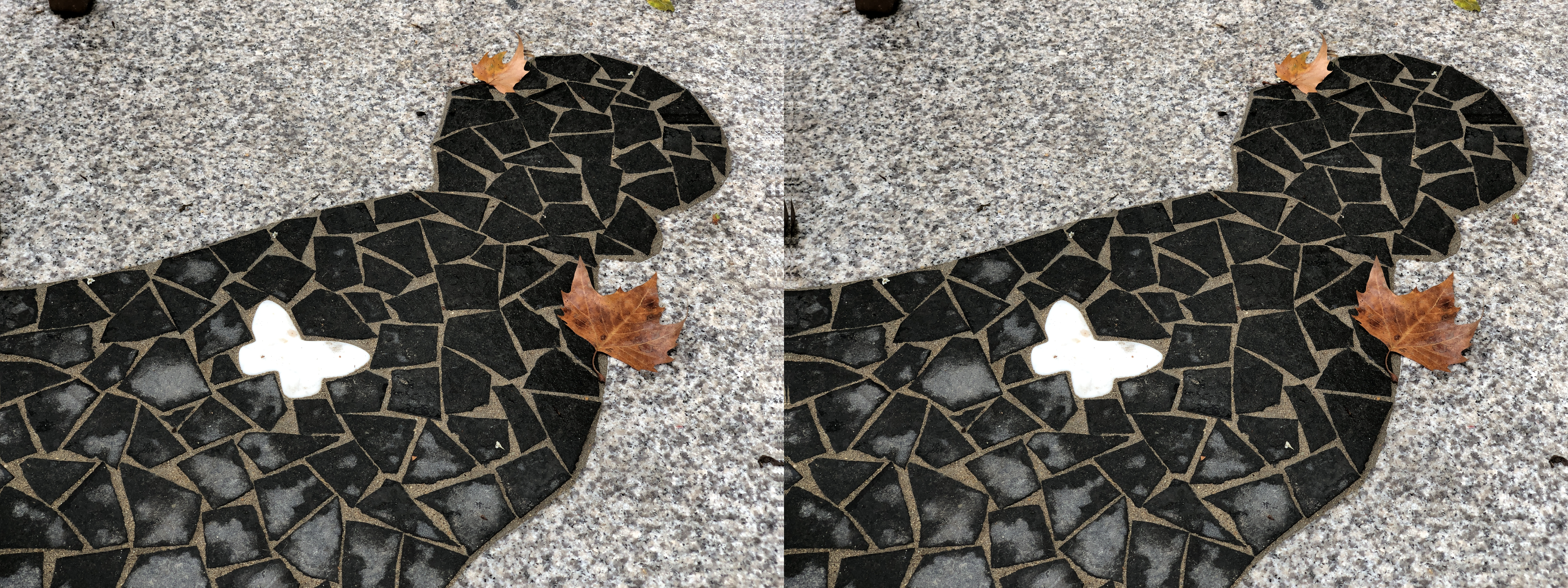
One of the illustrations in La jeune fille de la paix is this image of the Peace Statue in Berlin

- 1994: Nouvelles orientales et désorientées, Montreal, L'Hexagone. (ISBN 2890065146)
- 2001: Le Clézio, une écriture prophétique, Paris, Imago. (ISBN 2911416481)
- 2001: Kimchi, Paris, Le Serpent à plumes. (ISBN 2842612620)
- 2003: L'Expérience interdite, Montreal, Boréal. (ISBN 2764602391)
- 2003: Contes Butô, Montreal, Boréal. (ISBN 2764602529)
- 2012: La Trilogie coréenne, Montreal, Boréal. (ISBN 9782764621073)
- 2021: La jeune fille de la paix, Montreal. (ISBN 9782896498659)
