= Philippe-Ignace François Aubert de Gaspé =

Canadian writer

Philippe-Ignace-François Aubert de Gaspé, Jr. (French pronunciation: [filip iɲas fʁɑ̃swa obɛʁ də ɡaspe]), or simply Philippe Aubert de Gaspé (1814–7 March 1841), was a Canadian writer and is credited with writing the first French Canadian novel.

== Career ==
Philippe-Ignace-Francois was tutored by his father Philippe-Joseph and studied at the seminary of Nicolet. He worked as a journalist at the Quebec Mercury and Le Canadien. He clashed with Lower Canada Asemblyman Edmund Bailey O'Callaghan, who questioned his integrity, and was sentenced to a month in prison in November 1835. In February of the following year, he unleashed a stink bomb of asafoetida in the lobby of the National Assembly of Quebec.

Under criminal charges, he laid low at his father's manor. During this period, in 1837, he wrote the novel L'influence d'un livre (The Influence of a Book). The story is based on historical events, legends and folksongs of the Saint-Jean-Port-Joly area, inspired by his father's recollections. Despite now being recognized as a landmark in Canadian literature, the book was not well received at the time of publication.

Philippe died shortly afterwards in Halifax. He was buried in front of the present-day Spring Garden Road Public Library.

== Grave ==
Philippe-Ignace-Francois is among approximately 4,500 people laid to rest in Grafton Park, downtown Halifax. The graves of the people who died in the Poor House were covered by a firehouse and later a library without any public recognition of their burial.

== Works ==
- Le chercheur de trésors ou L'influence d'un livre. roman. 1837 online
  - Transl. Claire Holden Rothman: The Influence of a Book. Robert Davies Publ. 1993 ISBN 1895854105 John Glassco Translation Award

== See also ==
- Aubert de Gaspé (disambiguation), for other members of the family
