= Jean Ignace de La Ville =

French churchman and diplomat

- Titular Bishop of Tricomia
- Church: Catholic Church
- See: Tricomia
- In office: 28 February 1774 – 15 April 1774
- Predecessor: Juan Manuel Moscoso y Peralta
- Successor: Pierre Joseph Perreau

Orders
- Consecration: 10 April 1774 by Charles-Auguste Le Quien de La Neufville

Personal details
- Born: 20 September 1702 Sainte-Marie-de-Gosse, Gascony, Kingdom of France
- Died: 15 April 1774 (aged 71)

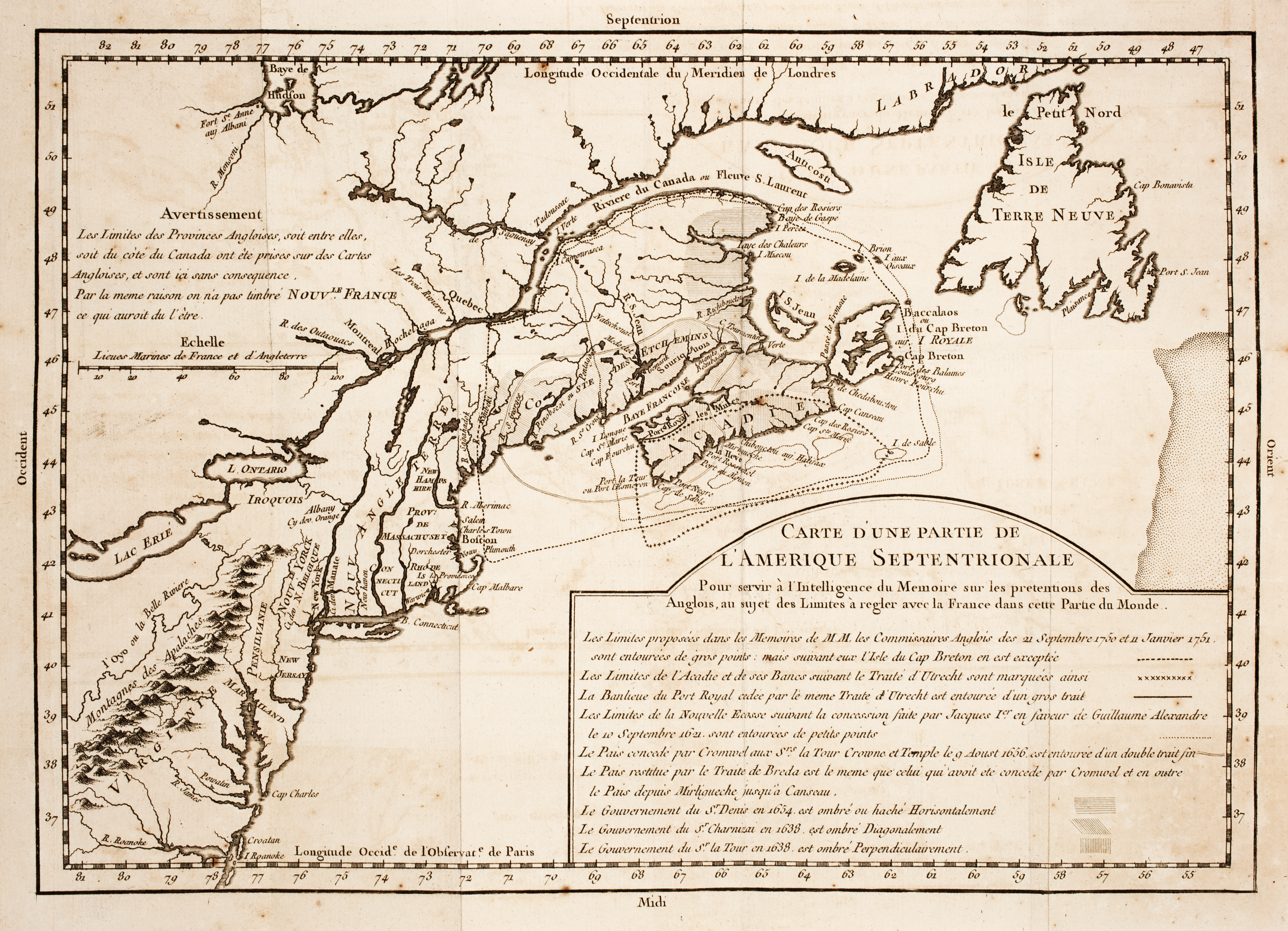
"Carte d'une partie de l'Amerique septentrionale", French map of East Canada.

Jean Ignace de La Ville (1690 in Bayonne – 15 April 1774) was a French churchman and diplomat. He was a Bishop of the titular see of Tricomie, a diplomat and a high ranking civil servant for the Foreign Minister d'Argenson.

In 1740 he edited the Œuvres spirituelles of François Fénelon and in 1746 was elected member of the Académie française. With Étienne de Silhouette and Barrin La Galissonnière, he authored the Mémoires des commissaires du Roi et de ceux de Sa Majesté britannique, sur les possessions et les droits respectifs des deux couronnes en Amérique, published in four volumes in 1755–57.

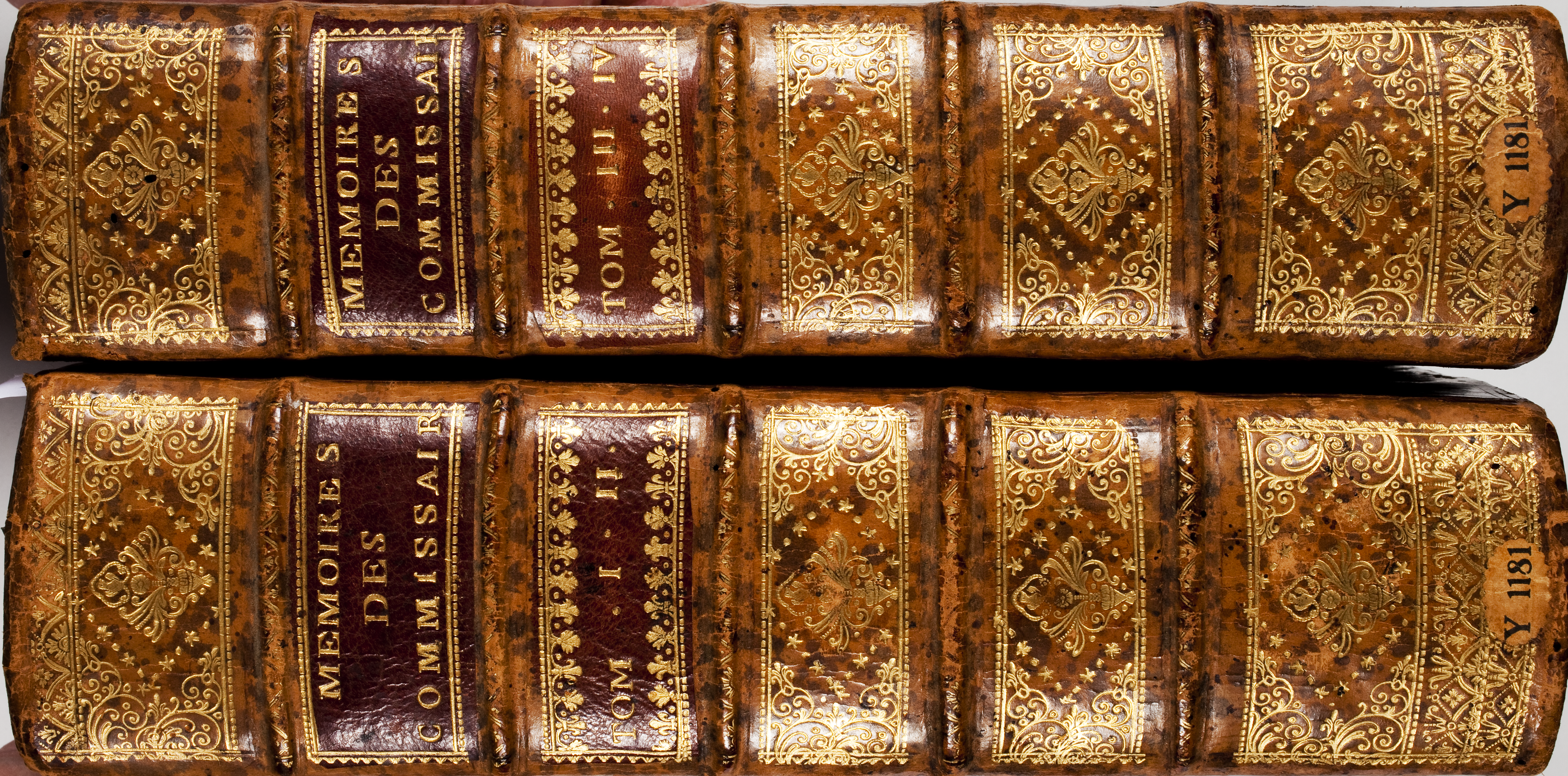
Two volumes of Mémoires des commissaires du Roi et de ceux de Sa Majesté britannique.., bound in leather.
