= Tomas Tranströmer =

Swedish poet and psychologist (1931–2015)

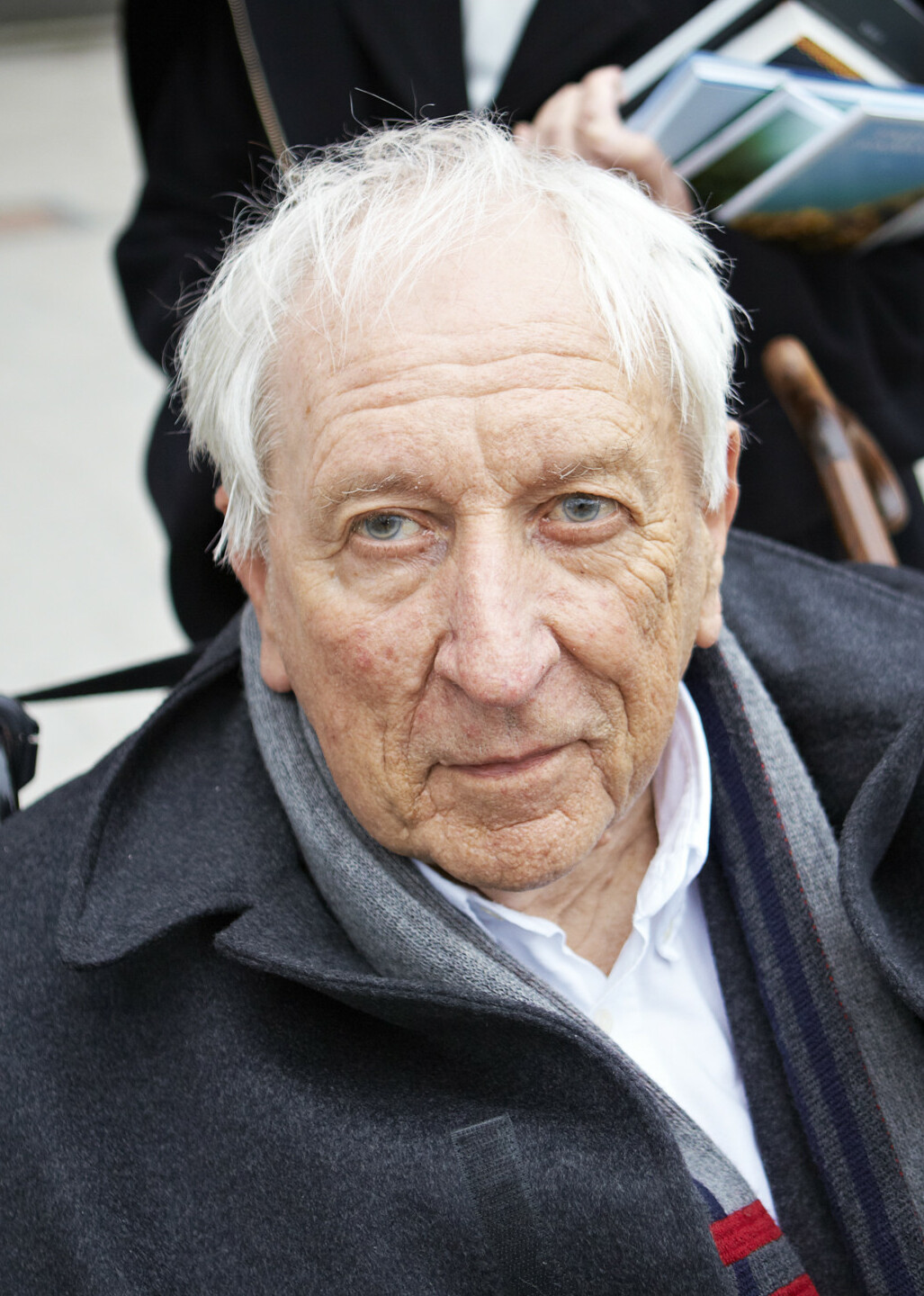
- Tranströmer in 2012
- Born: Tomas Gösta Tranströmer; 15 April 1931; Stockholm, Sweden
- Died: 26 March 2015 (aged 83); Stockholm, Sweden
- Education: Stockholm University
- Occupations: Poet; psychologist
- Spouse: Monika Bladh
- Writing career
- Period: 1954–2015
- Notable works: The Half-Finished Heaven; Windows and Stones; Baltics; For the Living and the Dead; The Sorrow Gondola
- Notable awards: Nobel Prize in Literature; 2011

Tomas Gösta Tranströmer (Swedish: [ˈtʊ̌mːas ˈjœ̂sːta ˈtrâːnˌstrœmːɛr]; 15 April 1931 – 26 March 2015) was a Swedish poet, psychologist and translator. His poems captured the long winters in Sweden, the rhythm of the seasons and the palpable, atmospheric beauty of nature. Tranströmer's work is also characterized by a sense of mystery and wonder underlying the routine of everyday life, a quality which often gives his poems a religious dimension. He has been described as a Christian poet.

Tranströmer is acclaimed as one of the most important Scandinavian writers since the Second World War. Critics praised his poetry for its accessibility, even in translation. His poetry has been translated into over 60 languages. He received many awards for his poetry, including the 2011 Nobel Prize in Literature.

== Life and work ==
=== Early life ===
Tranströmer was born in Stockholm in 1931 and raised by his mother Helmy, a schoolteacher, following her divorce from his father, Gösta Tranströmer, an editor. He received his secondary education at the Södra Latin Gymnasium in Stockholm, where he began writing poetry. In addition to selected journal publications, his first collection of poems, 17 Poems, was published in 1954. He continued his education at Stockholm University, graduating as a psychologist in 1956 with additional studies in history, religion and literature. Between 1960 and 1966, Tranströmer split his time between working as a psychologist at the Roxtuna centre for juvenile delinquents and writing poetry. He worked as a psychologist at the Labor Market Institute in Västerås from 1965 to 1990.

=== Poetry ===
Tranströmer is considered to be one of the "most influential Scandinavian poet[s] of recent decades". Tranströmer published 15 collected works over his extensive career, which have been translated into over 60 languages. An English translation by Robin Fulton of his entire body of work, New Collected Poems, was published in the UK in 1987 and expanded in 1997. Following the publication of The Great Enigma, Fulton's edition was further expanded into The Great Enigma: New Collected Poems, published in the US in 2006 and as an updated edition of New Collected Poems in the UK in 2011. He published a short autobiography, Minnena ser mig (The Memories see me), in 1993.

By the mid-1960s, Tranströmer became close friends with poet Robert Bly. The two corresponded frequently, and Bly translated Tranströmer's poems into English. In 2001 Bonniers, Tranströmer's publisher, released Air Mail, a work consisting of Tranströmer's and Bly's day-to-day correspondence on personal, contemporary and literary matters c. 1965–1991 – in a style that vividly conveyed how close friends the two had soon become. Bly also helped arrange readings for his fellow poet in America. The Syrian poet Adunis helped spread Tranströmer's fame in the Arab world, accompanying him on reading tours.

In the 1970s, other poets accused Tranströmer of being detached from his own age, since he did not deal overtly with social and political issues in his poems and novels. His work, though, lies within and further develops the Modernist and Expressionist/Surrealist language of 20th-century poetry; his clear, seemingly simple pictures from everyday life and nature, in particular, reveals a mystic insight to the universal aspects of the human mind.

Tranströmer went to Bhopal immediately after the gas tragedy in 1984, and alongside Indian poets such as K. Satchidanandan, took part in a poetry reading session outside the plant. Late in his life, he tried his hand at some Swedish haiku.

One of his poems was read at the assassinated politician Anna Lindh's memorial service in 2003. Tranströmer suffered a stroke in 1990 that left him partially paralyzed and unable to speak; however, he continued to write and publish poetry through the early 2000s.

=== Music ===
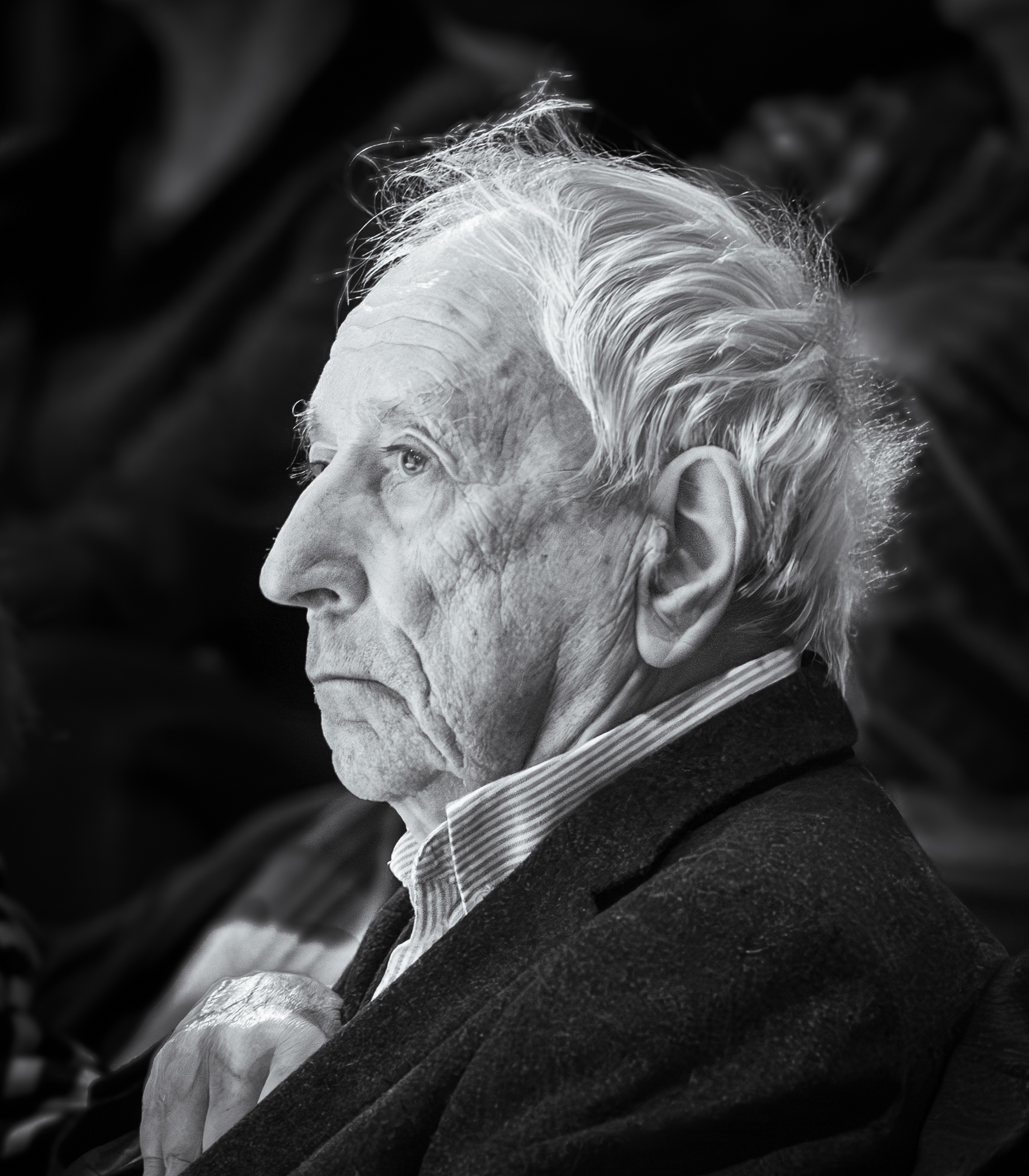
Photographic portrait of Tranströmer by Frankie Fouganthin, 2014

Tranströmer played the piano throughout his life; after his stroke, he taught himself to play with his left hand. He often said that the playing was a way for him to continue living after the stroke.

Tranströmer's daughter Emma is a concert mezzo-soprano. In 2011 she released the album Dagsmeja, containing settings of 18 of Tranströmer's poems.

Many composers and musicians have worked with his poems. Among these are Jan Garbarek, Ulf Grahn, Madeleine Isaksson, Margareta Hallin, Lars Edlund, Sven-David Sandström, Jan Sandström and Anders Eliasson.

=== Death ===
Tranströmer died in Stockholm on 26 March 2015 aged 83.

== Works ==
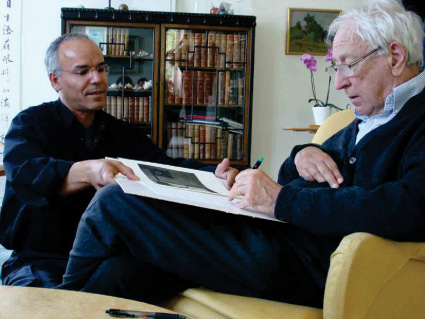
Tranströmer (right) signs Vecka nr. II, a book by Iraqi-Swedish artist Modhir Ahmed (left). The book is a reflection of his poem "Galleriet", which was first published in the 1978 collection Sanningsbarriären.

Books of poetry

- 17 Poems (17 dikter), Bonniers, 1954
- Secrets on the Way (Hemligheter på vägen), Bonnier, 1958
- The Half-Finished Heaven (Den halvfärdiga himlen), Bonnier, 1962
- Bells and Tracks (Klanger och spår), Bonnier, 1966
- Seeing in the Dark (Mörkerseende), Författarförlaget, 1970
- Paths (Stigar), Författarförlaget, 1973, ISBN 978-91-7054-110-0
- Baltics (Östersjöar), Bonnier, 1974
- The Truthbarrier (Sanningsbarriären), Bonnier, 1978, ISBN 978-91-0-043684-1
- The Wild Market Square (Det vilda torget) Bonnier, 1983, ISBN 978-91-0-046048-8
- For the Living and the Dead (För levande och döda), Bonnier, 1989
- The Sorrow Gondola (Sorgegondolen), Bonnier, 1996, ISBN 978-91-0-056232-8
- Prison (Fängelse), Edition Edda, 2001 (from 1959), ISBN 978-91-89352-10-0
- The Great Enigma (Den stora gåtan), Bonnier, 2004, ISBN 978-91-0-010310-1

Other

- Memories Look at Me (Minnena ser mig), Bonnier, 1993, prose memoir ISBN 978-91-0-055716-4
- Air Mail: Brev 1964-1990, Bonnier, 2001, correspondence with Robert Bly ISBN 978-91-0-057384-3
- Galleriet: Reflected in Vecka nr. II (2007), an artist book by Modhir Ahmed

== Translations of his work ==
into English

- Twenty Poems tr. Robert Bly, Seventies Press, 1970
- Night Vision: Mörkerseende tr. Robert Bly, London Magazine Editions, 1972, SBN 900626 74 7
- Windows and Stones tr. May Swenson & Leif Sjoberg, University of Pittsburgh Press, 1972; ISBN 978-0-8229-3241-3
- Selected Poems, Tomas Tranströmer, tr. Robin Fulton, (included with Paavo Haavikko), Penguin Modern European Poets, 1974; ISBN 978-0140421576
- Baltics: Östersjöar, tr. Samuel Charters, Oyez, Berkeley, 1975 ISBN 978-0-903375-51-1; new edition Tavern Books 2012, ISBN 978-1-935635-14-7
- Baltics: Östersjöar, tr. Robin Fulton, Oasis Books, London, 1980; ISBN 0-903375-51-6
- Selected Poems, translator Robin Fulton, Ardis Publishers, 1981, ISBN 978-0-88233-462-2
- The Blue House: Prose Poems, Thunder City Press, 1983
- The Wild Market Square: Det vilda torget tr. John F. Deane, Dedalus Press, Dublin, 1985; ISBN 0-948268-05-0
- Collected Poems, Translator Robin Fulton, Bloodaxe Books, 1987, ISBN 978-1-85224-023-3
- Tomas Tranströmer: Selected Poems, 1954–1986, Editor Robert Hass, Publisher Ecco Press, 1987 ISBN 978-0-88001-113-6
- Sorrow Gondola: Sorgegondolen, tr. Robin Fulton, Dufour Editions, 1994, ISBN 978-1-873790-48-9; Dufour Editions, Incorporated, 1997, ISBN 978-0-8023-9070-7
- For the Living and the Dead: För levande och döda, tr. John F. Deane; The Dedalus Press, Dublin, 1994; ISBN 1-873790-48-1
- New Collected Poems tr. Robin Fulton, Bloodaxe Books, 1997, ISBN 978-1-85224-413-2
- Selected Poems Transtromer, Translator May Swenson, Eric Sellin, HarperCollins, 1999, ISBN 978-0-88001-403-8
- The Half-Finished Heaven tr. Robert Bly, Graywolf Press, 2001, ISBN 978-1-55597-351-3
- The Deleted World tr. Robin Robertson, Enitharmon Press, 2006, ISBN 978-1-904634-48-5; Enitharmon Press, 2006, ISBN 978-1-904634-51-5
- The Great Enigma: New Collected Poems. Translated by Robin Fulton. New Directions. 2006. ISBN 978-0-8112-1672-2.; republished 2011
- The Sorrow Gondola tr. Michael McGriff and Mikaela Grassl, Green Integer, 2010, ISBN 978-1-933382-44-9
- The Deleted World tr. Robin Robertson, Farrar, Straus and Giroux USA, Enitharmon Press UK, 2011; ISBN 978-0374533533
- New Collected Poems tr. Robin Fulton, expanded edition Bloodaxe Books, 2011, ISBN 978-1-85224-413-2
- Inspired Notes, tr. John F. Deane, Dedalus Press, Dublin, 2011 (combining his 1985 and 1994 translations above); ISBN 978-1906614539
- Bright Scythe: Selected Poems by Tomas Tranströmer, tr. Patty Crane, Bilingual edition, Sarabande Books, 2015; ISBN 978-1941411216
- The Blue House: Collected Works of Tomas Tranströmer, tr. Patty Crane, Bilingual edition, Copper Canyon Press, 2023; ISBN 978-1556596858

into other languages

- Milan Richter has translated Tranströmer into Czech
- J. Bernlef has translated Tranströmer's entire work of poetry into Dutch.
- Jacques Outin translated them into French.
- Hanns Grössel has translated several works of Tranströmer into German.
- Galit Hasan-Rokem has translated Tranströmer's entire work of poetry into Hebrew.
- Maria Cristina Lombardi translated some works of Tranströmer into Italian.
- Eiko Duke-Soei has translated The Sorrow Gondola into Japanese.
- Morteza Saghafian has translated Tranströmer's work into Persian.
- Leonard Neuger has translated several of Tranströmer's anthologies into Polish.
- Dan Shafran has translated A Page of the Night-Book (Nattboksblad) Pagini din cartea nopții: poeme (Polirom, 2003) and The Great Enigma (Den stora gåtan) Taina cea mare (Polirom, 2005) into Romanian.
- Milan Richter has translated the collected poems of Tranströmer into Slovak (Medzi allegrom a lamentom, 2001)
- Roberto Mascaró has translated Tranströmer's work into Spanish.

== Awards and honours ==
- 1966: Bellman Prize (Sweden)
- 1981: Petrarch Prize (Germany)
- 1988; Pilot Prize (Sweden)
- 1990: Neustadt International Prize for Literature (US)
- 1990: Nordic Council Literature Prize, for For the Living and the Dead (Scandinavia)
- 1991: Swedish Academy Nordic Prize (Sweden)
- 1992: Horst Bienek Prize for Poetry (Germany)
- 1996: Augustpriset, for Sorgegondolen (Sweden)
- 1998: Jan Smrek Prize (Slovakia)
- 2003: Struga Poetry Evenings Golden Wreath (Macedonia)
- 2004: International Nonino Prize (Italy)
- 2007: The Griffin Trust, Lifetime Recognition Award (Griffin Poetry Prize) (Canada)
- 2011: Title of Professor (Swedish: Professors namn), granted by the Cabinet of Sweden (Sweden)
- 2011: Nobel Prize in Literature (Sweden) "because, through his condensed, translucent images, he gives us fresh access to reality"

He won the International Poetry Forum's Swedish Award.

== See also ==
- List of Nobel laureates in Literature
