= Ignace Hellenberg =

French art dealer (died 2004)

- Died: (died 2004)
- Occupation: Art dealer

Ignace Hellenberg (died 2004) was a French art dealer.

== Early life ==
Ignace Hellenberg was the son of Sigmund and Betty Hellenberg.

== Career ==
Hellenberg was a French art dealer, based in Paris.

== Death ==
Hellenberg died in 2004.

== Legacy ==
In his will, he left more than NIS 200 million to the Israeli state to create rehabilitation hospitals for disabled Israel Defense Forces veterans. In 2017, the Southern Regional Medical Center opened, with about one-third of the NIS 60 million ($16.8 million) expenditure coming from Hellenberg's bequest.

Hellenberg donated numerous artworks to the State of Israel. These include an 1881 Henri Fantin-Latour still life, Gladioli and Roses, and an 1887 Vincent van Gogh oil Entrance to park Voyer d’Argenson in Asnières, both on permanent loan to the Israel Museum, Jerusalem.
