= Samuel Wong =

Hong Kong-Canadian conductor

- 黃大德
- Born: 1963 (age 62–63); British Hong Kong
- Education: Harvard University (AB, MD)
- Occupation: Ophthalmologist
- Website: samwongmd.com

Samuel Wong (Chinese: 黃大德; born 1963) is a Hong Kong-born Canadian conductor and ophthalmologist.

A 1984 graduate of Harvard College, Wong trained at Harvard Medical School and Columbia University College of Physicians and Surgeons. Dr. Wong is an eye surgeon practicing in Manhattan and Brooklyn.

In another career, he has conducted many international orchestras including the New York Philharmonic, Seattle and Houston Symphonies, Toronto and Montreal Symphonies, orchestras in Italy, Spain, Belgium, and Israel. Wong led the New York Philharmonic in December 1990 after the untimely death of Leonard Bernstein, and replaced Zubin Mehta in Washington D.C. in January 1991 when Maestro Mehta traveled to Israel in an act of solidarity with the Israel Philharmonic during the Persian Gulf War.
