= The Sorrow Gondola =

Book by Tomas Tranströmer

- First edition
- Author: Tomas Tranströmer
- Original title: Sorgegondolen
- Translator: Robin Fulton
- Language: Swedish
- Publisher: Albert Bonniers förlag
- Publication date: 1996
- Publication place: Sweden
- English publication date: 1997
- Pages: 37
- ISBN: 9100562327

The Sorrow Gondola (Swedish: Sorgegondolen) is a 1996 poetry collection by the Swedish writer Tomas Tranströmer. The title refers to the composition La lugubre gondola by Franz Liszt. It was the first collection by Tranströmer published after his 1990 stroke. It received the August Prize.

== Reception ==
The book was reviewed in Publishers Weekly, where the critic wrote that while the author's stroke is never mentioned explicitly, the collection "centers unmistakably on the controlled anguish that the 66-year-old poet's physical condition--and encroaching mortality--imposes." The review continued: "What saves the collection from morbidness is the formal beauty and remorselessly compressed clarity of the writing. Indeed, the almost telegraphic brevity of the poems is the volume's only concession to Transtromer's handicap. With the exception of the four-page title poem, a meditation on Wagner's final months, most of the pieces are only a few stanzas long, yet they retain all the force of the poet's earlier work."

== See also ==
- 1996 in poetry
- Swedish literature
