= Pierre-Ignace Aubert de Gaspé =

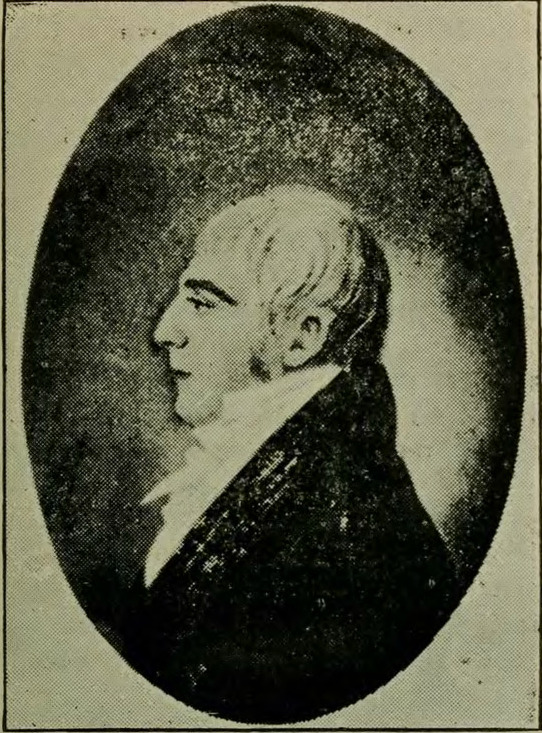
- Born: 14 August 1758; Quebec City
- Died: 13 February 1823; Saint-Jean-Port-Joli
- Occupation: Politician
- Spouse: Catherine Tarieu de Lanaudière
- Children: Philippe-Joseph Aubert de Gaspé
- Father: Ignace Aubert de Gaspé

Pierre-Ignace Aubert de Gaspé (French pronunciation: [pjɛʁ iɲas obɛʁ də ɡaspe]; August 14, 1758 – February 13, 1823) was a seigneur and political figure in Lower Canada.

He was born in Quebec City in 1758, the son of Ignace-Philippe Aubert de Gaspé, and studied at the Petit Séminaire de Québec. He helped defend the province against the invasion by the Americans in 1775–6. In 1786, he married Catherine, the daughter of Charles-Louis Tarieu de Lanaudière. He was named justice of the peace for Quebec district in 1786. In 1789, Aubert de Gaspé inherited the seigneury of Port-Joly after the death of his mother. He purchased the seigneury of Islet-à-la-Peau (Demi-Lieue) the following year. In 1812, he was named to the Legislative Council of Lower Canada. He served in the local militia during the War of 1812, becoming colonel in 1814.

He died in Saint-Jean-Port-Joli in 1823.
