= Henri de Saint-Ignace =

Belgian Carmelite theologian

Henri de Saint-Ignace (b. in 1630, at Ath in Hainaut, Belgium; d. in 1719 or 1720, near Liège) was a Belgian Carmelite theologian.

== Life ==
A professor of moral theology, de Saint-Ignace participated in the controversies of his time on grace and free will. He professing himself a follower of Augustine of Hippo and Thomas Aquinas, but was also influenced by the views of Baius and Jansenius.

A long sojourn in Rome during the pontificate of Pope Clement XI swayed de Saint-Ignace away from Jansenism, but did not diminish his antipathy towards the Jesuits, whom he opposed vigorously all his life.

== Works ==
The chief work by de Saint-Ignace is the three-volume "Ethica amoris, or the theology of the saints (especially of St. Augustine and St. Thomas) on the doctrine of love and morality strenuously defended against the new opinions and thoroughly discussed in connection with the principal controversies of our time", published in 1709. It drew heavily on the 1686 "Tempestas novaturiensis" of Alexandre de Sainte-Therese, took controversial positions on the administration of the Eucharist, and praised the later-condemned "Reflexions morales" of Pasquier Quesnel.

Other theologians criticized Ethica Amoris as pro-Jansenist. It was forbidden at Rome by the decrees of 12 September 1714, and 29 July 1722, condemned by the Parlement of Paris, and censured by the Carmelites in the 1715 Memoires de Trévoux.

In 1713, before the appearance of the Bull Unigenitus, de Saint-Ignace published "Gratiae per se efficacis seu augustiniano-thomisticae defensio", a defence of Jansenism. This provoked a vigorous reply from P. Meyer, S.J. (Brussels, 1715). Defending himself from Jesuit criticism, de Saint-Ignace wrote "Molinismus profligatus" (Cologne, 1717) and "Artes jesuiticae in sustinendis pertinaciter novitatibus laxitatibusque sociorum" (4th ed., Strasburg, 1717).
