= Robin Fulton =

Scottish poet and translator

Robin Fulton is a Scottish poet and translator, born on 6 May 1937 on the Isle of Arran. Since 2011 he has published under the name Robin Fulton Macpherson.

== Biography ==
The son of a Church of Scotland minister, Robin Fulton was born in Arran in 1937. After attending primary school in Arran and then Glasgow, he had his secondary schooling in Golspie, Sutherland when his parents moved to the Scottish Highlands. After taking a degree in English Language and Literature at Edinburgh University, he went on to gain an MA in 1959 and a PhD with a thesis on “Social Criticism in Scottish Literature 1480-1560” in 1972. From 1969 to 1971 he also held the Writers' Fellowship at Edinburgh University. Formerly he had taught school but afterwards moved to what was then the District College of Stavanger in Norway, rising to senior lecturer before retiring in 2006.

Fulton’s literary engagement with Scotland continued, however. Having edited Lines Review and the associated press from 1967-1976, he was later responsible for editing the selected poems of Iain Crichton Smith (1983) and was especially dedicated to editing and contextualising the work of Robert Garioch. Collections of his own poems began appearing in 1963, initially in Scotland, then from English and US presses. He has also translated many Scandinavian poets, which has gained him the Swedish Artur Lunkvist Award (1977), Swedish Academy Awards (1978, 1998) and the Bernard Shaw Translation Prize (2010).

== Principal publications ==
=== Poetry ===
- A Manner of Definition (G. Gordon, London 1963)
- Instances (Macdonald Publishers, Edinburgh 1967)
- Inventories (Caithness Books, Thurso 1969)
- The Spaces between the Stones (New Rivers Press, New York 1971)
- The Man with the Surbahar (Macdonald 1971)
- Tree Lines (New Rivers Press 1974)
- Between Flights (Interim Press, Egham 1976)
- Following a Mirror (Oasis Books, London 1979)
- Selected Poems 1963 – 1978 (Macdonald Publishers 1980)
- Fields of Focus (Anvil Press, London 1982), a Poetry Book Society Recommendation
- Coming down to Earth and Spring Is Soon (Oasis Books, and Shearsman Books, Plymouth, 1990)
- From a High Window and other poems (Oasis Books, 2002)
- Homing: ten poems (Oasis Books 2003)
- A Northern Habitat: Collected Poems 1960-2010, as Robin Fulton Macpherson (Marick Press, Michigan, 2013)
- Unseen Islands and other poems, Marick Press 2019
- Arrivals of Light (Shearsman Books 2020)

=== Poetry in translation ===
- Sekunden överlever stenen, translated into Swedish by Johannes Edfelt, Lasse Söderberg & Tomas Tranströmer (Ellerströms, Lund, 1996)
- Grenzflug, translated into German by Margitt Lehbert (Edition Rugerup, Hörby, 2008)
- Poemas, translated into Spanish by Circe Maia (Rebeca Line Editoras, Montevideo, 2013)

=== Criticism ===
- Contemporary Scottish Poetry: Individuals and Contexts (Macdonald 1974)
- The Way the Words Are Taken: selected essays (Macdonald 1989)

=== Translated authors ===
- An Italian Quartet: Versions after Saba, Ungaretti, Montale, Quasimodo (Alan Ross, London 1966)
- Blok's "Twelve" (Akros, Preston, Lancashire 1968)
- Lars Gustafsson: Selected Poems (New Rivers Press, New York 1972)
- Gunnar Harding: They Killed Sitting Bull and other poems (London Magazine Editions, 1973); Starnberger See (Oasis Books, 1983)
- Tomas Tranströmer: Selected Poems, (Penguin Books, 1976); Selected Poems (Ardis, Ann Arbor, Michigan 1980); How the Late Autumn Night Novel Begins (Sceptre Press, Knotting, Bedfordshire, 1980); Baltics (Oasis Books, 1980); The Truth Barrier (Oasis Books 1984); Collected Poems (Bloodaxe, Newcastle upon Tyne 1987); New Collected Poems (Bloodaxe and Dufour Editions, Chester Springs, Pennsylvania, 1997); The Great Enigma: New Collected Poems (New Directions, New York 2006); Memories Look At Me : A Memoir, (New Directions 2011)
- Östen Sjöstrand: The Hidden Music and other poems (Oleander Press, Cambridge 1975)
- Werner Aspenström: Selected Poems (Oasis Books 1976); The Blue Whale and other prose pieces (Oasis Books 1981)
- Staffan Bergsten: Mary Poppins and Myth (Almqvist & Wiksell, Stockholm 1978)
- Johannes Edfelt: Family Tree: Thirteen Prose Poems (Oasis Books 1981)
- Kjell Espmark: Béla Bartók Against the Third Reich (Norstedts, Stockholm, and Oasis Books, 1985); Lend Me Your Voice (Marick Press, 2011); Outside the Calendar (Marick Press 2012); Inner Space (Marick Press 2014)
- Olav Hauge: Don't Give Me the Whole Truth: Selected Poems (Anvil Press, London, 1985; White Pine Press, Buffalo, New York, 1990), with James Greene and Siv Hennum; Leaf Huts and Snow Houses (Anvil Press Poetry, 2003), Poetry Book Society recommendation
- Stig Dagerman: German Autumn (Quartet Books, London 1988; University of Minnesota 2011)
- Pär Lagerkvist: Guest of Reality and other stories (Quartet Encounters, 1989)
- Preparations for flight and other Swedish stories (Forest Books, London 1990)
- Four Swedish Poets: Tranströmer, Eva Ström, Lennart Sjögren, Espmark (White Pine Press 1990)
- Five Swedish Poets: Espmark, Sjögren, Ström, Staffan Söderblom, Aspenström (Norvik Press, Norwich 1997)
- Henrik Nordbrandt: My Life, My Dream (Dedalus Press, Dublin 2002)
- Harry Martinson: Chickweed Wintergreen (Bloodaxe 2010)
