= Iggy =

- Gender: Unisex
- Language: English

Origin
- Languages: Latin, English
- Origin: Diminutive form of Ignatius and Ignatia
- Region of origin: English-speaking world

Other names
- Related names: Ignatius, Ignatia, Ignacio, Ignazio, Ignacy, Ignat, Ignatz, Ignaz, Ignác, Ignjat, Iñaki

Iggy or Iggie is a unisex name and it is often a short form of the Roman Latin names Ignatia (feminine) and Ignatius (masculine), or their derivatives in other European languages. As such the name is derived ultimately from the Etruscan language family name Egnat, the meaning of which is unknown. (The Romans added the Latin nominative endings -ia and -ius.) A spelling with an initial "I" later became dominant, possibly because of a resemblance to the Latin word ignis "fire".

Iggy or Iggie may also refer to:

== People ==
- Iggy Pop, stage name of American punk rock singer and occasional actor James Newell Osterberg, Jr. (born 1947)
- Iggy Azalea, stage name of Australian rapper Amethyst Amelia Kelly (born 1990)
- Iggy Arroyo (1950–2012), Filipino politician
- Iggy Clarke (born 1952), Irish retired hurler
- Jarome Iginla (born 1977), Canadian National Hockey League player
- Ralph Ignatowski (1926–1945), U.S. Marine tortured and killed at the Battle of Iwo Jima
- Andre Iguodala (born 1984), American basketball player
- Michael Ignatieff (born 1947), historian and Canadian politician
- Iggy Jones (c. 1927 – 1992), Gaelic footballer from Northern Ireland
- Iggy Katona (1916–2003), American stock car racer
- Iggy O'Donnell (1876 – c. 1946), Australian rugby union player
- Iggy Shevak (1918–1985), American jazz musician from the 1930s to at least the '50s
- Marshall Shurnas (1922–2006), American football player nicknamed "Iggie"
- Iggy Strange Dahl, Swedish songwriter
- Iggie Wolfington (1919–2004), American stage actor
- "Iggy the Eskimo", a girlfriend or acquaintance of Syd Barrett

== Fictional characters ==
- Iggy, from the anime Ergo Proxy
- Iggy, from the Japanese manga JoJo's Bizarre Adventure
- Iggy, a friend of the comics character Little Lulu
- Iggy, one of the main characters from James Patterson's Maximum Ride book series
- Iggy, a friend character in the 1993 film Surf Ninjas
- Iggy Arbuckle, the title character of a Canadian animated TV series
- Iggy Catalpa, a recurring character from the animated show Duckman
- Dr. Ignatius "Iggy" Frome, in the TV show New Amsterdam
- Jim "Iggy" Ignatowski, from the TV series Taxi
- Iggy Iguana, a main character in the Canadian children's TV series Under the Umbrella Tree
- Iggy Koopa, one of the Koopalings in the Super Mario Bros. series

== See also ==
- Iggy's Reckin' Balls, a game for the Nintendo 64
- Italian Greyhound, a dog breed nicknamed the Iggy
