= Ignat (surname) =

Ignat is a Romanian surname that corresponds to the given name Ignat/Ignatius. Notable persons with that name include:

- Doina Florica Ignat (1938–2016), Romanian politician
- Doina Ignat (born 1968), Romanian rower
- Florin Ignat (born 1982), Romanian futsal player
- Gheorghe Ignat (born 1983), Romanian mixed martial arts fighter
- Miron Ignat, Romanian politician, member of parliament 2000–2018
- Nestor Ignat, Romanian journalist, writer and graphic artist

== See also ==
- Ignatenko
- Ignatov
- Ignatyev
- Ignatów (disambiguation)
