= Ignacio =

- Pronunciation: Spanish: [iɣˈnaθjo] (Spain); Spanish: [iɣˈnasjo] (Latin America)
- Gender: Male
- Language: Spanish, Italian

Other gender
- Feminine: Ignacia

Origin
- Origin: Spanish
- Meaning: "fire"

Other names
- Related names: Ignatius, Nacho

Ignacio is a male Spanish name originating in the Latin name "Ignatius" from ignis "fire". This was the name of several saints, including the third bishop of Antioch (who was thrown to wild beasts by emperor Trajan) and Saint Ignatius of Loyola. Variants include the archaic Iñacio, the Italian Ignazio, the German Ignatz, the Catalan Ignasi, the Basque Iñaki, Iñigo, Eneko, and the hypocorisms Nacho/Natxo, Iggy, and Iggie.

Ignacio can refer to:

== Multiple people ==
- Ignacio Chávez (disambiguation)
- Ignacio González (disambiguation)
- Ignacio López (disambiguation)
- Ignacio Rodríguez (disambiguation)

=== Arts and entertainment ===
- Ignacio Aldecoa, 20th-century Spanish author
- Ignacio Agüero (born 1952), Chilean documentary filmmaker
- Ignacio Berroa, 20th-21st-century Cuban jazz drummer
- Ignacio Cervantes Kawanagh, 19th-20th-century Cuban virtuoso pianist and composer
- Ignacio Figueredo, 20th-century Venezuelan folk musician
- Ignacio Lopez, Spanish and Welsh comedian
- Ignacio Merino, 19th-century Peruvian painter
- Ignacio Piñeiro Martínez, 19th-20th-century black Cuban musician and composer
- Ignacio Serricchio, 21st-century Argentinian-American actor
- Ignacio Zuloaga y Zabaleta, 19th-20th-century Spanish painter

=== Military ===
- Ignacio Allende (Ignacio José de Allende y Unzaga), 19th-century captain of the Spanish Army in Mexico
- Ignacio Elizondo, 18th-19th-century New Leonese royalist general of Spanish and Basque ancestry
- Ignacio Zaragoza Seguín, 19th-century general in the Mexican army

=== Politics ===
- Chief Ignacio, a 19th-20th-century leader of the Ute tribe
- Ignacio Agramonte (1841–1873), Cuban revolutionary
- Ignacio Bunye, 20th-21st-century Filipino politician
- Ignacio Comonfort, 19th-century Mexican politician and military officer
- Ignacio Manuel Altamirano Basilio, 19th-century Mexican writer, journalist, teacher and politician
- Ignacio Mier Velazco (born 1961), Mexican politician
- Ignacio Novo Sampol, Cuban exile and militant
- Ignacio Romaní Cantera, Spanish politician
- Ignacio Uriarte (born 1980), Spanish politician
- Ignacio Walker, Chilean politician

=== Religion ===
- Ignacio López de Loyola or Ignatius of Loyola (1491–1556), founder of the Jesuits
- Ignacio Ellacuría, 20th-century Jesuit priest
- Ignacio Martín-Baró, 20th-century Spanish scholar, social psychologist, philosopher and Jesuit priest

=== Science and technology ===
- Ignacio Bernal, 20th-century Mexican anthropologist and archaeologist
- Ignacio Bolívar y Urrutia, 19th-20th-century Spanish naturalist and entomologist
- Ignacio Rodríguez (programmer), Uruguayan programmer
- Ignacio Cirac, Spanish physicist

=== Sports ===
- Ignácio (footballer), 21st-century Brazilian footballer
- Ignacio Ambríz, 20th-21st-century Mexican football defender
- Ignacio Arroyo (basketball), Chilean basketball player
- Ignacio Camacho, 21st-century Spanish footballer for Atlético Madrid
- Ignacio Corleto, 21st-century Argentine Rugby Union footballer
- Ignacio Escamilla, 20th-century Mexican freestyle swimmer
- Ignacio Fragoso, 20th-century Mexican long-distance runner
- Ignacio Garrido, 20th-century Spanish professional golfer
- Ignacio Javier Gómez Novo, or Nacho Novo, 20th-21st-century Spanish footballer
- Ignacio Risso Thomasset, 20th-21st-century Uruguayan footballer
- Ignacio Rodríguez (footballer, born 1956), 20th-century Mexican football goalkeeper
- Ignacio Rodríguez (basketball) (born 1970), 20th-21st-century Spanish basketball player
- Ignacio Rodríguez (footballer, born 2002), Argentine footballer
- Ignacio Sarmiento (born 1986), Spanish hurdler
- Ignacio Scocco, 21st-century Argentine footballer
- Ignacio Fernández (footballer), 21st-century Argentine footballer
- Ignacio Trelles, 20th-century Mexican football player and coach
- Ignacio Vázquez (footballer, born 1971), 20th-century Mexican footballer
- Ignacio Vázquez (footballer, born 1971) Barba, 20th-21st-century Mexican footballer
- Ignacio Zoco Esparza, 20th-century Spanish footballer

=== Other ===
- Ignacio Anaya, 20th-century inventor of nachos
- Ignacio García Malo (1760–1812), Spanish playwright, translator, Hellenist, and writer
- Hermenegildo Ignacio Peralta, 18th-19th-century Spanish settler in California
- Ignacio Ramonet, 20th-century Spanish journalist and writer
- Ignacio Ramos, 20th-21st-century former United States Border Patrol Agent

== Fictional characters ==
- Ignacio Suarez (Ugly Betty), on the television show Ugly Betty
- Nacho Varga, on the television show Better Call Saul
