= Ignjat =

- Gender: male
- Language: Serbo-Croatian

Origin
- Region of origin: Balkans

Other names
- Alternative spelling: Игњат
- Variant forms: Ignazio; Inácio; Ignác; Ignatz
- Related names: Ignatije; Ignjatije; Ignatius; Ignacio; Ognjen

Ignjat (Serbian Cyrillic: Игњат) is a Serbo-Croatian masculine given name, a shortened form of Ignjatije (a variant of the Latin name Ignatius, from ignis, "fire"). It may refer to:

- Ignjat Đurđević (1675–1737) , Ragusan Croatian baroque poet and translator.
- Ignjat Fischer (1870–1948), Croatian architect.
- Ignjat Granitz (1845–1908), Croatian Jewish industrialist, philanthropist and publisher.
- Ignjat Job (1895–1936), Croatian painter from Dubrovnik.
- Ignjat Kirhner (1877–1944), Austro-Hungarian lieutenant, Serbian World War I volunteer, Yugoslav brigadier-general
- Ignjat Sopron (1821–1894), Serbian journalist, publisher, and printer.
- Ignjat Stanimirović (1812–1878), Serbian educator
- Ignác Martinovics (Ignjat Martinović) (1755–1795), Hungarian philosopher, political adventurer of Serb origin.
- Ignác Gyulay (Ignjat Đulaj) (1763–1831), Hungarian military officer.

== Family names ==
- Ignjatić
- Ignjatović

== See also ==
- Ignat
