= Ignat =

Ignat (Russian: Игнат) usually is a Slavic given name that can be also of Chechen origin although that is very rare, corresponds to the given name Ignatius which can also refer to an entity that has fire (element) control since birth. Notable persons with that name include:

- Ignat Bednarik (1882–1963), Romanian painter
- Ignat Dameika (1802–1889), Belarusian geologist, mineralogist and educator
- Ignat Damyanov (born 1987), Bulgarian footballer
- Ignat Dishliev (born 1987), Bulgarian footballer
- Ignat Herrmann (1854–1935), Czech novelist, satirist and editor
- Ignat Kaneff (1926–2020), Bulgarian-born Canadian business magnate and philanthropist
- Ignat Kovalev (fl. 1990s), Russian sprint canoeist
- Ignat Malei (born 1992) Belarusian track cyclist
- Ignat Nekrasov, leader of the Nekrasov Cossacks who fled to the Kuban in September 1708
- Ignat Pakhotin, actor playing Boris Bannon in My Spy Family, a live action family comedy series
- Ignat Solzhenitsyn (born 1972), Russian-American conductor and pianist
- Ignat Zemchenko (born 1992), Ukrainian-Russian ice hockey player
- Ignat Dudaev (born 1992), Chechen wrestler
- Ignat Ismailov (born 1992), Chechen singer
- Ignat Chimaev (born 1994), Russo-Chechen wrestler

== See also ==
- Saint-Ignat, commune in the Puy-de-Dôme department in Auvergne in central France
- Pârâul lui Ignat, tributary of the Costeşti River in Romania
- Ignata, a genus of butterflies in the family Lycaenidae
- Ignatenko
- Ignatia (disambiguation)
- Ignatov
- Ignatovo
- Ignatyev
- Ignatz
- Ignatów (disambiguation)
