= Iñaki =

Iñaki is a male given name. It is a neologism created by Sabino Arana meaning Ignatius, to be a Basque language analog to "Ignacio" in Spanish, "Ignace" in French, and "Ignazio" in Italian, and an alternative to the names Eneko and Íñigo.

== Notable people ==
- Iñaki Abad – Spanish writer
- Iñaki Ábalos – Spanish architect and author
- Iñaki Aguilar – Spanish water polo player
- Iñaki Aiarzagüena – Spanish cyclist
- Iñaki Aizpurúa – Spanish footballer
- Iñaki Alcelay – Spanish footballer
- Iñaki Aldekoa – Spanish politician
- Iñaki Alkiza – Spanish footballer
- Iñaki Alonso – Spanish football manager
- Iñaki Anasagasti – Spanish politician
- Iñaki Antigüedad – Basque politician and geologist
- Iñaki Antón – Spanish musician
- Iñaki Arriola – Spanish footballer
- Iñaki Astiz Ventura – Spanish footballer
- Iñaki Ayarza – Chilean rugby union player
- Iñaki Azkuna – Spanish politician and former mayor of Bilbao
- Iñaki Barrenetxea – Spanish cyclist
- Inaki Basauri – American rugby union player
- Iñaki Basiloff – Argentine swimmer
- Iñaki Bea Jauregi – Spanish footballer
- Iñaki Bergara – Spanish footballer and coach
- Iñaki Berruet – Spanish footballer
- Iñaki Bollaín – Spanish footballer
- Iñaki Bonillas – Mexican artist
- Iñaki Calvo – Venezuelan tennis player
- Iñaki Caña – Spanish footballer
- Iñaki Cañal – Spanish sprinter
- Iñaki de Juana Chaos – Spanish separatist
- Iñaki Descarga – Spanish footballer
- Iñaki Dorronsoro Plazaola – Spanish engineer
- Iñaki Echaniz – French politician
- Iñaki Egaña – Spanish musician
- Iñaki Elejalde – Spanish footballer
- Iñaki Eraña – Spanish footballer and coach
- Iñaki Ereño – Spanish business executive
- Iñaki Gabilondo – Spanish journalist
- Iñaki Garmendia – Spanish footballer
- Iñaki Gastón – Spanish cyclist
- Iñaki Godoy – Mexican actor
- Iñaki Goikoetxea – Spanish footballer
- Iñaki Goirizelaia – Spanish professor of engineering
- Iñaki Goitia Peña – Spanish footballer
- Iñaki Gómez – Canadian race walker
- Iñaki González – Spanish footballer
- Iñaki Gurruchaga – Chilean rugby union player
- Iñaki Hurtado – Spanish footballer
- Iñaki Isasi – Spanish cyclist
- Iñaki Kijera Zelarain – Basque protester
- Iñaki Lafuente – Spanish footballer
- Iñaki Laskurain – Spanish rugby union player
- Iñaki Lejarreta – Spanish cyclist
- Iñaki León – Spanish footballer
- Iñaki Mallona Txertudi – Puerto Rican Roman Catholic bishop
- Iñaki Malumbres – Spanish handball player
- Iñaki Mateu – Argentine rugby union player
- Iñaki Minadeo – Argentine field hockey player
- Iñaki Montes de la Torre – Spanish tennis player
- Iñaki Muñoz – Spanish footballer
- Iñaki Ochoa de Olza – Spanish mountain climber
- Iñaki Olaortua – Spanish footballer
- Iñaki Otxandorena – Basque musician
- Iñaki Oyarzabal – Spanish politician
- Iñaki Peciña – Spanish handball player
- Iñaki Peña – Spanish footballer
- Iñaki Peralta – Spanish economist
- Iñaki Perurena – Basque strongman
- Iñaki Piñuel – Spanish psychologist
- Iñaki Plaza Murga – Spanish musician
- Iñaki Rueda – Spanish Formula One engineer
- Iñaki Ruiz de Pinedo – Spanish politician
- Iñaki Rupérez – Spanish footballer
- Iñaki Sáenz – Spanish footballer
- Iñaki Sáez – Spanish footballer
- Iñaki Salvador – Basque jazz and classical musician
- Iñaki Tejada – Spanish footballer and manager
- Iñaki Urdangarin – Spanish handballer and the former Duke of Palma de Mallorca
- Iñaki Urlezaga – Argentine ballet dancer
- Iñaki Vicente – Filipino footballer
- Iñaki Villanueva – Spanish rugby player
- Iñaki Williams – Spanish-born Ghanaian footballer
