= Dr. Ignatova =

Dr. Ignatova may refer to:

- Mihaela Ignatova, PhD, Bulgarian mathematician
- Ruja Ignatova, PhD, Bulgarian businesswoman and criminal

== See also ==
- Ignatov, a surname
