= 1956 Bulgarian Cup final =

- Event: 1956 Bulgarian Cup
Levski Sofia	Botev Plovdiv
5	2
- Date: 18 November 1956
- Venue: Vasil Levski National Stadium, Sofia
- Referee: Georgi Hristov (Sofia)
- Attendance: 40,000

The 1956 Bulgarian Cup final was the 16th final of the Bulgarian Cup (in this period the tournament was named Cup of the Soviet Army), and was contested between Levski Sofia and Botev Plovdiv on 18 November 1956 at Vasil Levski National Stadium in Sofia. Levski won the final 5–2.

== Match ==
=== Details ===
18 November 1956

Levski Sofia	5−2	Botev Plovdiv
Atanasov 18' (o.g.); Iliev 21', 69'; Yordanov 37'; Georgiev 77'		Karadaliev 24'; Sotirov 44'

Vasil Levski National Stadium, Sofia
Attendance: 40,000
Referee: Georgi Hristov (Sofia)

Levski	Botev

GK	1	(Bulgaria) Ivan Derventski
DF	2	(Bulgaria) Petar Donchev
DF	3	(Bulgaria) Blagoy Filipov
DF	4	(Bulgaria) Boris Apostolov
MF	5	(Bulgaria) Yoncho Arsov
MF	6	(Bulgaria) Tsvetan Tsvetanov
FW	7	(Bulgaria) Dimo Pechenikov
MF	8	(Bulgaria) Peyo Peev
FW	9	(Bulgaria) Dimitar Yordanov
FW	10	(Bulgaria) Ivan Georgiev
FW	11	(Bulgaria) Hristo Iliev (c)
Manager:
(Bulgaria) Georgi Pachedzhiev

GK	1	(Bulgaria) Georgi Kekemanov
DF	2	(Bulgaria) Rayno Panayotov
DF	3	(Bulgaria) Dimitar Raykov
DF	4	(Bulgaria) Ivan Atanasov
MF	5	(Bulgaria) Aleksandar Bahchevandzhiev (c)
MF	6	(Bulgaria) Ivan Delev
FW	7	(Bulgaria) Rangel Rangelov
MF	8	(Bulgaria) Ivan Zanev
FW	9	(Bulgaria) Ivan Sotirov
FW	10	(Bulgaria) Zhivko Karadaliev
FW	11	(Bulgaria) Angel Popangelov
Manager:
(Bulgaria) Georgi Genov

== See also ==
- 1956 A Group
