= Izan (name) =

- Gender: Male
- Language: Basque, Spanish

Other names
- See also: Ethan, Iñaki

Izan is a masculine given name of Spanish-language origin derived from 'Ethan' and 'Iñaki'.

The name "Izani" appears in a medieval registry in Valpuesta in the year 950, according to the Euskaltzaindia. Between 1922 and 2015, there were 33 people registered with the name Izan in Argentina. The name gained popularity in Spain the early 21st century. It was the 26th most common name for boys born in Spain in 2022, with 1,220.

As of 2023, it was the 102nd most common male name in Spain with 32,964 people named Izan in the country, including 5,039 in the Community of Madrid and 4,411 in the Province of Barcelona. The average age was 10.1 years old.

Notable people with the name include:

- Izan Almansa (born 2005), Spanish basketball player
- Izan Escarabajal (born 2004), Spanish karateka
- Izan Fernández (born 2001), Andorran footballer
- Izan González (born 2004), Spanish footballer
- Izan Guevara (born 2004), Spanish motorcycle racer
- Izan Llunas, Spanish actor and singer
- Izan Merino (born 2006), Spanish footballer
- Izan Yurrieta (born 2003), Spanish footballer

== See also ==
- Gumiel de Izán, municipality in Spain
- Izan is the permanent form of "to be" in the Basque language
  - Izan bainintzen Nafarroako errege, 2009 novel by Aingeru Epaltza
  - Izan Gira, 1975 song by Niko Etxart
  - Izan invictus, Basque reality television show
  - Izan zaitez zu, 2004 album by Kauta
