= Ignjatije =

Ignjatije (Serbian Cyrillic: Игњатије) is a Serbian masculine given name, a variant of the Latin name Ignatius, from ignis, "fire". The shortened form is Ignjat, while hypocorisms include Ignjac and Ignjo.

- Deacon Ignjatije, 14th-century Russian clergyman
- Ignjatije, Metropolitan of Dabar-Bosna (s. 1841–51)
- Ignjatije, 14th-century Bishop of Lipljan
- Ignjatije, Bishop of Raška and Prizren (s. 1840–49)
- Ignjatije Malobabić, 11th CK LKH member
- Ignjatije Midić, current Bishop of Braničevo

== See also ==
- Ignatije
- Ignjacije
