= Nacho (given name) =

Common short form of the Spanish name Ignacio

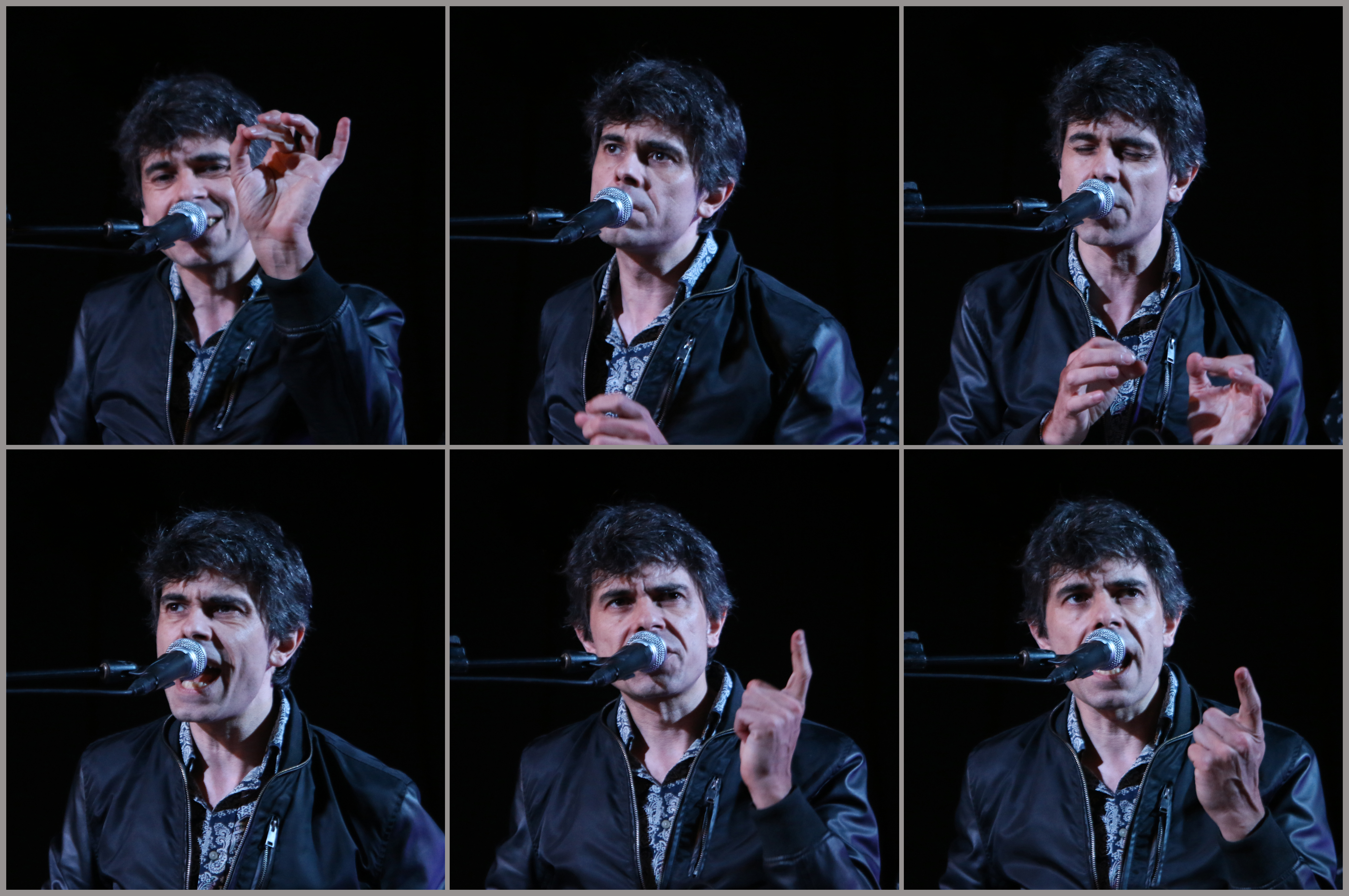
Spanish singer Nacho Camino (2016)

Nacho is the common short form of the Spanish name Ignacio. The feminine form is Nacha, for the given name Ignacia.

== Origin ==
Although there is no official record for it, it seems to be connected with the visit of Ignacio de Loyola to Rome in 1538 to get the Pope's approval for his foundation of the Company of Jesus. During his stay in Italy, the Italian pronunciation of his Spanish name, Ignacio, led to the form Nacho and remained as a familiar way to address people named Ignacio. Since then, Jesuits are commonly called "nachos".

== Film and television ==
- Nacho Barahona (born 1970), Spanish film editor
- Nacho Cerdà (born 1969), Spanish film director
- Nacho Galindo (actor) (1908-1973), Mexican-American actor
- Nacho Guerreros (born 1973), Spanish actor
- Nacho Martínez (1952–1996), Spanish actor
- Nacho Vidal (born 1973), Spanish pornographic actor
- Nacho Vigalondo (born 1977), Spanish filmmaker
- Nacho Varga, fictional character from Better Call Saul

== Music ==
- Nacho Cano (born 1963), Spanish arranger, composer, musician and record producer
- Nacho Canut (born 1957), Spanish bass player in the band Fangoria
- Nacho Chapado (born 1970), Spanish DJ and producer
- Nacho (singer) (born 1983), Venezuelan singer, songwriter and political activist
- Nacho Galindo (singer) (born 1959), Mexican singer for the group Conjunto Primavera
- Nacho Paredes (1935–2018), Colombian singer and songwriter
- Nacho Picasso (born 1983), American rapper

== Sports ==
=== Basketball ===
- Nacho Azofra (born 1969), Spanish basketball player
- Nacho Díez (born 1996), Spanish basketball player
- Nacho Martín (born 1983), Spanish basketball player
- Nacho Rodríguez (born 1970), Spanish basketball player
- Nacho Yáñez (born 1973), Spanish basketball player

=== Football ===
- Nacho (footballer, born 1955) (1955–2018), José Ignacio Pérez Frías, Spanish footballer
- Nacho (footballer, born 1967), José Ignacio Fernández Palacios, Spanish retired footballer
- Nacho (footballer, born 1980), Ignacio Pérez Santamaría, Spanish retired footballer
- Nacho (footballer, born 1989), José Ignacio Martínez García, Spanish footballer
- Nacho (footballer, born 1990), José Ignacio Fernández Iglesias, Spanish footballer
- Nacho (footballer, born 1993), Ignacio Agustín Sánchez Romo, Spanish footballer
- Nacho Casanova (born 1987), Spanish footballer
- Nacho Cases (born 1987), Spanish footballer
- Nacho Fernández (footballer, born 1980), Ignacio Fernández Rodríguez, Spanish footballer
- Nacho Fenrnández (footballer, born 1990), Ignacio Martín Fernández, Argentine footballer
- Nacho Garro (born 1981), Spanish footballer
- Nacho Miras (born 1997), Spanish footballer
- Nacho Monreal (born 1986), Spanish footballer
- Nacho Monsalve (born 1994), Spanish footballer
- Nacho Neira (born 1986), Spanish footballer
- Nacho Novo (born 1979), Spanish footballer
- Ronald García (born 1980), Bolivian footballer nicknamed "Nacho"
- Nacho González (footballer, born 1971), Ignacio Carlos González Cavallo, Argentine goalkeeper
- Nacho González (footballer, born 1982), Ignacio María González, Uruguayan midfielder
- Nacho Pérez (born 2008), Spanish footballer Nacho Pérez Gómez
- Ignacio Scocco (born 1985), Argentine footballer nicknamed "Nacho"

=== Other sports ===
- Nacho Albergamo, former All-American college football player
- Nacho Elvira (born 1987), Spanish golfer
- Nacho Figueras (born 1977), Argentine polo player and face of Ralph Lauren Polo fragrances

== Other fields ==
- Ignacio Anaya (c. 1894–1975), Mexican restaurateur credited as the creator of Nachos
- Nacho Duato (born 1957), Spanish classical ballet dancer and choreographer
- Nacho López (1923–1986), Mexican photojournalist
