= Valentin Ignatov =

Valentin Ignatov may refer to:

- Valentin Ignatov (surgeon) (born 1958), Bulgarian surgeon
- Valentin Ignatov (footballer) (born 1966), Bulgarian football player
