= Olawale Sulaiman =

Nigerian philanthropist, neurosurgeon

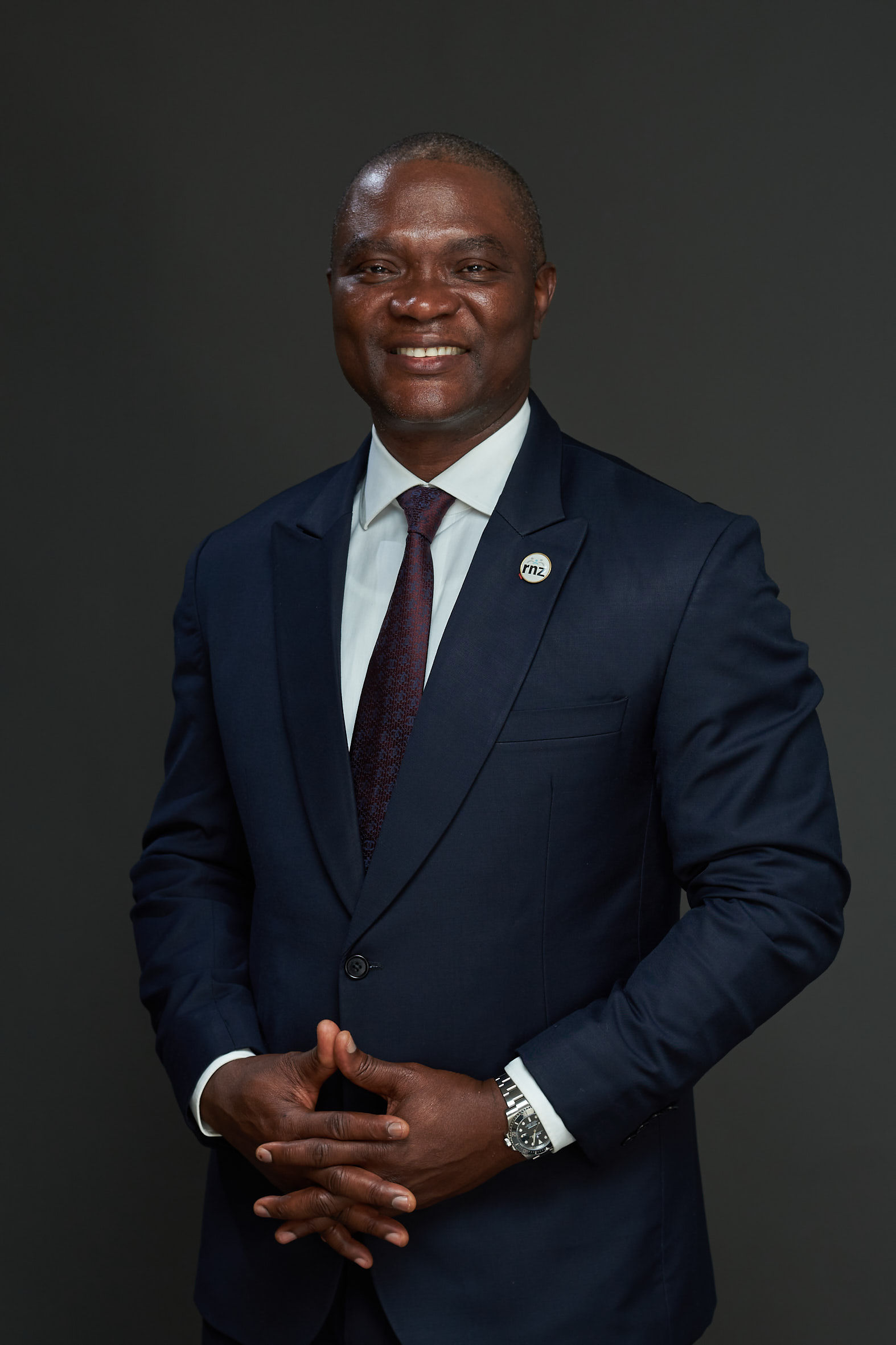
- Born: 1969/1970 (age 56–57); Lagos Island, Lagos, Nigeria
- Education: Medical University of Varna; University of Alberta
- Occupation: Neurosurgeon
- Spouse: Patricia
- Children: 3

Kwara State Special Adviser on Health Matters
- Incumbent
- Assumed office 26 August 2019
- Governor: AbdulRahman AbdulRazaq

Professor Olawale Sulaiman CON (born 1969/1970) is a Canadian and American-trained neurosurgeon, academician and physician executive of Nigerian heritage. He is the CEO and chief medical director of RNZ Global Ltd, a healthcare development, operations and management company he started in 2010. He is also the chief medical officer of RNZ Clinic.

== Education ==
The government of Nigeria awarded 19-year-old Sulaiman a scholarship to study medicine in Bulgaria, where he received both a Master of Science and Doctor of Medicine from the Medical University of Varna. The University of Alberta in Edmonton, Canada, awarded him a Doctor of Philosophy in neuroscience. His neurosurgery residency was completed at the University of Manitoba in Winnipeg, Manitoba.

Sulaiman received two postgraduate fellowships: a "complex nerve reconstruction" fellowship at Louisiana State University in New Orleans and a "complex spine surgery" fellowship at Medical College of Wisconsin in Milwaukee, Wisconsin.

== Career ==
He was system chairman of neurosurgery and co-medical director at the Ochsner Neuroscience Institute until January 2019 and then serves as the medical director, international medicine, African Region, Ochsner Health system. He was a professor of neurosurgery at Tulane University. Currently, a visiting professor at the University of Ilorin, Kwara State, and adjunct professor to University of Abuja. He is the CEO and chief medical director of RNZ Global Ltd, a healthcare development, operations and management company he started in 2010. On May 17, 2023, President Muhammadu Buhari appointed him as the Pro-Chancellor and Chairman Governing Council of the Federal University of Health Science, Ila-Orangun, Osun State.

On 26 August 2019, the governor of Kwara State, AbdulRahman AbdulRazaq, named Sulaiman as his "Special Adviser on Health Matters" to overhaul the state's healthcare system. The next month, from 23–27 September, Sulaiman participated in a Kwara State initiative that provided 26.9 million Nigerian naira (equivalent to US$104,229 in 2025) for 500 free surgeries at General Hospital Ilorin.

== Charity ==
While working as the Chairman of Neurosurgery at Ochsner Health System in New Orleans, USA, Sulaiman negotiated a reduction in his annual salary by 25% to free up time for him to travel to Nigeria every month to participate in education, training, and provision of medical care to Nigerians including free neurosurgery and spine care. Through his position in the USA, he has trained hundreds of medical students, resident Doctors and Fellows as well as facilitated the training of Nigerian Doctors at his hospital by providing scholarships. Furthermore, he has facilitated the involvement of prominent American healthcare companies in Nigeria by providing hands-on training and education to Neurosurgeons, Orthopedic Surgeons, and Resident Doctors. He has also been involved in countless medical missions where thousands of Nigerians benefited from free medical and surgical care. He also co-founded RNZ Foundation with his wife, Mrs. Patricia Sulaiman to provide free medical services for Nigerian patients and training for healthcare professionals.

== Personal life ==
Olawale Sulaiman was born in 1969 or 1970 in Lagos Island, Lagos, Nigeria; he later described being born into a poor polygamous family as one of ten children. Sulaiman later moved to Ajasse Ipo.

By March 2018, Sulaiman had three children. In October 2019, he was married to his wife Patricia and living in Louisiana.

He is married to Patricia, a nurse practitioner, and they have three children, Rahim, Zaynab, and Najeeb.

== Awards ==
He was shortlisted as one of the Sixty (60) most influential Nigerians, at "Your Views" Nigeria at 60th Diamond Jubilee series (Morayo,2020), in recognition of his selfless humanitarian services and career achievements home and abroad. Nigerians in Diaspora Commission (NIDCOM) also shortlisted him as one of the top +600 most prominent Nigerians at the 60th Independent anniversary. He was conferred the Distinguished Citizen Award in (2019) by the Nigerian Canadian Association of Calgary (NCAC) presented by Adeyinka Olatokunbo Asekun, the Nigerian ambassador to Canada. Recently, he was also awarded the rank of Commander of the Order of the Niger (CON) by President Muhammed Buhari.
