= Ignjatović =

- Pronunciation: [iɡɲǎːtoʋitɕ]

Origin
- Language: Serbian

Other names
- Variant form: Ignjatić

Ignjatović (Serbian Cyrillic: Игњатовић) is a Serbian surname, a patronymic derived from the masculine given name Ignjat. It may refer to:

- Aleksandar Ignjatović, Serbian footballer
- Jakov Ignjatović, Serbian writer
- Nevena Ignjatović, Serbian alpine skier
- Vera Ignjatovic, Serbian-born Australian haematologist and former handball player
