= Medical University of Varna =

Coordinates: 43°12′44″N 27°55′16″E

Medical University of Varna "Prof. Dr. Paraskev Stoyanov"
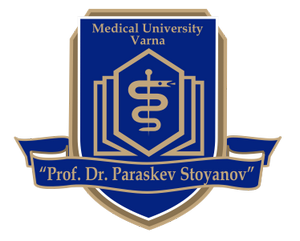
- Motto: Prosperitas vestra finis nostra.
- Motto in English: Your success is our goal!
- Type: Public
- Established: 1961
- Rector: Prof. Dimitar Raykov, MD, PhD
- Location: Varna, Bulgaria
- Website: http://www.mu-varna.bg

The Medical University of Varna (MU-Varna) is a Bulgarian state school for higher education dedicated to training specialists in the fields of medicine and healthcare who graduate with the educational and qualification degrees of Master, Bachelor and Professional Bachelor. The university has a legal entity status with the following scope of business activities: training of cadres and professional qualification; training of PhD students; postgraduate education for medical and non-medical cadres; conducting medical diagnosis, prevention, consultation, rehabilitation, and expert services at the university hospitals; scientific research and applied sciences; international cooperation in the field of education and science; administrative, social, sport, publishing, information, and other activities.

The Medical University of Varna is the first university in Bulgaria to implement the EFQM® model for Business Excellence of the European Foundation for Quality Management in 2008. The diplomas issued by the university are recognised in all the European Union countries.

MU-Varna possesses academic autonomy.

== History ==
=== Foundation ===
The university was founded as a higher medical institute by a Decree No. 414 from November 12, 1960, of the Presidium of the National Assembly of the Republic of Bulgaria and Order No. 208 from January 19, 1961, of the Ministry of Health. October 1, 1961 is considered its birthdate – the first school day of the first academic year at the first higher education medical school in Northeastern Bulgaria.

During the first 10 years all departments and basic clinics were developed. Facilities for education and scientific research were created. The main focus has been on the continuous improvement of the practical training. With the growth of the institute, the construction of new hospital premises was organised both for educational purposes and for the healthcare needs in Northeastern Bulgaria. During the 1970s the new Surgery Clinic and the Dermatology Clinic were built. In the 1980s the Obstetrics and Gynecology Hospital, the Psychiatric Hospital (the largest on the Balkan Peninsula), the Eye Hospital, the Therapeutic Hospital (the current University Hospital "St. Marina" – Varna) were also established.

In 1995, by a decree of the National Assembly, the Higher Medical Institute of Varna was renamed to Medical University of Varna. In 2002 the university accepted as its name the name of its patron – Prof. Dr. Paraskev Stoyanov. The university auditoria are traditionally named after prominent professors from the Medical University of Varna.

The Medical University of Varna is among the first members of the Black Sea Universities Network (BSUN) and is full member of the European University Association (EUA). From 2006 the graduating doctors receive a European supplement to their diplomas which is valid for their professional realisation in the EU countries.

Since the beginning of the 21st century, with the opening of new faculties and programmes, high-tech laboratories, research centres, creation of more conditions for scientific exchange, work on programmes, active international cooperation, scientific periodicals, better online presence and work in the new digital environment, university TV, MU-Varna has expanded its educational scope and has developed further its academic potential.

=== Symbols, awards and honours ===
The university tries to satisfy the public need of high-quality medical and management cadres in healthcare and the social field in accordance with the national strategies for the development of education and healthcare, and the international standards. It aims to develop fundamental and applied scientific research, innovations and new technologies, as well as to improve the national health in partnership with the other parts of the healthcare system. The university aims to be a nationally recognised leader in the academic education and scientific research which have a considerable contribution to the improvement of the nation's health, the technological progress and the quality of life.

- Coat of Arms represents a stylized image of an open book in the Temple of Knowledge and in its centre - the symbol of medicine – a staff with a snake wound around it.
- Flag is manufactured from white silk and goldthread. In accordance with the heraldic tradition, the coat of arms and the name of the institution, Medical University "Prof. Dr. Paraskev Stoyanov", are embroidered in blue on the white background. The Flag is kept in the Assembly Room at the Rectorate Building.
- Rector's Ceremonial Mace is crowned with two spheres, one inscribed into the other with a snake in the centre, which symbolises medical knowledge. It originates from the ancient symbol of medicine – a staff with a snake wound around it as well as from the ancient tales of the snake's wisdom and omniscience. A jade sphere is placed on the top end of the mace – a symbol of eternity, strength and knowledge, the essential values of medicine.
- Rector's Necklace has a round shape which symbolises the infinity of scientific knowledge. The pendant is entirely made of bronze. The coat of arms of the university is engraved in the centre of the pendant – an open book in the Temple of Knowledge and as its centre – the symbol of medicine – a staff with a snake wound around it. The base of the pendant is made of blue stone which symbolises the human ideals.
- Rector's Toga is red with black lining.
- Dean's Toga is dark blue with red lining. The symbols are carried during University holidays, ceremonial processions and ceremonial sessions of the Academic Council.
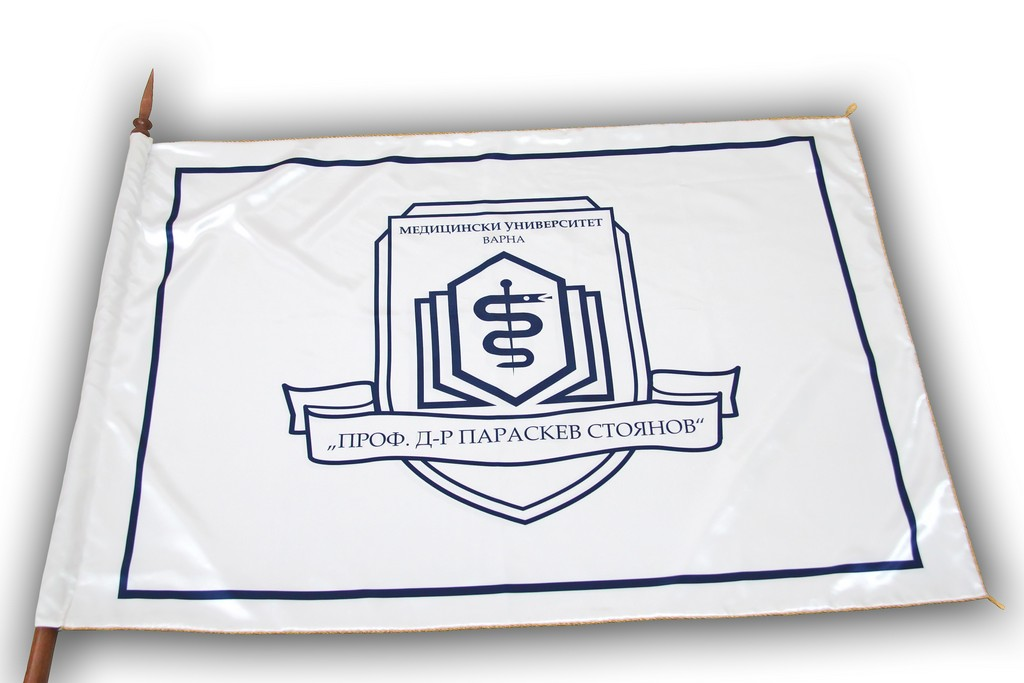
The Flag of Mu-Varna

Awards and Honours

By a decree of the Academic Council of MU-Varna the following awards for high achievements in teaching and scientific research as well as for long-term successful work at the university are given:

- Honorary title "Doctor Honoris Causa" of the Medical University of Varna: For exceptional achievements in the development of the university and Bulgarian healthcare.
- Academic Honours: Honorary star with a blue ribbon. Honorary sign with a blue ribbon.
- Honorary Diploma: Golden Hippocrates – awarded by the Rector for excellent results to University graduates.
- Honours: Honorary plaque. Honorary sign. Plaque "SIGNUM LAUDIS" (for contribution to the scientific research and academic development of professors from MU-Varna and other Bulgarian universities).

=== Patron ===
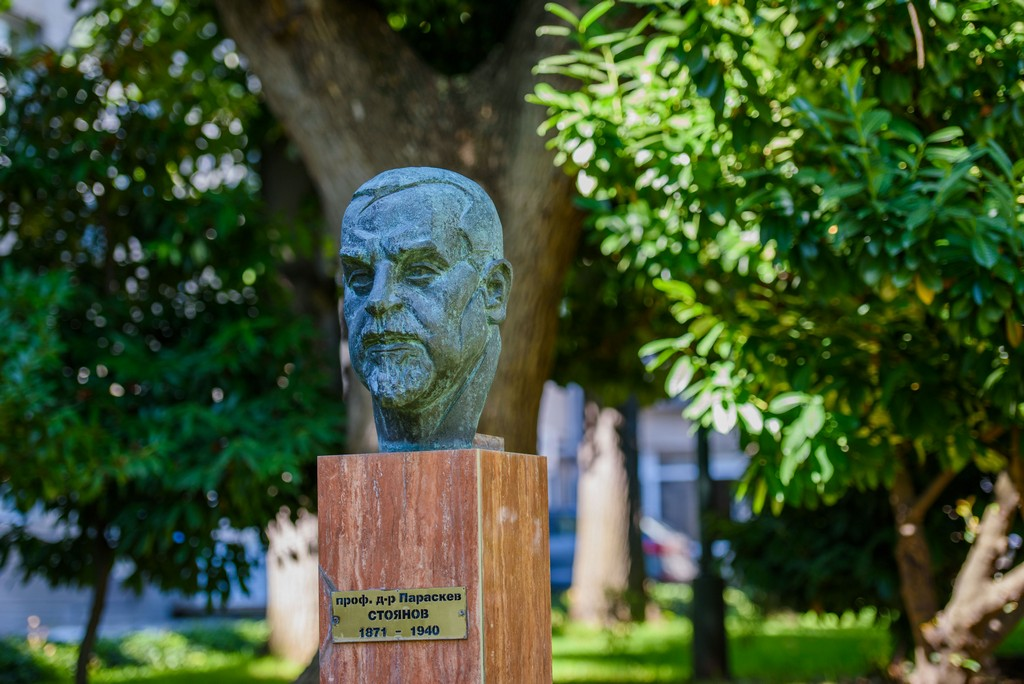

The Monument of Paraskev Stoyanov in the Yard of MU-Varna

The Medical University of Varna carries the name of Prof. Dr. Paraskev Stoyanov famous for his pioneer and enlightening role not only in Bulgarian medicine and science. He established the first Bulgarian school of surgery, started the training in anatomy in Bulgaria, gave the first lecture in medicine in Bulgaria (1918), opened, in the Varna region, the only one on the Balkan Peninsula, Children's Sea Sanatorium for Bone and Joint Tuberculosis. He was the first in the country who produced X-ray images, performed a complex surgery of a damaged heart and is the first Bulgarian hiker (1895, the peak of Grand Combin, Switzerland). At international level, Prof. Stoyanov, is recognised as one of the founders of thalassotherapy (treatment with sea water) and heliotherapy (treatment with sun). He is an author of scientific and general publications as well as literary memoirs

=== Rectors ===
- Dimitar Raykov (2024 - until now)
- Svetoslav Georgiev (June 2023 - 2024)
- Valentin Ignatov (2020 – June 2023)
- Krasimir Ivanov (2012–2020)
- Anelia Klisarova (2004–2012)
- Temelko Temelkov (1999–2004)
- Dimitar Kamburov (1990–1999)
- Georgi Marinov (1987–1990)
- Vanko Vankov (1983–1987)
- Garabed Kaprelyan (1977–1983)
- Raycho Koinov (1973–1977)
- Vladimir Ivanov (1966–1973)
- Zdravka Kemileva (1963–1966)
- Gergo Mitov (1962–1963)
- Radan Radanov (1961–1962)

== Campus ==
=== Faculties and college ===
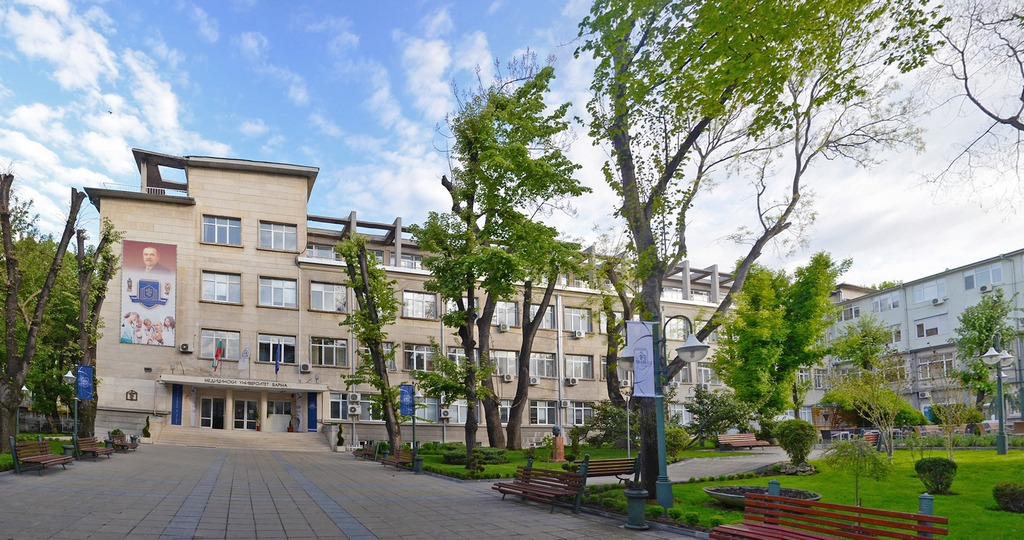
Rectorate Building

Faculty of Medicine is a main part of the university structure uniting 20 departments and 18 teaching and research sectors. Its purpose is to train staff with a higher education degree in medicine, graduating with educational qualification degree Master and professional qualification Master in Medicine. It is an educational institution for PhD students and it offers postgraduate education in a wide variety of majors. The education process is only full-time and it is conducted following a curriculum developed according to the state requirements for the major. The duration of the course is 6 years.

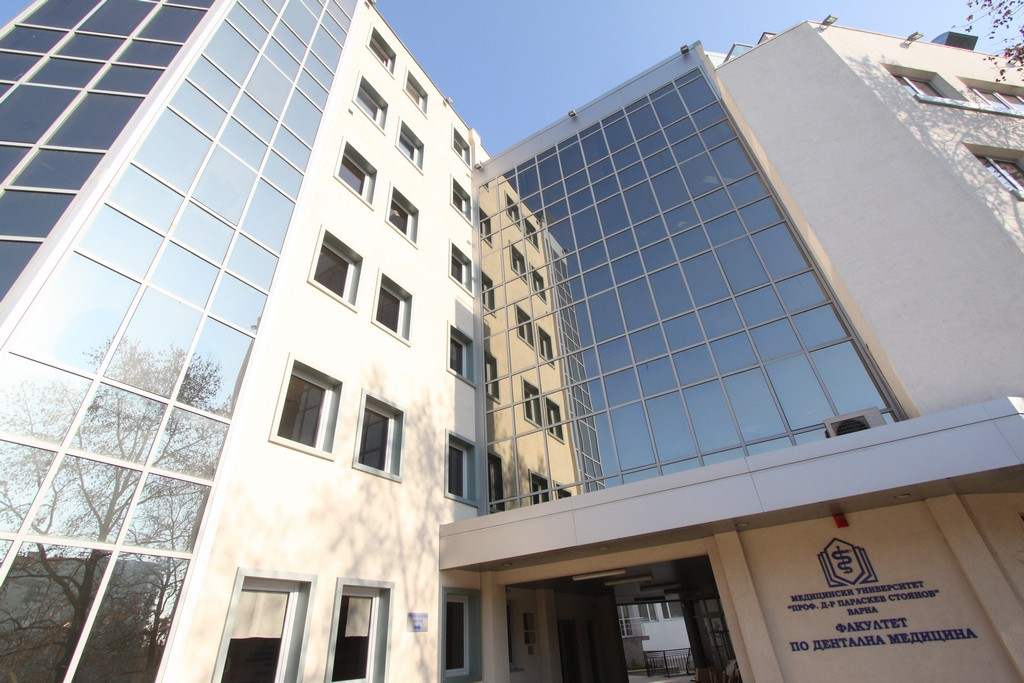
Faculty of Dental Medicine

Faculty of Dental Medicine was founded on March 15, 2006, and it comprises 7 departments. It is dedicated to the training of professionals with a higher education degree in dental medicine, interns and PhD students in the main dental medicine majors. Since 2008 the faculty has had at its disposal a new building equipped for the purposes of the students’ theoretical and practical training. In 2009, as a part of the faculty, a new Academic Centre of Implantology was opened. The educational process is only full-time and it is conducted in three stages (6 years).

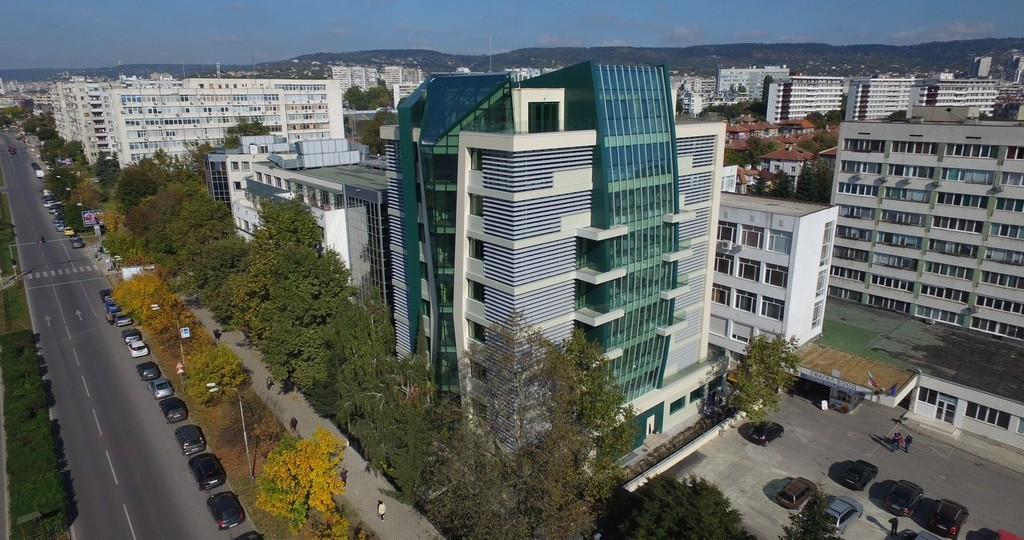
Faculty of Pharmacy

Faculty of Pharmacy was founded on October 16, 2008, and consists of 8 departments. At the faculty, which, by 2016, is the only one in Eastern Bulgaria, pharmacy students, interns and PhD students are trained in the main pharmaceutical disciplines. The educational process is only full-time with a duration of 5 years and includes a 6-month pre-graduation internship.

Faculty of Public Health was founded on June 20, 2001, and it has 6 departments. It trains specialists with a higher education in the programmes of Health Management, Public Health, Healthcare Management, Nurse, Midwife, Pharmaceutical Management, and Rehabilitation, Thalassotherapy, Wellness and Spa. It offers 10 accredited PhD programmes, postgraduate training in the form of continuous educational courses as well as individual courses for postgraduate qualification including online courses. It is a member of the Association of Schools of Public Health in the European Region (ASPHER) and the "Public Health in Southeastern Europe" network (PH-SEE) as well as a member of the National Global Health Network.

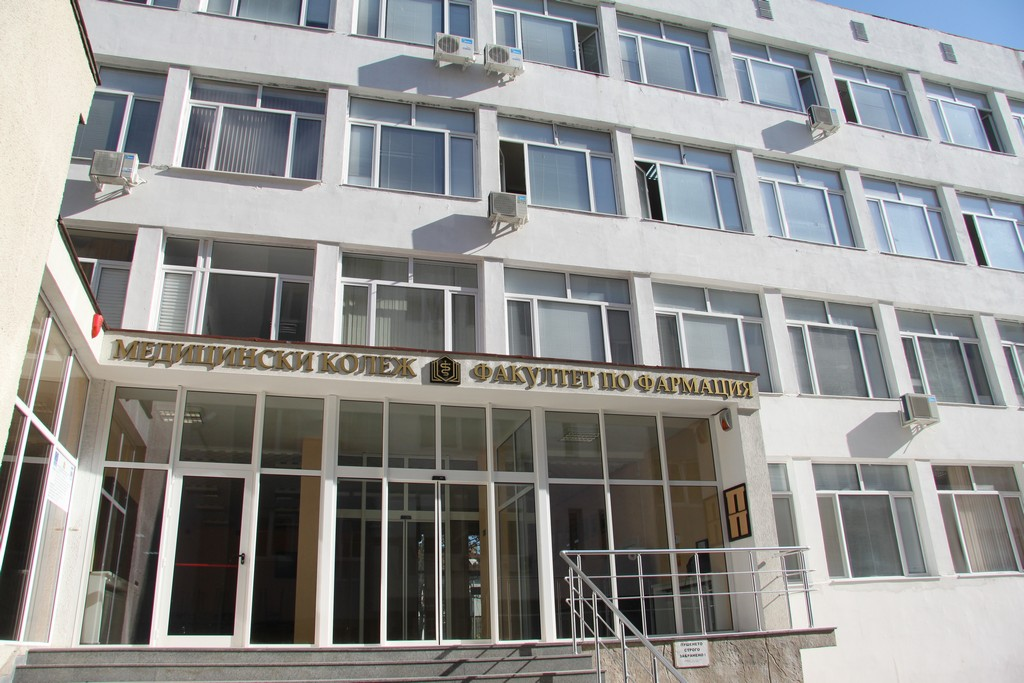
Medical College

Medical College is the structure with the oldest history and traditions. It was founded in 1942 as a Nursing School, from 1944 until 1997 the college underwent numerous transformations: Institute for Nurses, School for Midwives, United Medical School, Medical Institute. Since 1997 it has been a main part of the structure of the Medical University of Varna. It offers training for a Professional Bachelor in the following programmes: Assistant Pharmacist, Medical Laboratory Technician, X-ray laboratory assistant, Dental Technician, Public Health Inspector, Physiotherapist, Social Activities, Medical Beautician, Medical Optician, as well as training aimed at continuing the qualification of those who have acquired medical or non-medical degree.

=== Affiliates and departments ===
Affiliates in Sliven, Shumen, Veliko Tarnovo. Established after a Decision of the National Assembly from 2013 and 2015. The affiliates offer training in the programmes "Nursing" and "Midwifery". A full-time educational course. An education qualification degree of bachelor, the duration of the course is 4 years and the last year is pre-graduation internship. The lecture course of the training can be found online. The students have the opportunity to listen to their professors’ lectures in real time thanks to videoconferencing with the university in Varna.

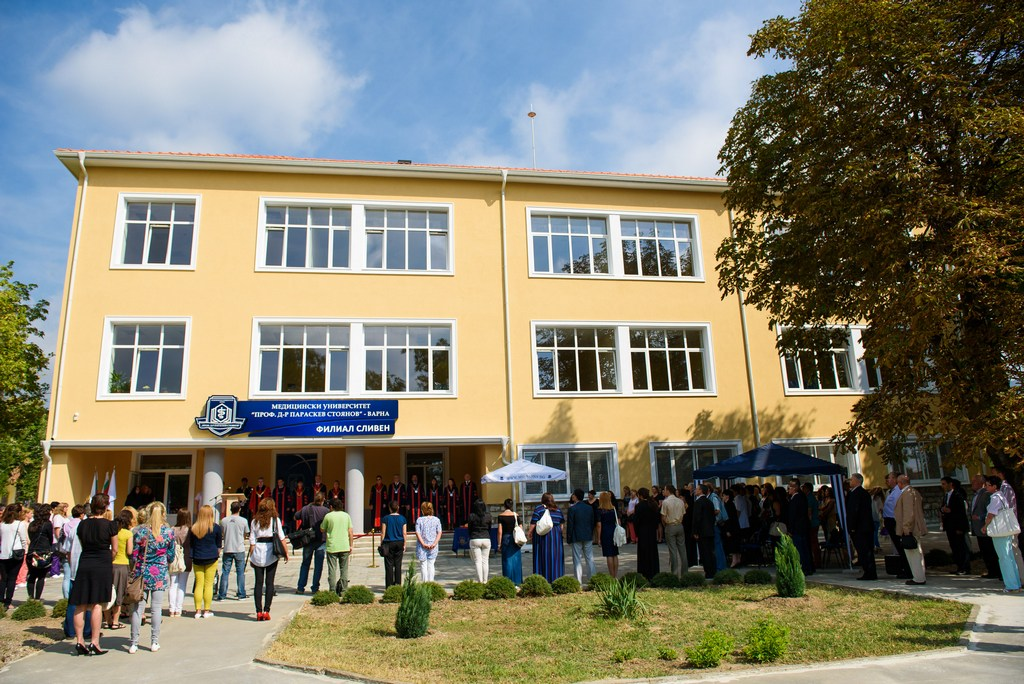
Affiliate in Sliven

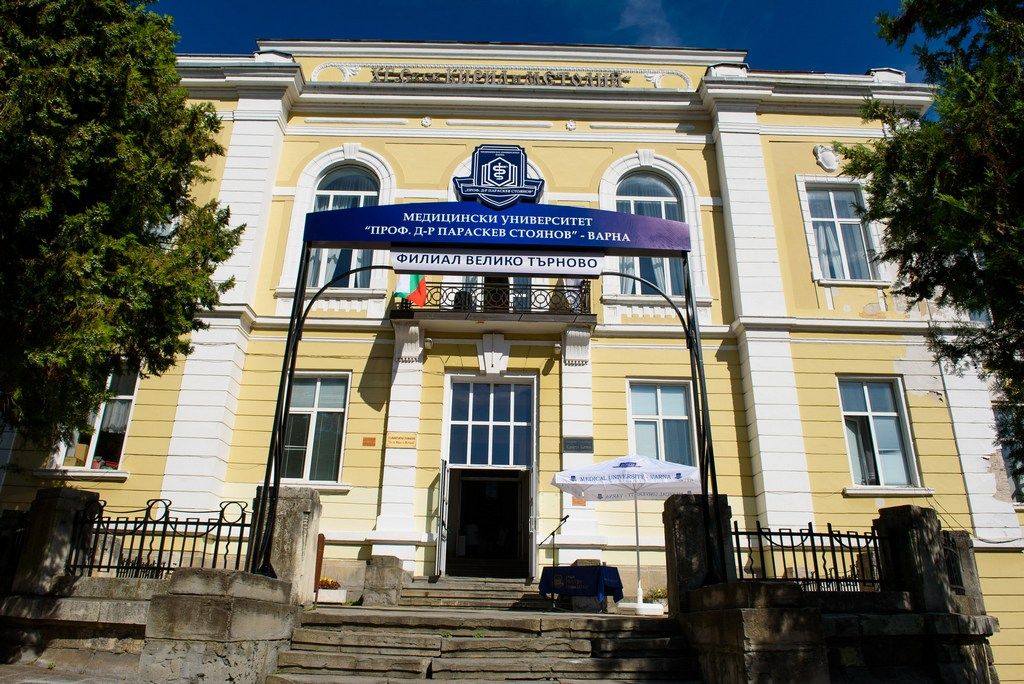
Affiliate in Veliko Tarnovo

Department of Foreign Language Teaching, Communications and Sport (DFLTCS) is a successor of the Department of Foreign Languages founded in 1962. It provides language teaching in Medical Latin, Bulgarian, English, German and French languages, to the students from the four faculties and the Medical College. The department offers also a preparatory one-year course in Bulgarian and English to the foreign students.

== Organisation and administration ==
The Management bodies at the Medical University of Varna are the following: the General Assembly, the Academic Council, and the Rector. The General Assembly is composed of all professors, representatives of the teaching assistants, the students and the administrative personnel. The Academic Council consists of 25 to 45 people and includes members of the academic staff, representatives of the PhD students, the students and the personnel. The professors comprise no less than 70% of the total number and the representatives of the students and the PhD students - 15%. Academic staff who meet the requirements of the Regulations of the Medical University of Varna are elected for the positions of Rector and Vice Rectors. The Rector works together with the counselling organ the Rector's Council. Bodies of coordination and control at the Medical University of Varna are also the Control Council, the Council of Trustees and the Central Commission for Quality Management.

== International activities ==
The Medical University of Varna maintains partnerships with over 80 universities and educational institutions from more than 40 countries on 5 continents.

- The partnerships are based on bilateral agreements for academic cooperation in the field of training and scientific research. Joint projects are implemented with leading universities and university hospitals in Germany, Austria, Belgium, Italy, the Netherlands, Switzerland and almost all member countries of the European Union and European Educational Area. Outside the EU, the university maintains academic cooperation with educational institutions in Russia (Moscow, St. Petersburg, Pensa, Kursk) and Ukraine (Bogomolets State Medical University in Kyiv and the University of Pharmacy in Kharkov). An active practical exchange is carried out with universities and university hospitals in Turkey (Edirne) and Israel (Haifa, Jerusalem and Tel Aviv).
- Since 2010, an exchange has been carried out on the clinical facilities of MU-Varna for students’ summer practices with First Moscow State Medical University “I. M. Sechenov” and Northwestern State Medical University “I. I. Mechnikov” in St. Petersburg. The Department of International Relations is also responsible for the organization of academic staff mobility. The guest professors come from the universities of Seged, Kharkov, Vienna, Zagreb, Silesia, etc. The international exchange includes clinical internships, PhD programmes (“Ovidius” University in Constanta, Romania) and specializations.
- From 2001 to 2007 MU-Varna organised an exchange of students and academic staff within “Socrates-Erasmus” Programme. In 2007 MU-Varna obtained an extended Erasmus University Charter and carried out students’ and academic staff exchange within the Lifelong Learning Programme for the period 2007–2013. Since December 2013 the university has been awarded “Erasmus+” University Charter for the new programme period 2014–2020. MU-Varna has signed bilateral agreements within “Erasmus+” Programme with 32 universities from 15 European countries.
- Some of the significant international projects are in the field of cardiology and cardiosurgery (Augsburg, Germany; Pensa, Russia), surgery (Hannover, Germany; Pittsburgh, USA), paediatric oncohaematology (Bonn, Germany), cancer research (Heidelberg, Germany), dermatology (Moscow) and transplantation (Germany, Israel).

== Academics ==
=== Programmes ===
At the faculties of medicine, dental medicine, pharmacy, public health of the Medical University of Varna and the Medical College the following programmes are offered: Medicine, Dental Medicine, Pharmacy, Nurse, Midwife, Health Management, Healthcare Management, Public Health, Medical Laboratory Assistant, Radiographer, Assistant Pharmacist, Dental Technician, Public Health Inspector, Physiotherapist, Medical Beautician, Medical Optician, Pharmaceutical Management, Rehabilitation, Thalassotherapy, Wellness and Spa, Public Health Prevention and Control (In Bulgarian), Public Health and Health Management (in Russian).

At the affiliates in Sliven, Shumen and Veliko Tarnovo: Nursing, Midwifery.

English language programmes are offered in: Medicine, Dental Medicine, Public Health.

=== Admission ===
The admission process of the Medical University of Varna consists of preliminary and routine exams - in Varna as well as in Sliven, Veliko Tarnovo, Shumen, Germany, Austria, Great Britain, Spain.

As a part of its admission campaign the Medical University of Varna offers preparatory courses and admission consultations: comprehensive and short intensive preparatory courses in biology, chemistry, modelling; some of them also available in different cities in Bulgaria and several EU countries. There is a new online question form, as well as online submission of application papers and the placement of all applicants from all programmes.

There are specialised websites dedicated to the admission campaign – in Bulgarian, English and German.

“Open Door Days” are organised for Bulgarian and foreign applicants. The university participates in educational fairs and international exhibitions in order to increase the enrollment of foreign students, after a preliminary analysis of the scope and the perspectives for the Medical University of Varna.

=== Vocational Training and Postgraduate Studies ===
- Centre for Vocational Training
- Department of Postgraduate Education
- Centre for Online Education
- Centre for Career Development

=== PhD Programmes ===
Medical University of Varna offers training in 54 accredited PhD programmes in the following eight professional directions: 1) Medicine; 2) Dental Medicine; 3) Chemical Sciences; 4) Life Sciences; 5) Psychology; 6) Administration and Management; 7) Pharmacy; 8) Public Health.

=== State-of-the-Art Method of Teaching ===
In 2014 the Medical University of Varna incorporated a platform complementing the online education of the students from all programmes. In their personal profile the students receive interactive handbooks, exercises, video lectures, 3D atlases, tests, etc. They can also check their grades. In 2014 a new technology came into use, which allows the current evaluation of the level of mastering of the material and facilitates the interactive method of education. The students have the opportunity to study human anatomy by means of interactive methods and 3D technology

=== Training facilities ===
The university has training facilities for training of students, PhD students and interns at UMHAT “St. Marina” - Varna, MHAT “St. Anna”, the Specialized Hospital of Obstetrics and Gynecology for Active Treatment “Prof. Dr. D. Stamatov” - Varna, the Specialized Eye Hospital for Active Treatment - Varna, the Faculty of Dental Medicine, the Faculty of Pharmacy, RHI (Regional Health Inspection) and the Medical College of Varna. The University Hospital “St. Marina” - Varna has several lecture halls for practical and theoretical activities. The students use the digital library - part of the digitized and centralized library system of the university. The hospital is in possession of highly specialised equipment as well as the most current apparatuses such as gamma camera, magnetic resonance imaging, PET CT with a cyclotron, CT Dual-Source.

== Students' life ==
=== Profile ===
The students are trained in programs predominantly in Bulgarian and also in English. Among the international students, the largest number come from Germany (the largest group, over 40% of all foreign students), The Kingdom of Bahrain, The United Kingdom, Greece, Cyprus, Sweden, Spain, Turkey, USA, Norway, Portugal, Ireland, Austria, Albania, North Macedonia, Ukraine, Finland, Denmark, Serbia, Italy, France, Poland, Belgium, Switzerland, The Netherlands, Israel, Iran, Yemen, Egypt, Kuwait, Brazil, Japan, Tunisia, The Dominican Republic, India, Russia, Kazakhstan, Luxembourg, Bhutan, Azerbaijan, Syria, Nigeria.

=== Students' council ===
The council is a body dedicated to the defense of the students' general interests a representing the students and the PhD students of the Medical University of Varna in the General Assembly. The term of the students and the PhD students in the General Assembly is with a duration of two years with the right to be re-elected for another term. The Student Council elects a chairman among its members, who organises and manages its activity as well as represents it in front of the managing authorities of the university.

=== Sport ===
Every year the students of the Medical University of Varna take part in the traditional sport tournaments “Varna Universiade”, “The Cup of the Rector”, “Summer University” and “Winter Universiade”. They compete in different disciplines among themselves and with students from other universities from the city and the country. Physical Education is a mandatory form of education for all the students from the initial years of all programmes. The university athletes and the teams conduct their training sessions under the guidance of professional trainers.

== Notable alumni ==
- Aneliya Klisarova, medical scientist and professor.
- George Chaldakov, vascular biologist and neurobiologist.
- Krasimir Ivanov, surgeon, oncologist, professor and rector.
- Milen Vrabevski, businessman and philanthropist.
- Olawale Sulaiman, neurosurgeon and academic.
- Iliyan Ivanov, psychiatrist, professor.

== Library, Publishing and TV ==
Library

The library of the Medical University of Varna was founded in 1961. The library possesses around 160 000 volumes of books and periodicals. In the library fund there are also around 500 old books on medicine, pharmacology and dental medicine, printed in the period 1830–1950. A digital catalogue was created and has been maintained since 1995.

Publishing Department

The main functions of the Publishing Department are the processing and publishing of scientific print production of the university (textbooks, handbooks and monographs, reference books and manuals, dissertations, proceedings, editions and printed materials for the needs of the scientific activities). The online bookstore processes orders in Bulgaria as well as at an international level.

Scientific Periodicals of the Medical University of Varna

Scientific journals of the university in English:

- Scripta Scientifica Medica (published since 1962). The first official scientific periodical of the Medical University of Varna. Dedicated to scientific articles in the field of medicine.
- Scripta Scientifica Pharmaceutica (since 2014). For scientific articles in the field of pharmacy.
- Scripta Scientifica Medicinae Dentalis (since 2015). Dedicated to scientific articles in the field of dental medicine.
- Scripta Scientifica Salutis Publicae (since 2015). For scientific articles in the field of public health.

All journals are with an open access to authors from all over the world. From 2014 national and international authors can submit articles via the online publishing platform. The articles receive a DOI number.

Television MU-Vi.tv

MU-Vi.tv is the educational television of the Medical University of Varna with a specialized programme profile in medicine and healthcare in two main directions - an educational programme for specialists in the fields of medicine, dental medicine, pharmacy and public health and an educational health programme for the general public. The programme strategy includes lectures by Bulgarian and foreign specialists, filmed surgeries, manipulations and rehabilitation activities, etc.

The Television has a national coverage and is broadcast via cable as well as via a satellite network. MU-Vi.tv is registered by the Digital Media Council with an initial broadcast date of March 1, 2015.

== University Centres and Museums ==
- Academic Clinical Research Organization (ACRO)
- University Medico-Dental Centre
- Centre for Translational Medicine and Cell Therapy
- School for PhD Students
- Vivarium
- University Centre for Eastern Medicine
- Museum of History of Medicine

== See also ==
- Balkan Universities Network
- University Hospital St. Marina - Varna
- George Chaldakov, MD, PhD - Scientist and Professor
- List of medical schools
- Varna
