= Żegota (disambiguation) =

- Żegota was a Polish World War II resistance organization founded by the Armia Krajowa to help the Jews during the Holocaust.

Żegota may also refer to:

- Żegota, a Polish male name of Slavic origin; its Christian counterpart is the name of Ignatius
- Żegota, nom de guerre of two Polish 20th century generals: Marian Żegota-Januszajtis and Tadeusz Kurcyusz
- Żegota, a punk rock band that emerged as part of the CrimethInc. movement in the late 1990s
