= George Chaldakov =

- George Chaldakov in 2006
- Born: George Nikov Chaldakov; 23 February 1940 (age 86); Burgas, Bulgaria
- Citizenship: Bulgaria
- Education: Medical University of Varna (M.D.)(Ph.D.)
- Known for: Homo obesus
- Awards: Iuliu Hațieganu University of Medicine and Pharmacy (Doctor Honoris Causa)
- Scientific career
- Fields: Vascular Biology; Adipobiology; Neurobiology
- Workplaces: Medical University of Varna

George Nikov Chaldakov (Bulgarian: Георги Ников Чалдъков) born February 23, 1940, in Burgas, Bulgaria, is a Bulgarian vascular biologist well known for his contributions to the study of secretory function of vascular smooth muscle cells, and the role of neurotrophins and perivascular adipose tissue in pathogenesis of atherosclerosis. He published the first Bulgarian textbook of Cell Biology in 1996 and in 2005 founded the Bulgarian Society for Cell Biology.

In 1966 Chaldakov graduated as an MD from Varna Institute of Medicine (since 1991, named Medical University of Varna), Varna, Bulgaria. In 1983 he obtained a PhD in Vascular Biology, "Ultrastructural and cytopharmacological study of aging in vascular smooth muscle cells, with special reference to their secretory function". Since 2007, Chaldakov has served as Professor Emeritus at Medical University of Varna, Bulgaria.

For the past 30 years Chaldakov has been involved in interdisciplinary research in the fields of vascular biology, and has had relationship with suchadipobiology, and neurobiology and is one of the pioneers establishing the novel concept of the secretory function/phenotype of the vascular smooth muscle cells and further delineating their role in atherogenesis. Chaldakov developed a complex tripartite model of atherogenesis which involve smooth muscle cells, immune cells, and perivascular adipose tissue communicating through secreted factors (e.g. neurotrophins, adipokines, cytokines).

In 1991, Chaldakov became founder and chief editor of Biomedical Reviews, An International Journal of Cell Biology of Disease. He has also been an organizer of Biomedical Forum, Annual Program of Continuing Medical Education held at Medical University of Varna, Bulgaria.

== Innovations and substantial contributions to science ==
- Concept of the secretory function/phenotype of the vascular smooth muscle cell, as related to atherogenesis.
- Tubulin/microtubule-targeted pharmacology for atherosclerosis.
- Concept of the neurotrophins NGF and BDNF as metabotrophic factors (metabotrophins) in cardiometabolic biology/diseases.
- Conceptualize the protein secretory products of adipose tissue cells as adipokines, also focusing on perivascular adipose tissue.
- Conceptualize studying adipose tissue-directed pharmacology as adipopharmacology.
- In 2006 introduced the term Homo obesus and is actively involved in popularizing the need of healthy lifestyle and dietary restriction: millions of people suffer and die from starvation in ill-developed and poor countries while in Western world and Europe people get overweight and die as a result of strokes or heart infarctions.
