= Ignacio Rodríguez =

Ignacio or Nacho Rodríguez may refer to:

- Ignacio Rodríguez Galván (1816–1842), Mexican romantic writer
- Ignacio Rodríguez Iturbe (1942–2022), Venezuelan hydrologist
- Ignacio Rodríguez (basketball) (born 1970), Spanish basketball player
- Ignacio Rodríguez (footballer, born 1956) (1956–2025), Mexican footballer
- Ignacio Rodríguez (footballer, born 2004), Argentine footballer
- Ignacio Rodríguez (footballer, born 2002), Argentine footballer
- Nacho Rodríguez (Spanish footballer) (born 1982), Spanish footballer
- Juan Ignacio Rodríguez (born 1992), Spanish archer
- Ignacio Rodríguez (field hockey) (born 1996), Spanish field hockey player
- Ignacio Rodríguez (programmer) (born 1999), Uruguayan programmer
- Nacho Rodríguez (Uruguayan footballer), Uruguayan football centre-back
