= Ignazio =

Ignazio (Italian pronunciation: [iɲˈɲattsjo]) is a masculine Italian given name. Notable people with the name include:

== Arts ==
- Ignazio Collino (1736–1793), Italian sculptor
- Ignazio Gardella (1905–1999), Italian architect and designer
- Ignazio Hugford (1703–1777), Italian painter
- Ignazio Marabitti (1719–1797), Sicilian sculptor
- Ignazio Oliva (17th century), Italian painter
- Carlo Ignazio Pozzi (1786–1842), Italian painter and architect
- Ignazio Stern (1679–1748), Austrian painter

== Literature ==
- Ignazio Buttitta (1899–1997), Sicilian dialectal poet
- Ignazio Giorgi (1675–1737), Italian poet and translator
- Ignazio Lomellini (1560–1645), Jesuit priest from Genoa
- Ignazio Silone (1900–1978), Italian novelist and poet

== Music ==
- Ignazio Albertini (1644–1685), Italian violinist and composer
- Ignazio Cirri (1711–1787), Italian organist and composer
- Ignazio Boschetto, Italian singer-songwriter & member of Il Volo
- Ignazio Donati (1570–1638), Italian composer
- Ignazio Fiorillo (1715–1787), Italian composer
- Ignazio Marini (1811–1873), Italian operatic bass
- Carlo Ignazio Monza (1680–1739), Italian composer
- Ignazio Pollice (1684–1705), Sicilian composer
- Ignazio Prota (1690–1748), Italian composer

== Politics ==
- Ignazio Calvi (1797–1872), Italian patriot and chess player
- Ignazio Cassis (born 1961), Swiss physician and politician
- Paolo Ignazio Maria Thaon di Revel (1888–1973), Italian politician
- Ignazio La Russa (born 1947), Italian politician
- Ignazio Marino (born 1955), Italian surgeon and politician

== Religion ==
- Ignazio Arnoz (1885–1950), Czech prelate
- Ignazio Bedini (born 1939), Italian archbishop
- Ignazio Busca (1731–1803), Italian cardinal
- Ignazio Cannavò (born 1921), Italian archbishop
- Ignazio Persico (1823–1896), Italian cardinal

== Sports ==
- Ignazio Abate (born 1986), Italian professional footballer
- Ignazio Arcoleo (born 1948), Italian footballer and manager
- Ignazio Belluardo (born 1986), Italian racing driver
- Ignazio Fabra (1930–2008), Italian wrestler
- Ignazio Giunti (1941–1971), Italian racing driver

== Others ==
- Ignazio Cardini (1566–1602), Corsican doctor and humanist
- Ignazio Cerio (1841–1921), Italian physician and philosopher
- Ignazio Danti (1536–1586), Italian mathematician and astronomer
- Johnny Dio (1914–1979), Italian-American gangster
- Ignazio Guidi (1844–1935), Italian orientalist
- Ignazio Leone (1923–1976), Italian film actor
- Ignazio Lupo (1877–1947), Sicilian-American gangster
- Giovanni Ignazio Molina (1740–1829), Chilean naturalist and historian
- Ignazio Porro (1801–1875), Italian optician
- Ignazio Salvo (1932–1992), Italian businessman
- Ignazio Visco (born 1949), Italian economist
- Ignazio Vella (1928–2011), American businessman
- Prince Sixtus of Bourbon-Parma (1886–1934), Italian nobleman
- Prince Gabriel of Bourbon-Two Sicilies (1897–1975), Italian nobleman

== See also ==
- Ignjat
- Ignacio
- Ignatius
- Inácio
- Inigo
