= Iliyan Ivanov =

Bulgarian American psychiatrist

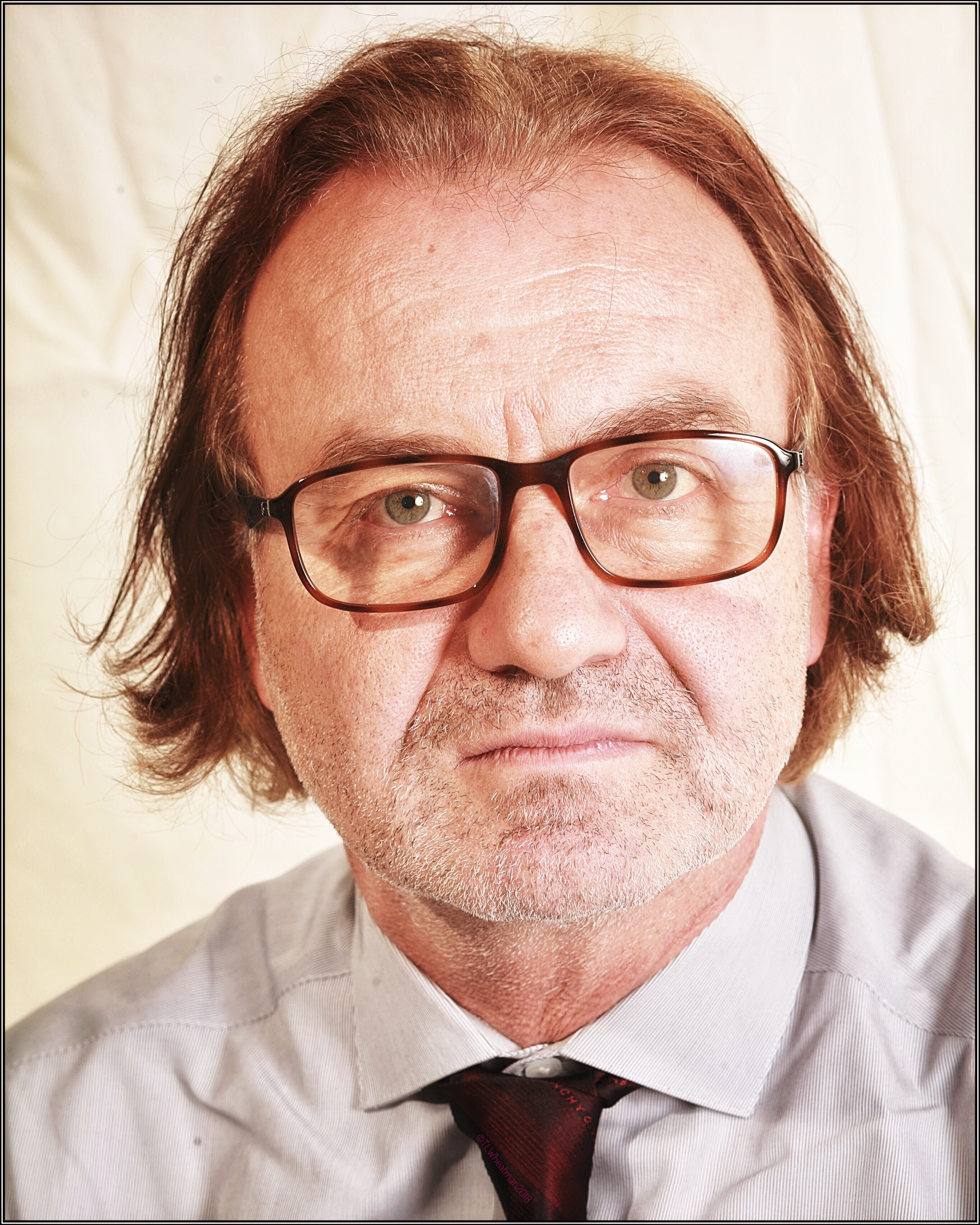
- Born: 18 July 1963 (age 62); Burgas, Bulgaria
- Education: Medical University of Varna
- Years active: 1996 - currently
- Medical career
- Profession: Psychiatrist
- Field: Child and adolescent psychiatry
- Institutions: Mount Sinai Morningside
- Awards: Honorary citizen of Burgas
- Website: https://iliyanivanovmd.com/

Iliyan Stoyanov Ivanov is a Bulgarian American psychiatrist.

== Early life and education ==
Iliyan Ivanov was born on 18 July 1963 in Burgas, Bulgaria. He graduated medicine at the Medical University of Varna with summa cum laude. While studying at the Geo Milev English Language High School, Ivanov received his fine arts training under the mentorship of internationally recognized Bulgarian painter George Yanakiev. In 1994 Ivanov emigrated to the United States, and until 1996 lived in Nashville, Tennessee and Anderson, Indiana. In 1996 Ivanov moved to New York City, where he lives with his wife and two children.

== Career ==
=== Scientific ===
Ivanov studied psychiatry and did medical residencies in clinical psychiatry at the Maimonides Medical Center and the Mount Sinai Hospital, where he also had a fellowship in child psychiatry. In 2011-2012 he was also a junior scholar at the Alcohol Medical Scholar Program. He is a professor of psychiatry at the Icahn School of Medicine in New York and a medical director of CARES and FuTuReS programs at Mount Sinai St. Luke's Hospital. He is author of over 60 peer-reviewed publications featured in the American Journal of Psychiatry, JAMA Psychiatry and the Journal of Neuropsychopharmacology. He has contributed over 10 chapters to different textbooks on psychiatric and addiction disorders.

=== Artistic ===
Ivanov and his wife are among the associate producers of the short drama film Feeling Through, nominated for the 2021 Academy Award for Best Live Action Short Film, which won eight different awards in several festivals.

Ivanov is also an artist, who started with a one-person show, “Tides of Time,” at the Ryden Galleries in Anderson. He has presented his art at different galleries in New York, among them Chashama and CURB Galleries, as well as the New York Collection at the Albright-Knox gallery in Buffalo, the d.u.m.b.o. International Art Festival, the Toronto Art Salon, the New York Emerging Artists Gala, Denise Bibro Fine Art and others. He had his first Internet show at the ImagineStation website in 2004, and had since presented at Neoimage, Energy gallery, and Projekt30.

Ivanov, together with other colleagues of his, is a member of a music band, called The Shrinks.

== Professional affiliations and awards ==
Ivanov is a member of the Board of Directors of the New York Council on Child and Adolescent Psychiatry (NYCCAP). He is also a member of the Adolescent Substance Abuse Committee at the American Academy of Child and Adolescent Psychiatry (AACAP) and of the Program Committee of the Society of Biological Psychiatry. He has been recognized for his work as the 2015 Distinguished Fellow of the AACAP and the 2019 Hulse Award by the NYCCAP, among others. Ivanov and his wife, Dana Prodanova, are honorary citizens of Burgas.
