= Ignjatić =

Origin
- Language: Serbo-Croatian
- Origin: Ignjat
- Region of origin: Old Herzegovina

Other names
- Variant forms: Ignjatich; Gnjatić; Ignjatović

Ignjatić (Serbian Cyrillic: Игњатић), is a Serbian surname, a patronymic derived from the masculine given name Ignjat and mostly found in Bosnia and Herzegovina, Croatia and Serbia.

The vast majority of bearers of the surname are Eastern Orthodox (Serbian Orthodox Church) and declare as ethnic Serbs, although there are some Croats with the surname. Most of the Orthodox maintain the tradition of slava (patron saint veneration) of St. John the Baptist (Jovanjdan) - other slavas are present as well (such as Saint George's Day).

It may refer to the following people:

- Dragana Ignjatić, a Serbian female kickboxer and gold medalist at the 1993 WAKO World Amateur Championships
- Draško Ignjatić, a Bosnian news presenter; former program director of the RTRS
- Nina and Škoro "Ignjo" Ignjatić, fictional characters in The Scent of Rain in the Balkans, a historical novel written by Gordana Kuić
