= Ignacia =

Ignacia is a given name, the feminine version of Ignacio. It may refer to:

- Ignacia del Espíritu Santo or Mother Ignacia (1663–1748), Filipino Roman Catholic Religious Sister, declared Venerable by Pope Benedict XVI in 2007
- Ignacia Allamand (born 1981), Chilean film and television actress
- Ignacia Bordallo Butler (d. 1993), Chamorro businesswoman and entrepreneur
- Ignacia Cabrera (born 1987), Chilean retired volleyball player
- Ignacia Jasso (1920-?), Mexican drug dealer, founder of one of the first drug cartels in northern Mexico
- Ignacia Reachy (1816–1866), Mexican female soldier who fought the French during the War of Intervention
- Ignacia Zeballos Taborga (1831–1904), Bolivian seamstress and grocer who enlisted in the army, famed for caring for the wounded

== See also ==
- Santa Ignacia, Tarlac, Philippines, a 2nd-class municipality
