= Ihnatenko =

Ihnatenko or Ignatenko (Ukrainian: Ігнатенко; Russian: Игнатенко; Belarusian: Ігнаценка) is a gender-neutral Ukrainian surname, derived from the given name Ihnat (Ignatius). Notable people with the surname include:

- Aleksandr Ignatenko (born 1951), Russian footballer and coach
- Artyom Ignatenko (born 1990), Kazakhstani ice hockey player
- Danylo Ihnatenko (born 1997), Ukrainian footballer
- Dmitry Ignatenko (disambiguation), multiple individuals
- Oleksandr Ihnatenko (born 1993), Ukrainian footballer
- Petr Ignatenko (born 1987), Russian road racing cyclist
- Pavel Ignatenko (born 1995), Belarusian figure skater
- Pavlo Ihnatenko (born 1973), Ukrainian economist and politician
- Vasily Ignatenko (1961–1986), Soviet firefighter
- Vladislav Ignatenko (born 1998), Ukrainian-born Russian footballer

== See also ==
- 8787 Ignatenko, a minor planet
