= Ignatov =

Ignatov, Ignatow (Russian: Игнатов; Bulgarian: Игнатов), or Ignatova (feminine; Игнатова), is a popular Russian and Bulgarian surname which may refer to:

- Alexandra Ignatova, (born 2004), Russian figure skater
- Amy Ignatow, (born 1977), American cartoonist
- Andrey Ignatov (born 1968), Russian long jumper
- David Ignatow (1914–1997), American poet
- Evgeni Ignatov (runner) (born 1959), Bulgarian long-distance runner
- Evgeni Ignatov (footballer) (born 1988), Bulgarian football player
- Hasan & Ibrahim Ignatov (born 2003), Bulgarian twin child pianists
- Lilia Ignatova (born 1965), Bulgarian gymnast
- Makar Ignatov (born 2000), Russian figure skater
- Mihaela Ignatova, Bulgarian mathematician
- Mikhail Ignatov (born 2000), Russian football player
- Mel Ignatow, American murderer
- Natalya Ignatova (born 1973), Russian sprinter
- Nikolay Ignatov (1901–1966), Soviet politician
- Roman Ignatov (born 1973), Russian football player
- Ruja Ignatova (born 1980), Bulgarian financial criminal
- Sergei Ignatov (born 1960), Bulgarian politician and Egyptologist
- Sergej Ignatov (born 1950), Russian juggler
- Stojan Ignatov (born 1979), Bulgarian football player
- Valentin Ignatov (surgeon)
- Valentin Ignatov (footballer) (born 1966), Bulgarian football player
- Viktor Ignatov (born 1968), Russian politician
- Yevgeny Ignatov (canoeist) (born 1979), Russian sprint canoer

== See also ==
- Dr. Ignatova (disambiguation)
- Ignatyev
- Ignatów (disambiguation) (for Polish place names)
