= Paraskev Stoyanov =

Bulgarian doctor and anarchist (1871–1941)

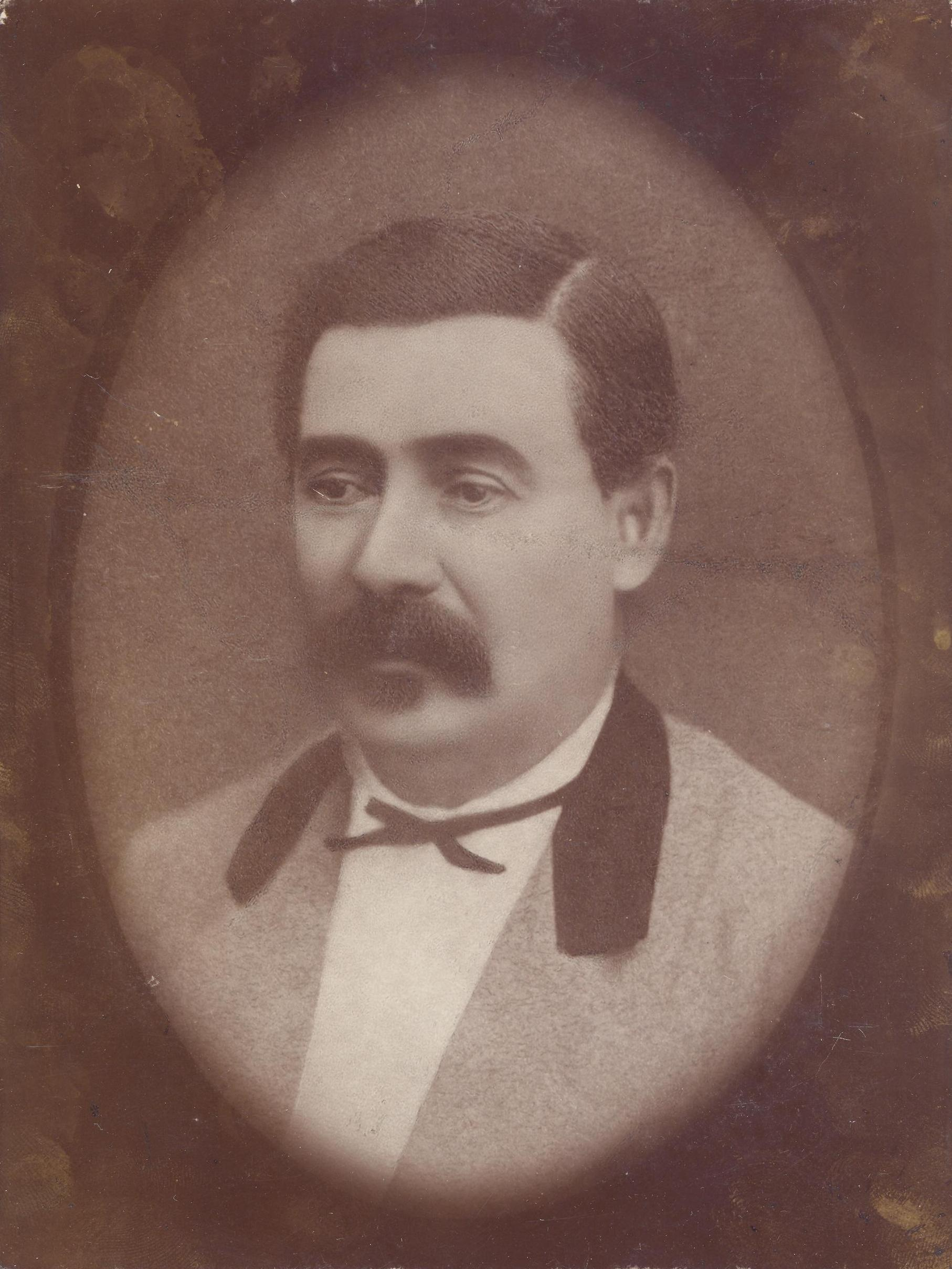
- Portrait of Paraskev
- Born: January 30, 1871; Giurgiu, Romania
- Died: November 14, 1941 (aged 70); Sofia, Bulgaria

Academic background
- Influences: Peter Kropotkin, Karl Marx, Errico Malatesta

Academic work
- School or tradition: Anarchist, Socialist

Paraskev Ivanchov Stoyanov (Bulgarian: Параскев Стоянов; Romanian: Paraschiv Stoian; January 30, 1871 – November 14, 1941) was a surgeon, anarchist, historian and professor. He is considered one of the fathers of Bulgarian and Romanian anarchism.

== Biography ==
The son of Ivancho Stoyanov, a Bulgarian active militant for national liberation from Roussé, and Gabriela von Walter, a German woman, Paraskev was born on January 30, 1871, in the city of Giurgiu, Romania, where his father had fled to escape persecution from the Ottomans. Belonging to a wealthy environment, Paraskev Stoyanov enjoyed a solid education, he studied at Bucharest's "Saint Sava" high school and at medical universities in Romania, France and Switzerland. After primary school in Bucharest, he adhered to socialist ideas through high school, then to anarchism after reading Peter Kropotkin's pamphlet "An Appeal to the Young". Thus, in high school, he founded book clubs for students studying socialism and anarchism and began to spread anarchism among the workers in Romania, coming to be considered the father of anarchism in the country. He translated into Romanian Errico Malatesta's numerous pamphlets, including "For The Voters", "Between Peasants " and "Anarchy". While in Geneva, he collaborated with his anarchist friend, Alexander Atabekian, and in the house of the latter, they managed to publish revolutionary propaganda.

In 1890, he went to perfect his studies of medicine in Paris, and took part in an international conference of students and the publication of a libertarian manifesto with Italian libertarian socialist Francesco Saverio Merlino. Arrested the same day, then released on bail a few months later, he moved to Italy, then found refuge for a time in Switzerland, where he met the leading theorists of the anarchist movement: Peter Kropotkin and Élisée Reclus.

After graduating in medicine at Würzburg, Germany (1895), he became a professor of surgery in the first propaedeutics Medical Faculty in Sofia and wrote the first textbooks on surgery. In 1895, as a medical student, Stoyanov climbed Mt. Grand Combin, Switzerland, reaching 4,318 m (14,167 ft), and was commended by Aleko Konstantinov, who is considered a pioneer of Bulgarian alpinism. This is the first documented ascent of a Bulgarian to a height greater than 4000 m.

Stoyanov lived and worked in Varna between 1905 and 1918. There he established the Children Sea Sanatorium for Tuberculosis of Bones and Joints which was the only one of its kind on the Balkan Peninsula. Originally it was located in inadequate sheds in the area of "Karantinata". In the sanatorium were admitted children from 3 to 15 years of age from all over Bulgaria with no differentiation in their social status. From all the children under treatment 95% either improved their condition or were fully recovered. Prof. Dr. Stoyanov gained a worldwide recognition as one of the founders of Thalassotherapy (Seawater Therapy) and Heliotherapy (Sun Treatment). He urged persistently, "Bulgarians should turn to the sea and start using its values!"

Today, as the founder of Bulgarian surgery, Paraskev is the namesake of the Medical University of Varna and Multi-profile Hospital for Active Treatment in Lovech. Streets in Pomorie and Varna also bear his name.

== See also ==
- Anarchism in Romania
