= Aneliya Klisarova =

Bulgarian politician

Minister of Education and Science
- In office 29 May 2013 – 6 August 2014
- Prime Minister: Plamen Oresharski
- Preceded by: Nikolai Miloshev
- Succeeded by: Rumyana Kolarova

Personal details
- Born: 13 December 1961 (age 64) Varna, Bulgaria
- Party: Coalition for Bulgaria
- Education: Medical University of Varna
- Occupation: Professor, politician, physician

Aneliya Dimitrova Klisarova (born 13 December 1961) is a Bulgarian medical scientist and professor. In addition to her career as an academic and as doctor, she has also been elected for various political posts.

== Biography ==
Klisarova graduated from the Medical University of Varna first as a Master Physician, and later as a specialist in radiology and nuclear medicine. She has practiced in Sofia, Munich, Erlangen, Basel, Bern and Aarau. She has served two terms as the rector of the Medical University of Varna, 2004–2012.

Klisarova is the author of more than 150 publications and articles in scientific journals.

== Awards and honors ==
- Corresponding Member of the Radiological Society of North America (RSNA).
- Member and Honorary President of the Bulgarian Society for Nuclear Medicine (BSNM).
- National representative of Bulgaria and member of the board of the European Association of Nuclear Medicine until 2008, when she resigned due to her commitments as Rector of the Medical University of Varna.
- Doctor honoris causa of three universities – Ovidius University, Trakya University, and Odessa National Medical University.
- Organizer, speaker, and participant of multiple scientific, academic and high-level conferences as well as various international projects.
- Minister of the Education and Science of Bulgaria, 2013–2014.
- Member of Bulgarian Parliament as a representative of the Coalition for Bulgaria party 2013–2014, and 2017 until present.
