= Iñaki Elejalde =

Spanish footballer

Personal information
- Full name: Iñaki Elejalde Rodríguez
- Date of birth: 20 January 1999 (age 27)
- Place of birth: Madrid, Spain
- Height: 1.74 m (5 ft 9 in)
- Position: Forward

Team information
- Current team: Pontevedra
- Number: 11

Youth career
- 2006–2012: Juventud Sanse
- 2012–2014: Alcobendas
- 2014–2017: Real Madrid
- 2017–2018: Alavés

Senior career*
| Years | Team | Apps | (Gls) |
| 2018–2020 | Alavés B | 56 | (8) |
| 2020–2022 | Las Palmas B | 56 | (12) |
| 2021–2022 | Las Palmas | 1 | (0) |
| 2022–2023 | Algeciras | 35 | (5) |
| 2023–2024 | Mérida | 19 | (4) |
| 2024–2025 | Antequera | 27 | (4) |
| 2025–2026 | Lokeren | 24 | (1) |
| 2026– | Pontevedra | 6 | (1) |
- * Club domestic league appearances and goals as of 3 October 2026

Iñaki Elejalde Rodríguez (born 20 January 1999) is a Spanish footballer who plays as a forward for Primera Federación club Pontevedra.

== Club career ==
Born in Madrid to a Basque father, Elejalde joined Real Madrid's La Fábrica in 2014, from Alcobendas CF. He left the club in 2017, and signed for Deportivo Alavés; in that campaign, he also made his senior debut with the latter's reserves in Tercera División.

Elejalde helped Alavés B in their promotion to Segunda División B in the 2018–19 season by scoring eight goals. On 5 October 2020, he signed for another reserve team, UD Las Palmas Atlético also in the third division.

Elejalde made his first team debut on 6 March 2021, coming on as a second-half substitute for Rafa Mújica in a 1–1 Segunda División home win against Rayo Vallecano. In June 2022, after scoring 11 goals in the 2021–22 Segunda División RFEF, he was definitely promoted to the main squad, but terminated his link on 26 August and signed for Primera Federación side Algeciras CF the following day.

On 23 July 2025, Elejalde signed a two-year contract with Lokeren in the Belgian second tier.
