= Iñaki Abad =

Spanish writer (born 1963)

- Born: 1963 (age 62–63); Bilbao
- Occupation: writer

Iñaki Abad (born 1963, Bilbao) is a Spanish writer. He studied Spanish philology at university and worked as a journalist and radio announcer before moving to Sicily to teach at the University of Catania. In 1991, he joined the Instituto Cervantes; he has since directed the centres to Naples, Milán, and Prague. In 2002, having spent a decade in Italy, he wrote his first novel based on his memories of Bilbao. El hábito de la guerra was a spy novel, as was his second novel, Los malos adioses en Nápoles. Five years later, he set another spy novel in Naples, titled "Los malos adioses" (2007); both novels are centered around a mysterious Spanish intelligence officer, Fernando Sanmartín de Mayorga. He compiled his short stories in "Barbarie y otros relatos" (1996).
