= Ignác Frank =

Hungarian jurist (1788–1850)

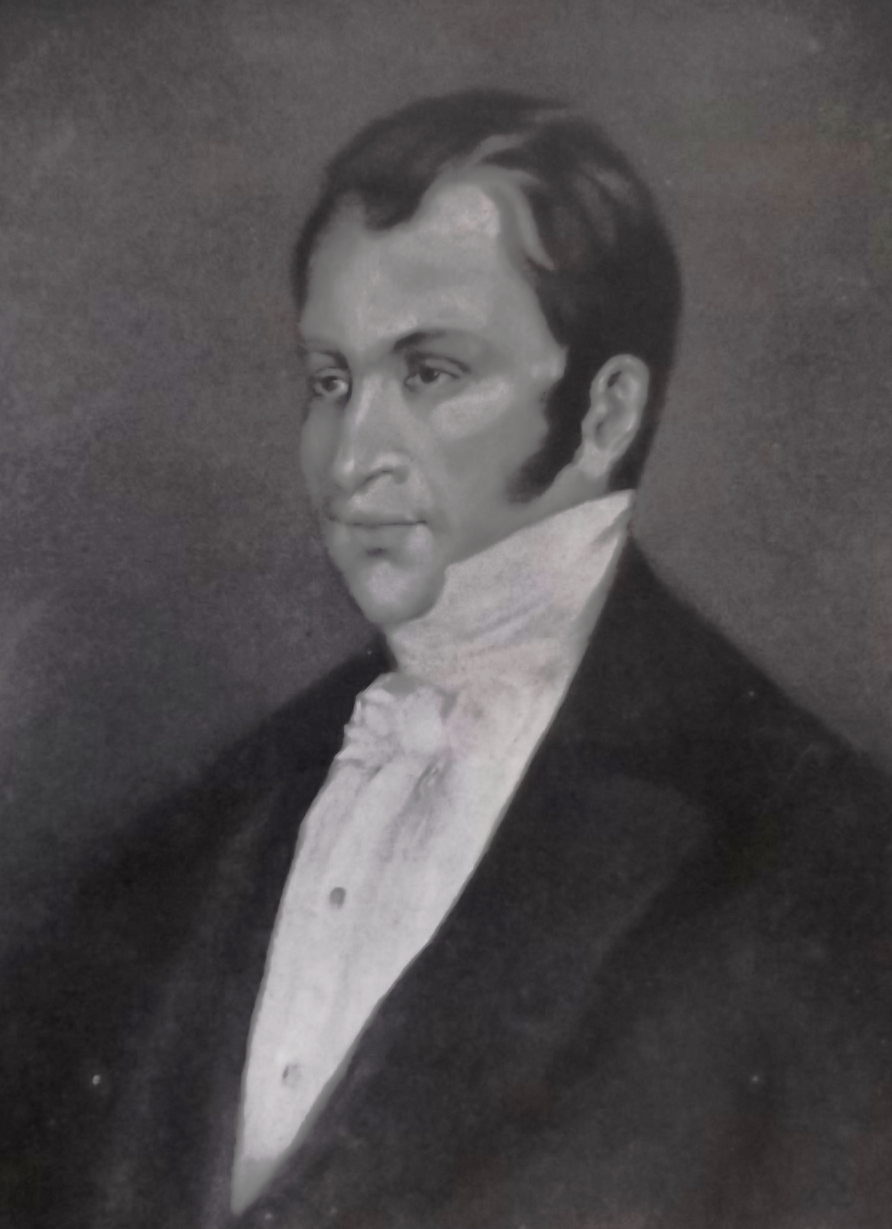
Ignác Frank (undated portrait)

Ignác Frank (1788–1850) was a Hungarian jurist and one of the most renowned private law scholars of his time.

== Life ==
After leaving the Piarist order in 1811, he studied law and was appointed professor for private law in Budapest in 1827. He was the last to compile the feudal Hungarian private law, and the first to do so in Hungarian. While generally a conservative scholar, he is acknowledged as having been ahead of his time in some respects, such as in his treatment of contracts to the benefit of third parties.
