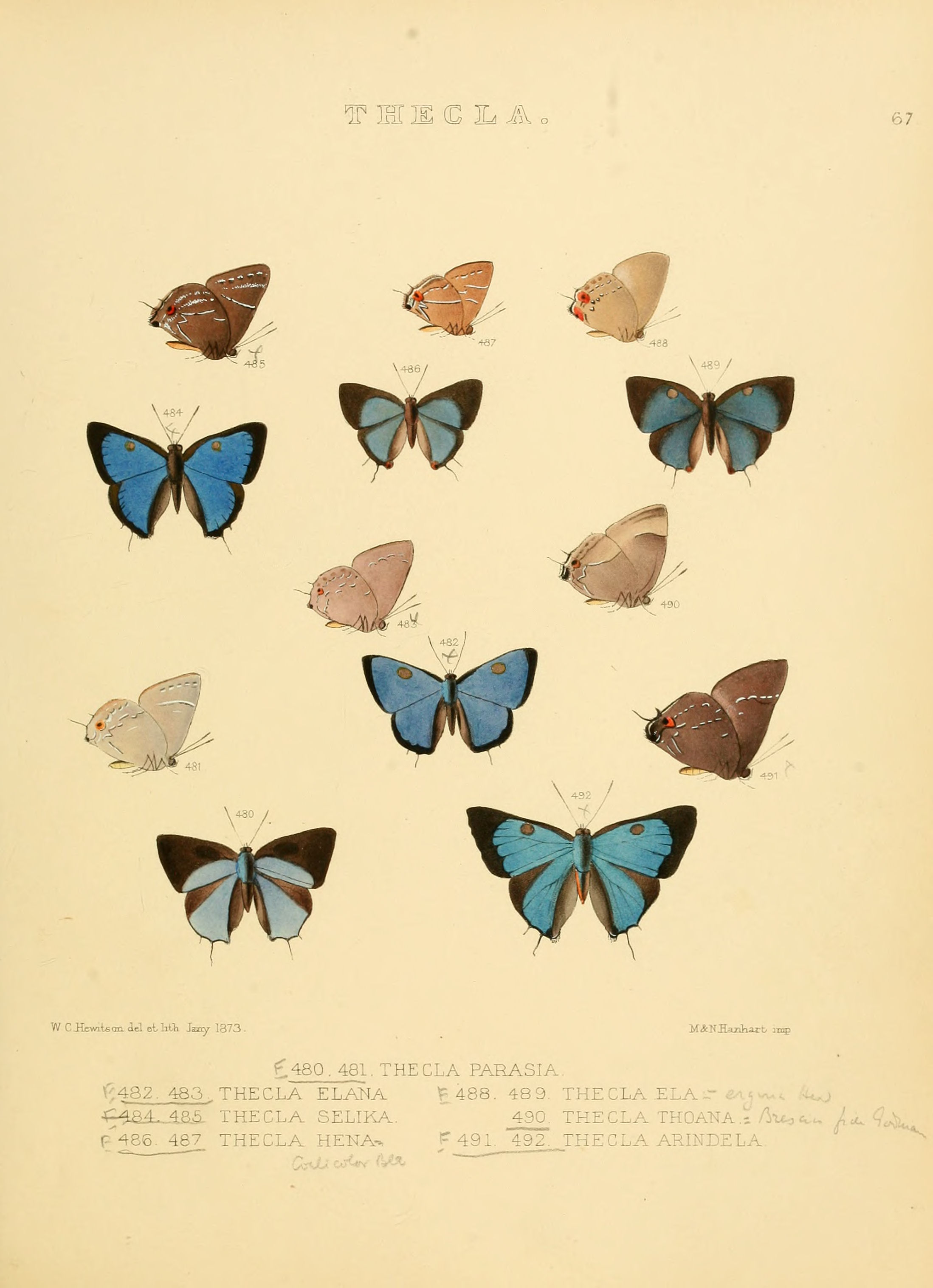
- Figures 482 and 483 Ignata elana

Scientific classification
- Domain: Eukaryota
- Kingdom: Animalia
- Phylum: Arthropoda
- Class: Insecta
- Order: Lepidoptera
- Family: Lycaenidae
- Tribe: Eumaeini
- Genus: Ignata; K. Johnson, 1992

= Ignata =

Butterfly genus in family Lycaenidae

Ignata is a Neotropical genus of butterflies in the family Lycaenidae.

== Species ==
- Ignata mulsus (Druce, 1907)
- Ignata elana (Hewitson, 1874)
- Ignata gadira (Hewitson, 1867)
- Ignata brasiliensis (Talbot, 1928)
- Ignata norax (Godman & Salvin, [1887])
- Ignata levis (Druce, 1907)
