= Ignaz =

Ignaz is a male given name, related to the name Ignatius. Notable people with this name include:

- Ignaz Brüll (1846–1907), Moravian-born pianist and composer who lived and worked in Vienna
- Ignaz Bösendorfer (1796–1859), Austrian musician and piano manufacturer
- Ignaz Franz Castelli (1780–1862), Austrian dramatist
- Ignaz Döllinger (1770–1841), German doctor, anatomist and physiologist
- Ignaz Aurelius Fessler (1756–1839), Hungarian ecclesiastic, politician, historian
- Ignaz Friedman (1882–1948), Polish pianist and composer
- Ignaz Fränzl (1736–1811), German violinist, composer
- Ignaz Günther (1725–1775), German sculptor and woodcarver
- Ignaz Holzbauer (1711–1783), German composer
- Ignaz Kirchner (1946–2018), German actor
- Ignaz Maybaum (1897–1976), rabbi and Jewish theologian
- Ignaz Moscheles (1794–1870), Bohemian composer
- Ignaz Pleyel (1757–1831), Austrian-born French composer
- Ignaz Puschnik (1934–2020), Austrian football player
- Ignaz Schiffermüller (1727–1806), Austrian naturalist
- Ignaz Rudolph Schiner (1813–1873), Austrian entomologist
- Ignaz Schuppanzigh (1776–1830), Austrian violinist
- Ignaz Schwinn (1860–1948), German-American bicycle manufacturer
- Ignaz Seipel (1876–1932), Austrian prelate and politician
- Ignaz Semmelweis (1818–1865), Hungarian physician
- Ignaz Friedrich Tausch (1793–1848), Bohemian botanist
- Ignaz Trebitsch-Lincoln (1879–1943), Hungarian adventurer and convicted con artist
- Ignaz Trollmann (1860–1919), Austro-Hungarian general
- Ignaz Venetz (1788–1859), Swiss engineer, naturalist, and glaciologist
- Ignaz von Born (1742–1791), Austrian mineralogist and metallurgist
- Ignaz von Döllinger (1799–1890), German theologian
- Ignaz von Olfers (1793–1871), German naturalist, historian and diplomat
- Ignaz von Plener (1810–1908), Austrian statesman
- Ignaz von Rudhart (1790–1838), Bavarian scholar
- Ignaz von Seyfried (1776–1841), Austrian musician, conductor and composer
- Ignaz von Szyszyłowicz (1857–1910), Polish botanist
- Ignaz Heinrich von Wessenberg (1774–1860), German writer and scholar

== See also ==
- Ignác
- Ignatz
- Ignatius
