= Dimitar Raykov =

Bulgarian surgeon and professor

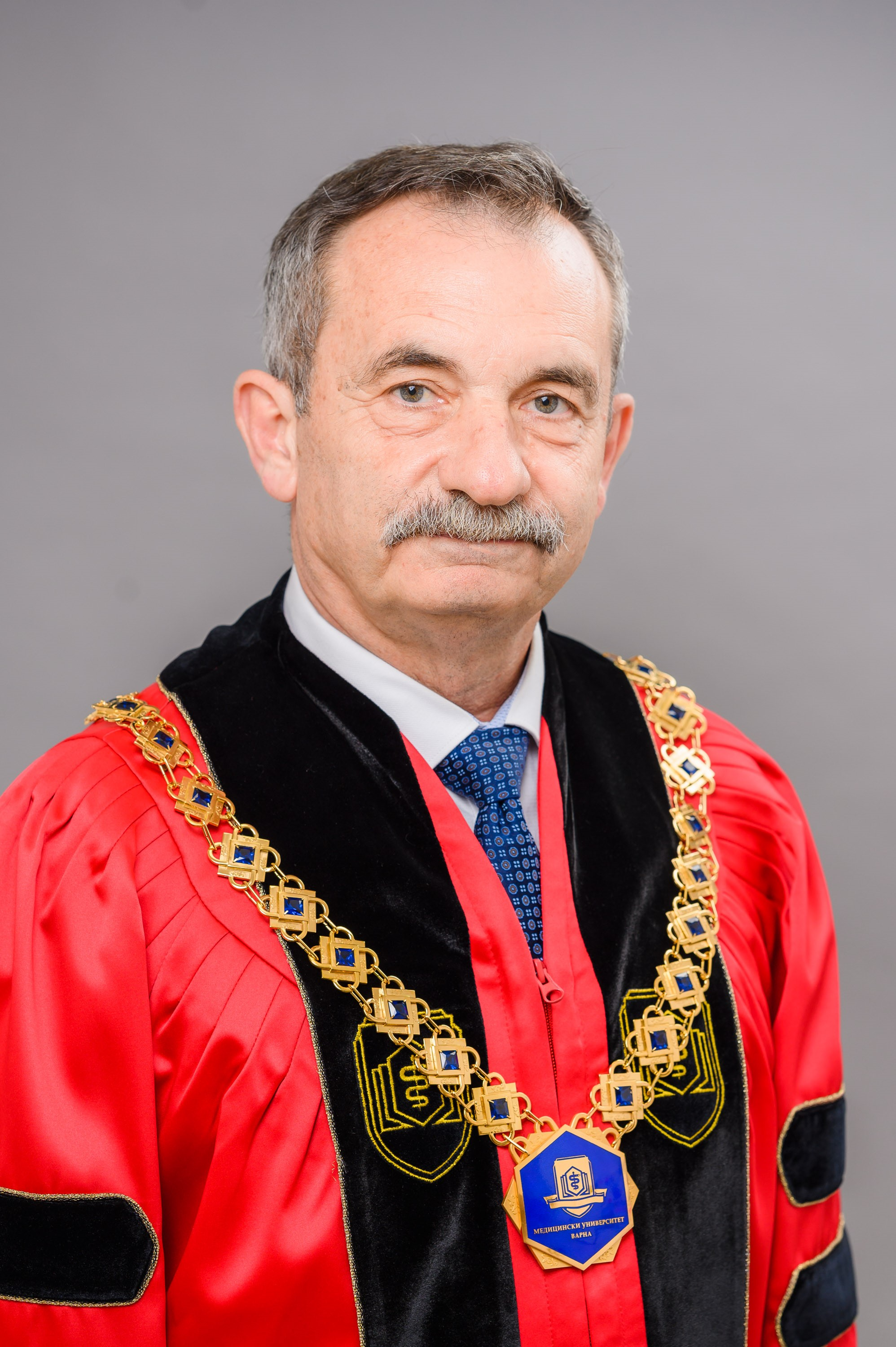
- Born: 1963 (age 62–63); Varna
- Occupation: Rector

Dimitar Ivanov Raykov is a Bulgarian orthopedic traumatologist, professor, and Rector of the Medical University of Varna (since 2024).

== Biography ==
Raykov was born in 1963 in Varna and studied at the First Language School in his native city. Raykov is a graduate of the Medical University of Varna (1990) and his specialty is in the field of Orthopedics and Traumatology (1997). He has done specializations in Austria (2003–2007).

He received his PhD in medicine (2008) by defending his dissertation titled Extracorporeal Shockwave Therapy in the Treatment of Limb Traumas and Diseases. His Associate Professor degree was acquired at the Department of Orthopedics and Traumatology at MU–Varna (2010). A DSc degree followed with a dissertation titled Conservative Treatment in Congenital Equinovarus Foot. The Ponseti Method—an Established Standard (2017). He became a professor in 2018.

Raykov was head of the Department of Orthopedics and Traumatology (2015–2024).

He is the 15th Rector of the Medical University of Varna (2024).

== Scientific Interests ==
Raykov's professional interests and specializations are in the following fields: ultrasound diagnostics and treatment of hip joint dysplasia in children (Stolzalpe AKH, Dr. Reinghard Graf, Austria); arthroscopy of the knee joint, hip and knee joint endoprosthesis, fundamentals of spinal stabilization, treatment of musculoskeletal deformities in children (AKH Wien, Universitätsklinikum); extracorporeal shockwave therapy in orthopedics (Stosswellenzentrum Wien, Dr. Wolfgang Shaden, Austria); osteosynthesis in bone fractures in children and adults.

His scientific work consists of over 100 scientific articles, proceedings, and posters, published in Bulgaria and abroad. He is the author of a monograph titled Enthesopathies in the Orthopedic Practice.

== Organization Memberships ==
Raykov is a member of:

- Bulgarian Orthopedics and Trauma Association (BOTA),
- the management board at the Pediatric Orthopedics Section at BOTA,
- vice chair of the Bulgarian Foot and Ankle Society,
- European Federation of National Associations of Orthopaedics and Traumatology (EFORT),
- International Society for Medical Shockwave Treatment (ISMST),
- Federation of the European Societies for the Surgery of the Hand (FESSH),
- International Federation of Societies for Surgery of the Hand (IFSSH),
- International Society for Musculoskeletal Ultrasound (ISMUS),
- the management board of the Bulgarian Association of Ultrasound in Medicine (Orthopedics Section).

He is a regional consultant in orthopedics and traumatology for Northeastern Bulgaria, a member of the editorial board of the Orthopedics and Traumatology journal, a coordinating member for Bulgaria of the American Austrian Foundation (AAF) for work and qualification of medical specialists with headquarters in Vienna, Austria.

Raykov is a chair of the Bulgarian national examination board for the Orthopedics and Traumatology specialty.
