= Ignacio García Malo =

Spanish playwright, translator, Hellenist, and writer (1760–1812)

Ignacio María Antonio García Malo (1 February 1760 – 25 June 1812) was a Spanish playwright, translator, Hellenist and writer.
