= Ignacio Uriarte =

Spanish politician (born 1980)

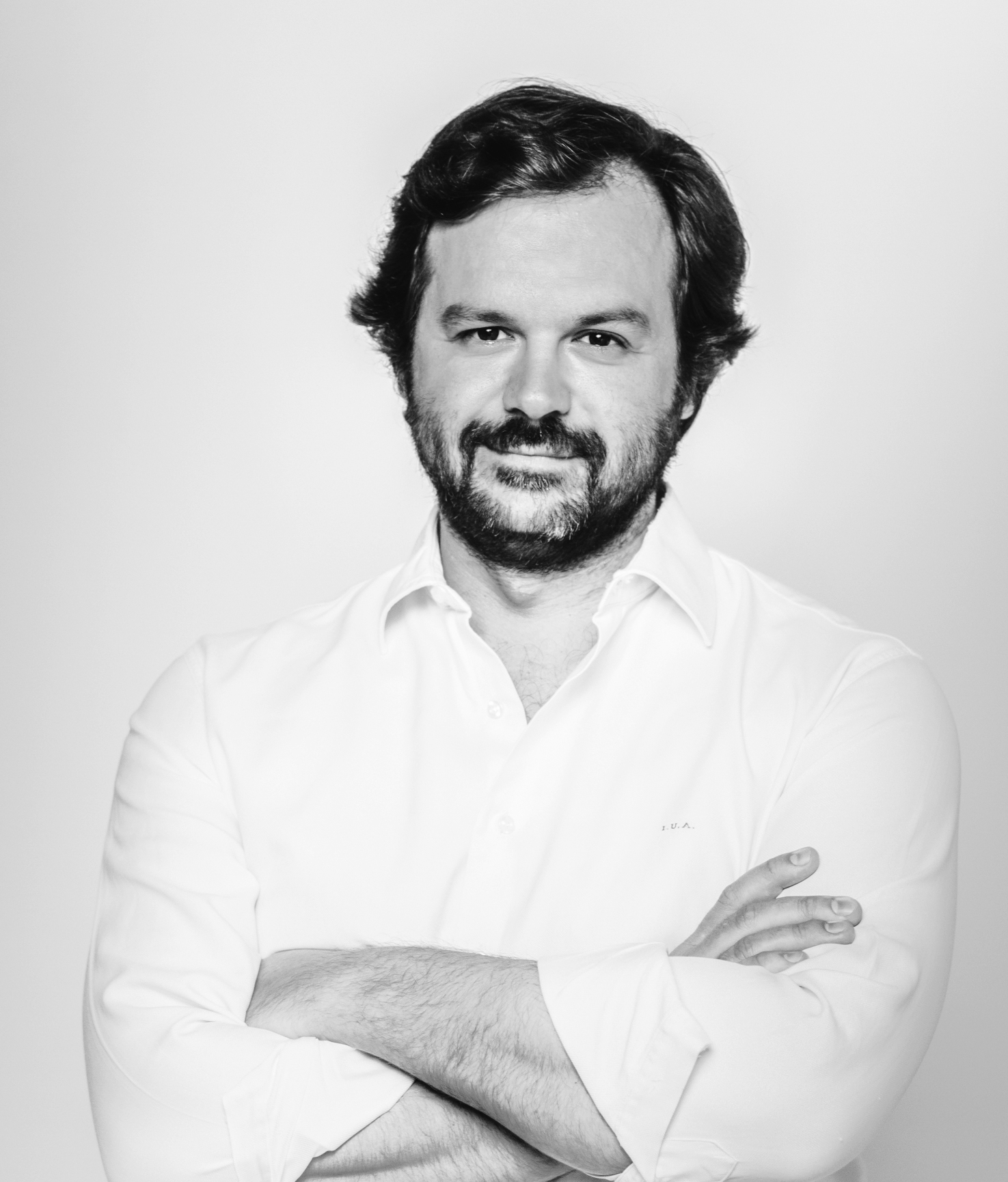

Ignacio Uriarte Ayala, known as Nacho Uriarte (Madrid, Spain, 7 August 1980) is a Spanish politician who belongs to the People's Party (PP).

Single, with a diploma in social work, Uriarte was elected national president of New Generations, the youth wing of the PP. For the 2008 Spanish General Election he was selected as one of the PP candidates for Valencia province, being seventh on the PP list and was elected to the national parliament. He has also served on the National Executive of the PP.

In February 2010, Uriarte crashed his car while driving under the influence in Madrid; he was charged for crimes against road safety. At the time he was charged, he was a spokesman for the Road Safety and Traffic Accident Prevention Committee for the Spanish parliament. He admitted the accusations and resigned his position in the Traffic Accident Prevention Committee but remained a member of parliament. For the 2011 Spanish General Election he was re-elected after again being seventh on the list for Valencia province. During the election campaign he was responsible for organising the PP's online campaign.
