= Iñaki Alcelay =

Spanish footballer

Personal information
- Full name: Iñaki Alcelay Larrión
- Date of birth: 5 August 1961 (age 65)
- Place of birth: Legazpi, Spain
- Height: 1.79 m (5 ft 10 in)
- Position: Forward

Youth career
- 1976–1978: Ilintxa Legazpi
- 1978–1981: Real Sociedad

Senior career*
Years	Team	Apps	(Gls)
1981–1984	San Sebastián	34	(4)
1984–1985	Sabadell	31	(2)
1985–1987	Lleida	48	(21)
1987–1991	Sabadell	73	(9)
- * Club domestic league appearances and goals as of 24 November 1990

Iñaki Alcelay Larrión (born 5 August 1961) is a Spanish former footballer who played as a forward.

Formed on amateur Ilitxa Legazpi and Real Sociedad, Alcelay made his senior debut for San Sebastián, the B-team, in the 1980–81 Segunda División B season. He made his La Liga debut in the 1987–88 campaign, for Sabadell.

After a serious injury, Alcelay retired as footballer at the end of 1990–91 season.
