= Carlo Ignazio Pozzi =

German painter and architect

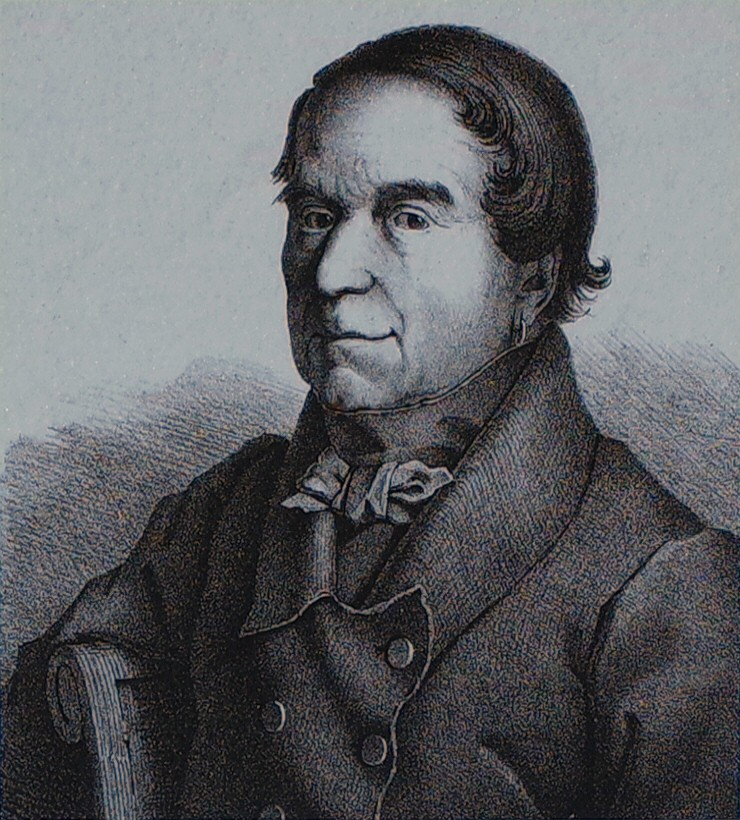
- Carlo Ignazio Pozzi
- Born: 1766; Mannheim, Holy Roman Empire
- Died: 1842 (aged 75–76)
- Education: Academy of Mannheim
- Known for: Painting; architecture
- Father: Francesco Pozzi (stuccoist)

Carlo Ignazio Pozzi (1786–1842), was a German painter and architect. He was born in Mannheim, Holy Roman Empire, to a Swiss father, Francesco Pozzi (stuccoist). He studied at the Academy of his native city.

He traveled through the Netherlands, and then visited Parma. He painted historical scenes, portraits, and landscapes. In 1779 he was engaged in scene painting at Dessau.
