= Ignacia Reachy =

Ignacia Reachy (1816–1866) was a soldier during the War of Intervention.

== Biography ==
Reachy was born in Guadalajara, Viceroyalty of New Spain in 1816. Reachy formed a women's battalion to help defend Guadalajara from the French during the War of Intervention (1861-1866). Soon after, Reachy left Guadalajara to join the Army of the East and many male officers gifted to her military gear and attire because she was considered a "valiant woman patriot". She was given riding boots by Colonel Antonio Rojas, a second lieutenant uniform by Colonel Gonzalez, and was put in the Second Division under the command of Jose Maria Arteaga by Ignacio Zaragoza. On 28 April 1862, Reachy showed her true bravery; Reachy was captured by the French while trying to cover and protect the retreat of Arteaga. Reachy was imprisoned for a year, before escaping then going back to Arteaga for more orders. Reachy was made Commander of the Lancers of Jalisco until she was killed in battle in 1866.
