= Ignacio López =

Ignacio López or Nacho López may refer to:

- Saint Ignatius of Loyola (Íñigo Oñaz López de Loyola, 1491–1556), founder of the Society of Jesus (Jesuits)
- Ignacio López de Ayala (1739–1789), Spanish writer, astronomer, and historian
- Ignacio López Rayón (1773–1832), leader of the revolutionary government, during the Mexican War of Independence
- Nacho López (1923–1986), Mexican photojournalist
- Ignacio López Tarso (1925–2023), Mexican actor
- Ignacio Lopez (comedian) (born 1986), Spanish and Welsh comedian
- Nacho López (footballer) (born 1987), Spanish football defender and midfielder
- Ignacio L. Lopez (born 1908), plaintiff in the 1944 U.S. court case Lopez v. Seccombe

== See also ==
- Estadio Ignacio López Rayón, football stadium in Michoacán, Mexico
