= Dmitry Ignatenko =

Dmitry Ignatenko may refer to:

- Dmitry Ignatenko (footballer, born 1969), Soviet and Russian footballer
- Dmitry Ignatenko (footballer, born 1988), Belarusian footballer
- Dmitry Ignatenko (footballer, born 1995), Belarusian footballer
