= Ignác =

Ignác, also sometimes spelled Ignac in English, is the Czech, Slovak and Hungarian version of the name Ignatius.

Ignac is also a surname, among the most common surnames in the Međimurje County of Croatia.

Notable people with this name include:

- Ignác Alpár (1855–1928), Hungarian architect
- Jozef Ignác Bajza (1755–1836), Slovak writer, satirist and Catholic priest
- Ignác Batthyány (1741–1798), Hungarian Roman Catholic Bishop of Transylvania
- Jan Josef Ignác Brentner (1689–1742), Czech composer of baroque era
- Ignác Frank (1788–1850), Hungarian jurist and private law scholar
- Ignác Goldziher (1850–1921), Hungarian orientalist
- Ignác Gyulay (1763–1831), Hungarian military officer
- Ignác Irhás (born 1985), Hungarian football player
- Jiří Ignác Linek (1725–1791), renowned Czech late-Baroque composer and pedagogue
- Ignác Raab (1715–1787), Czech Jesuit and painter
- Ignác Šechtl (1840–1911), pioneer of Czech photography and cinematography
- Ignác Šustala (1822–1881), Czech entrepreneur, founder of the company that became Tatra
- Ignác Török (1795–1849), honvéd general in the Hungarian Army

== See also ==
- Ignaz
