= Ignacio González =

Ignacio González or Nacho González may refer to:

== Footballers ==
- Ignacio González (footballer, born 1944), Guatemalan goalkeeper
- Nacho González (footballer, born 1971), Argentine goalkeeper
- Nacho González (footballer, born 1982), Uruguayan midfielder
- Ignacio González (footballer, born 1983), Uruguayan centre-back
- Ignacio González (footballer, born 1984), Mexican defender
- Ignacio González (footballer, born 1989), Chilean goalkeeper
- Ignacio González (footballer, born 1991), Mexican right-back
- Ignacio González (footballer, born 1993), Uruguayan football winger

== Others ==
- Ignacio González (fencer), Cuban foil fencer on the 1995 & 1997 World Fencing Championships
- Ignacio González Gollaz (1929–2019), Mexican politician and businessman
- Ignacio González González (born 1960), Spanish politician
- Ignacio González King (born 1980), Argentinian tennis player
- Ignacio González-Llubera (1893–1962), Spanish literary scholar
- Ignacio González (musician) (born 1973), Mexican drummer, a member of rock&roll band Cuca
- Ignacio Jordà González (born 1973), Spanish pornographic actor known by his stage name Nacho Vidal
- Ignacio María González (politician) (1838–1915), president of the Dominican Republic in the 1870s
