= Ivan Derventski =

Bulgarian footballer (1932–2018)

Personal information
- Date of birth: 12 June 1932
- Date of death: 4 December 2018 (aged 86)
- Position: Goalkeeper

International career
Years	Team	Apps	(Gls)
1957–1958	Bulgaria	3	(0)

Ivan Derventski (12 June 1932 – 4 December 2018) was a Bulgarian footballer. He played for the Bulgaria national football team from 1957 to 1958.
