= Ignatia =

Ignatia can refer to:

- Gnatia, a city of the Peucetii, a tribe in ancient Italy
- a feminine version of the given name Ignatius
  - Ignatia Broker (1919–1987), American writer and community leader
- plants belonging to the species Strychnos ignatii, and products derived from them, such as
  - Ignatia amara, a homoeopathic remedy
