= Ignacio Rodríguez (programmer) =

Uruguayan programmer

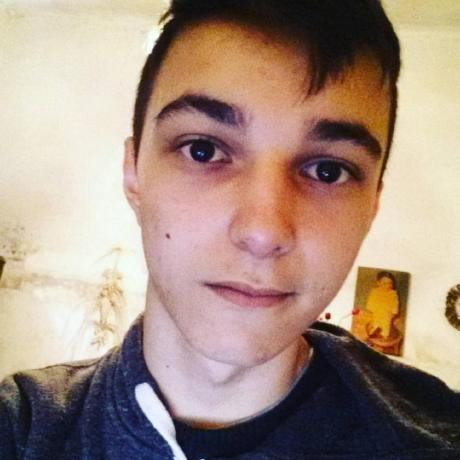
- Self-portrait from May 2016
- Born: 1999 (age 26–27); Montevideo
- Occupation: programmer

Ignacio Rodríguez (born 1999 in Montevideo) is an Uruguayan programmer, two-time winner of worldwide programming competition Google Code-in (in 2013 and in 2014) and a member of the Sugar Labs educational open-source organization. Rodríguez lives in Canelones.
