= Ignatius =

- Gender: Male

Other gender
- Feminine: Ignatia

Origin
- Origin: Latin
- Meaning: "fire"

Other names
- Related names: Iggy, Ignacio, Ignacy, Ignat, Ignatz, Ignaz, Ignazio, Ignác, Ignjat, Inácio, Inaki, Inigo

Ignatius is a male name and a surname, from ignis "fire".

Notable people with the name include:

== Given name ==
=== Religious ===
- Ignatius of Antioch (35–108), saint and martyr, Apostolic Father, early Christian bishop
- Ignatius of Constantinople (797–877), Catholic and Eastern Orthodox saint, Patriarch of Constantinople
- Ignatios the Deacon (780/790 – after 845), Byzantine bishop and writer
- Ignatius of Bulgaria, patriarch in 1272–1277
- Ignatius Brianchaninov (1807–1867), Russian Orthodox saint, bishop and ascetical writer
- Ignatius of Jesus (1596–1667), Italian Catholic missionary friar
- Ignatius of Laconi (1701–1781), Italian Catholic saint
- Ignatius of Loyola (1491–1556), Basque Catholic saint and founder of the Society of Jesus
- Ignatius of Moscow (1540–1620), Russian Orthodox Patriarch
- Ignatius Moses I Daoud (or Moussa Daoud) (1930–2012), Syrian Catholic Patriarch
- Ignatius Zakka I Iwas (1933-2014), Syriac Orthodox Patriarch
- Ignatius III Atiyah, 17th-century Melkite Greek Catholic Patriarch of Antioch
- Ignatius III David, 13th-century Syriac Orthodox Church Patriarch
- Ignatius IV Sarrouf (1742–1812), Melkite Greek Catholic Patriarch of Antioch
- Ignatius IV (Hazim) of Antioch (1921–2012), Greek Orthodox Patriarch of Antioch
- Ignatius V Qattan (1756–1833), Melkite Greek Catholic Patriarch of Antioch
- First name of all the Syrian Catholic Patriarchs of Antioch since the 15th century
- Ignatius Suharyo Hardjoatmodjo (born 1950), Indonesian prelate and current archbishop of Jakarta
- Ignatius Phakoe (1927–1989), Lesotho Roman Catholic bishop

=== Other ===
- Ignatius Kutu Acheampong (1931–1979), Ghanaian military ruler
- Ignatius Bernstein (1846–1900), Russian railroad engineer
- Ignatius Bonomi (1787–1870), British architect
- Ignatius Cadette (born 1957), West Indian cricketer
- Ignatius Valentine Chirol (1852–1929), British writer and diplomat
- Ignatius Chombo (born 1952), Zimbabwean politician
- Ignatius L. Donnelly (1831–1901), American politician and writer
- Arthur Ignatius Conan Doyle (1859–1930), British writer and physician
- Ignatius J. Galantin (1910–2004), American admiral
- Ignatius Ganago (born 1999), Cameroonian professional footballer
- Ignatius Joseph Kasimo Hendrowahyono (1900–1986), Indonesian politician
- Ignatius Jones (1957–2024), Australian singer and producer
- Ignatius K. Musaazi (1905–1990), Ugandan politician
- Ignatius Leong (born 1956), Singaporean Chess Organizer
- Ignatius O'Brien, 1st Baron Shandon (1857–1930), Irish lawyer
- Igantius Xavier Pereira (1888–1951), Indian Tamil-Sri Lankan businessman and politician
- Ignatius Sancho (1729–1780), British writer
- Ignatius Scoles (1834–1896), British architect, priest and writer
- Ignatius Shixwameni (born 1966), Namibian politician
- Ignatius Zhuwakiyi (born 1969), Zimbabwean sculptor

== Surname ==
- Adi Ignatius (born 1959), American journalist
- David Ignatius (born 1950), American journalist and writer
- Hannes Ignatius (1871–1941), Finnish general
- Karl Ferdinand Ignatius (1837–1909), Finnish politician
- Paul Ignatius (1920–2025), American government official and businessman

== Fictional characters ==
- Ignatius, in the video game Fire Emblem Fates
- Dr. Ignatius "Iggy" Frome, psychiatrist in TV series New Amsterdam
- Ignatius Gallaher, in the short story "A Little Cloud" by James Joyce
- Ignatius Mortimer Meen, the villain in the 1995 video game I.M. Meen
- Ignatius Martin Perrish, in Horns by Joe Hill and the film adaptation
- Ignatius J. Reilly, in A Confederacy of Dunces by John Kennedy Toole
- Horatio Thelonious Ignacious Crustaceous Sebastian, in Disney’s 1989 film The Little Mermaid
- Percy Ignatius Weasley, in Harry Potter by J. K. Rowling

== See also ==
- 3562 Ignatius, main-belt asteroid
- St. Ignatius
- Vatroslav
- Żegota
