= Mihaela Ignatova =

Bulgarian mathematician

Mihaela Ignatova is a Bulgarian mathematician who won the 2020 Sadosky Prize of the Association for Women in Mathematics for her research in mathematical analysis, and in particular in partial differential equations and fluid dynamics.

== Education ==
In 2004, Ignatova earned both a bachelor's degree from Sofia University and a master's degree from the University of Nantes. She earned a second master's degree from Sofia University in 2006, working under the supervision of mathematician Emil Horozov. She then completed PhD studies in mathematics from University of Southern California in 2011 under the supervision of Igor Kukavica.

== Career ==
After working as a visiting assistant professor at the University of California, Riverside, a postdoctoral researcher at Stanford University, and an instructor at Princeton University, she moved to Temple University as an assistant professor in 2018.
