= Inácio =

Inácio is a common Spanish/Portuguese given name (previously spelled "Ignácio"; "Inácio" is modern orthography) and occasionally a surname.

Examples as a surname include:

- Alisha Inacio, American wrestler and manager
- Augusto Inácio, Portuguese football player
- Bankrol Hayden, American rapper born as Hayden Inacio
- Eunice Nangueve Inácio, Angolan peace activist
- José Inácio Ribeiro de Abreu e Lima, priest and lawyer killed for his involvement with the Pernambucan revolution
- Justin Inacio, Canadian lacrosse player
- Samuele Inacio, Italian footballer
- Piá, real name João Batista Inácio, Brazilian football player
- Joelson, real name Joelson José Inácio, Brazilian football player

Examples as a given name include:

- Lula, real name Luiz Inácio da Silva, president of Brazil
- Manuel Inácio da Silva Alvarenga, Brazilian poet
- Inácio Carneiro dos Santos (born 1996), Brazilian footballer

== See also ==
- Ignacio
