= Valentin Ignatov (surgeon) =

Bulgarian surgeon and academic

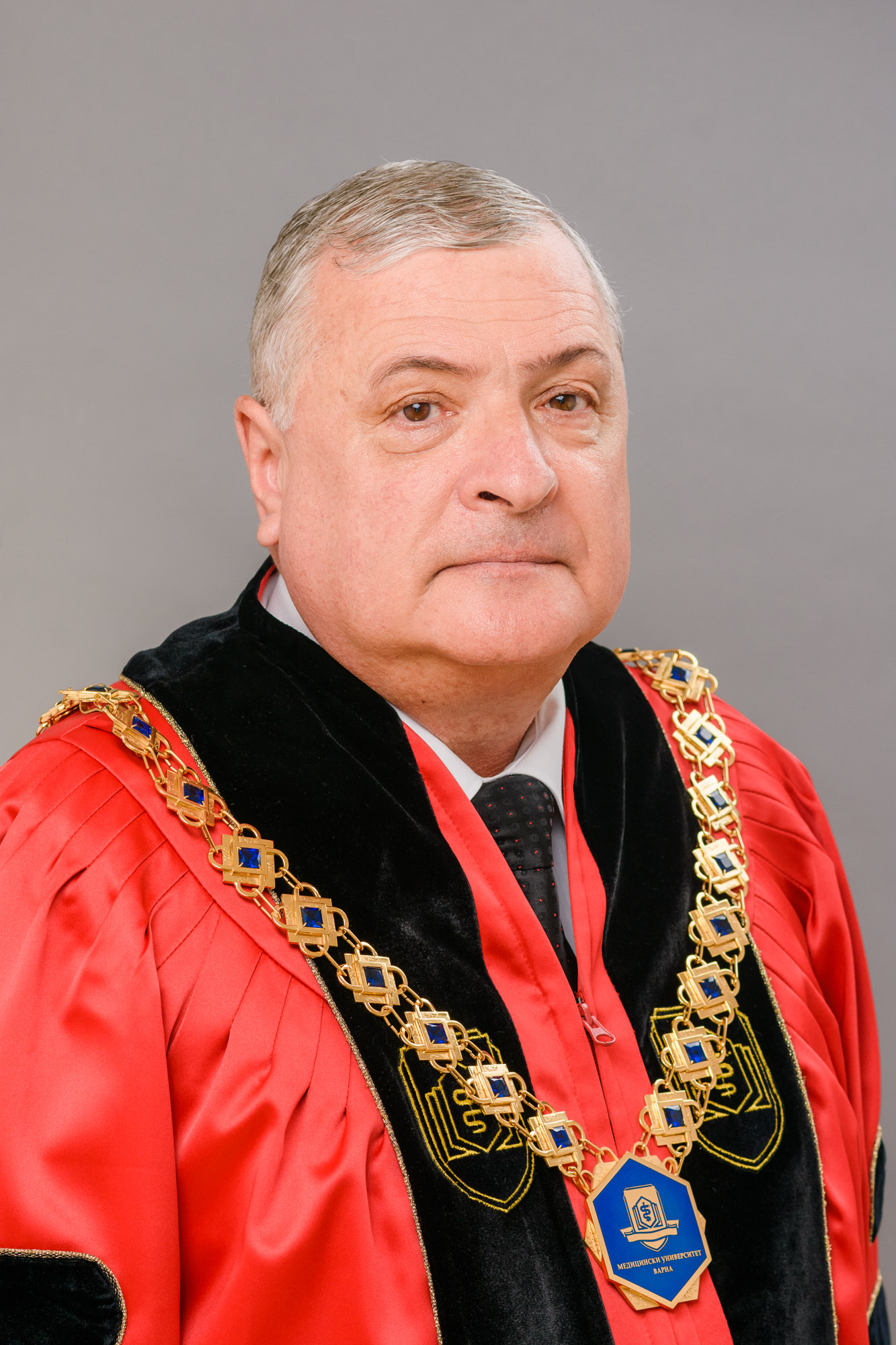
- Born: 1958 (age 67–68); Varna, Bulgaria

Valentin Lyubomirov Ignatov is a Bulgarian surgeon, professor, rector of the Medical University "Prof. Dr. Paraskev Stoyanov" of Varna (2020–2023), and an executive director of St. Marina University Hospital, Varna (2016–2020).

== Biography ==
He was born on June 18, 1958, in Varna and graduated from First Language School in his hometown. He obtained his degree in medicine from the Medical University of Varna (1986).

He has acquired a specialty in surgery (1995), and has a master's degree in Health Management (2005). His PhD thesis (2005) was titled "Diagnostic and Therapeutic Tactics and ND: Laser Therapy in the Conditions of Acute Bleeding from Gastric Duodenal Ulcers”. In 2013 followed the habilitation work “Acute Bleeding from the Gastrointestinal Tract. Diagnostics and Treatment” (2013) and he acquired the academic degree of “Professor” at the Department of General and Operative Surgery (2013).

He was head of the First Clinic of Surgery (2007-2016).

Prof. Ignatov was an executive director of St. Marina University Hospital, Varna from 2016 until 2020, when he was elected rector.

Prof. V. Ignatov is the 13th rector of the Medical University of Varna.

== Scientific Interests ==
He has specialized in the sphere of minimally invasive surgery – endoscopic and laparoscopic, and possesses specific surgical skills in hepatobiliary and pancreatic surgery.

His scientific publications consist of 321 scientific articles, proceedings and notices published in the country and abroad. Forty-eight of them are single-author and 103 are full-text publications. Scientific activity: personal impact factor of 64, cited by 30 foreign and 9 Bulgarian authors. He has co-authored a number of monographs and textbooks: „Surgery", „Emergency Surgery", „Pathologic Physiology". He has written a monograph titled „Acute Bleeding from the Gastrointestinal Tract. Diagnostics and Treatment" (2013).

A number of specialists in endoscopic surgery have been trained under his mentorship.

== Membership in Organizations and Awards ==
Since 2014, Prof. Ignatov has been the president of the Association of University Hospitals.

- He is a member of: Bulgarian Surgical Society (BGSS); Bulgarian Association of Surgeons and Gastroenterologists (BASGO); Professional Organization of Surgeons in Bulgaria; Union of Scientists – Varna branch; European Digestive Surgery; International Association of Surgeons Gastroenterologists and Oncologists (IASGO); International Society of University Colon and Rectal Surgeons (ISUCRS).
- Awards: honorary diploma from the Bulgarian Surgical Society for “Contribution to the Work of BGSS and Active Surgical Work”; „For Support of Donorship in the Republic of Bulgaria in 2019“; „Doctors Whom Bulgarians Trust“ (2018).
