= Ignatów =

Ignatów may refer to:

- Ignatów, Łódź Voivodeship, Poland
- Ignatów, Lublin Voivodeship, Poland
