= Ignatz =

Ignatz is a masculine given name. It may refer to:

== People ==
- Ignatz Bubis (1927–1999), German Jewish leader
- Ignatz Greenberg, birth name of Ukrainian baritone and music teacher Igor Gorin (1904–1982)
- Ignatz Gresser (1835–1919), American Civil War soldier awarded the Medal of Honor
- Ignatz Theodor Griebl (1899–?), German-American physician and head of the German spy network in New York City
- Ignatz Mühlwenzel (c. 1690–1766), Bohemian Jesuit mathematician
- Ignatz Leo Nascher (1863–1944), Austrian-born American doctor who coined the term "geriatrics" in 1909
- Ignatz Lichtenstein (1824–1909), Hungarian Orthodox rabbi who wrote pamphlets advocating conversion to Christianity
- Ignatz Anton Pilát (1820–1870), Austrian-born gardener credited with the landscaping and plants of Central Park, New York City, Chief Gardener and Superintendent of the park
- Ignatz von Popiel (1863–1941), Polish-Ukrainian chess player
- Ignatz Urban (1848–1931), German botanist
- Ignatz Waghalter (1881–1949), Polish-German composer and conductor
- Ignatz Wiemeler (1895–1952), German bookbinder and educator

== Fictional characters ==
- Ignatz Mouse, a central character in the comic strip Krazy Kat
- Ignatz Victor, from the game Fire Emblem: Three Houses

== See also ==
- Ignatz Series, an international comic imprint
- Ignaz, a given name
- Ignatius, a given name
