= 15th federal electoral district of Mexico City =

Federal electoral district of Mexico

Mexico City's 15th
- Electoral district of the Chamber of Deputies of Mexico

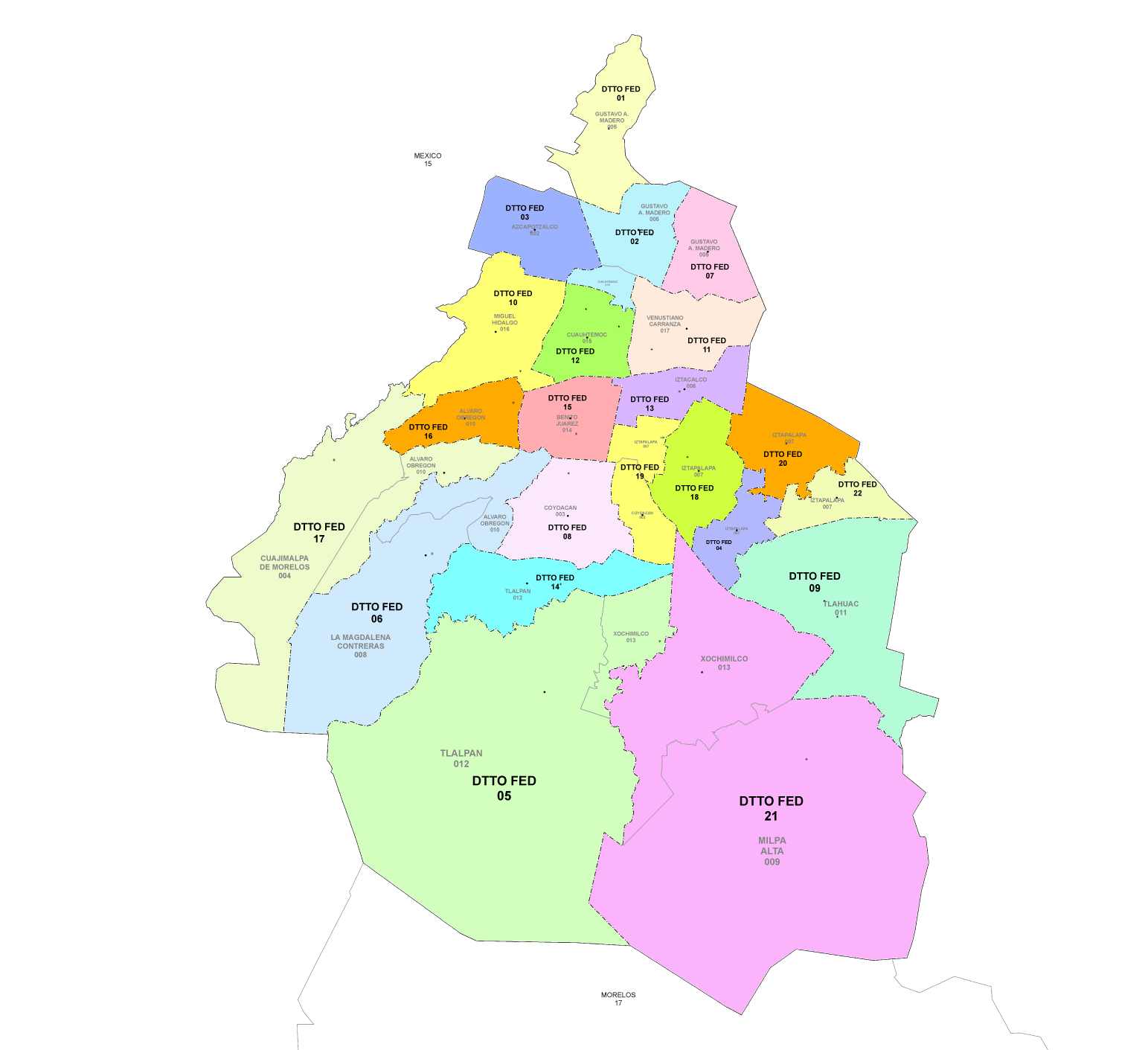
- 15th district since 2023

Incumbent
- Member: Federico Döring
- Party: ▌National Action Party
- Congress: 66th (2024–2027)

District
- State: Mexico City
- Head town: Benito Juárez
- Coordinates: 19°24′06″N 99°09′30″W
- Covers: Benito Juárez
- PR region: Fourth
- Precincts: 254
- Population: 434,153 (2020 census)

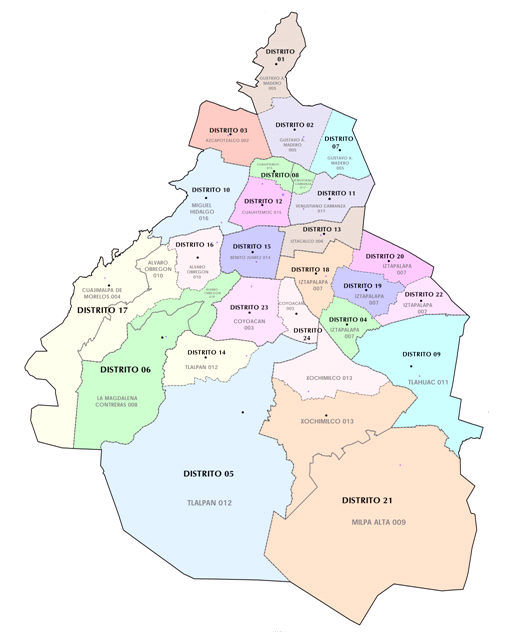
Mexico City under the 2017–2022 districting plan

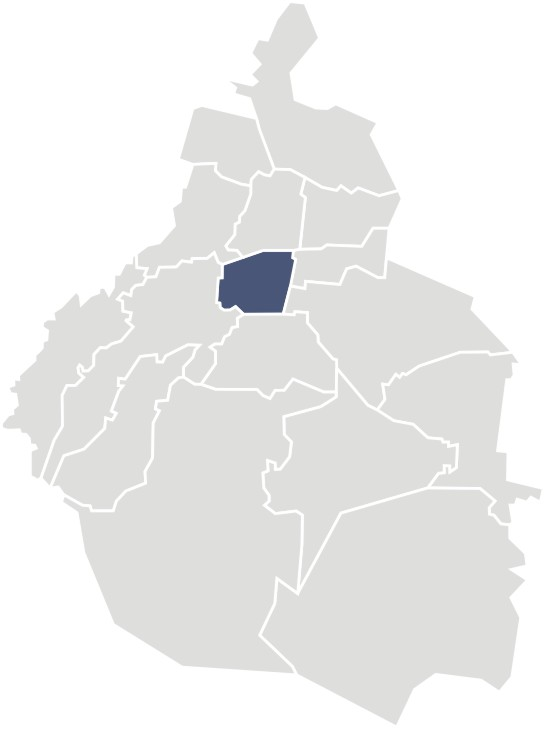
2005–2022 fifteenth district shaded blue

The 15th federal electoral district of Mexico City (Spanish: Distrito electoral federal 15 de la Ciudad de México; prior to 2016, "of the Federal District") is one of the 300 electoral districts into which Mexico is divided for elections to the federal Chamber of Deputies and one of the 22 currently operational districts in Mexico City.

It elects one deputy to the lower house of Congress for each three-year legislative session by means of the first-past-the-post system. Votes cast in the district also count towards the calculation of proportional representation ("plurinominal") deputies elected from the fourth region.

The current member for the district, elected in the 2024 general election, is Federico Döring Casar of the National Action Party (PAN).

== District territory ==
Under the 2023 districting plan adopted by the National Electoral Institute (INE), which is to be used for the 2024, 2027 and 2030 federal elections, the 15th district covers the 254 electoral precincts (secciones electorales) that make up the borough (alcaldía) of Benito Juárez.

The district reported a population of 434,153 in the 2020 census.

== Previous districting schemes ==
Evolution of electoral district numbers
	1974	1978	1996	2005	2017	2023
Mexico City (Federal District)	27	40	30	27	24	22
Chamber of Deputies	196	300				

2017–2022

Between 2017 and 2022 the 15th district covered the whole of the borough (delegación) of Benito Juárez.

2005–2017

Under the 2005 districting scheme, the 15th district covered the whole of the borough of Benito Juárez.

1996–2005

Between 1996 and 2005, the district covered all of the borough of Benito Juárez, with the exception of its easternmost fringe.

1978–1996

The districting scheme in force from 1978 to 1996 was the result of the 1977 electoral reforms, which increased the number of single-member seats in the Chamber of Deputies from 196 to 300. Under that plan, the Federal District's seat allocation rose from 27 to 40. The 15th district covered a portion of the borough of Iztacalco.

== Deputies returned to Congress ==
(Mexico) National parties
- Current
- PAN
- PRI
- PT
- PVEM
- MC
- Morena
- PAZ
- Somos
- Defunct or local only
- PLM
- PNR
- PRM
- PNM
- PP
- PPS
- PARM
- PFCRN
- CON
- PANAL
- PSD
- PES
- PES
- PRD

Mexico City's 15th district
Election	Deputy	Party	Term	Legislature
1922	Froylán C. Manjarrez	Laborist Party (Mexico)	1922–1924	30th Congress
1924	Amílcar Zentella	Laborist Party (Mexico)	1924–1926	31st Congress
1926	José Moreno Salido	Laborist Party (Mexico)	1926–1928	32nd Congress
1928	Gustavo A. Uruchurtu Peralta	Laborist Party (Mexico)	1928–1930	33rd Congress
The 15th district was suspended between 1930 and 1952 (Note: An amendment to Article 52 of the Constitution in 1928 changed the original provision of "one deputy per 60,000 inhabitants" to "one deputy per 100,000"; as a result, the size of the Chamber of Deputies fell from 281 in the 1928 election to 171 in 1934.)
1952	Luis Quintero Gutiérrez	Institutional Revolutionary Party	1952–1955	42nd Congress
1955	Jorge Ayala Ramírez	Institutional Revolutionary Party	1955–1958	43rd Congress
1958	Juan José Osorio Palacios	Institutional Revolutionary Party	1958–1961	44th Congress
1961	Francisco Aguirre Alegría	Institutional Revolutionary Party	1961–1964	45th Congress
1964	Rodolfo Rivera Rueda	Institutional Revolutionary Party	1964–1967	46th Congress
1967	Enrique Bermúdez Olvera	Institutional Revolutionary Party	1967–1970	47th Congress
1970	Roberto Dueñas Ramos	Institutional Revolutionary Party	1970–1973	48th Congress
1973	Luis González Escobar	Institutional Revolutionary Party	1973–1976	49th Congress
1976	Juan José Osorio Palacios	Institutional Revolutionary Party	1976–1979	50th Congress
1979	José Herrera Arango	Institutional Revolutionary Party	1979–1982	51st Congress
1982	Juan José Osorio Palacios	Institutional Revolutionary Party	1982–1985	52nd Congress
1985	Javier Pineda Serino	Institutional Revolutionary Party	1985–1988	53rd Congress
1988	Pedro A. Salazar Muciño	Institutional Revolutionary Party	1988–1991	54th Congress
1991	Armando Lazcano Montoya	Institutional Revolutionary Party	1991–1994	55th Congress
1994	Javier Pineda Serino	Institutional Revolutionary Party	1994–1997	56th Congress
1997	José Espina Von Roehrich	National Action Party (Mexico)	1997–2000	57th Congress
2000	Manuel Minjares Jiménez	National Action Party (Mexico)	2000–2003	58th Congress
2003	Federico Döring Casar	National Action Party (Mexico)	2003–2006	59th Congress
2006	Manuel Minjares Jiménez; Rosaura Virginia Denegre Vaught	National Action Party (Mexico)	2006–2007; 2007–2009	60th Congress
2009	César Nava Vázquez	National Action Party (Mexico)	2009–2012	61st Congress
2012	Jorge Francisco Sotomayor Chávez (Note: Sotomayor Chávez resigned from the PAN on 5 February 2015, saying that it was no longer a "viable option".)	National Action Party (Mexico) Independent politician	2012–2015	62nd Congress
2015	Federico Döring Casar; Óscar David Hernández Morales	National Action Party (Mexico)	2015–2018; 2018	63rd Congress
2018	Luis Mendoza Acevedo	National Action Party (Mexico)	2018–2021	64th Congress
2021	Luis Mendoza Acevedo	National Action Party (Mexico)	2021–2024	65th Congress
2024	Federico Döring Casar	National Action Party (Mexico)	2024–2027	66th Congress

== Presidential elections ==
Mexico City's 15th district
Election	District won by	Party or coalition	%
2018	Andrés Manuel López Obrador	Juntos Haremos Historia	40.4129
2024	Bertha Xóchitl Gálvez Ruiz	Fuerza y Corazón por México	62.6203
