= Federico Döring =

Mexican politician

Federico Döring Casar

Member of the Chamber of Deputies for Federal District′s 15th district
- In office 1 September 2015 – 24 April 2018
- Preceded by: Jorge Francisco Sotomayor
- Succeeded by: Óscar David Hernández
- In office 1 September 2003 – 31 August 2006
- Preceded by: Manuel Minjares Jiménez
- Succeeded by: Manuel Minjares Jiménez

Member of the Senate for the Federal District
- In office 1 September 2006 – 31 August 2012
- Preceded by: Demetrio Sodi de la Tijera
- Succeeded by: Pablo Escudero Morales

Personal details
- Born: 13 March 1971 (age 55) Mexico City
- Party: National Action Party
- Occupation: Politician

Federico Döring Casar (born 13 March 1971) is a Mexican politician from Mexico City affiliated with the National Action Party (PAN). He currently serves as a deputy representing the 15th electoral district of Mexico City in the LXIII Legislature of the Mexican Congress.

== Education ==
Döring received a bachelor's degree in Business Administration from the ITAM.

== Political career ==
In 1995, Döring became an active member of the PAN, and he was a citizen councilor from 1995 to 1999 for the borough of Benito Juárez. From 1997 to 2000, he was the technical secretary of the ALDF's Tourism Commission; during this time, he advised the PAN parliamentary group on political reforms in the Federal District. He also has received three diplomas. In 1995, he received a diploma in Mexican Economy: Analysis and Planning from the Chamber of Deputies; he also has two diplomas from Harvard University.

From 2000 to 2003, Döring served in the II Legislature of the Legislative Assembly of the Federal District. He presided over the Commission of Local Public Administration, served as Secretary of the Budget and Public Accounts Commission, and sat on commissions dealing with tourism and accounting.

From 2003 to 2006, Döring represented Mexico City's 15th district in the Chamber of Deputies during the LIX Legislature. In his first tour of duty in San Lázaro, he was the secretary of two commissions: Communications, and an investigative committee to review public works contracts awarded to Construcciones Prácticas, S.A. de C.V. He also sat on commissions dealing with the Federal District, Budget and Public Accounts, and Special for Investigation of the Institute for the Protection of Bank Savings (IPAB). While in the LIX Legislature, Döring sat on the Regional Directive Committee for the PAN in the Federal District.

In the general election of 2 July 2006, he was elected to the Senate for the PAN, representing the Federal District. In the LX and LXI Legislatures, he was the secretary of the Federal District Commissions and sat on those dealing with Finances and Public Credit; Radio, Television and Film; and Public Security. During this time, he also participated in a political communication seminar at George Washington University.

After his six years in the Senate, Döring returned to the Legislative Assembly of the Federal District, serving in its VI Legislature. He headed up the PAN parliamentary group and sat on five committees, including Science and Technology, Budget and Public Accounts, International Matters, Special Commission on Prisons, and Special Commission for the Political Reform of the Federal District. During his time in the Senate, Döring presented a bill that attempted to regulate Internet content, which drew comparisons to the Stop Online Piracy Act in the United States.

Voters in the 15th federal district returned Döring to the Chamber of Deputies in 2015. He serves on commissions both from the Permanent Commission and from the Chamber of Deputies, as well as those dealing with public safety, urban development, and finances and public credit.

=== Videoscandals ===
In 2004, Döring gave Mexican television presenter Víctor Trujillo a video that was played on Trujillo's news program, in which René Bejarano, previously Andrés Manuel López Obrador's personal secretary, was videotaped accepting US$45,000 in cash from businessman Carlos Ahumada Kurtz. The release of the Bejarano video set off a national political crisis and strained diplomatic relations between Mexico and Cuba.
