= Mario Gallardo =

Cuban-Mexican painter and art critic (born 1937)

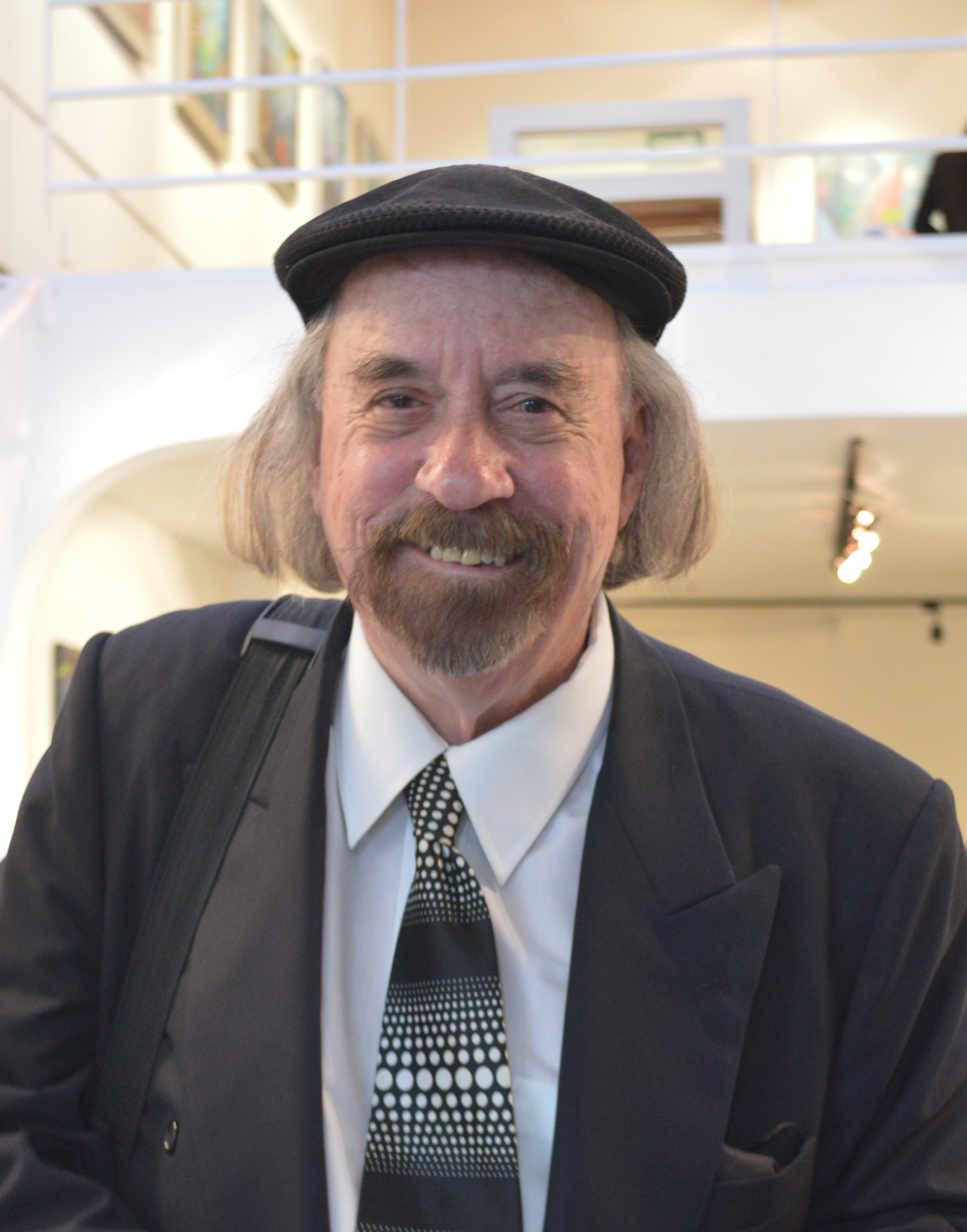
The artist at the opening of Macrocosmismo at the Salón de la Plástica Mexicana

Mario Gallardo (born 1937) is a Cuban-Mexican painter and art critic whose work has been influenced by science fiction. His work has been exhibited individually and collectively in the Americas, Europe, Asia and Africa and has monumental works in Cuba and Mexico. Recognition of his work includes the National Culture Medal of Cuba and membership in the Salón de la Plástica Mexicana.

== Life ==
Also known under the pseudonym Odallag, Gallardo was born and raised in Havana, Cuba. He has lived in Mexico since 1988 and is part of an active Cuban-Mexican art scene in Mexico City, mostly made up of immigrants from Cuba to this country.

== Career ==
Gallardo has made his career primarily as a painter but is also an art critic.

He has had over 85 individual exhibitions and has participated in over 570 collective ones. His work has been shown in 37 countries in the Americas, Europe, Asia and Africa in venues such as the National Museum of Fine Arts of Cuba (1970), the Lalit Kala Akademi in New Delhi (1971), Royal Museum in Warsaw (1975), the Museo de Arte Moderno in Mexico City (1975), Tempere Art Museum in Tempere, Finland (1976), Palace Art Museum in Bucharest (1976), Museum of Modern Art in Cali, Colombia (1976), the Museum of Modern Art in Paris (1978), Spanish Contemporary Art Museum in Madrid (1978), Modern Art Museum in Caracas (1978), Museum of Fine Arts in Budapest (1979), the Tretiakov Gallery in Moscow (1979), Prince Museum in Miyagi (1985), Polyforum Siqueiros (1989), Carlos Mérida National Art Museum in Guatemala (2002), Modern Art Museum in Toluca (2009) and the Tlaxcala Art Museum (2010) .

Gallardo has created a number of notable monumental works such as the glass monument Sol de América, revolución (1979) in Cuba and México, el abrazo eterno (1998) in Mexico City.

His awards include the gold medal at the II Triennial of Contemporary World Art in New Delhi (1971), the bronze medal of the VII Biennial of Graphic Arts in Brno (1976) and the National Culture Medal of Cuba (1983) and the Día de las Américas Prize from the Integración Cultural Latinoamericana in Santiago de Chile. In 2015, the Salón de la Plástica Mexicana, of which his a member, and CONACULTA held a retrospective of his work called Macrocosmismo.

== Artistry ==
His work relies heavily on metaphoric images. He has been a longtime fan of science fiction, which as influenced his artwork, producing his own movement he calls neo-futurism or macrocosmism.
