= Echinocereus llanurensis =

Scientific classification
- Kingdom: Plantae
- Clade: Tracheophytes
- Clade: Angiosperms
- Clade: Eudicots
- Order: Caryophyllales
- Family: Cactaceae
- Subfamily: Cactoideae
- Genus: Echinocereus
- Species: E. llanurensis

Binomial name
- Echinocereus llanurensis (Rutow) W.Blum & D.Felix, 2002

Synonyms
- Echinocereus engelmannii subsp. llanurensis (Rutow) Felger, 1999; Echinocereus nicholii subsp. llanurensis Rutow, 1995 (basionym)

Species of plant

Echinocereus llanurensis is a species of succulent flowering plant in the genus Echinocereus, within the family Cactaceae. It is native to the state of Sonora in northwestern Mexico.

== Description ==
Echinocereus llanurensis is a species of cactus that forms compact clumps of up to 20 cylindrical stems, which may be erect or creeping. These stems can reach approximately 50 cm in length and approximately 6 to 8 cm in diameter. The epidermis is green in color. The root system is fibrous and branched; this species also produces shoots via stolons.

The stems have 11 to 13 slightly-tuberculate ribs, which are 0.5 to 1.2 cm in width and 0.7 to 1 cm in height. The ribs are situated 1 to 2 cm apart. The areoles are rounded and measure 0.4 to 0.6 cm in length and width. They are spaced 1.5 to 2 cm apart.

Growth form

Each areole has 15 to 18 radial spines which measure 1 to 1.5 cm in length. These are white in color, and are adpressed or extended with a rigid, straight form. There are also 6 to 11 central spines, which grow to 1.5 to 5 cm in length. These vary in color from white, yellow, or pink to brown, with a darker tip and a gray tinge with age. These spines are extended, rigid, straight, and flattened. All spines have a superficial covering of trichomes.

Flower

The flower buds are red, pointy, and spiny. The flowers develop on the sides of the stem and are funnel-shaped. They measure 4 to 6 cm in length and 5 to 8.5 cm in diameter. They are red-purple in color, with a darker throat. The petals reach 4 to 5.5 cm in length and 1 to 1.5 cm in width. The floral tube measures 1.3 to 1.7 cm in length and 0.8 to 2.2 cm in diameter, and varies in color from dark green to brown. The ovary measures 1 to 1.5 cm in length and diameter and is green in color, with 10 to 15 white spines measuring 0.5 to 2 cm in length.

Plant in habitat in Guaymas, Sonora, Mexico

The floral nectary measures 5 to 7 mm in length and up to 2 mm in width. The stamens measure 1 to 2 cm in length and are pink-purple to red-purple in color. The anthers and pollen are yellow. The style grows to 3.5 to 4 cm in length and approximately 1.5 mm in diameter and is pink-purple to red-purple in color. The stigma has up to 9 lobes, which measure 0.4 to 0.5 cm in length.

The fruits are round or oval and grow to 2 cm in length and 1.7 cm in diameter. They are green in color with reddish to violet tinges. The pulp is white or colorless. The fruits take 3 to 5 months to develop, and do not split open at maturity. They are unscented, and keep their firmly-attached cushions of spines.

The seeds measure 1.2 to 1.5 mm in length and 0.9 to 1.1 mm in width. They are black in color with a testa perforated with pronounced convex warts. This species is tetraploid, with a chromosome number of 4n = 44.

== Distribution and habitat ==
Echinocereus llanurensis is native to the state of Sonora, in northwestern Mexico. It is mainly found in desert or dry shrubland biomes at elevations of 0 to 300 meters above sea level. It grows on flat coastal hills on rocks and sandy substrates.

== Taxonomy ==
This species was first described as Echinocereus nicholii subsp. llanurensis, a name published in 1995 by the German botanist Jürgen Rutow in the scientific journal Echinocereenfreund 8: 61.

Later, the German botanists Wolfgang Blum and Dieter Felix elevated the taxon to species status, renaming it Echinocereus llanurensis. They registered these changes in the scientific journal Echinocereenfreund 15: 16, publicada en 2002.

Etymology

- Echinocereus: the genus name is derived from the Latin words ĕchīnus (meaning "hedgehog") and cereus (meaning "candle"), in reference to the short, columnar, spiny stems of the plants of this genus.
- llanurensis: The specific epithet refers to the Llanura Costera del Pacífico (Pacific Coastal Plain) in Sonora, Mexico, where this species is found. The Latin suffix -ensis is common in scientific nomenclature to indicate origin or provenance.

== Cultivation ==
This species is cultivated primarily as an ornamental. It may be propagated via seed or cuttings.
