= Hector Zagal =

Mexican philosopher (born 1952)

Héctor Zagal
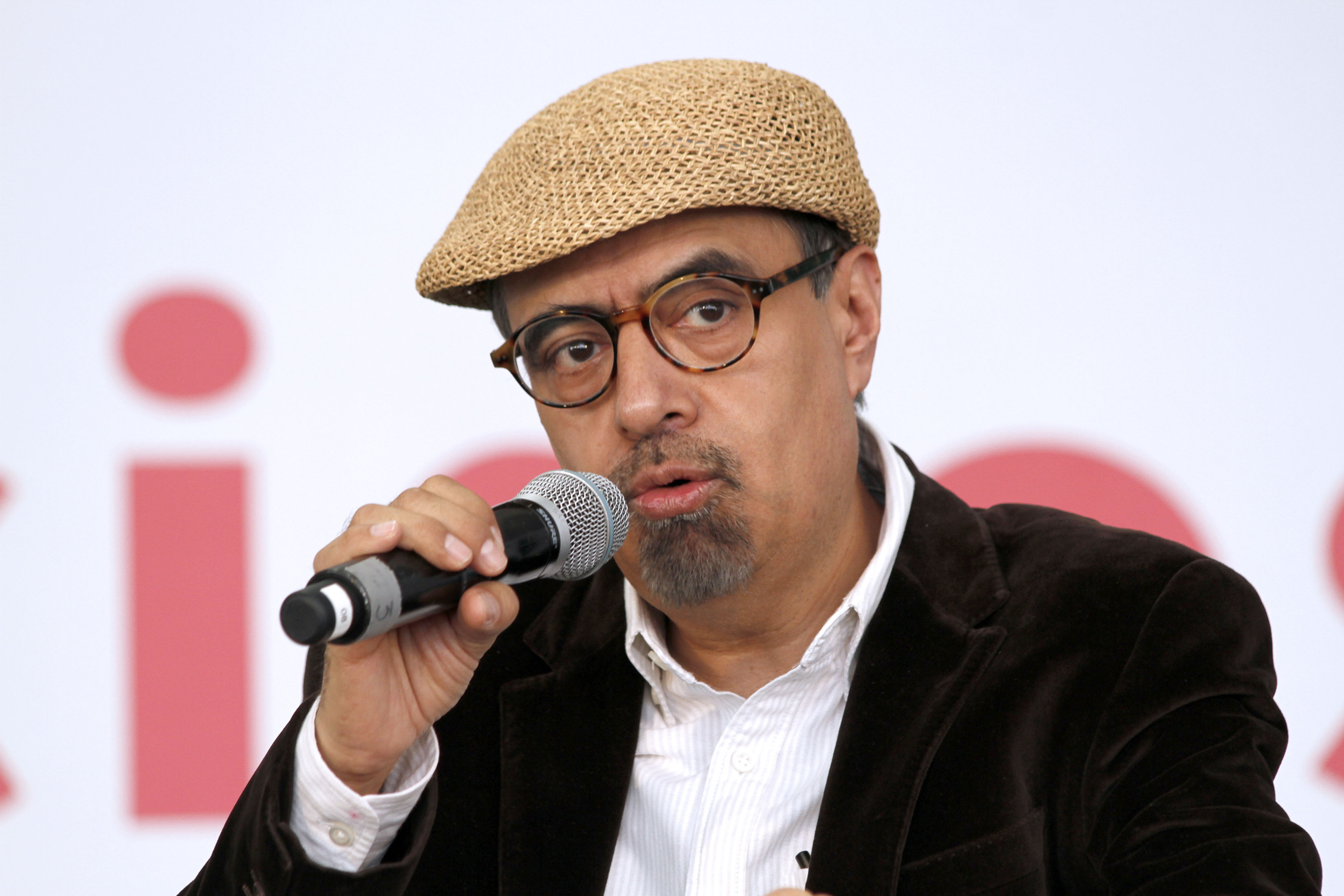
- Born: June 6, 1952 (age 74); Mexico City, Mexico

Philosophical work
- Era: 21st-century philosophy
- Region: Western Philosophy
- School: Aristotelianism, Thomism
- Main interests: Ethics; politics; epistemology; Aristotle; cultural criticism
- Notable ideas: Epistemology of epagogé

Héctor Jesús Zagal Arreguín is a Mexican philosopher, essayist, novelist, and associate member of Opus Dei. As a scholar he specializes in Aristotle.

== Academic career ==
Zagal has written books on ecology, ethics, Aristotle, gastronomy and literature. He obtained a PhD from the Universidad de Navarra, with a dissertation on Aristotle's epagoge and has since then written several articles and books on Aristotle. He has written on several topics of culture, politics, art history and literature. He gained notoriety in the 2006 presidential election, when he wrote two books on two respective candidates.

He is a member of the Mexican Sistema Nacional de Investigadores (National System of Researchers). He has held postdoctoral positions at the University of Notre Dame and the Universidad de Navarra, Spain. He has been an invited speaker at conferences held at several universities in Europe, the United States and Latin America. Apart from his research on philosophy, he has continuously carried out work on the diffusion of the humanities and their application to politics, culture and business.

He is the editor of "Tópicos" (Topics), the philosophy magazine of the Universidad Panamericana. He is a member of the editorial boards of the philosophical magazine Themata (Seville, Spain) and the magazine Logo (of the Spanish Association of Studies on Language, Thought and Classical Culture). He was a member of the committees on Human Sciences and Conduct of the National Science and Technology Council, and a member of the board of directors of the magazine Istmo. Currently he is a member of the reviewing commission of the Institute of Philosophical Research at UNAM.

In 1997 he won the "Raúl Rangel Frías" National Essay Prize" as coauthor with Luis Xavier López-Farjeat of an essay on national identity, which was published under the title "Two aesthetic approximations of national identity". For the occasion of Borges' centenary, he compiled the book "Eight essays on Borges".

== Main publications ==
- La epgaogé en Aristóteles (The epagogé in Aristotle) – doctoral dissertation, a study and reinterpretation of Aristotle's term for induction, written in 1991, supervised by Alejandro Llano.
- Ética para adolescentes posmodernos (ethic for postmodern teenagers) – a high school textbook for the subject of ethics. Translated to German as Ethik für Junge Menschen (Ethics for young men).
- Horismos, syllogismos, asapheia – a book on the problem of obscurity in Aristotle.
- Gula y cultura (Gloutonry and culture): a gastronomical study of universal literature.
- La ciudad d elos Secretos
- Andrés Manuel López Obrador, Historia Política y Personal del Jefe de Gobierno del Distrito Federal (Andres Manuel López Obrador, political history of Mexico City's mayor) – written with Alejandro Trelles (Mexican political scientist). The book is a balanced account of López Obrador when he was the most probable candidate to win the presidency, published a year and a half before the election.
- Anatomía del PRI (Anatomy of the Institutional Revolutionary Party) – also written with Trelles, the book analyzes the major problems that the once-official party has to solve in order to survive.
- He is a frequent contributor to the Mexican newspaper Reforma.

== Affiliations ==
- Presently affiliated with his alma mater, Universidad Panamericana.
- Philosophy professor in ITAM.

== Studies ==
- B.A. in Philosophy Universidad Panamericana
- Master in Philosophy, UNAM
- PhD in philosophy, Universidad de Navarra
- MBA, IPADE

== Public office ==
He worked in the DIF, a dependency of the Mexican federal government during 2007–2008.

== Intellectual positions ==
- In newspaper columns, he has made himself known for comparing ancient Greek culture with present situations or popular culture. - He considers himself a social democrat, as stated in his weblog. - As a writer, he is an open Catholic.
