= Eneko Belausteguigoitia =

Mexican businessman (1933–2025)

- Born: Eneko Belausteguigoitia Arocena; July 12, 1933; Torreón, Coahuila, Mexico
- Died: June 8, 2025 (aged 91); Mérida, Mexico
- Occupations: Businessman and cultural activist

Eneko Belausteguigoitia Arocena (July 12, 1933 – June 8, 2025) was a Mexican businessman, patron and cultural promoter of Basque origin. He served as a founding member of the IPADE Business School (Pan-American Institute of High Management of Business) and co-founder of the E. Arocena Foundation, who established the Arocena Museum in Torreón.

== Early life and education ==
Belausteguigoitia was born on December 7, 1933, into a business family of Basque origin that had settled in the Comarca Lagunera area. He was the son of Francisco Belausteguigoitia Landaluce and Elvira Arocena, as well as the grandson of Rafael Arocena y Arbide, an important Basque farmer who pioneered cotton cultivation in the La Laguna region.

He completed his higher education in Mexico City.

== Career ==
Belausteguigoitia specialized in administration and business. He was part of the group of businessmen who, together with Carlos Llano Cifuentes, Manuel Senderos Irigoyen, Gastón Azcárraga Tamayo, Fernando Casas, José María Basagoiti, among others, founded the IPADE Business School (Pan-American Institute of High Management of Business) in 1967, forming part of the first class of this prestigious business school in Mexico.

For more than five decades, he participated in various industries and held management positions in multiple companies, among which he stood out as president of Grupo Beta San Miguel, one of the largest sugar conglomerates in Mexico. He was also president of the Board of Trustees of the Colegio de las Vizcaínas, an educational institution founded by the Basque diaspora in the 18th century.

As part of his work as a cultural promoter, he established the E. Arocena Foundation together with José Pinto Mazal and Gustavo Díaz de León Hernández, who undertook a museum project at the end of the 20th century, which led to the opening of the Arocena Museum on August 27, 2006, in the building of the former Casino de La Laguna, in the Historic Center of Torreón. This building houses a collection of 2,000 pieces of art that are part of the city's cultural heritage.

== Personal life and death ==
Belausteguigoitia died on June 8, 2025, in Mérida, Yucatán, a city where he lived the last years of his life. He was 91, and was survived by his sisters Ibone, a diver who represented Mexico at the 1948 London Olympics and Bibiñe, the first woman to win the title of Basque Country Tennis Champion.
