= Eneko =

Eneko may refer to:

- Eneko (given name), a Basque masculine given name
- Eneko (Eberron), a fictional creature in the World of Eberron
- The Japanese name for Skitty, a fictional creature in the Pokémon franchise
