= Guaymas Municipality =

Coordinates: 27.9183°N 110.8933°W

Guaymas
- Municipality
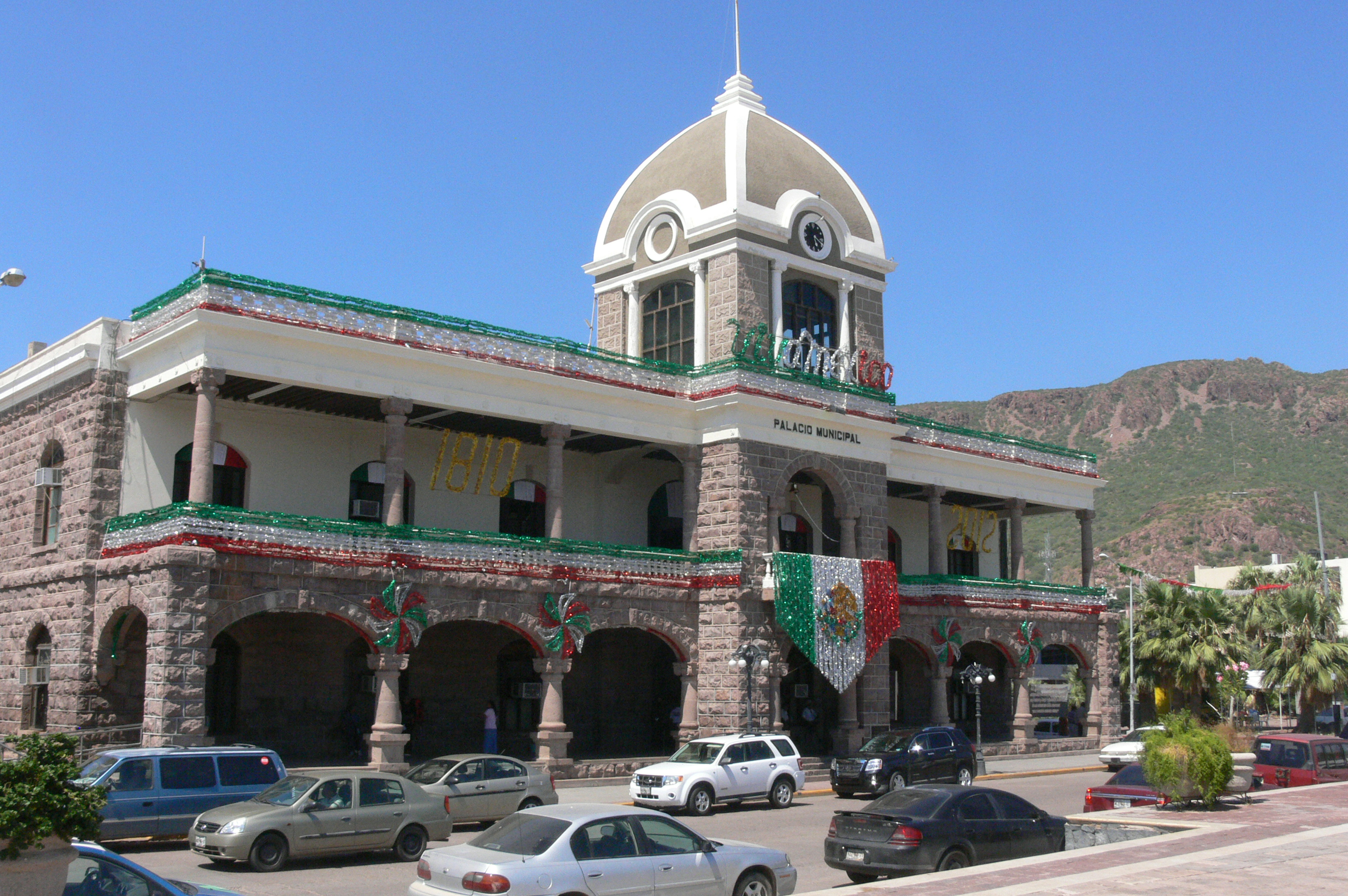
- Town hall

- Coat of arms

- Location of the municipality in Sonora
- Country: Mexico
- State: Sonora
- Municipal seat: Guaymas

Population (2015)
  - Total: 158,046
- Time zone: UTC–07:00 (Zona Pacífico)
- Area code: +52 622
- Website: guaymas.gob.mx

Guaymas is a municipality in the state of Sonora in north-western Mexico. In 2015, the municipality had a total population of 158,046. The municipal seat is the city of Guaymas.

== Government ==
=== Municipal rulers ===
Term	Ruler	Political party	Office	Spouse
1825-1826	Bonifacio Basozábal		Municipal president	Balvaneda Luján Fontes
1826-1827	Mateo Uruchurtu Eugurlude		Municipal president	Dolores Díaz Gámez
1827-1828	Juan García Aravi		Municipal president	Mariana Sosa
1828-1829	André Desse		Municipal president	
1832-1833	Liberato Ortiz de la Torre		Justice of the Peace	Balvaneda Araiza
1833-1834	Thomas Spence Suther		Justice of the Peace	María de la Luz Valenzuela y Sosa
1834-1835	Santiago Campillo Gallardo		Justice of the Peace	María Díaz
1835-1836	Manuel Rodríguez Yñigo-Ruiz		Justice of the Peace	Elena Bustamante Encinas
1836-1837	Manuel Paredes		Justice of the Peace	María de la Luz Velasco
1837-1839	José S. Iglesias		Justice of the Peace	
1839-1840	Cosme de Echevarría		Justice of the Peace	María Mazón
1840-1842	Pedro Félix		Justice of the Peace	
1842-1843	Joaquín Loustaunau García		Justice of the Peace	Josefa Andrade Félix
1843-1844	Bartolomé de Arce		Justice of the Peace	
1844-1845	José Pesqueira Bustamante		Justice of the Peace	María López
1845-1846	Thomas Spence Suther		Municipal president	María de la Luz Valenzuela y Sosa
1846-1848	José Sandoval Urrea		Municipal president	Anna Ortiz Velasco
1848-1851	Cayetano Navarro Fontes		District prefect	Trinidad Montijo Carpena
1851-1852	Juan Saavedra		Municipal president	Josefa Molina
1852-1854	Francisco Irigoyen García Noriega		Municipal president	Dolores Orcí Méndez
1855-1856	Antonio Campuzano		Municipal president	Josefa Noriega
1856-1856	Juan Basozábal Luján		Municipal president	Magdalena Díaz
1856-1857	José Pesqueira Bustamante		Municipal president	María López
1857-1858	Fernando Cubillas Yñigo-Ruiz		Municipal president	Dolores Loustaunau Andrade
1858-1860	Tomás Robinson Ybarra		Municipal president	María Dolores Yruretagoyena Yñigo-Ruiz
1860-1861	Jesús E. Nuño		District prefect	
1861-1863	Ignacio Castro Bernal		Municipal president	Adelaida Loustaunau Andrade
1863-1864	Casimiro Hugues De Anza		Municipal president	Juana Bojórquez López de Jerez
1864-1865	Tomás Robinson Ybarra		District prefect	María Dolores Yruretagoyena Yñigo-Ruiz
1865-1866	Santiago Campillo Landavazo		Imperial prefect	Carmen Centeno Campillo
1866-1867	Jesús Leyva		Municipal president	Tomasa Jordán
1867-1870	Próspero Salazar Bustamante		District prefect	Gumersinda Álvarez
1870-1875	Wenceslao Martínez		District prefect	Dominga Molina
1874-1875	Juan Alfredo Robinson Ybarra		Municipal president	Ángela Figueroa Castelo
1875-1876	Tomás Spence y Valenzuela		Municipal president	Carmen García Araví Sosa
1876-1877	Plutarco Elías Lucero		Municipal president	María Jesús Campuzano Noriega
1877-1879	Cirilo Ramírez		Municipal president	Elisa Washington
1879-1882	Ricardo Carricarte		District prefect	
1882-1883	Gabriel Corella Quiroga		Municipal president	Genoveva Rubio Escobosa
1883-1884	Fernando Astiazarán Yñigo-Ruiz		Municipal president	Dolores Gándara de Aguilar
1884-1885	Eduardo Gaxiola Gil Lamadrid		Municipal president	Catalina Gayou Ortiz de la Torre
1885-1886	José Andrés Rivero		District prefect	Amparo Ramis Forjas
1886-1889	Francisco Seldner		Municipal president	Polina Marcor Basozábal
16/09/1889-11/06/1890	Flacro Quijano		Municipal president	Clotilde Sánchez
11/06/1890-15/09/1897	Prisciliano Figueroa		Municipal president	
16/09/1897-15/09/1899	Fernando Montijo Bustamante		Municipal president	Elvira Hugues Encinas
16/09/1899-04/05/1900	Rodolfo F. Nieto		Municipal president	Rosa Viosca
05/05/1900-01/10/1900	Luis Antonio Martínez Pesqueira		Municipal president	María Amparo Bustamante Goerlitz
02/10/1900-24/05/1902	Rodolfo F. Nieto		Municipal president	Rosa Vosca
25/05/1902-26/09/1902	Fernando Montijo Bustamante		Municipal president	Elvira Hugues Encinas
27/09/1902-15/09/1904	Eduardo Gaxiola Gil Lamadrid		Municipal president	Catalina Gayou Ortiz de la Torre
16/09/1904-22/04/1905	Francisco Fourcade Peridier		Municipal president	Maria Jesús Maytorena Pesqueira
22/04/1905-16/06/1905	Juan Zenizo Schacfino		Municipal president	Ignacia Rivera Martínez
17/06/1905-15/09/1905	José María Maytorena Arana		Municipal president	María Luebbert Díaz
16/09/1905-15/09/1906	Arturo Morales Monge		Municipal president	Luisa Camou Camou
16/09/1906-15/09/1907	Antonio García		Municipal president	
16/09/1907-18/04/1909	Arturo Morales Monge		Municipal president	Luisa Camou Camou
19/04/1909-15/09/1910	Carlos F. Gutiérrez		Municipal president	Francisca Robinson Figueroa
16/09/1910-15/09/1911	Carlos F. Gutiérrez		Municipal president	Francisca Robinson Figueroa
16/09/1911-15/09/1912	Guillermo Escalante Tapia		Municipal president	Carmen Maytorena Pesqueira
16/09/1912-13/05/1913	Matías Alzúa Fregoza		Municipal president	Isidora Bernal
23/05/1913-17/07/1914	Miguel Moreto Cruz		District prefect	
13/05/1913-02/06/1914	Gilberto Almada Torres		Municipal president	María Bastón Munguía
2/06/1914-13/07/1914	Luis Gontrán Iberri Carpena		Municipal president	Josefina Bringas Duarte
14/07/1914-20/07/1914	Guillermo Escalante Tapia		Municipal president	Carmen Maytorena Pesqueira
21/07/1914-19/12/1914	Matías Alzúa Fregoza		Municipal president	Isidora Bernal
20/12/1914-15/09/1915	Agustín A. Roa Sierra		Municipal president	Concepción Bustamante Santacruz
16/09/1915-11/08/1916	Rafael Cruz		Municipal president	
12/08/1916-01/10/1916	Ramón Gil Samaniego		Municipal president	
2/10/1916-13/10/1916	Carlos Félix Rubio		Municipal president	Mercedes Espriú Oceguera
14/10/1916-11/02/1917	Francisco Ramonet Cuen		Municipal president	Sofía Führken Crespo
12/02/1917-08/03/1917	Loreto Valenzuela		Municipal president	
09/03/1917-29/12/1917	Carlos Félix Rubio		Municipal president	Mercedes Espriú Oceguera
30/12/1917-15/09/1918	Cayetano Navarro León		Municipal president	Luz Girón Lemas
16/09/1918-15/09/1919	Loreto Valenzuela		Municipal president	
16/09/1919-22/12/1919	Severiano Parra Morales		Municipal president	Josefa García Herreros Corrales
22/12/1919-02/01/1920	Manuel Gómez Muñiz		Municipal president	Francisca Orduño Vidal
02/01/1920-11/03/1920	Severiano Parra Morales		Municipal president	Josefa García Herreros Corrales
12/03/1920-15/09/1920	Loreto Valenzuela		Municipal president	
16/09/1921-15/09/1922	Francisco Barrera Gutiérrez		Municipal president	Cornelia Gutiérrez
16/09/1922-15/09/1923	Rodolfo Garayzar		Municipal president	
16/09/1923-15/09/1924	Francisco Barrera Gutiérrez		Municipal president	Cornelia Gutiérrez
16/09/1924-15/09/1925	Carlos Dávila Zayas		Municipal president	María Monteverde Duarte
16/09/1925-24/03/1926	Francisco Flores		Municipal president	
24/03/1926-15/09/1926	Ángel Murillo Retamosa		Municipal president	Cindirila Arnold Encinas
16/09/1926-15/03/1927	Ismael F. Pereyra		Municipal president	
16/03/1927-15/09/1927	Antonio Sanders Córdoba		Municipal president	
16/09/1927-07/10/1927	Rodolfo Garayzar		Municipal president	
07/10/1927-15/09/1928	Francisco Barrera Gutiérrez		Municipal president	Cornelia Gutiérrez
16/09/1928-10/05/1929	Severiano Parra Morales	PNR	Municipal president	Josefa García Herreros Corrales
11/05/1929-11/05/1929	Guillermo Escalante Tapia	PNR	Municipal president	Carmen Maytorena Pesqueira
12/05/1929-05/03/1930	Fernando Campillo Galaz	PNR	Municipal president	Rosaura Vega Almada
06/03/1930-15/09/1931	Ramón Gil Samaniego	PNR	Municipal president	
16/09/1931-15/09/1932	Prisciliano V. Dueñas	PNR	Municipal president	
16/09/1932-15/09/1933	Enrique Aguayo Espriú	PNR	Municipal president	Aurora Gayou Leetch
16/09/1933-15/09/1935	Francisco L. Llano Amaya		Municipal president	Guadalupe Zaragoza Maytorena
16/09/1935-19/01/1937	José Ríos Ríos	PNR	Municipal president	María Jesús Gutiérrez Valenzuela
19/01/1937-15/09/1937	Vicente Sanders Córdoba	PNR	President of the Municipal Council	
16/09/1937-15/09/1939	Leopoldo Ulloa	PNR; PRM	Municipal president	Belén Nogales
16/09/1939-15/09/1941	Francisco Landavazo Encinas	PRM	Municipal president	
16/09/1941-13/03/1942	Francisco Barrera Gutiérrez	PRM	Municipal president	Cornelia Gutiérrez
13/03/1942-15/09/1943	Modesto Valle	PRM	Municipal president	Guillermina Pedroza
16/09/1943-15/09/1946	Carlos Guillermo Randall Cáñez	PRM; PRI	Municipal president	Guadalupe Vera Cota
16/09/1946-18/06/1948	Francisco Fourcade Maytorena		Municipal president	María Ester Harispuru Martínez
18/06/1948-29/10/1948	Salvador M. Salazar	PRI	Municipal president	Demetria Nieblas
29/10/1948-14/06/1949	Miguel N. Martínez	PRI	Municipal president	
14/06/1949-15/09/1949	Juan José Díaz Ferreira	PRI	Municipal president	Rosa Vielledent Cota
16/09/1949-15/09/1952	José María Ramonet Cuen	PRI	Municipal president	Natalia Valdez de la Portilla
16/09/1952-15/09/1955	Florencio Zaragoza Maytorena	PRI	Municipal president	Rosa María Peralta Figueroa
16/09/1955-15/09/1958	Hilario Téllez Ruiz Esparza	PRI	Municipal president	Consuelo Durazo Molina
16/09/1958-15/09/1961	Juan Yñigo Johnson	PRI	Municipal president	María Luisa Corral Canalizo
16/09/1961-15/09/1964	José Martínez Bernal	PRI	Municipal president	Virginia Robinson Robinson
16/09/1964-15/09/1967	Enrique Ramonet Valdez	PRI	Municipal president	Yolanda Bravo
16/09/1967-15/09/1970	Óscar Ruiz Almeida	PRI	Municipal president	Catalina Kuraica
16/09/1970-15/09/1973	Gaspar Zaragoza Iberri	PRI	Municipal president	Elsa Gaxiola Clouthier
16/09/1973-15/09/1976	Felipe Bárcenas Santini	PRI	Municipal president	María Salido Morales
16/09/1976-15/09/1979	Óscar Ulloa Nogales	PRI	Municipal president	Guillermina Cadena
16/09/1979-15/09/1982	Enrique Clausen Bustillos	PRI	Municipal president	Alicia Iberri Márquez
16/09/1982-15/09/1985	Marco Antonio Llano Zaragoza	PRI	Municipal president	Zulma Vielledent Ibarra
16/09/1985-15/09/1988	Marco Antonio Córdova Campa	PRI	Municipal president	Guadalupe Cabrera Muñoz
16/09/1988-15/09/1991	Florentino López Tapia	PRI	Municipal president	Olga León
16/09/1991-13/10/1994	Felipe de Jesús Rivadeneira y Sauri	PRI	President of the Municipal Council	Julieta Pérez Villalobos
13/10/1994-15/09/1997	Edmundo Chávez Méndez	PRI	Municipal president	Míriam Tellechea
16/09/1997-29/04/1999	Sara Valle Dessens	PRD	Municipal president. She applied for a temporary leave	Joel Mendoza
30/04/1999-15/09/2000	Pascual Rodríguez	PRD	Acting municipal president	Alicia González
16/09/2000-15/09/2003	Bernardino Cruz Rivas	PAN	Municipal president	Inés Aída Pacheco
16/09/2003-12/03/2006	Carlos Ernesto Zataráin González	PRI	Municipal president	Judith Nungaray Beltrán
13/03/2006-15/09/2006	Jorge Luis Espada Trapero	PRI	Acting municipal president	Raquel Cortés Murillo
16/09/2006-18/03/2009	Antonio Astiazarán Gutiérrez	PRI	Municipal president. He applied for a temporary leave	Patricia Ruibal
19/03/2009-15/09/2009	Susana Corella Platt	PRI	Acting municipal president	Carlos M. Espriú Murillo
16/09/2009-05/03/2012	César Adrián Lizárraga Hernández	PAN	Municipal president. He applied for a temporary leave	Consuelo Albáñez
06/03/2012-15/09/2012	Mónica Marín Martínez	PAN	Acting municipal president	Ricardo A. Murillo Tostado
16/09/2012-15/09/2015	Otto Guillermo Claussen Iberri	PRI	Municipal president	Ana Sofía Rubio
16/09/2015-15/09/2018	Lorenzo de Cima Dworak	PAN	Municipal president	Ángeles Salido de De Cima
16/09/2018-15/09/2021	Sara Valle Dessens	Morena; PT; PES; Coalition "Together We Will Make History"	Municipal president	
16/09/2021-15/09/2024	Karla Córdova González	Morena	Municipal president	
16/09/2024-	Karla Córdova González	Morena; PVEM; PT; PNA Sonora; PES Sonora	Municipal president. She was reelected	
