= Inigo =

Inigo / Iñigo
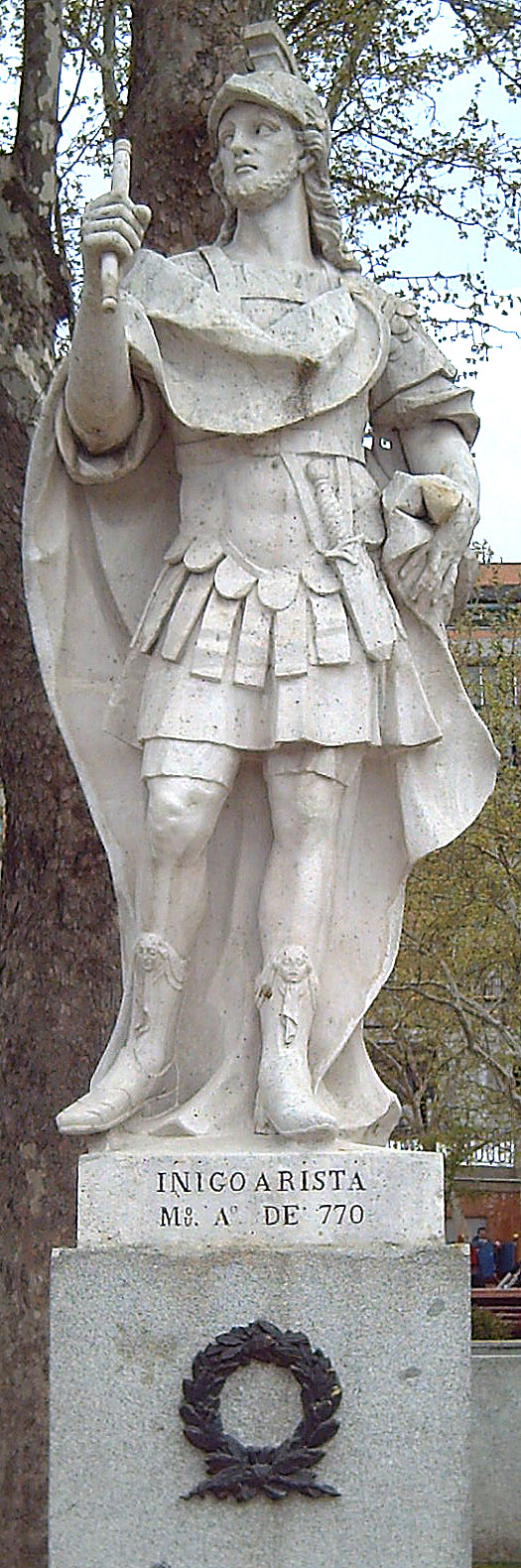
- Íñigo Arista of Pamplona
- Gender: Male

Origin
- Origin: Basque

Other names
- Derived: Basque Eneko, ene- "mine", -ko (hypocoristic) "my little (love/dear)"
- Related names: Eneko, Iñaki, Ignatius, Yñigo

Inigo is a masculine given name deriving from the Castilian rendering (Íñigo) of the medieval Basque name Eneko. Ultimately, the name means "my little (man)". While mostly seen among the Iberian diaspora, it also gained a limited popularity in the United Kingdom.

Early traces of the name Eneko go back to Roman times, when the Bronze of Ascoli included the name forms Enneges and Ennegenses among a list of Iberian horsemen granted Roman citizenship in 89 B.C.E. In the early Middle Ages, the name appears in Latin, as Enneco, and Arabic, as Wannaqo (ونقه) in reports of Íñigo Arista (c. 790–851 or 852), a Basque who ruled Pamplona. It can be compared with its feminine form, Oneca. It was frequently represented in medieval documents as Ignatius (Spanish "Ignacio"), which is thought to be etymologically distinct, coming from the Roman name Egnatius, from Latin ignotus, meaning "unknowing", or from the Latin word for fire, ignis. The familiar Ignatius may simply have served as a convenient substitution when representing the unfamiliar Íñigo/Eneko in scribal Latin.

== People ==
=== Athletes ===
- Iñigo Calderón (born 1982), Spanish Basque footballer who played at Brighton and Hove Albion
- Iñigo Córdoba (born 1997), Spanish Basque footballer
- Íñigo Cuesta (born 1969), Spanish Basque cyclist
- Iñigo Díaz de Cerio (born 1984), Spanish Basque footballer, currently playing for CD Mirandés
- Íñigo Eguaras (born 1992), Spanish Navarrese footballer
- Iñigo Idiakez (born 1973), Spanish Basque footballer who played for Real Sociedad
- Iñigo Martínez (born 1991), Spanish Basque footballer who played for Athletic Bilbao
- Iñigo Monreal (born 1974), Spanish Basque athlete
- Iñigo Landaluze (born 1977), Spanish Basque cyclist
- Iñigo Larrainzar (born 1971), Spanish Basque footballer
- Iñigo Pérez (born 1987), Spanish Navarrese footballer, currently playing for Athletic Bilbao
- Iñigo Ruiz de Galarreta (born 1993), Spanish Basque footballer, currently playing for Athletic Bilbao
- Iñigo Vélez (born 1982), Spanish Basque footballer, currently playing for Xerez CD

=== Religious figures and saints ===
- Íñigo López de Loyola, Saint Ignatius of Loyola (1491–1556), Spanish Basque priest, theologian and saint, founder of the Society of Jesus
- Íñigo of Oña (Ignatius, Enecus) (d. 1057), Castilian abbot and saint
- Íñigo López de Mendoza y Zúñiga (1476–1535), Castilian clergyman and diplomat, Archbishop of Burgos
- Fray Íñigo Abbad y Lasierra (1745–1813), Spanish monk and the first to document Puerto Rico's history

=== Nobles ===
- Íñigo Arista of Pamplona (died 852), king of Pamplona
- Íñigo Fernández de Velasco, 2nd Duke of Frías (1462–1528), Spanish grandee and military leader
- Íñigo López (floruit 1040–1076), first Lord of Biscay
- Íñigo López de Mendoza, 4th Duke of the Infantado
- Íñigo Vélez de Guevara (disambiguation), three members of a Spanish noble family from the 17th century

=== Politicians ===
- Íñigo Errejón (born 1983), Spanish political scientist and politician
- Iñigo Urkullu (born 1961), lehendakari of the Basque Government
- Íñigo Méndez de Vigo (born 1956), Spanish politician

=== Other ===
- Íñigo López de Mendoza, 1st Marquis of Santillana (1398–1458), Castilian poet
- Inigo Campioni (1878–1944), Italian admiral
- Inigo Gallo (1932–2000), Swiss comedian and actor
- Inigo Jackson (1933–2001), British actor
- Inigo Jones (1573–1652), British architect
- Inigo Owen Jones (1872–1954), British meteorologist
- Iñigo Manglano-Ovalle (born 1961), American artist and MacArthur Fellow
- Inigo Philbrick (born 1987/1988), American art dealer and convicted fraudster
- Inigo Triggs (1876–1923), British garden designer and author

== Fictional characters ==
- Inigo Balboa, narrator of the Capitan Alatriste novels
- Inigo Jollifant, a piano player in The Good Companions, by J. B. Priestley
- Inigo Montoya, a swordsman in The Princess Bride
- Inigo Pipkin, a puppet maker in Pipkins
- Inigo Skimmer, a clerk in The Fifth Elephant by Terry Pratchett
- Inigo Upcott, character in the novel The Ink Black Heart

== As surname ==
- José María Íñigo (1942–2018), Spanish journalist and television presenter

== See also ==
- Indigo (given name)
- Ignatius
- Ignacio
