= Yñigo =

Origin
- Meaning: Eneko
- Region of origin: Basque

Other names
- Variant forms: Yeniego, Yenigo, Yeniguez, Ynigo, Ynyéguez, Yñiguez e Yñiquiz

Yñigo is a surname of Basque origin in Eneko (Ennekwo), found primarily in the Basque region of Spain and France. This word may refer to:

== Origin ==
The last name Yñigo (or Iñigo) has its origins in the Basque Country.

=== Meaning ===
Usually surnames were originated in the Basque Country as name of houses, being families known by the name of the house they inhabited once. Yñigo was originally spelled Eneko and evolved from the Basque words ene, which means 'my', and ko, which means 'little'. Therefore, Yñigo means 'my little (love/dear)'.

== Variation ==
Confusion has arisen through changes over time. Eneko or Enneco change to: Einygo, lamented, Endego, Enec, Eneco, Eneg, Enego, Enegot, Éneq, Enyego, Enyeguez, Enyégues, Ennego, Ennygo, Eynigo, Henego, Henneco, Inego, Inigo, Innago, Iñaki, Iñigo, Iniguez, Íñiquiz, Migo, Ñiguez, Yeniego, Yenigo, Yeniguez, Ynigo, Ynyéguez, Ýñigo, Yñigo, Yniguez and Yñiquiz. These variants are disseminated throughout the Hispanic world.

Siglo I a. C.	Siglo VIII d. C.	Siglo IX	Siglo X	Siglo XI	Siglo XII	Siglo XIII	Siglo XIV	Siglo XV	Siglo XVI
Enneges									
	Enneco	Enneco	Enneco	Enneco	Enneco	Enneco			
		Eneco	Eneco	Eneco	Eneco	Eneco	Eneco	Eneco	Eneco
			Ennecho 968		Enecho	Enechot 1211	Ennecot 1330		Enecot
			Enecco 959		Enneko				
				Eneko 1062	Enecone 1187	Ennecus 1277			
					Enequo	Enequo	Enequo		
							Nequo 1366		
					Enego	Enego			
						Ennego	Eynnego 1330		
				Onneko 1067					
				Genneko 1072					
				Genneco 1080					
				Jenneco					
				Jenneko 1079		Jenego			
						Yenego	Yenego		
							Yennego		
							Yeneguo		
							Yniego 1312	Ynigo 1475	
							Hyniego 1351		
							Ynego 1330		
							Yenigo 1366		
						Ienego	Ienego		
						Iennego 1286			
						Ieneqo 1290			
				Íñigo	Íñigo	Íñigo	Íñigo	Íñigo	Íñigo

== Coat of arms and nobility ==
Over the centuries, there have been many different coat of arms associated with this surname. At the "Consejo Real de Navarra", "Real Chancillería de Granada", "Real Chancillería de Valladolid", "Real Compañía de Guardias Marinas", "Real Audiencia de Oviedo" and in the following orders "Order of Alcantara", "Order of Calatrava", "Order of Charles III", "Order of Montesa", "Order of Saint Lazarus" and "Order of Santiago" there are different records for this surname amongst other "Expedientes de Hidalguía" held in their archive. Which are open for public use, genealogists and family historians.

== People ==
Yñigo is a surname of Basque origin.

- Lope Yñigo (1969), Mexican land tenure
