= Panamerican University =

Mexican university in Mexico City

Coordinates: 19.3746°N 99.1837°W

- Universidad Panamericana
- Motto: Ubi spiritus, libertas
- Motto in English: "Where the spirit is, there is freedom"
- Type: Private research university
- Established: 1967
- Founder: Carlos Llano Cifuentes
- Religious affiliation: Roman Catholic (Opus Dei)
- Rector: Fernanda Llergo Bay
- Undergraduates: 11,341 (2022)
- Postgraduates: 4,128 (2022)
- Location: Mexico City, Guadalajara, and Aguascalientes, Mexico
- Campus: Urban
- Colors: Golden, Red and Blue
- Website: www.up.edu.mx/en

Panamerican University (Spanish: Universidad Panamericana), commonly known as UP, is a private research, Roman Catholic university founded in Mexico City. It has four campuses: the main Mixcoac campus in Benito Juarez borough of south-western Mexico City, founded in 1968; the Guadalajara campus established in 1981; the Aguascalientes campus established in 1989; and Campus Santa Fe, also in Mexico City, founded in 2011. One of the most prestigious universities in Mexico, it on is currently ranked 4th best university in Mexico and the 1st university for philosophy in Latin America, by QS World University Rankings and has a 4 star rating.

== History ==
The university was founded in 1967 as a business school, when a group of wealthy and devout catholic businessmen and academics, inspired by the University of Navarra and University of Salamanca, created the Instituto Panamericano de Alta Dirección de Empresas (English: Panamerican Institute for Executive Business Management), also known as IPADE. Soon after, they promoted the creation of a university. As a result, the Instituto Panamericano de Humanidades (Panamerican Institute of Humanities), founded in 1968, merged with the IPADE and created the Panamerican University. It was all done under the spiritual direction of Opus Dei, a personal prelature of the Catholic Church.

Carlos Llano Cifuentes, a Mexican philosopher who had ties with Opus Dei, is often named the 'father of the university' because of his longstanding involvement in the conception of the institute.

In 1978, the IPH was given University rank and took the name Universidad Panamericana, even though the IPADE and IPH conceived from their origins the universal and unitarian knowledge.

The new university began with only two programs, Pedagogy and Administration. During the 1970s new programs were added, including Law and Philosophy (1970), Economics and Business Administration (1977), and Industrial Engineering (1978). Further new programs were added in the 1980s and 1990s, including Electromechanic Engineering, Accountancy (1981), Informatics, Marketing, International Business, Finance (1993), and Medicine (1996).

=== Motto and coat of arms ===
Ubi spiritus, libertas (Where the spirit is, there is freedom) is the university's motto, synthesizing the educational philosophy. Love of freedom in a space where the human spirit is cultivated—love of authentic freedom.

The university's arms is formed by two elements: The red square and the blue band on the golden left side, which represent the coat of arms used by Christopher Columbus when he landed in the Americas; they symbolize Pan-Americanism.

On the right side, on top of a golden bottom, there's an Oak, symbol of strength. Its roots are the diverse sources of integral development; the four ramifications symbolize the Cardinal Virtues: Prudence, Justice, Fortitude and Temperance; the leaves and acorns represent the rest of the virtues, which derive of the fundamental four.

== Schools and faculties ==
Currently, the university offers 42 undergraduate academic programs, known as licenciaturas or ingenierías (equivalent to Bachelor of Arts, Bachelor of Science and Bachelor of Laws), as well as 120 graduate programs.

Universidad Panamericana has 5 Schools and 3 Faculties.

- School of Institutions Administration
- School of Health Sciences
- School of Economic and Administrative Sciences
- School of Communication
- Faculty of Engineer
- Faculty of Law
- Faculty of Philosophy
- Faculty of Pedagogy

UP is widely known for its 'specialty' programs, a 1-year-long graduate program to study a certain topic, distinguishing from a Master's degree in that master programs have a duration of 2 years, in addition, speciality students do not have to write a Thesis in order to graduate.

The university is also in charge of the Preparatoria Universidad Panamericana (Panamerican University Highschool), a high school with the same educational principles. It has two distinct campuses one for boys and another for girls, called Yaocalli.

== Accreditations ==
- ABET (Accreditation Board for Engineering and Technology)
- CENEVAL (Centro Nacional para la Evaluación de la Educación Superior)
- ENARM (Examen Nacional de Aspirantes a Residencias Médicas)

== Reputation ==
- Ranked 4th best university in Mexico by QS World University Rankings
- 2nd best private university in Mexico by QS World University Rankings
- 15th best university in Mexico by Times Higher Education World University Rankings

For more information see the IPADE Rankings.

== International programs ==
For several years, the university has offered several exchange agreements with the following universities (among others):

- Fachhochschule Schmalkalden
- University of Lethbridge
- University of Navarra
- University of Westminster
- University of Exeter
- Université de Montréal
- Bond University
- Dalhousie University
- European Business School International University Schloss Reichartshausen
- Shanghai Normal University

== Notable faculty ==
- Carlos Abascal
- Hector Zagal
- Leonardo Polo
- Miguel Alessio Robles
- Sergio Salvador Aguirre Anguiano

== Notable alumni ==
Some notable alumni from UP in politics include Enrique Peña Nieto (L.L.B., '91), who was the 57th President of Mexico (2012–2018); Governors Miguel Alejandro Alonso Reyes (L.L.B., '98 & M.P.P., 2022) of Zacatecas (2010–2016) and Martín Orozco Sandoval (B.A., '89) of Aguascalientes (2016–2022); Senator Kenia López Rabadán (M.P.P., 2012) of the National Action Party (2018–); Jesús Pablo Lemus Navarro (M.A., 2012), Mayor of Guadalajara (2021–) and César Nava Vázquez (L.L.B., '97), wgo was President of the National Action Party (2009–2010), Representative for Mexico City (2009–2012) as well as Personal Secretary to President Felipe Calderón (2006–2008).

UP has produced several notable businessmen and businesswomen, including Marcos Martínez Gavica (MBA, '95), the incumbent chairman of the Mexican Stock Exchange since 2020, CEO of Santander Mexico (2016–2020) and chairman of the Mexican Association of Banks (2005–2007 & 2017–2019); Juan Ignacio Gallardo Thurlow (MBA, '85), who has a net worth of around $1.3B, a member of the board of directors of Santander, Bombardier, Grupo Aeroportuario del Pacífico, Rabobank and former CEO of Cultiba, a Mexican leading holding company whose operations engage in the production and distribution of cane sugar, molasses and soft drinks. It is the only company in Mexico that distributes all Pepsi-brand drinks across Mexico. He was also the chief negotiatior of the Mexican Business Delegation during the NAFTA agreement-seeking hearings; and Daniel Becker Feldman (MBA, '93), chairman of the Mexican Association of Banks (2021–2012) and CEO of Mifel Financial Group, a leading Mexican commercial bank and financial servicies institution.

Academic

- Hector Zagal, philosopher and writer

=== Honoris Causa degrees ===
Some of the Honoris Causa degrees awarded by the UP include:

- Kim B. Clark, American economist

== Affiliated schools ==
- Universidad Panamericana Preparatoria (senior high school)
