= Jorge Francisco Sotomayor =

Mexican politician

- Born: 5 February 1980 (age 46); Federal District, Mexico
- Education: Universidad Panamericana
- Occupation: Deputy
- Political party: PAN (1998–2015)

Jorge Francisco Sotomayor Chávez (born 5 February 1980) is a Mexican independent politician formerly affiliated with the PAN. He was a deputy in the LXII Legislature of the Mexican Congress (2012-2015) representing the Federal District.
