= Luis Mendoza Acevedo =

Mexican politician (born 1980)

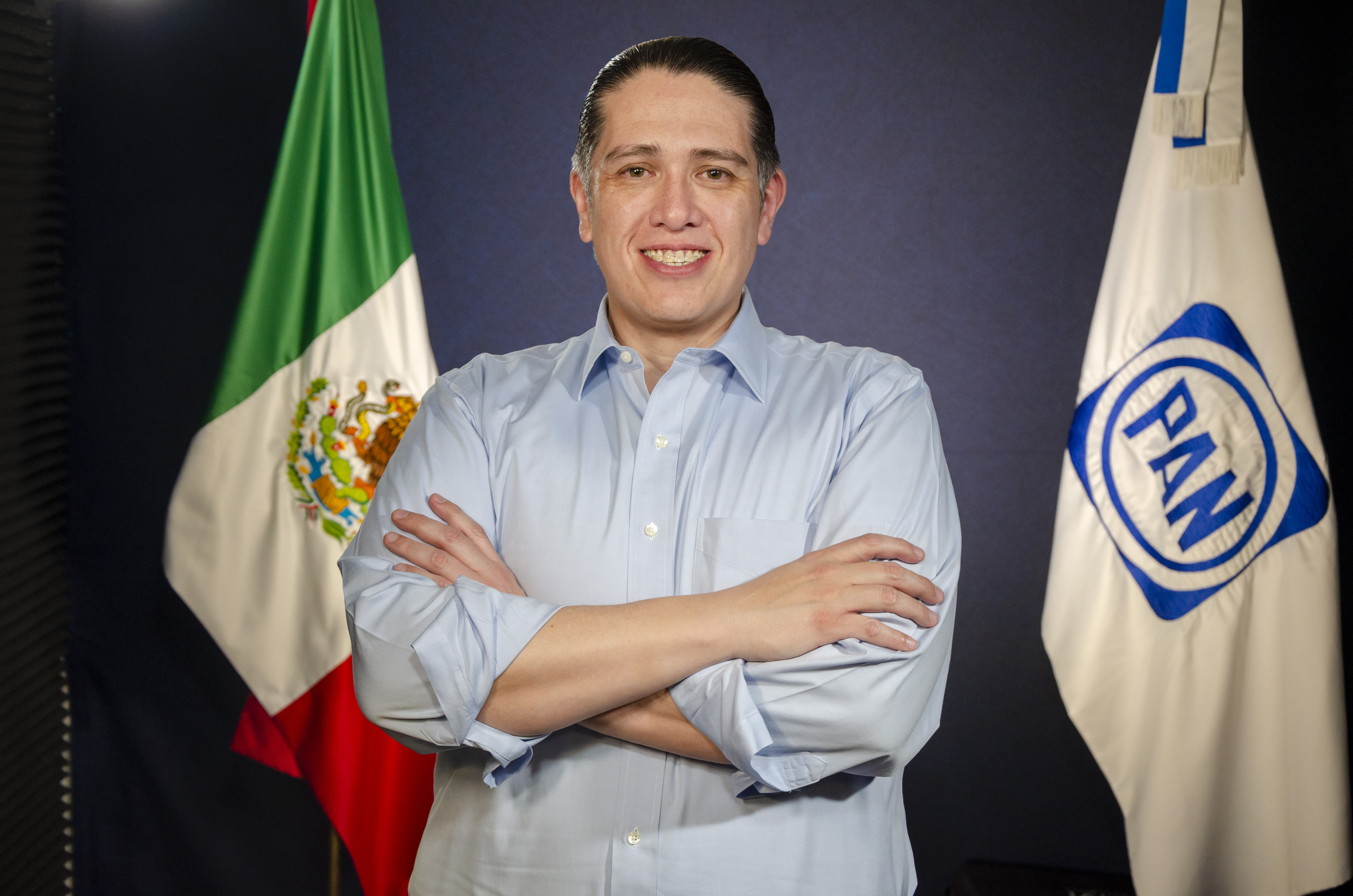
- Mendoza in 2022

Mayor of Benito Juárez
- Incumbent
- Assumed office 1 October 2024
- Preceded by: Jaime Isael Mata Salas

Personal details
- Born: 12 January 1980 (age 46)
- Party: National Action Party (since 2004)

Luis Alberto Mendoza Acevedo (born 12 January 1980) is a Mexican politician from the National Action Party (PAN). In the 2024 local elections, he was elected to a three-year term as mayor of Benito Juárez, Mexico City.

From 2018 to 2024, he was a member of the Chamber of Deputies, representing Mexico City's 15th district. From 2015 to 2018, he was a member of the Legislative Assembly of the Federal District.
