= Eneko (given name) =

Eneko is a Basque masculine given name, derived from the hypocoristic, old Basque name Enneco, "my little/dear", from ene (my) + ko (little). Variants of the name rendered in Spanish include Inigo and the most widespread form Íñigo or Iñigo. The name may refer to:

- Eneko Aguilar (born 2000), Spanish footballer
- Eneko Andueza (born 1979), Basque socialist politician
- Eneko Arieta (1933–2004), Basque footballer
- Eneko Aritza (c. 770–852), original Basque naming for the first king of Pamplona, most frequently rendered as Iñigo Arista in English literature
- Eneko Atxa (born 1977), Basque chef
- Eneko Belausteguigoitia (1933–2025), Mexican businessman and patron of Basque origin
- Eneko Bóveda (born 1988), Spanish footballer
- Eneko Capilla (born 1995), Basque footballer
- Eneko Conde Pujana (born 1978), Spanish rally driver
- Eneko Fernández (born 1984), Basque footballer
- Eneko Goia (born 1971), Basque politician
- Eneko Jauregi (born 1996), Spanish footballer
- Eneko Llanos (born 1976), Basque athlete
- Eneko Ortiz (born 2003), Spanish footballer
- Eneko Romo (born 1979), Basque footballer
- Eneko Sagardoy (born 1994), Basque actor
- Eneko Satrústegui (born 1990), Basque footballer
- Eneko Undabarrena (born 1993), Spanish footballer
- Ignatius of Loyola (c. 1491–1556), né Eneko ("Eneco"), Basque saint
- Íñigo of Oña (died 1057), hermit canonized as saint in 1259
