= Manuel Minjares Jiménez =

Mexican politician

Member of the Chamber of Deputies for the Federal District′s 15th district
- In office 1 September 2006 – 5 February 2008
- Preceded by: Federico Döring Casar
- Succeeded by: Rosaura Virginia Denegre
- In office 1 September 2000 – 31 August 2003
- Preceded by: José Espina Von Roehrich
- Succeeded by: Federico Döring Casar

Personal details
- Born: 29 May 1967 (age 59) Córdoba, Veracruz, Mexico
- Party: PAN
- Occupation: Politician

José Manuel Minjares Jiménez (born 29 May 1967) is a Mexican politician affiliated with the National Action Party (PAN). He served as a federal deputy representing the Federal District's fifteenth district for the PAN in both 2000–2003 (58th Congress) and 2006–2007 (60th Congress).
