= Mexican immigration to Cuba =

Mexican Cubans Mexicanos en Cuba
Total population
- 1,191 (2022)

Regions with significant populations
- Havana, Santiago de Cuba, Cienfuegos.

Languages
- Mexican Spanish and Cuban Spanish

Religion
- Roman Catholicism and Protestantism

Related ethnic groups
- Mexicans of European descent, Indigenous peoples of Mexico, Mestizos in Mexico

Mexican immigration to Cuba comprises people who emigrated from Mexico to Cuba and their descendants. Cuba is home to the most Mexicans living in the Caribbean. The waves of migration from Mexico to Cuba started from the 1970s, attracted by a mild climate.

The resident embassy of Mexico reported 2,752 Mexican citizens in Cuba in 2010, but estimates approximately 4,000 Mexican citizens crossing into the neighboring country for educational, business, commercial, industrial and tourist activities. The Mexican community has been primarily established in the city of Havana.

Many people from Yucatán, Campeche, Quintana Roo, Veracruz, Jalisco, and Tamaulipas share ties of familiarity with Cubans following the Caste War and industrial trade (Porfiriato) that drove Mexicans to migrate to the island.

== History ==
The Mayans were separated from their work during the eighteenth century, and they surreptitiously left with fugitive status prosecuted by the local authority. On the other hand, there were inherited debts, so that the children had to pay what the father could not have covered. This created a pattern, perpetuating dependence on the family. As the father came close to paying off his debt, the landowner was allowed to trade with their workers, establishing the slave market in Cuba.

Thus, entire families formed indigenous human chains moved in from the mainland to the island. Under these conditions they lived and suffered, especially many Yucatán Mayans in the mid-nineteenth century. Most were brought to Havana but others were brought to Cuba as farmers of sisal, sugarcane, and fodder in the provinces of Pinar del Río, Matanzas and Camagüey.

A colonel in the Mexican army who reached the stars of Major General in the Ten Years' War, José Inclán Riasco, a native of Mexico City, was shot in Port-au-Prince in 1872. Another Mexican, Gabriel Gonzalez, was a Brigadier General in the Great War.

== Mexican communities ==
=== Yucatecans ===
The Yucatecans, the largest Mexican community on Cuban soil, are distributed in Havana, Pinar del Río, and Matanzas. This community arrived in Mexico from the Spanish colonial period, as slaves were brought to the island to work the sugar plantations. Many other Yucatecans came during the Caste War in the nineteenth century. Migration from the Yucatán decreased in the twentieth century. A notable amount of modern day Cubans have traceable ancestry from the Yucatan Peninsula as the result of Mayan importation to the island.

The majority of the Mexican diaspora in Cuba are descendants of immigrants from Yucatán.

== Statistics ==
Census year	Mexican residents
2000	520
2005	826 ▲
2010	2,752 ▲

== See also ==
- Cuban immigration to Mexico
- Cuba–Mexico relations
