= Indigo (given name) =

- Indigo tints and shades.
- Gender: Unisex
- Language: English

Origin
- Meaning: Indigo

Indigo is a given name often used in reference to the color, a shade between the colors blue and violet. Deep blue indigo dye was originally derived from the plant called true indigo.

The name is in use for both boys and girls in the Anglosphere. It has ranked among the 1,000 most popular names for newborn girls in England and Wales at different points since 1999 and in the United States since 2021.

It may refer to:

== Men ==
- Indigo Diaz (born 1998), Canadian professional baseball pitcher for the New York Yankees

== Women ==
- Indigo, stage name of American actress and DJ Alyssa Nichols (born 1984)
- Indigo De Souza (born 1997), American–Brazilian singer-songwriter
- Indigo Sparke, Australian indie rock musician

== Fictional characters ==
- Sister Indigo, a character from the 1985 American drama television series Hell Town

== See also ==
- Inigo
