= Miguel Alessio Robles =

Mexican lawyer

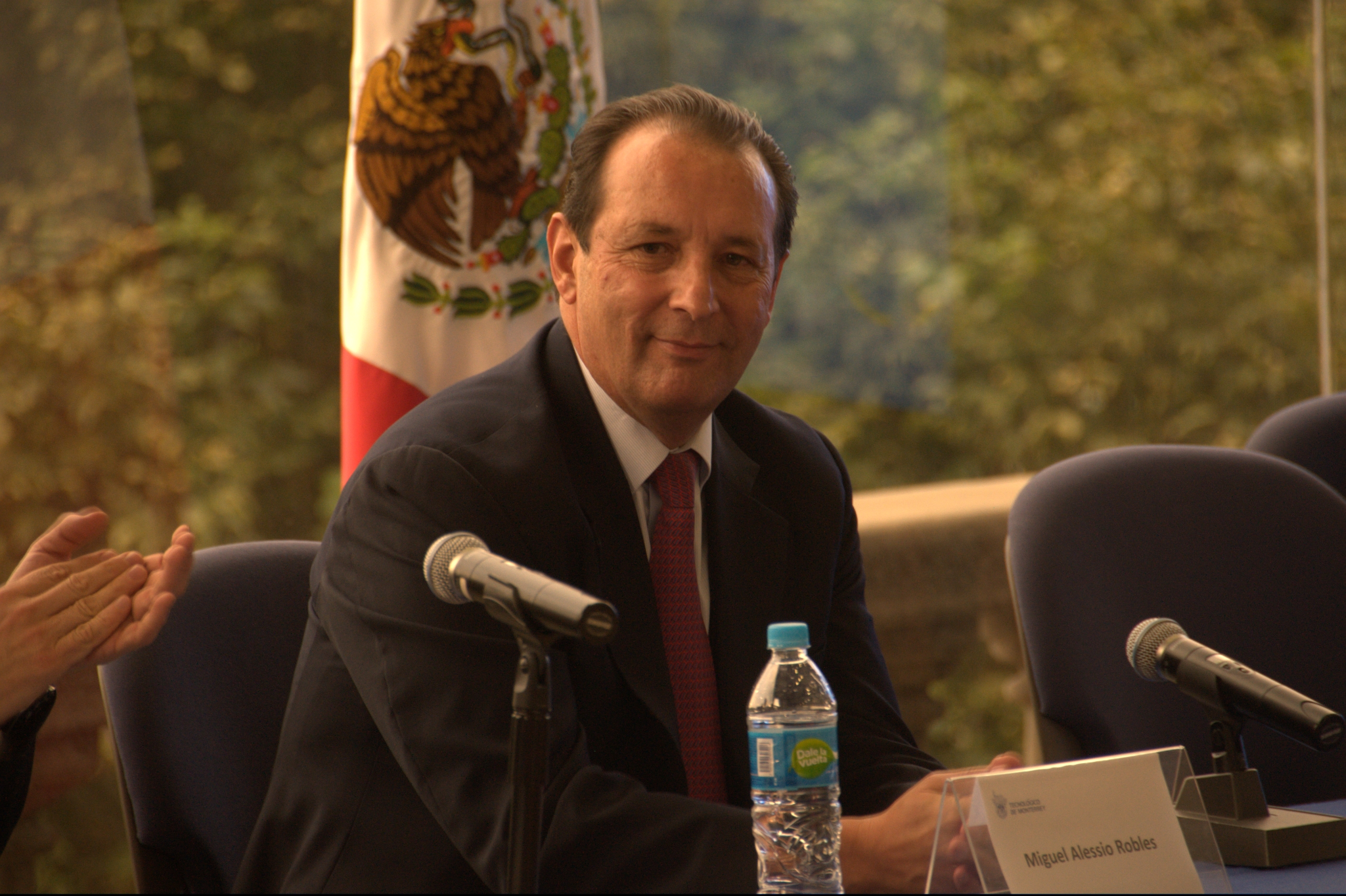
Alessio Robles at the presentation of his book at Monterrey Institute of Technology and Higher Education, Mexico City.

Miguel Alessio Robles is a lawyer, notary public, public official, and professor in law in Mexico. He received his law degree from the Escuela Libre de Derecho and has been a registered notary public in Mexico City since 1988. Specializing in commercial law, he is one of the founding partners of the Alcántary y Alessio Robles law firm and of the Notary Public 19. As a notary he has had clients such as Iberdrola and Santander Group.

He has taught classes at the Escuela Libre de Derecho and is a tenured professor at the Panamerican University.

In 2007, he was named the Subsecretary of Judicial Matters and Human Rights (Subsecretario de Asuntos Jurídicos y Derechos Humanos) under President Felipe Calderón. However, this appointment was controversial because he was accused of fraudulent practices in regards to shareholder meetings in 2005 and 2006, which resulted in the merger of Televisora del Valle de México into TV Azteca. In the position, there was more controversy as he defended former president Vicente Fox who was being investigated at the time. He resigned this position in 2008 to be appointed hours later as the judicial counselor (consejero jurídico) for Felipe Calderón.

In 2013, he declared the Ley General de Víctimas (General Law for Victims) unconstitutional and unworkable.

He has written a number of articles on legal topics as well as a book called “Temas de Derechos Reales” which analyzes various controversial legal topics in Mexico especially in real estate law.
