= Universidad Panamericana Preparatoria =

High school in Mexico City

- Mexico City; Mexico

Information
- School type: Private school
- Gender: Boys and girls (educated separately)
- Affiliation: Panamerican University

Universidad Panamericana Preparatoria (Preparatoria UP or prepaUP) is a private senior high school in Mexico City, affiliated with Universidad Panamericana. It has separate campuses for girls and boys. The Campus Yaocalli (Centro Escolar Yaocalli), for girls, is located in Colonia Miguel Hidalgo, Tlalpan. The boys' campus or the Campus Varonil is in Col. Ex Hacienda Guadalupe Chimalistac in Álvaro Obregón.
