= Íñigo Vélez de Guevara =

Íñigo Vélez de Guevara is the name of three members of a Spanish noble family from the 17th century:

- Íñigo Vélez de Guevara, 7th Count of Oñate (1566–1644)
- Íñigo Vélez de Guevara, 8th Count of Oñate (1597–1658)
- Íñigo Vélez de Guevara, 10th Count of Oñate (1642–1699)
