= Cuban Mexicans =

Cuban Mexicans cubano-mexicanos
Total population
- 22,604 Cuban-born residents (2016) Unknown number of Mexicans of Cuban descent

Regions with significant populations
- Mexico City • Quintana Roo • Veracruz • Yucatán

Languages
- Spanish and Cuban Spanish

Religion
- Roman Catholicism • Santeria

Related ethnic groups
- Cuban diaspora

There is a significant Cuban diaspora in Mexico. Cubans have been a presence in Mexico since the Viceregal era and they have made notable contributions to the culture and politics of the country.

== Migration history ==
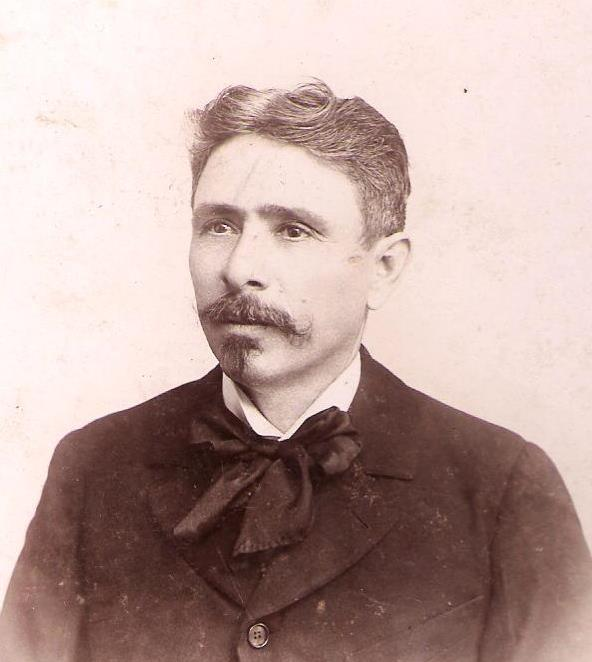
Professor Rodolfo Menéndez de la Peña (1850-1928)

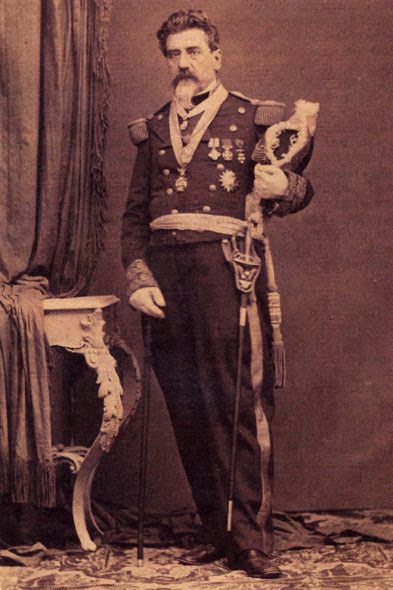
Pedro de Ampudia, prominent military officer and politician who served as Governor of Tabasco, Yucatán, and Nuevo León.

Hernán Cortés and his crew of soldiers and sailors used Cuba as a launching point for the conquest of the Aztec Empire. Cuba-born individuals began arriving during the colonial era and have continued into the post-independence era. Many arrived fleeing from the chaos caused by the Cuban War of Independence. Fidel Castro and his followers used Mexico as a launching point for the Cuban Revolution. The majority of modern Cuban migrants have been exiles or refugees fleeing from the Communist regime in Cuba. Both countries share the Spanish language; their historical origins are common (part of the Spanish Empire).

As of 2012, there were 14,637 Cuban-born individuals registered with the Mexican government as living in Mexico. However, the number is likely larger as not all Cubans in the country are legal residents.

The number of registered Cuban residents increased 560% between 2010 and 2016, from 4,033 to 22,604 individuals. During the same period, there was a 710% increase in the Cuban presence in Quintana Roo; a fourth of the population (5,569 individuals) live in that state.

== Culture ==
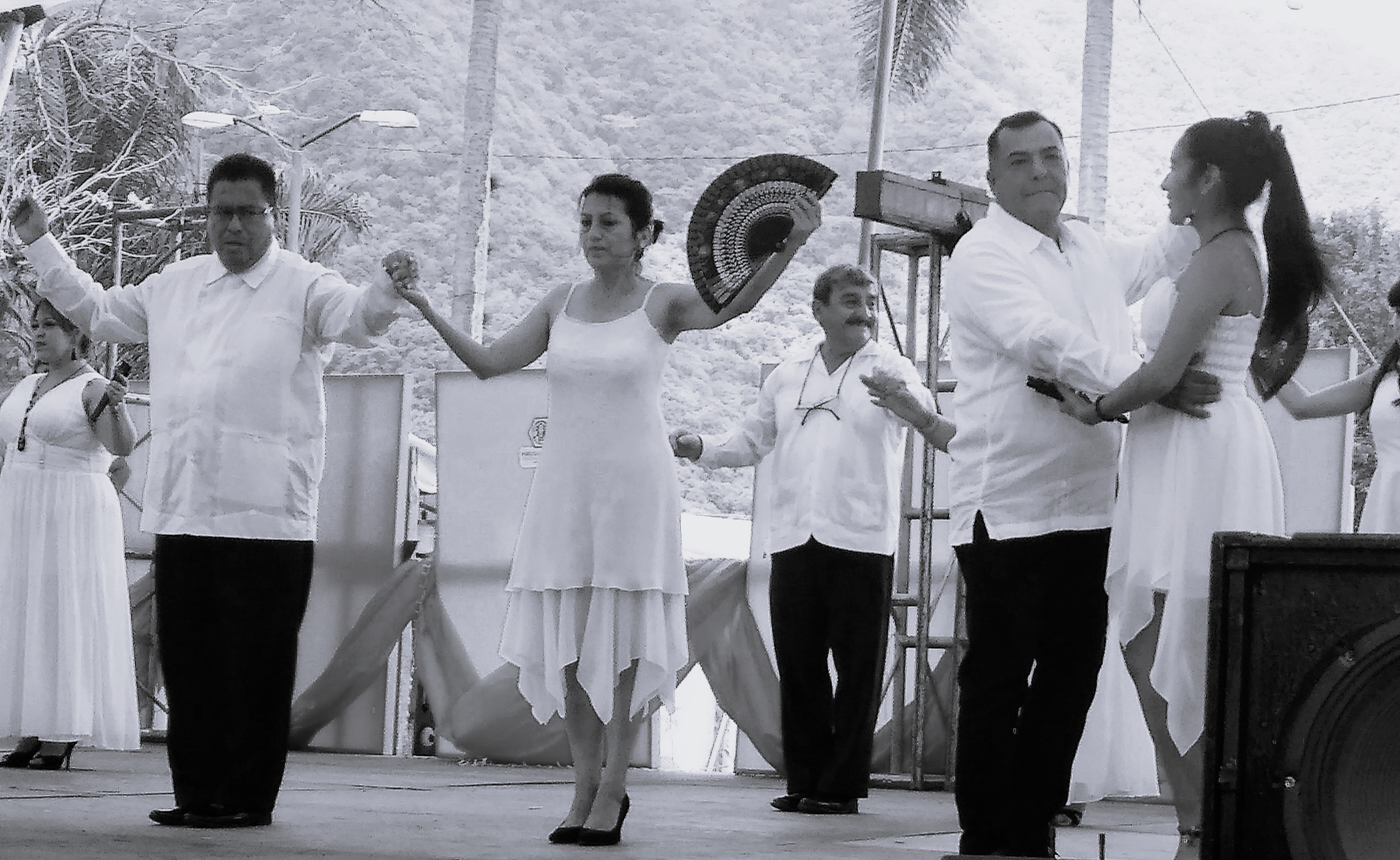
Danzón performance in Orizaba, Veracruz

The danzón arrived with traders and refugees of the Ten Years' War through the ports in Veracruz and Yucatan. While the genre has gone out of style in Cuba, it continues to be popular in Mexico. It reached its peak in popularity in the ballrooms of Mexico City in the 1940s, then went through a decline and afterwards entered a renaissance in the late 20th century. The most famous Mexican danzón piece is Danzón No. 2.

Cuban music also influenced Mexican Cinema, with a genre known as rumberas.

== Notable people ==
=== Politics ===
- Aída Sullivan – First lady of Mexico (Cuban mother)
- Pedro de Ampudia – Military officer, politician

=== Entertainment ===
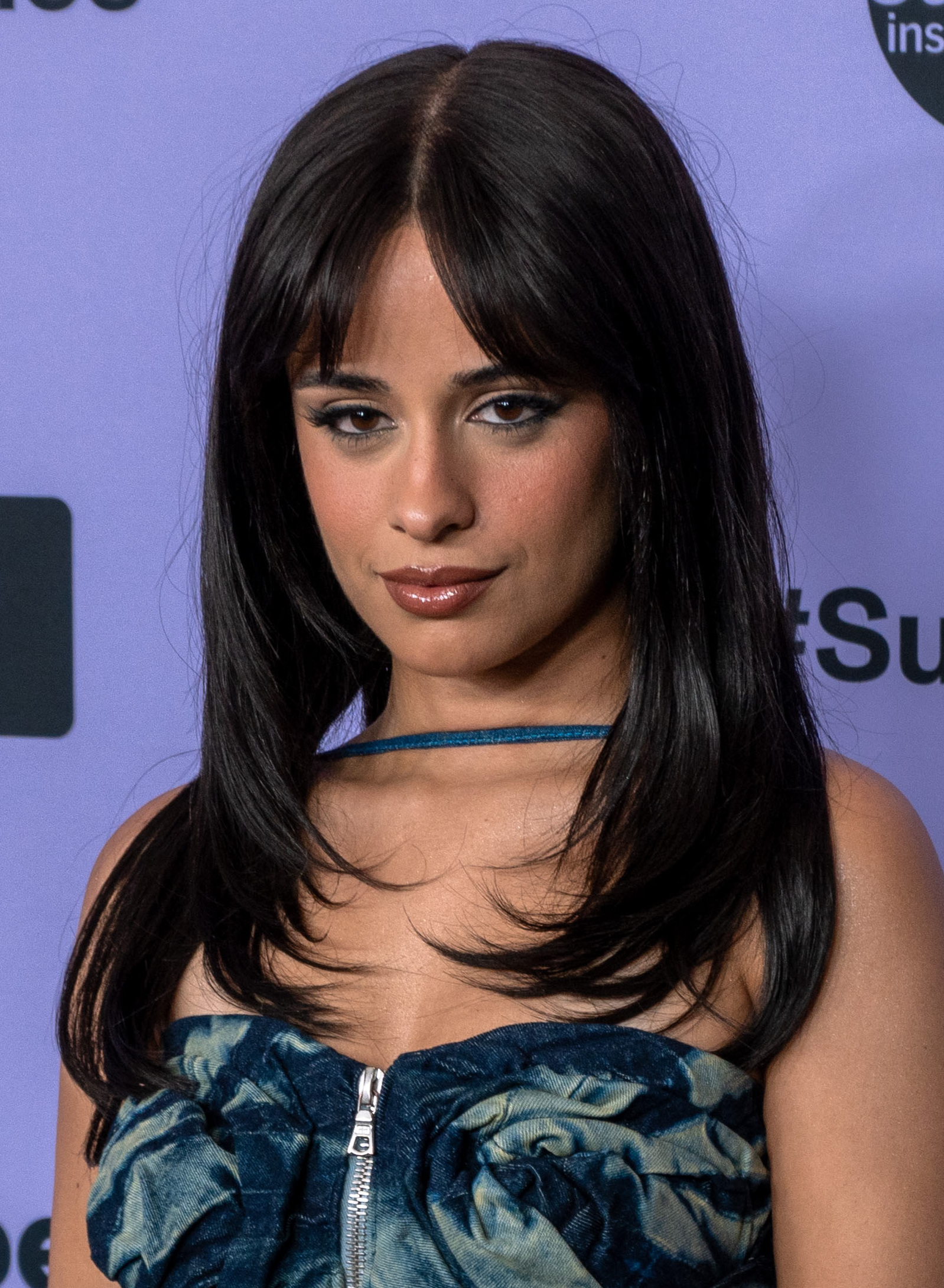
Singer-songwriter Camila Cabello, born to a Mexican father and a Cuban mother, She spent much of her early life moving back and forth between Mexico and Cuba

- Amalia Aguilar – Dancer, actress, comedian
- Alberto Guerra – Actor
- Camila Cabello – Singer-songwriter
- Carmen Montejo – Actress
- Dámaso Pérez Prado – Bandleader and composer (naturalized Mexican)
- Gina Romand – Actress
- Jorge Ortiz de Pinedo – Comedian, actor (Cuban father)
- Livia Brito – Actress
- María Antonieta Pons – Actress, singer
- Ninón Sevilla – Actress, dancer
- Niurka Marcos – Dancer, singer (naturalized Mexican)
- Raquel Olmedo – Singer, actress
- Rosa Carmina –Actress, dancer

=== Sports ===
- Jorge Orta – Baseball player (Cuban parents)
- José Nápoles – Boxer (naturalized Mexican)
- Randy Arozarena – Baseball player (naturalized Mexican)
- Ozziel Herrera – Soccer player (Cuban father)

== See also ==
- Cuba–Mexico relations
- Mexicans in Cuba
