= Carlos Llano Cifuentes =

Mexican philosopher and professor

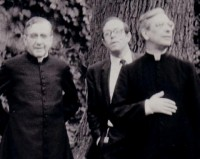
Carlos Llano Cifuentes (center) with Josemaría Escrivá and Alvaro del Portillo

Carlos Llano Cifuentes (México City, February 17, 1932 – Miami, May 5, 2010) was a Mexican philosopher and university professor, as well as one of the founding members of IPADE Business School and founder of Universidad Panamericana. Carlos lived an exemplary life and was a member of the Opus Dei. In the picture below he is pictured with José Maria Escriba who wrote the book that all the members of the Opus Dei study.

== Early life and education ==
He received his BA and PhD in Philosophy from the Complutense University of Madrid, the University of Saint Thomas in Rome (Angelicum), and the National Autonomous University of Mexico (UNAM), while also studying Economics in the Complutense University.

== Career ==
In 1958, Llano launched ISTMO magazine, which publishes articles about humanist thought and ideas about society. In 1967, he founded the IPADE Business School, which has been ranked among the top 10 Business Schools in the world by Forbes magazine and the Financial Times. He also founded the Universidad Panamericana in 1967, which now has three campuses in Mexico — Mexico City, Guadalajara, and Aguascalientes — and is ranked as a top-tier Mexican university.

Llano wrote many books and papers on the topic of philosophy and business, especially on the anthropology of management action.

== Works ==
- Ser del hombre y hacer de la organización Ediciones Ruz, México,2010
- Ensayos sobre José Gaos: metafísica y fenomenología. Instituto de Investigaciones Filosóficas-UNAM, México, 2008.
- Reflexio, Bases noéticas para una metafísica no racionalista, Ediciones Ruz-UP México, 2008.
- Demonstratio, Bases noéticas para una metafísica no racionalista, Ediciones Ruz-UP, México, 2007.
- Separatio, Bases noéticas para una metafísica no racionalista, Ediciones Ruz-UP México, 2007.
- Abstractio, Bases noéticas para una metafísica no racionalista, Editorial Cruz-UP, México, 2005.
- Viaje al centro del hombre Ediciones Ruz, México, 2007.
- Etiología del error, EUNSA, Pamplona, 2004.
- Etiología de la idea de la nada, Fondo de Cultura Económica, México, 2004
- Humildad y liderazgo, Ediciones Ruz, México, 2004.
- Falacias y ámbitos de la creatividad, Noriega Editores-IPADE, México, 2002.
- Nudos del humanismo en los albores del siglo XXI, Editorial Patria-CECSA, México, 2001
- La metamorfosis de las empresas, Granica, 2001.
- La amistad en la empresa. F.C.E., México, 2000.
- Examen filosófico del acto de la decisión. Editorial Cruz, México, 1999.
- La formación de la inteligencia, la voluntad y el carácter. Editorial Trillas, México, 1999.
- Examen filosófico del acto de la decisión. Editorial Cruz O - Universidad Panamericana. México, 1998.
- Sobre la idea práctica. Eunsa, Pamplona, 2007
- Dilemas éticos de la empresa contemporánea. Fondo de Cultura Económica. México, 1998.
- La enseñanza de la dirección y el método del caso. IPADE. México, 1996.
- La creación del empleo. Editorial Panorama. México, 1995.
- El conocimiento del singular. Editorial Cruz O - Universidad Panamericana, México, 1995.
- El nuevo empresario en México. Fondo de Cultura Económica. México, 1995.
- Los fantasmas de la sociedad contemporánea Editorial Trillas, México,1995.
- El postmodernismo en la empresa. Editorial McGraw-Hill. México, 1994.
- El empresario y su mundo. Editorial McGraw-Hill. México, 1991.
- El empresario y su acción. Editorial McGraw-Hill. México, 1991.
- El empresario ante la responsabilidad y la motivación. Editorial McGraw-Hill. México, 1991.
- Las formas actuales de la libertad Editorial Trillas, México,1983.
- Análisis de la acción directiva Editorial Limusa, México,1979 (15ª reimpresión, 2007).
