= Rosaura Denegre Vaught =

Mexican politician

- Born: 1 November 1981 (age 44); Mexico City, Mexico
- Occupation: Politician
- Political party: PAN

Rosaura Virginia Denegre Vaught Ramírez (born 1 November 1981) is a Mexican politician from the National Action Party. From 2008 to 2009 she served as Deputy of the LX Legislature of the Mexican Congress representing the Federal District.
