= Cuba–Mexico relations =

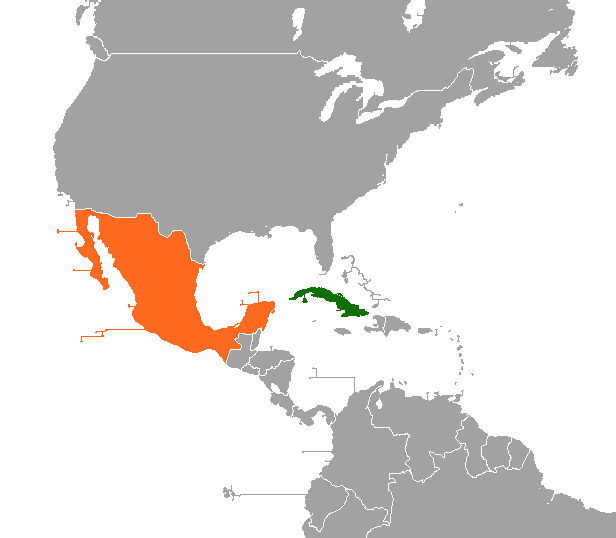

- Cuba: Mexico

The nations of Cuba and Mexico have had uninterrupted diplomatic relations since their establishment in 1902. Both nations are members of the Association of Caribbean States, Community of Latin American and Caribbean States, Latin American Integration Association, Organization of Ibero-American States, and the United Nations.

== Early relations ==
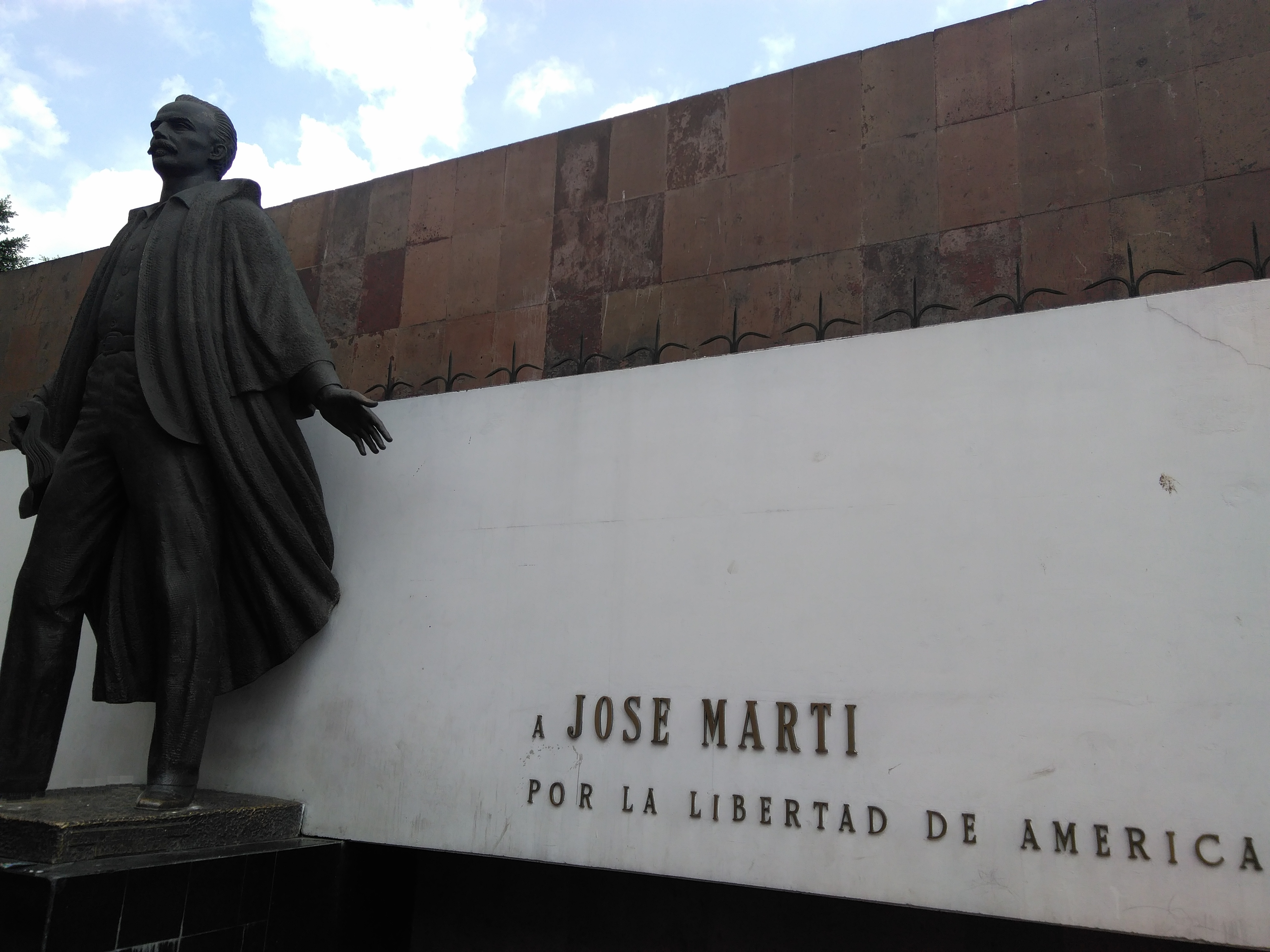
Statue of José Martí in Mexico City

Cuba and Mexico are Latin American nations. They were both colonized by the Spanish Empire. During Spanish colonization, Cuba was under the administration of the Viceroyalty of New Spain in Mexico City. In 1821, Mexico gained independence from Spain, but Cuba remained a part of the Spanish Empire for 77 years until it won independence from Spain in 1898 as a result of the Spanish–American War. Cuban national hero José Martí lived for a time in Mexico and published several books there.

=== Background on Mexican independence ===
Despite the victory of Mexico over the last Spanish bastion in San Juan de Ulúa, Spain refused to recognize the Treaty of Córdoba and hence the independence of Mexico.

The Mexican government, led by Guadalupe Victoria, came to the conclusion that Spain, by its refusal to recognize the treaties, still posed a threat, and could use Cuba as a platform to launch a campaign to recover Mexico. Lucas Alamán, who was then the Mexican Minister of Foreign Affairs, assessed the threat posed by the military forces stationed in Cuba to Mexico. Since 1824, Alamán had held the belief that Mexico should seize Cuba, arguing that "Cuba without Mexico is aimed at imperialist yoke; Mexico without Cuba is a prisoner of the Gulf of Mexico." He believed that the Mexican forces, with the support of foreign powers such as France or England (which had been the first European power to recognize the independence of Mexico on July 16, 1836), could overcome the Spanish in Cuba.

Spain continued to interfere in Mexican affairs, maintaining military garrisons along the Mexican coast. These Spanish holdouts suffered a major setback in 1825 when the Mexican Army captured the key port city of Veracruz, but Spain continued to launch armed expeditions against Mexico from the nearby island of Cuba. The island colony also served as an important Spanish naval base, allowing the Spanish to harass Mexican trade in the Gulf of Mexico and project power in the region.

==== Battle of Mariel ====
Seeking to challenge Spanish control of the gulf, the Mexican Navy began to conduct sorties in the region in the mid-1820s. In early 1828 a squadron of three brigs under the command of Commodore David Porter began to sortie into the gulf, seeking to disrupt Spanish shipping. One of the three brigs was the 22-gun Guerrero, which had recently taken on a crew of American volunteers in New Orleans and was under the command of Porter's nephew, Captain David Henry Porter.

Eventually the Mexican brig Guerrero was forced to surrender, with the ship's crew (including future United States Navy admiral David Dixon Porter) being imprisoned in Havana. The battle at Mariel became the last ship-to-ship engagement between the Mexican and Spanish navies.

=== Background on Cuban independence ===
After the Spanish–American War, the United States gained control of Cuba. Under the Platt Amendment, the United States granted Cuba limited sovereignty.

=== Cubans fleeing political persecution to Mexico ===
On 20 May 1902, Cuba and Mexico established diplomatic relations. Cuba's post-independence was defined by several instances of political instability that generated successive waves of dissidents seeking asylum and safety elsewhere. Mexico became a country where Cubans would flee to when escaping political persecution, including notable Cubans like Fidel Castro, who fled to Mexico from the Batista regime. Mexico later became the site where Fidel Castro, Ernesto "Che" Guevara, and others started their trek back to Cuba to overthrow the regime of Fulgencio Batista. Mexico's status as a political refuge for Cubans fleeing persecution would eventually establish a sustainable diaspora community in the country.

In 1923, both nations established resident embassies in their respective capitals.

=== Mexico's role in the Cuban Revolution ===
Mexico's popularity as a destination for Cuban political dissidents gave it an important role in the formative moments of the Cuban Revolution. After meeting in Mexico, Fidel Castro and Ernesto "Che" Guevara began to plan a guerilla war against the Batista regime in Cuba to take back Cuba for the people. This movement became known as the "26th of July Movement," which began when Castro and Che entered Cuba in 1956 to overthrow dictator Batista, who ultimately fled the country in 1959. Mexico was a prime launching point for their boat since it was much easier to successfully get to Cuba from Mexico than if they had started from another country. Mexico gave Castro the advantage to plan and launch the movement without the backlash that other countries that supported the Batista regime may have given him. On a final note, the Cuban government was backed by the American government at the time, so any movement against Cuba was also against the US. This caused the relations to sour, as soon as Castro became victorious, which also showed Mexico that they needed to understand the need to be cautious with their Cuban relations from now on.

== Cold War relations (1959–1991) ==
=== American and Soviet influence on Mexican–Cuban relations ===
The aspect of Mexican–Cuban relations affected the influence of the United States and the Soviet Union. Throughout the 20th century, the two countries exerted control over the Latin American region. Mexico had to be especially cautious not to anger the United States when interacting with Cuba or the Soviet Union, making the relations more complicated.

As the Cold War began, there were rising tensions between the United States and the Soviet Union. Mexico had to be careful of how its relations with each country could affect the other country's perception of Mexico. The United States had a Good Neighbor Policy towards countries like Mexico who were cautious as to whether or not they should support the US or the USSR. Since the United States feared neutrality of countries over anything else, as neutrality can turn into communism later, they pushed nations like Mexico to side with the US. Later, President Kennedy strengthened the Good Neighbor Policy by implementing his Alliance for Progress program, which helped Latin American countries with "economic growth and development." With increased efforts by the US to bring Latin American countries like Mexico into its own sphere of influence and away from the influence of countries like the USSR and Cuba, Mexico was put into a difficult situation. This American influence would put a strain on Mexico whenever they wanted to have positive relations with Cuba, as it could have negative repercussions on Mexico's powerful neighbor.

The Soviet Union also directly affected the relations between Mexico and Cuba. The USSR had a large influence on Cuba already, which caused the relationship between Cuba and the United States to be problematic and contentious. Cuba's economy and independence from the US would not have been as stable as it was without the Soviet support they received, making them in debt to the USSR. Mexico had to be careful when dealing with either Cuba or the USSR because of the problems that would be created in Mexican–American relations.

=== Cuba's expulsion from the Organization of American States ===
The Organization of American States (OAS) was an organization formed after World War II in 1948 to help "settle inter-American (hemisphere) disputes." Following the Cuban Missile Crisis, Cuba was expelled from the OAS.

Mexico was the one of only two countries in the Americas to maintain diplomatic ties with Cuba throughout the Cuban missile crisis. This demonstrated Mexico's dedication to keeping ties with Cuba, even when they had to consider how the United States could react. "We have a problem when a foreign government calls our brothers the enemy of the hemisphere. We are not Haiti, Grenada, Bahamas or Jamaica; we are not a colony that will adhere to decisions under American pressure". Mexican President Adolfo López Mateos statement during the Cuban missile crisis that pit the United States on a brink of nuclear war in Cuba.

=== Mexico supporting the United States during the Cold War but also supporting Havana ===
The Mexican government had to be cautious with how it conducted its foreign policy. Even though it was obvious that Mexico supported Cuba they also opposed Cuba's actions, to help maintain good relations with the US. Mexico realized that supporting their biggest partner the United States publicly was important to their country, however they were also interested in other foreign policies and relations. Mexico coined the term "Political Neutrality". This policy, which Mexico followed during the Cold War, is still being followed today, with Mexico choosing to remain neutral in international disputes.

=== Increases in Mexican leftist propaganda and the Mexican Communist Party ===
After the Cuban Revolution, there was an increase in "leftist revolutionary propaganda" in Mexico. Some believed that the Cuban Revolution could be seen as a reflection of the Mexican Revolution decades earlier and they became intrigued by the situation in Cuba. Although it would have been difficult for Mexico to outright support the revolution, because of the United States' reaction, many Mexican citizens showed their support through art, music, and other propaganda. After the Cuban Revolution, some Mexicans felt more connected with the socialist country, seeing their struggles for freedom similar to what the Mexican people had endured earlier in the 20th century.

One of these groups in Mexico dedicated to portraying leftist propaganda was the Taller de Gráfica Popular (TGP). The TGP was a collective of artists who expressed Mexican culture, especially dealing with social issues in Mexico from the Revolution and later on in the century, through various art forms, like murals and prints. This group was seen as having some more radical opinions, especially with their aligning with the leftist views in Mexico. They would portray how they viewed ideas like the Mexican Revolution and the current issues in Mexico, which was important to the Mexican people. The Mexican government had been trying to limit the amount of leftist public opinions in the country, so this artistic group was not something that the Mexican government would have favored. The TGP had to be careful so that the artists did not do something too extreme that would cause the government to get involved. Overall, though, the TGP helped spread their views and displayed to Mexico, and countries abroad, that there were leftist political opinions in Mexico and that the Mexican people thought about their revolutionary ideals still, decades after the Mexican Revolution.

Additionally, there was a Mexican Communist Party that was allowed to operate during the Cold War. More likely to support causes in Cuba and the USSR, the Mexican government had to be careful with how they treated the party. Disbanding them could cause backlash among Mexican citizens, but allowing it to grow could anger the United States. The Communist Party, therefore, was allowed "to operate, but (the Mexican government) harassed, surveilled, jailed, and disappeared its leaders." Groups like the Communist Party in Mexico demonstrated open support for countries like Cuba within Mexican borders, but the government's treatment of the party was chosen specifically to show loyalty to the United States.

== Post-Cold War to the Present ==
=== Strains in the Mexican–Cuban relationship ===
==== Mexico recalls Havana ambassador in 1998 ====
In 1998, Cuban leader Fidel Castro made a comment that Mexican children recognize Mickey Mouse but do not know important individuals in Mexico's own history. Mexico and Cuba had relatively good relations up until that point, but this comment offended the Mexican government enough that they withdrew their ambassador from Havana. This event caused problems with the relations between Cuba and Mexico and would be the first in a line of events in recent years that would cause strains in their relationship.

==== 2002 United Nations Summit in Mexico ====
Another diplomatic issue occurred in 2002 when Vicente Fox, Mexico's pro-American president, allegedly "forced (Fidel Castro) to leave a United Nations summit in Mexico so that he would not cross paths with (US) President Bush." Fox also asked Castro not to say anything that could be seen as "criticizing the United States." To prove that it was forced, Castro produced a recording of his and Fox's conversation. This strain would continue between Cuba and Mexico since Fidel Castro believed Mexico was "too closely aligned with Washington," especially since the US still did not have diplomatic relations with Cuba.

==== Mexico votes in favor of UN resolutions against Cuba's human rights issues ====
In 2002, Mexican President Fox, "instructed the Mexican delegation to vote in favor of the UN resolution to criticize Cuba's human right's situation." This was a major shift from prior relations, where Mexico typically supported Cuba or chose to abstain from voting. Shortly after, Fox replaced the Cuban ambassador, which led to some distrust from Havana towards President Fox.

In 2004, Mexico's vote on a similar resolution became the deciding vote in a 22–21 vote against Cuba and its human rights issues. Castro criticized Mexico since the country also had human rights violations, calling Mexico and other Latin American countries, "'a herd of hypocrites.'" Citing earlier instances of Cuban Communist Party members entering the country on diplomatic passports, Mexican Foreign Secretary Luis Ernesto Debez and Interior Secretary Santiago Creel expelled the Cuban ambassador.

=== Improvements in the Mexican–Cuban relationship ===
Mexican President Felipe Calderon visited Havana in 2012 to help improve relations with Cuba. Calderon's visit with then-First Secretary of the Cuban Communist Party Raul Castro, brother of Fidel Castro, helped to restore relations after the notable confrontations of the Fox administration.

Mexican Foreign Minister José Antonio Meade visited Cuba in September 2013 to further the improvements in Mexican–Cuban relations. Many topics, including "trade and investment, as well as matters such as "'tourism, migration, cooperation, education, culture, health [and] energy'" were discussed between officials from both countries.

==== Mexico and Cuba increase cooperation ====
In December 2018, Cuban President Miguel Díaz-Canel paid a visit to Mexico to attend the inauguration of Mexican President Andrés Manuel López Obrador. President Díaz-Canel returned to Mexico in July 2019 to hold bilateral discussions with President López Obrador.

In July 2021, President López Obrador blamed the US embargo against Cuba for contributing to the unrest in Cuba. The foreign ministry sent two navy ships with food and medical supplies to assist Cuba.

In September 2021, President Díaz-Canel returned to Mexico to attend Mexico's Independence day celebration as a guest of honor of President López Obrador.

In May 2022, Mexican President Andrés Manuel López Obrador paid an official visit to Cuba where he was granted the Order of José Martí by President Díaz-Canel. Cuban President Miguel Díaz-Canel traveled to Campeche in February 2023, to be awarded the Mexican Order of the Aztec Eagle by President López Obrador. In October 2024, President Díaz-Canel travelled to Mexico to attend the inauguration of President Claudia Sheinbaum.

In 2026, Mexico stopped sending oil to Cuba following an executive order from US President Donald Trump threatening tariffs on countries providing oil to Cuba. Mexico provided humanitarian aid to Cuba to help alleviate the impacts of the US embargo.

== High-level visits ==
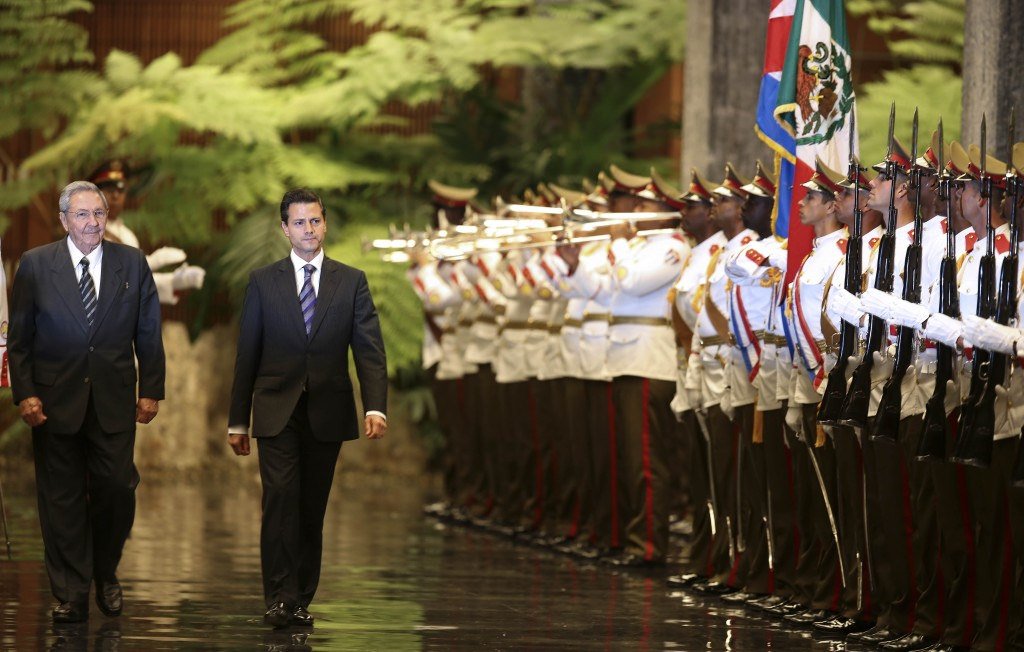
Mexican President Enrique Peña Nieto on an official visit to Cuba along with Cuban President Raúl Castro, January 2014.

Presidential visits from Cuba to Mexico

- President Fidel Castro (1960, 1979, 1981, 1988, 1991, 1994, 2000, 2002)
- President Raúl Castro (2010, 2015)
- President Miguel Díaz-Canel (2018, 2019, 2021, February and October 2023, 2024)

Presidential visits from Mexico to Cuba

- President Luis Echeverría (1975)
- President José López Portillo (1980)
- President Miguel de la Madrid Hurtado (1986)
- President Carlos Salinas de Gortari (1994)
- President Ernesto Zedillo (1999)
- President Vicente Fox (2002)
- President Felipe Calderón (2012)
- President Enrique Peña Nieto (2014, June and November 2016)
- President Andrés Manuel López Obrador (2022)

== Bilateral relations ==
Both nations have signed several bilateral agreements such as an Agreement for the exchange of Radiotelegraphy Correspondence (1928); Agreement for Economic and Industrial Collaboration (1975); Fishing Agreement (1976); Agreement on the Delimitation of the Maritime Spaces under the establishment of the Exclusive economic zone (1976); General Collaboration Agreement (1978); Agreement on Economic, Scientific and Technical Collaboration in Sugar Production and its Derivatives (1979): Agreement on Tourism Cooperation (1980); Trade Agreement (1984); Agreement on Cooperation to Combat International Drug Trafficking (1990); Transportation Agreement (1991); Treaty on the Execution of Criminal Sentences (1996); Agreement on Development Cooperation (1999); Agreement on the Reciprocal Promotion and Protection of Investments (2001); Agreement of Cooperation in Youth Education, Culture, Physical Education and Sports (2012); Agreement on Mutual Recognition and Revalidation of Titles, Diplomas and Higher Education Studies (2013); Treaty on Mutual Legal Assistance in Criminal Matters (2013); Extradition Treaty (2013); Treaty on the Delimitation of the Continental Platform in the Eastern Polygon of the Gulf of Mexico beyond 200 nautical miles (2017); and an Agreement of Cooperation in Mutual Administrative Assistance and Information Exchange in Customs Matters (2018).

== Transportation ==
There are direct flights between both nations with Aeroméxico, Aeroméxico Connect, Magnicharters and VivaAerobús.

== Trade ==
In 2023, trade between Cuba and Mexico totaled $279 million. Cuba's main exports to Mexico include: rum; cigars; plates; sheets; household goods; malt beer; canary birds; books; and aviation engines. Mexico's main exports to Cuba include: milk powder and tablets; fats and oils; aluminum caps; water; fertilizers of animal or plant origin; shampoos; and malt beer. Mexican multinational companies Cemex and Grupo Altex operate in Cuba.

== Resident diplomatic missions ==
of Cuba in Mexico

- Mexico City (Embassy)
- Cancún (Consulate-General)
- Mérida (Consulate-General)
- Monterrey (Consulate-General)
- Veracruz City (Consulate-General)

of Mexico in Cuba

- Havana (Embassy)
- Havana (Consulate)

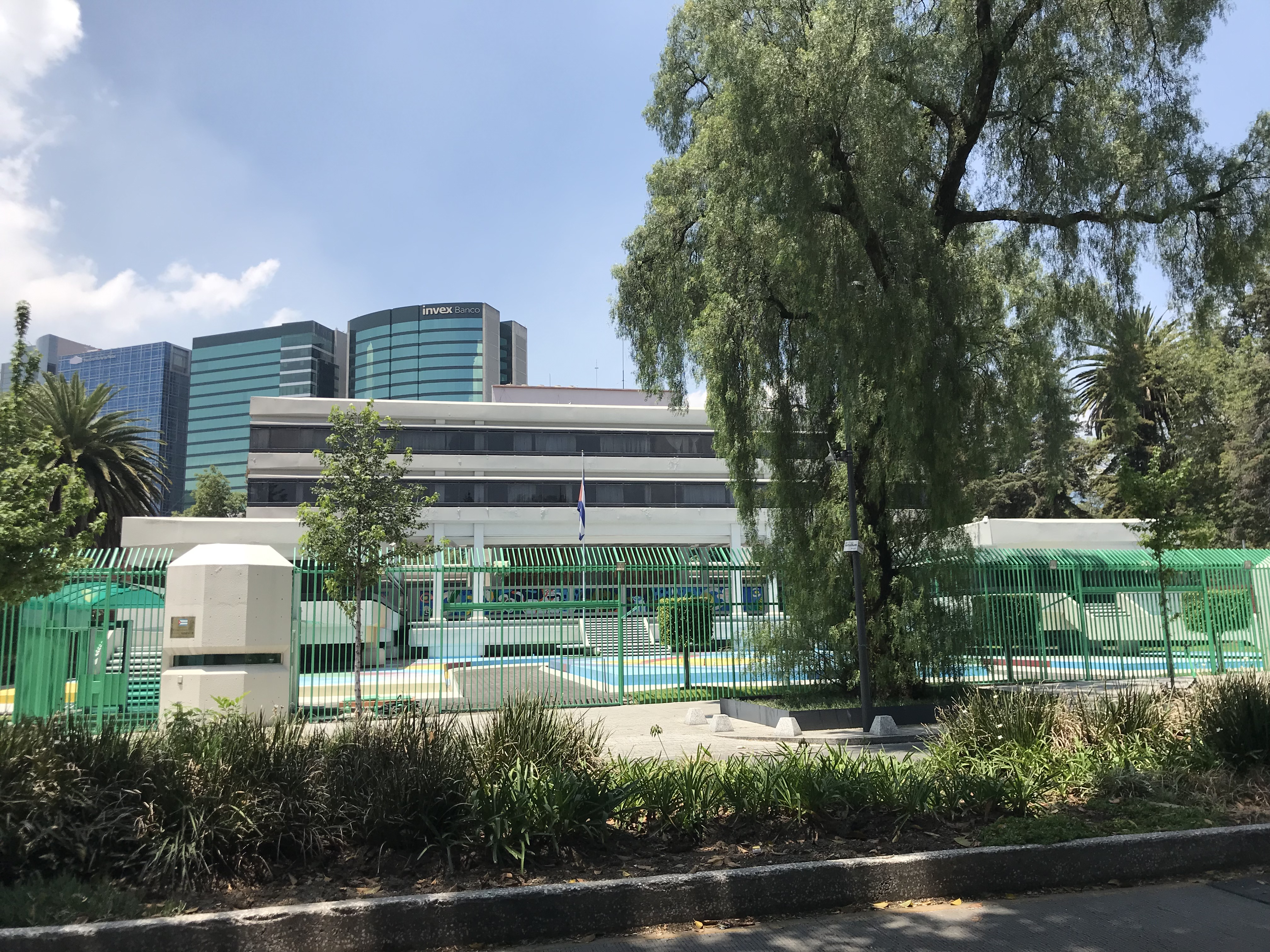
Embassy of Cuba in Mexico City

== Gallery ==
Statues of Fidel Castro and Che Guevara in Mexico City

Bust of Benito Juárez at the Museum of the Revolution in Havana

Flags of Mexico and Cuba at the Government Palace in Mérida, Mexico

== See also ==
- Centro Cultural José Martí
- Cuban Mexicans
- Mexican immigration to Cuba
