= César Nava Vázquez =

Mexican lawyer and politician

- Born: 16 July 1974 (age 51); Morelia, Michoacán, Mexico
- Occupations: Lawyer and politician
- Political party: National Action

José César Nava Vázquez (born 16 July 1974) is a Mexican lawyer and politician from the National Action Party (PAN).

Between 2000 and 2003 Nava Vázquez served as a plurinominal deputy in the 58th Congress. He returned to the Chamber of Deputies for the 61st Congress (2009–2012) when he was elected to represent the Federal District's fifteenth district for the PAN.

From 2009 to 2010 he served as President of the National Action Party.
