= Instituto Panamericano de Alta Dirección de Empresa =

Business school in Mexico

Coordinates: 19.4169°N 99.1336°W

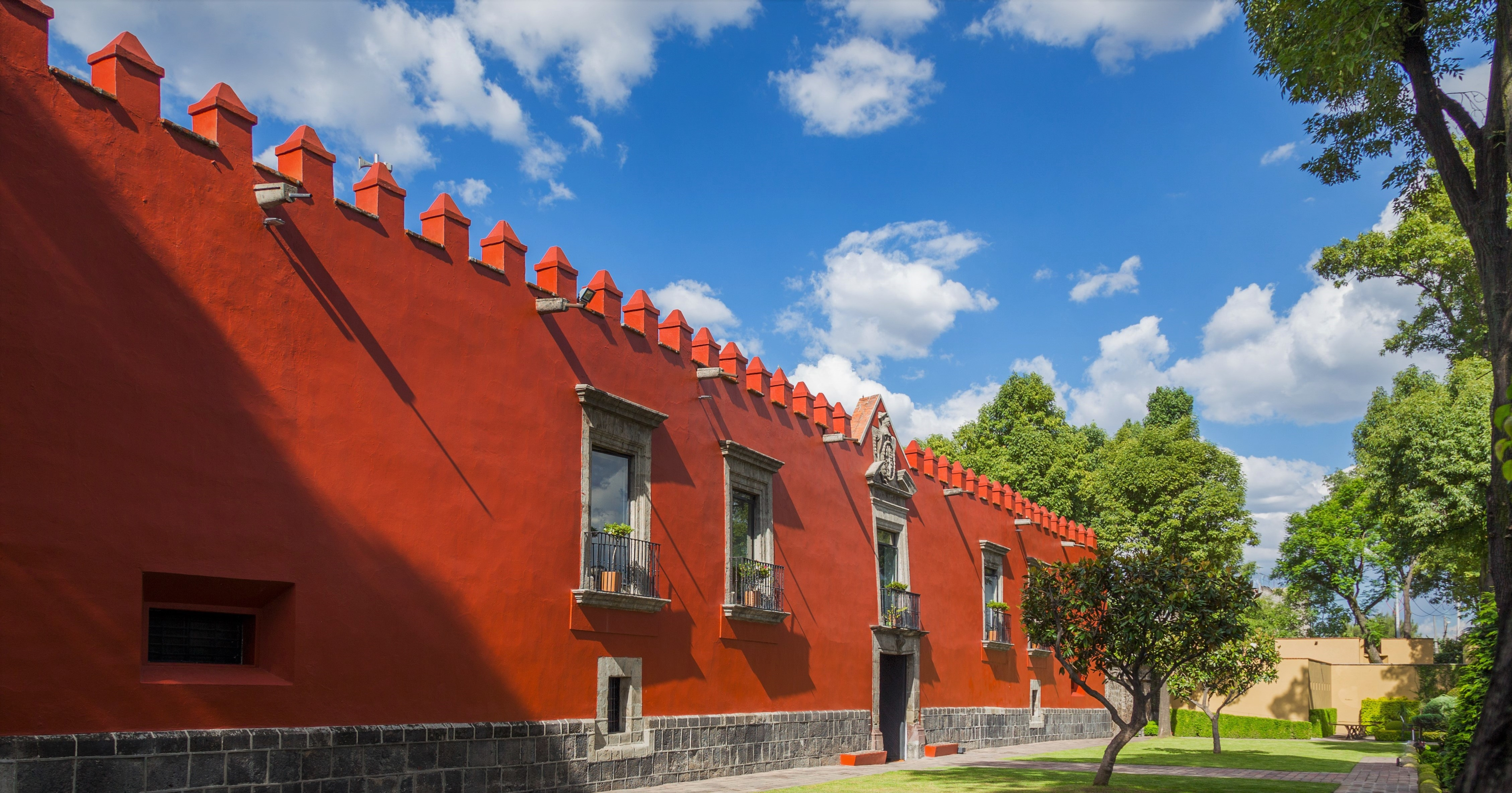
IPADE Mexico City headquarters

IPADE (PanAmerican Institute for High Business Management) is the business school of Universidad Panamericana, or Pan-American University, a private university in Mexico. The institute, from which the university came out later, was founded in 1967 by a notable group of Mexican businessmen.

More than 22,000 graduates, many of them CEOs of Mexican and international companies, have passed through the institute. IPADE has a Christian orientation, entrusted to the Opus Dei prelature.

Besides its campus in Mexico City, Guadalajara, Monterrey and Aguascalientes IPADE organizes alternate and itinerant MBA courses throughout the republic.

The building where IPADE holds its Mexico City campus is the 17th century Hacienda de San Antonio Clavería.

== Rankings ==
IPADE is ranked by many leading business publications as one of the best MBAs in the world.

- 1st in Latin America in 2010 QS Global 200 Business Schools Report.
- Forbes magazine, top 5 best ROI Full Time MBA, July 2009.
- Expansion Magazine (from CNN) rated IPADE as the best MBA in Mexico since 2011.
- According to the Wall Street Journal's 2007 ranking, IPADE was the fourth best 'international' business school (defined as a school rated highly by employers outside the United States), just after London Business School and after IMD and ESADE.
- IPADE was the 5th best international MBA (two-year program) in 2007 ranking at Forbes and the 1st in Latin America.
- The Financial Times, in May 2007, ranking the school's New Skills and Learning at first highly, reflecting the salary of incoming students; the school ranked highly for salary increase and career progress. In the same year, it ranked the school 14th worldwide for Directive Perfection Programs.
- According to the Financial Times, IPADE is one of the top business schools in Latin America, mainly due to personalized executive education programs. The students were particularly enthusiastic about the motivation of the employees after finishing the courses and the humanistic perspective of the programs.

== History of the Hacienda of San Antonio Clavería ==
The Hacienda of San Antonio Clavería was formed in the last third of the 17th century. Its first proprietor to be known was Domingo Bustamante, a Spaniard. This hacienda was in the limits of the borough of Azcapotzalco (in those days the pueblo Azcapotzalco) and even the Tacuba area. When Bustamante died, the Hacienda was bought by a man surnamed Otero for a large sum of money.

The hacienda barely managed to stand the fierce wars in Mexico in the 19th century. By the 20th, it was converted into a wheat barn, which didn't help the building's architecture.

It was restored in 1951. The institute arrived in 1967.

== Graduate programs ==
- Senior Management Programs AD/AD2
- MBA (full-time)
- EMBA (two days per week)
- Special Management Programs

== Academic areas ==
- Decision Analysis
- Commercialization
- Control and Managerial Information
- Finance Direction
- Operations Direction
- Human Resources Direction
- Family Enterprise
- Political Environment
- Economical Environment
- Human & Organizational Behavior
- Enterprise Philosophy
- Business Policy
