= Ignacy =

Ignacy is a Polish given name, equivalent of the name Ignatius. Notable people with the name include:

- Ignacy Tadeusz Baranowski (1879–1917), Polish historian
- Piotr Ignacy Bieńkowski (1865–1925), Polish classical scholar and archaeologist, professor of Jagiellonian University
- Ignacy Bohusz (1720–1778), noble in the Polish-Lithuanian Commonwealth
- Ignacy Daszyński (1866–1936), Polish politician, journalist and Prime Minister of the Polish government created in Lublin in 1918
- Ignacy Domeyko (1802–1889), 19th-century geologist, mineralogist and educator
- Ignacy Działyński (1754–1797), Polish nobleman known for his participation in the Warsaw Uprising of 1794
- Ignacy Feliks Dobrzyński (1807–1867), Polish pianist and composer
- Ignacy Hryniewiecki (1856–1881), member of the People's Will and the assassin of Tsar Alexander II of Russia
- Ignacy Jeż (1914–2007), the Latin Rite Catholic Bishop Emeritus of Koszalin-Kołobrzeg, Poland
- Henryk Ignacy Kamieński (1777–1831), Polish brigadier general
- Ignacy Krasicki (1735–1801), Primate of Poland, playwright, journalist, encyclopedist and Poland's leading Enlightenment poet
- Józef Ignacy Kraszewski (1812–1887), Polish writer, historian and journalist
- Ignacy Kruszewski (1799–1879), Polish military leader
- Jakub Ignacy Łaszczyński (24 July 1791 – 18 September 1865), Polish regional administrator and President of Warsaw
- Ignacy Ledóchowski I (1789–1870), Austrian as well as Polish General, a scion of the Ledóchowski family and Commander of the Fortress Modlin
- Ignacy Liss (born 1998), Polish actor
- Aleksander Ignacy Lubomirski (1802–1893), Polish noble, financier and philanthropist
- Jerzy Ignacy Lubomirski (1687–1753), Polish nobleman
- Ignacy Łukasiewicz (1822–1882), Polish pharmacist and petroleum industry pioneer who in 1856 built the first oil refinery in the world
- Ignacy Ścibor Marchocki (1755–1827), Polish noble, famous in the first quarter of the nineteenth century
- Ignacy Jakub Massalski (1726–1794), Polish-Lithuanian nobleman
- Ignacy Mościcki (1867–1946), Polish chemist, politician, and President of Poland (1926–39)
- Ignacy Nagurczewski (1725–1811), Polish writer, translator, educator, and Jesuit
- Ignacy Oziewicz (1887–1966), Polish general in World War II, received the Cross of Valour (Poland) four times
- Ignacy Jan Paderewski GBE (1860–1941), Polish pianist, composer, diplomat, politician, and the second Prime Minister of the Republic of Poland
- Ignacy Pieńkowski (1877–1948), Polish painter and pedagogue active primarily in Kraków
- Roman Ignacy Potocki (1750–1809), Polish nobleman, politician and writer
- Ignacy Prądzyński (1792–1850), Polish military commander and a general of the Polish Army
- Ignacy Sachs (Warsaw, 1927–2023), Polish, naturalized French economist
- Ignacy Schwarzbart (1888–1961), prominent Polish Zionist
- Ignacy Szymański (1806–1874), Polish and American soldier
- Ignacy Tłoczyński (1911–2000), Polish tennis player
- Ignacy Tokarczuk (1918–2012), Polish prelate of the Roman Catholic Church
- Ignacy Witczak, GRU Illegal officer in the United States during World War II
- Stanisław Ignacy Witkiewicz (1885–1939), Polish playwright, novelist, painter, photographer and philosopher
- Adam Ignacy Zabellewicz (1784–1831), professor of philosophy at Warsaw University
- Ignacy Zaborowski (1754–1803), Polish mathematician and geodesist
- Ignacy Żagiell (1826–1891), physician, traveler and Polish-language writer
- Ignacy Wyssogota Zakrzewski (1745–1802), notable Polish nobleman and politician during the last years of the Polish-Lithuanian Commonwealth

== See also ==
- Bydgoszcz Ignacy Jan Paderewski Airport (IATA: BZG, ICAO: EPBY), a Polish regional airport in the city of Bydgoszcz, Poland
