= Jasło =

Town in Subcarpathian Voivodeship, Poland

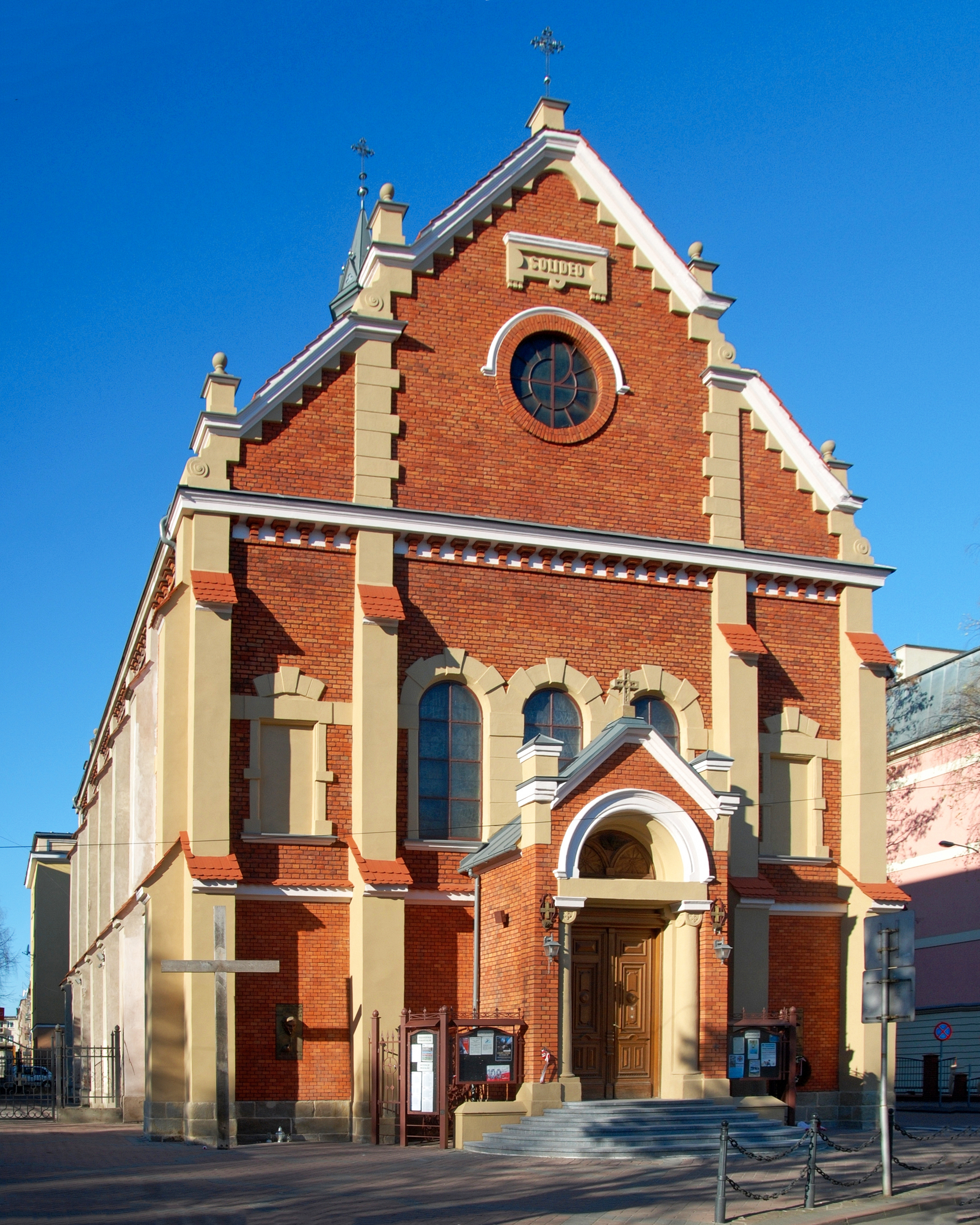
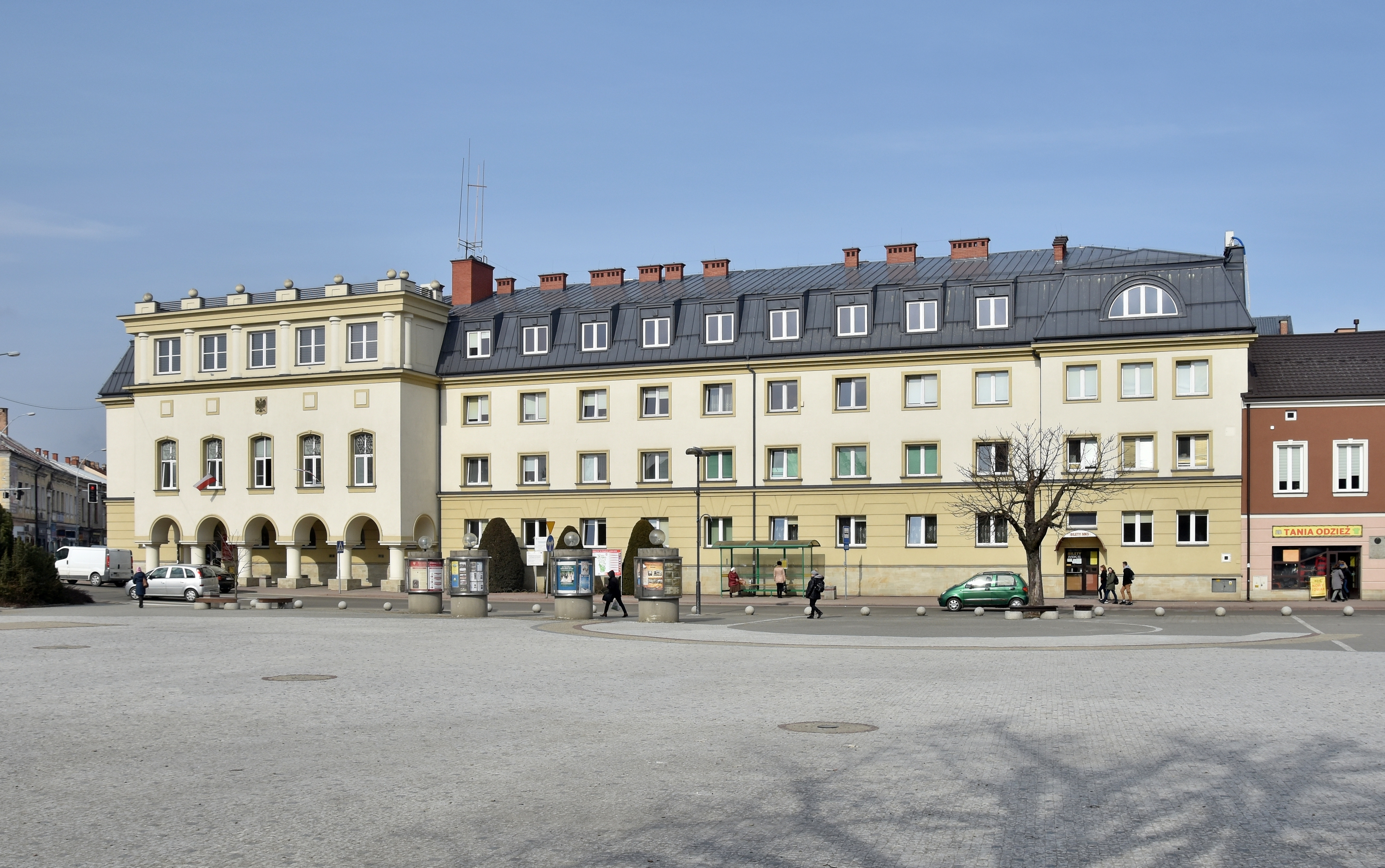
- Saint Anthony Square St. Stanislaus church County office

- Flag Coat of arms

- Location within Poland
- Coordinates: 49°44′52″N 21°28′17″E
- Country: Poland
- Voivodeship: Subcarpathian
- County: Jasło
- Gmina: Jasło (urban gmina)
- Established: 12th century
- Town rights: 1365

Government
  - Mayor: Adam Kostrząb

Area
  - Total: 36.52 km^{2} (14.10 sq mi)
- Highest elevation: 380 m (1,250 ft)
- Lowest elevation: 225 m (738 ft)

Population (2012)
  - Total: 36,641
  - Density: 1,003/km^{2} (2,599/sq mi)
- Time zone: UTC+1 (CET)
  - Summer (DST): UTC+2 (CEST)
- Postal code: 38-200 to 38-211
- Area code: +48 13
- Car plates: RJS
- Website: http://www.jaslo.pl/

Jasło [ˈjaswɔ] is a town in Subcarpathian Voivodeship, south-eastern Poland with 36,641 inhabitants, as of 31 December 2012. It is situated in the Subcarpathian Voivodeship (since 1999), and it was previously part of Krosno Voivodeship (1975–1998). It is located in Lesser Poland, in the heartland of the Doły (Pits), and its average altitude is 320 metres above sea level, although there are some hills located within the confines of the city. The Patron Saint of the city is Saint Anthony of Padua.

== History ==
=== Medieval period ===
Gothic Church of the Assumption

In the early days of Polish statehood, Jasło was part of the Castellany of Biecz, out of which Biecz County emerged in the 14th century. A list of rectories, created for collecting tithes, a church in "Jassel" in Zręcin deanery, Kraków diocese, is shown in 1328. The area of the future town belonged to a Cistercian Abbey from Koprzywnica, and by the mid 13th century, Jasło, known then as Jasiel or Jasiol, had a fair of local importance. Together with a number of other locations in Lesser Poland, the village was granted Magdeburg rights by King Casimir III the Great, on April 23, 1366. In 1368 the king made a transaction with the Cistercian monks - in exchange for the town of Frysztak, and the villages of Glinik and Kobyle, Jasło became a royal town. It already had a parish church, founded before 1325 by King Władysław I the Elbow-high. The parish had a school, and in the mid-14th century, Carmelite brothers came to the town. According to Dlugosz in Liber beneficiorum Dioecesis cracoviensis, the church that stands today was built by brothers Stanislaw Cielatko (Czelanthco), Sandomierz scholastic, and Mikolaj of Ciołek arms, in 1446. This occurred because the original was destroyed by the Hungarians. The coats of arms of Strzemie, Trąby, Gryf, Janina, and Pobóg are on the vault of the church, and because of this, the Slownik Geograficzny suggests these may be noble houses that contributed to the development.

=== Early modern period ===
The Polish Golden Age was a period of prosperity for both Lesser Poland and Jasło, which belonged to Kraków Voivodeship of the Lesser Poland Province. The town was challenged at the start of the period; in 1474, the King of Hungary, Matthias Corvinus, burned Jasło in his assault of the foothills of the Carpathians. After this, the town grew, but it never became an important urban location of this part of the country. It had a number of artisans, several fairs and markets. Local merchants traded with both Polish and foreign merchants, mostly from the Kingdom of Hungary, taking advantage of the vicinity of the border. In 1550, Joachim Lubomirski, a courtier of King Sigismund II Augustus, and his lineage, was given Jasło, after it was converted to a starostwo. When referring the details of a 1564 town inspection, the Slownik Geograficzny described: "Judging by the number of bakers and cobblers, one must conclude that the town was significantly larger than today." This is about the Jasło of around 1902, with 2,962 inhabitants at that later time. Jasło was given to Mikołaj Struś by King Sigismund III of Poland in 1613. He revived the town and strengthened the prohibition against Jews, "because they hinder the townsmen in trade and buy up all the victuals," as described Strus, according to the Slownik Geograficzny.

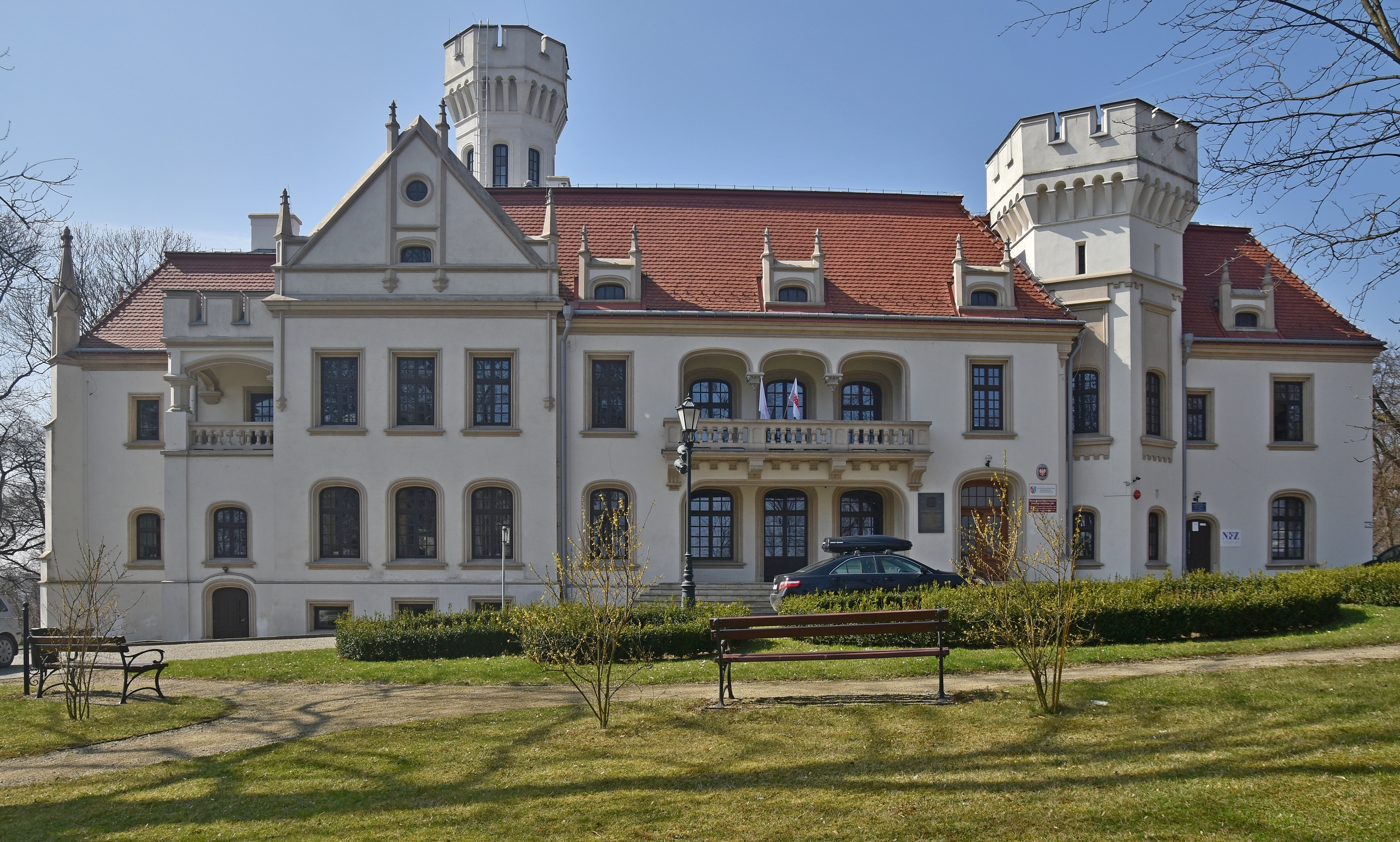
Sroczyński Palace

Good times ended in the 1650s. In 1655, the town was captured and destroyed by the Swedes (see the Deluge), in 1657 – by the Transilvanians of George II Rakoczi, and in the first years of the 18th century - again by Swedish troops of King Charles XII of Sweden (see Great Northern War). Additionally, destructive fires occurred in Jasło in 1683, 1755, and 1826, which likely slowed development of the city. The town was destroyed once again by the Russians during the Bar Confederation.

Adam Tarlo became the starosta of Jasło in 1733, and Jedrzej Moszczenski was the next starosta to take office. The starosta lived in a castle in Krajowice, since Jasło had no walls or castle; no traditional castle ruins exist in Jaslo. A monastery and church of the Carmelites also existed in Jasło. The Slownik Geograficzny suggests that it was probably founded before 1437. A well, which St. Wojciech supposedly blessed while traveling from Hungary, existed in the church, which drew pilgrims to the town. The monastery was changed to an office for the starosta in 1786, the well cannot be found today.

=== Late modern period ===
In 1772, after the First Partition of Poland, Jasło was annexed by Austria, and made part of Galicia. In 1790, the town became the seat of a district, which had been moved here from Dukla. Several Austrian civil servants came here, and office buildings, with a new town hall, courthouse, prison and schools were built. Several houses in the market square burned in the 1826 fire, which resulted in a construction boom, and in early 1846, farmers from villages around Jasło took part in the Galician peasant revolt. On June 12, 1846, the Galician riots bred a wave of anti-Jewish riots, which swept through the city, injuring and destroying the property of many of the native Jews. Very close to Jasło, the spirit refinery of Jacob Frant was burnt down. Fire-fighting utilities were ordered not to extinguish the fires by the district captain that arrived at the scene, and other authorities did not intervene. The city and surrounding villages were reported to contain six thousand inhabitants at this time, and a quarter of that population was Jewish, according to the special correspondent of The Jewish World newspaper at the time. One of the clerics that mobilized the peasantry in the following 1848 anti-Austrian rising was Father Karol Szlegal from near Jasło.

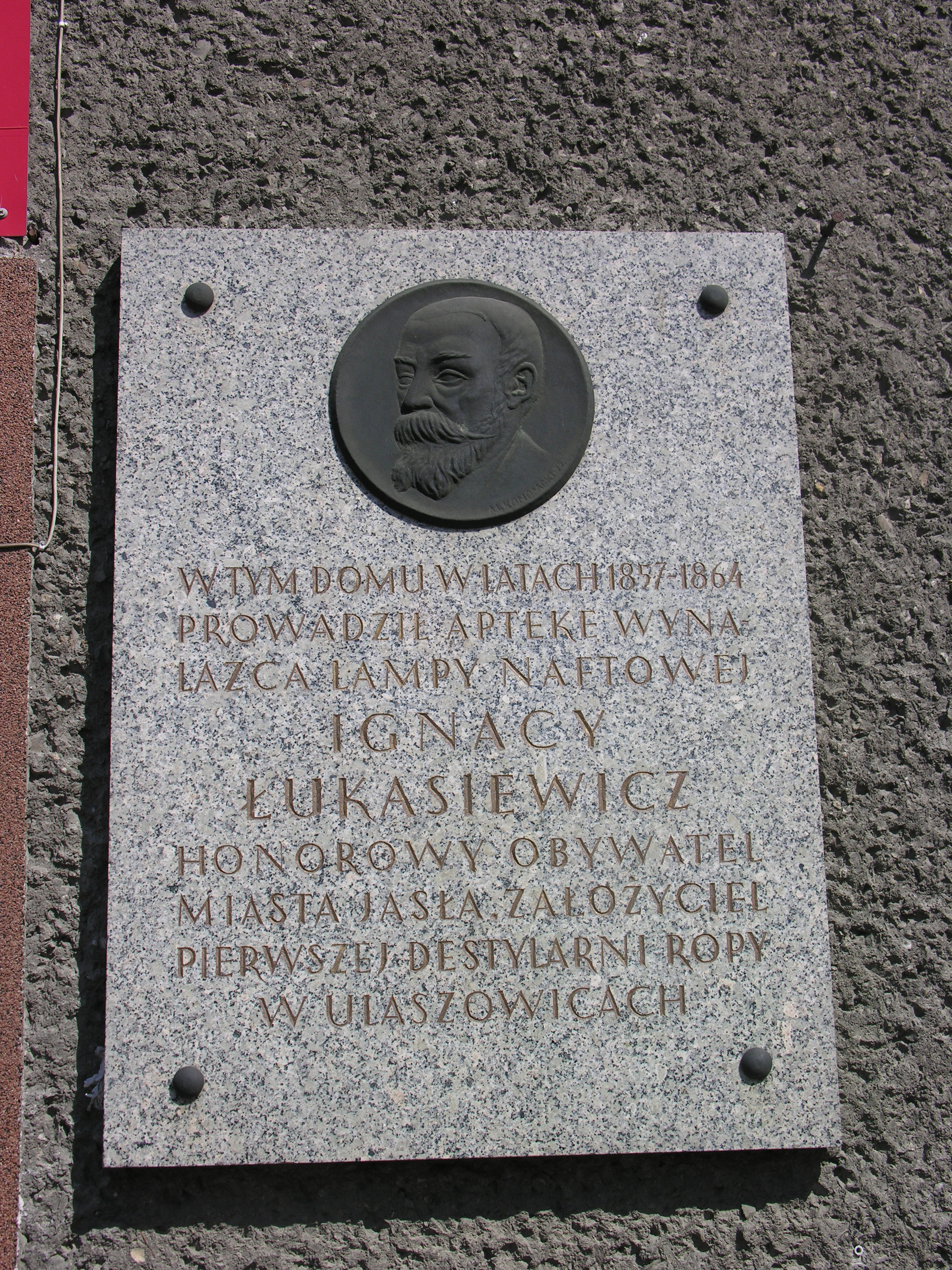
Memorial plaque at the former pharmacy of Ignacy Łukasiewicz

Between 1840 and 1849, the city maintained a population of about 1950 individuals, according to census data included in the Dictionary of Geography. In 1858, Ignacy Łukasiewicz, a world-renowned inventor, moved to Jasło. Due to his pioneering work, an oil well was constructed in Niegłowice near Jasło (1889–1890). Near Jasło and the nearby town of Krosno, other crude-oil refineries were established in the mid-late 1800s. At approximately same time, a rail line from Stróże to Zagórz was constructed (1872-1884), with additional connection from Jasło to Rzeszów opened in 1890. "The Parish of Christ's Crucifixion,” which resides at the cemetery, was established in 1862. In 1860, the Austrian Imperial administration again declared the right for Jews to live inside the confines of Jasło. Afterwards, the Jewish population rapidly increased, ingraining itself in the financial and commercial sectors of the city and nearby areas.

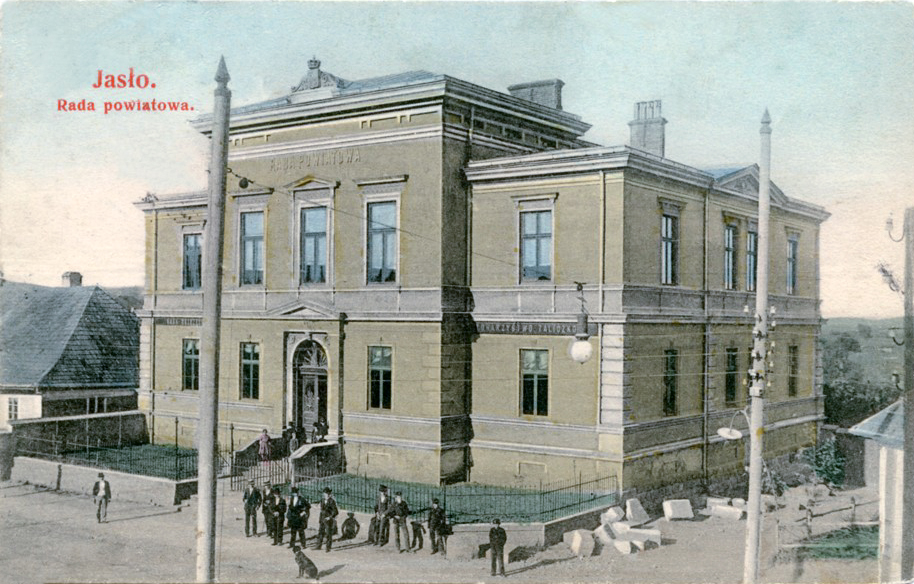
Jasło County Council in 1900

In the early 20th century, the population of Jasło was 10,000. The town was well-kept and clean, a power plant was built in 1897, then a municipal park was opened, and in September 1900, Jasło was visited by Emperor Franz Joseph of Austria. Between 1880 and 1902, agriculture and cloth manufacturing were the common main occupations in the area around the city. Around 1910, the priest Kisevsky and his six gendarmes persecuted Eastern Orthodox peasants by fining them on trivial pretexts, and many were taken to the court in Jasło to receive their sentences. A Jewish lawyer represented the Orthodox peasants, and described that the Jews in the area were not persecuted for handling lit candles openly, for which the Orthodox peasants were fined. The Ukrainian national group known as the Prosvita (Enlightenment) Society developed affiliates in Jasło between 1893 and 1903. By 1914, the Society spread to 22 Lemko villages, and promoted Ukrainian national ideology, identity, and language.

=== World War I to World War II ===
Several World War I battles took place in the area of Jasło, but the town itself was not destroyed. The city was taken behind the Russian front. Railroads ran from Sanok to Jasło and from Jasło to Przemysl, which the occupying Russian forces relied on for transportation of food, munitions, and troops through the front. In May 1915, in the Gorlice–Tarnów Offensive, Russian forces were pushed back by the Germans, who entered Jasło on May 6, 1915, at 22:30. Prussian commander August von Mackensen moved his headquarters to Jasło the following morning, after the line was pushed back several miles beyond the city. Following the war, in 1918, Poland regained independence and control of the town.

In the Second Polish Republic, Jasło was the seat of a county in Kraków Voivodeship. For most part of the interwar period, unemployment and poverty were prevalent, and the situation began slowly to improve in the late 1930s, after creation of the Central Industrial Region. In 1937, Gamrat chemical plant was opened, but all efforts were destroyed in the German invasion of Poland, which started World War II in September 1939.

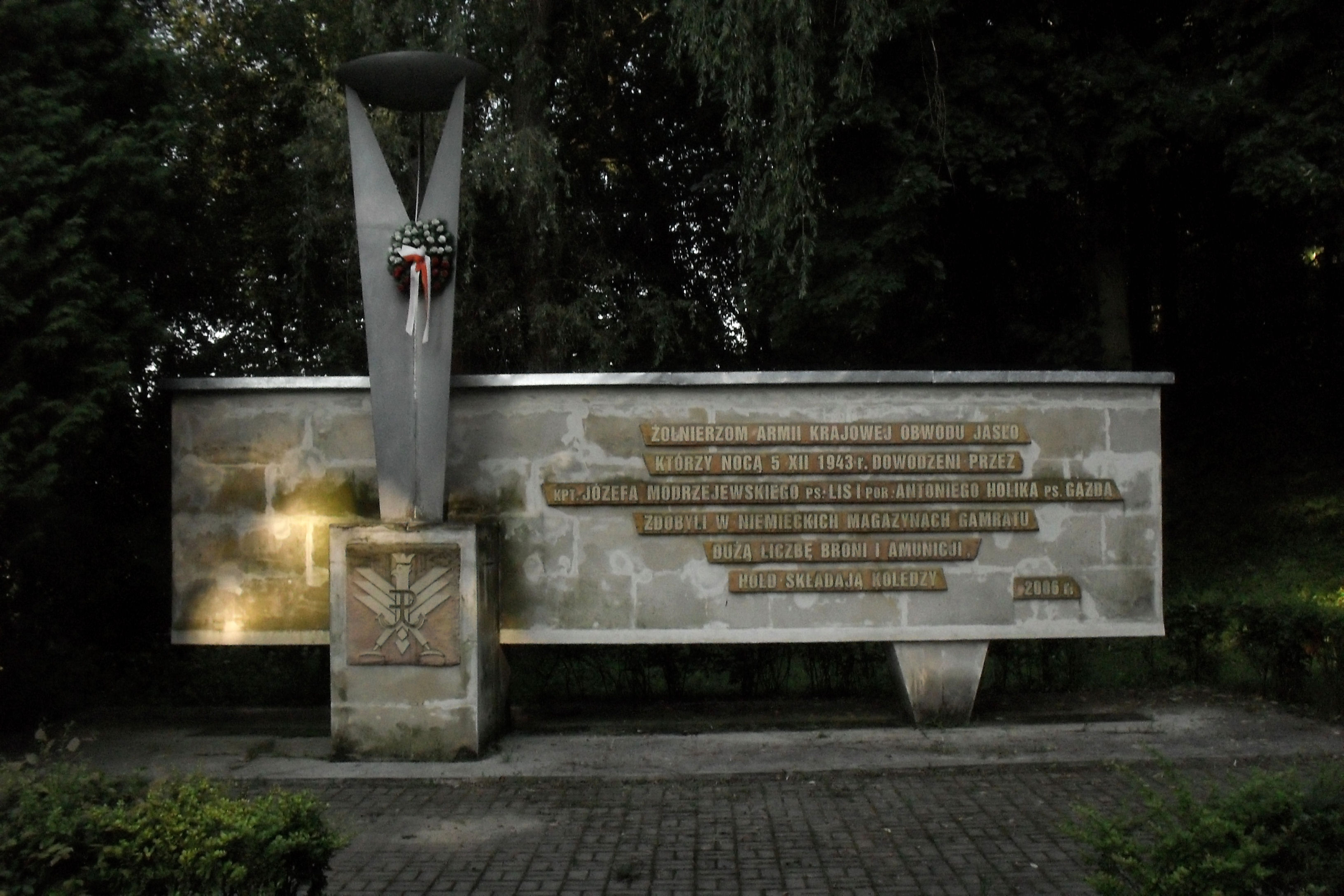
Monument commemorating the successful Kedyw operation from 5 August 1943

Under German occupation Jasło belonged to the General Government, and was an important center of the Polish resistance movement. At the turn of 1939 and 1940, 93 Poles who tried to cross the border to find refuge in Hungary were imprisoned by the Germans in Jasło, and then massacred in the nearby village of Sieklówka (see Nazi crimes against the Polish nation). 27 Poles born in Jasło, as well as other Poles who lived or studied in the town, were murdered by the Russians in the large Katyn massacre in April–May 1940. In the night of August 5/6, 1943, the Kedyw carried out a successful attack on the local prison. Poles who rescued Jews from the Holocaust, were tied up with Jews by the Germans and deported with them. In September and October 1944, after the Soviet–German frontline was established, and remained unchanged for several months, the Germans began expulsion of all inhabitants of Jasło, as the town was located on the front line. In the late autumn of 1944, Wehrmacht units burned the whole town, as the occupying German administration ordered the town to be destroyed, and as a result, 90% of Jasło was destroyed. It was one of the most destroyed Polish towns. In January 1945, only 365 people dwelled among the ruins of the town.

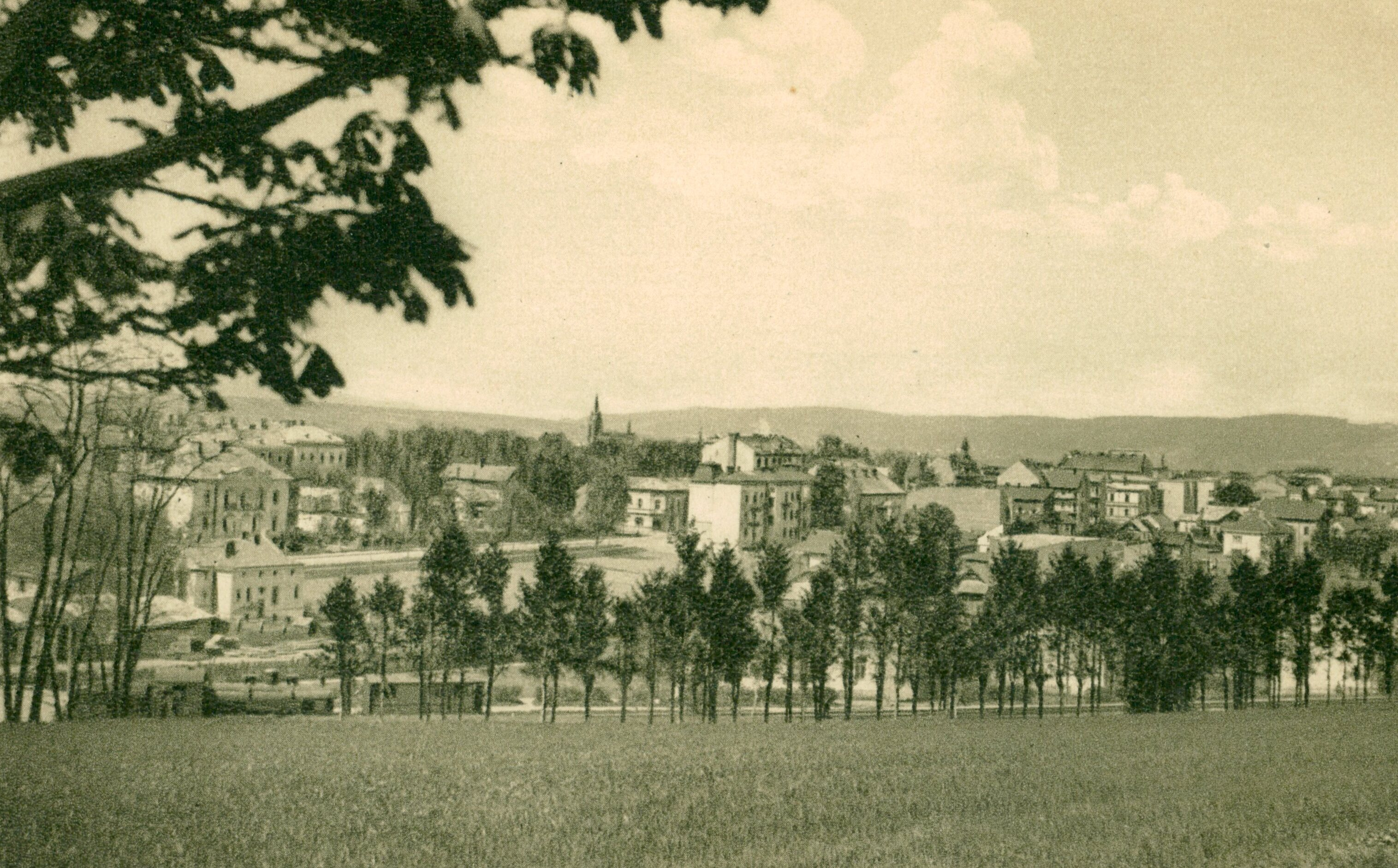
Jasło, before 1930

Market square, before WW2

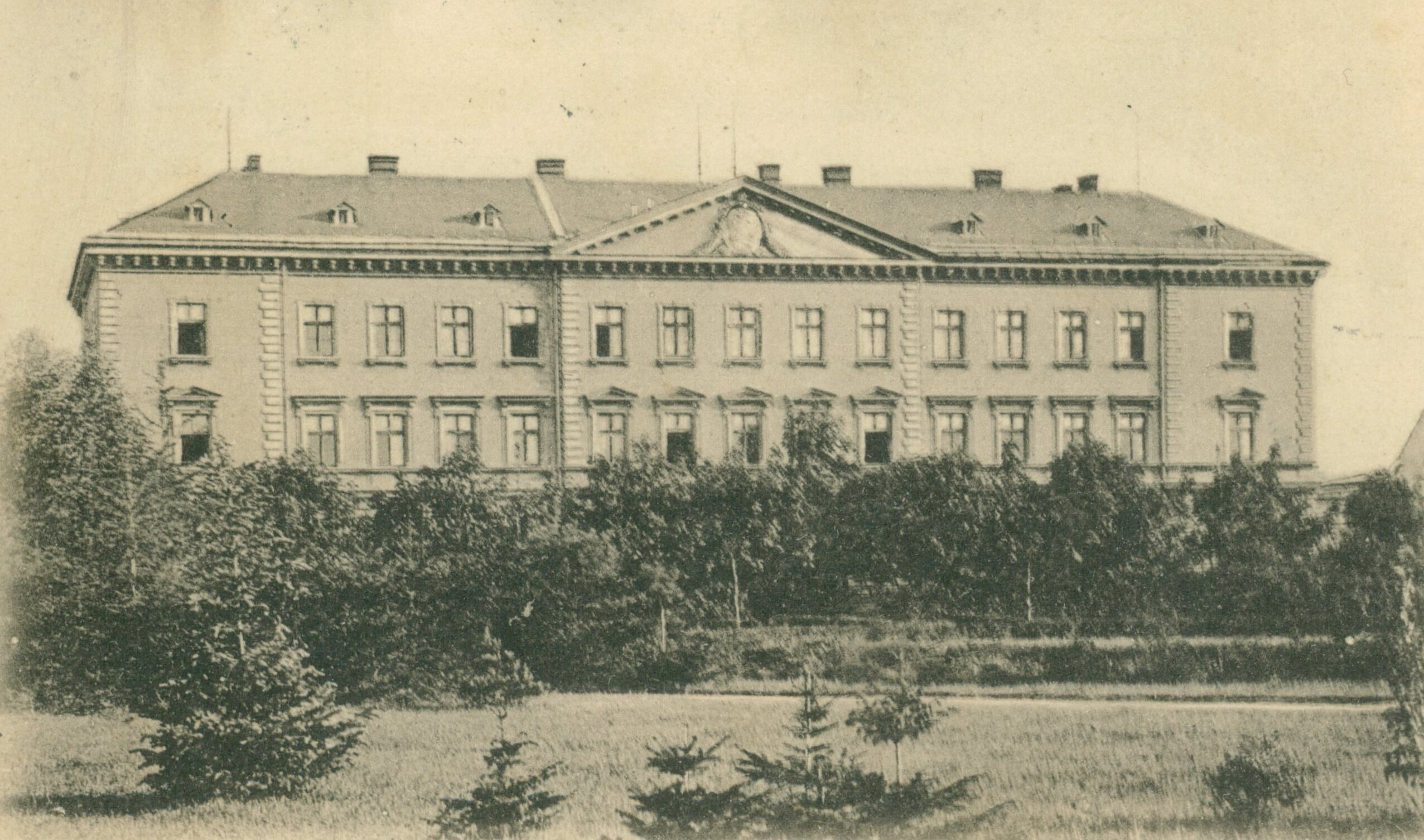
Court, 1900

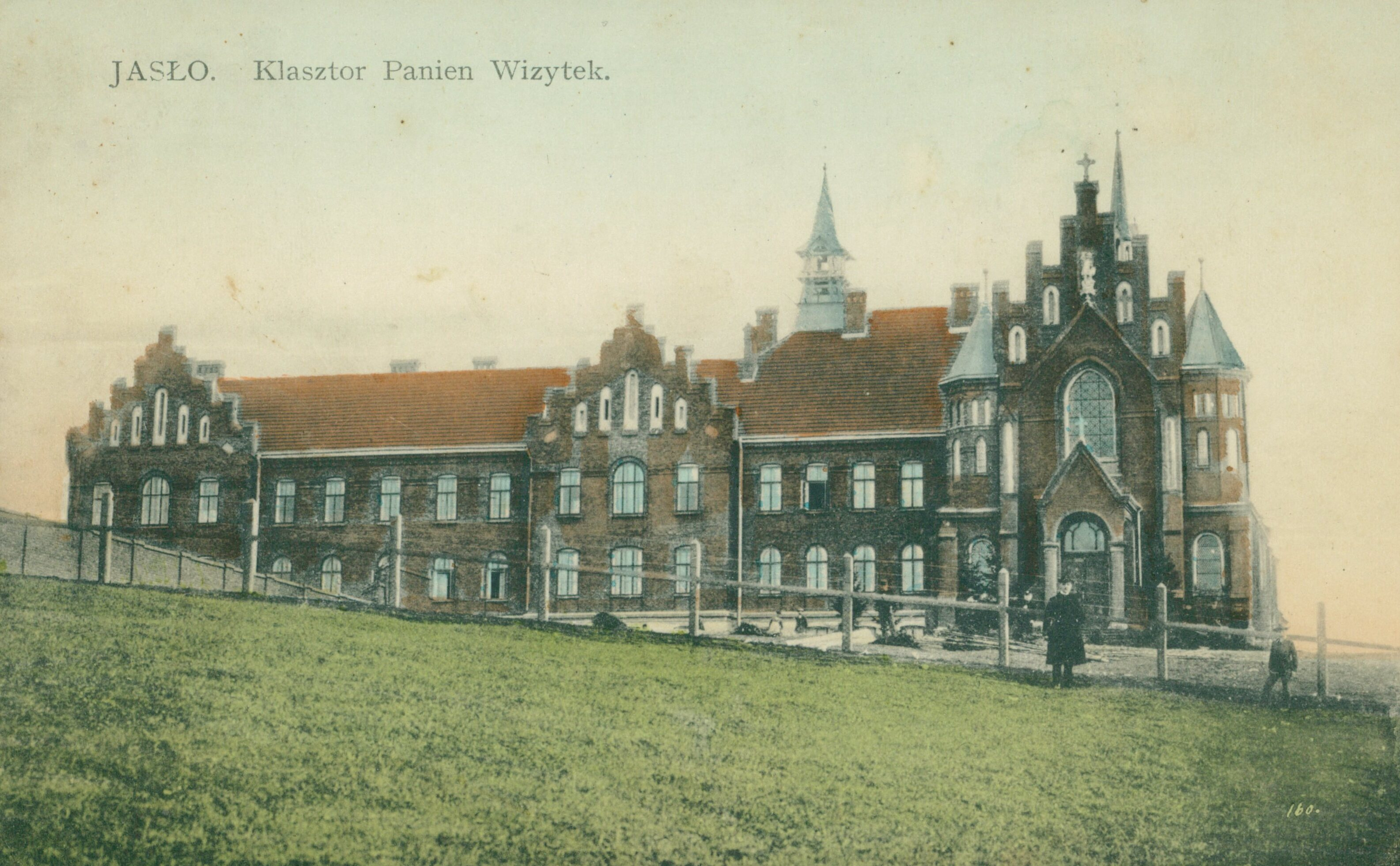
Visitation monastery, 1917

== Etymology ==
The name derives from Old Polish common word for the "manger" or "trough [trof]" which sounded "jasło" < *jesło (before the Lechitic umlaut). Plausibly, it comes from the Slavonic verb "to eat" - "jeść" < *jesti. The Modern Polish equivalent is "żłób" or more seldom "koryto" and the word "jasło" is forgotten in this meaning. The Germanized version was Jassel or Jessel which appeared in 1325.

== Transport ==
Jasło is an important railroad junction of southeastern Poland, with trains going into three directions - eastwards (to Zagórz), westwards (to Stróże) and northeast, to Rzeszów. Another line, along the Wisłoka to Dębica, was planned in the interebellum period. Construction on it began in 1938, but it was never completed because of World War II.

== Education ==
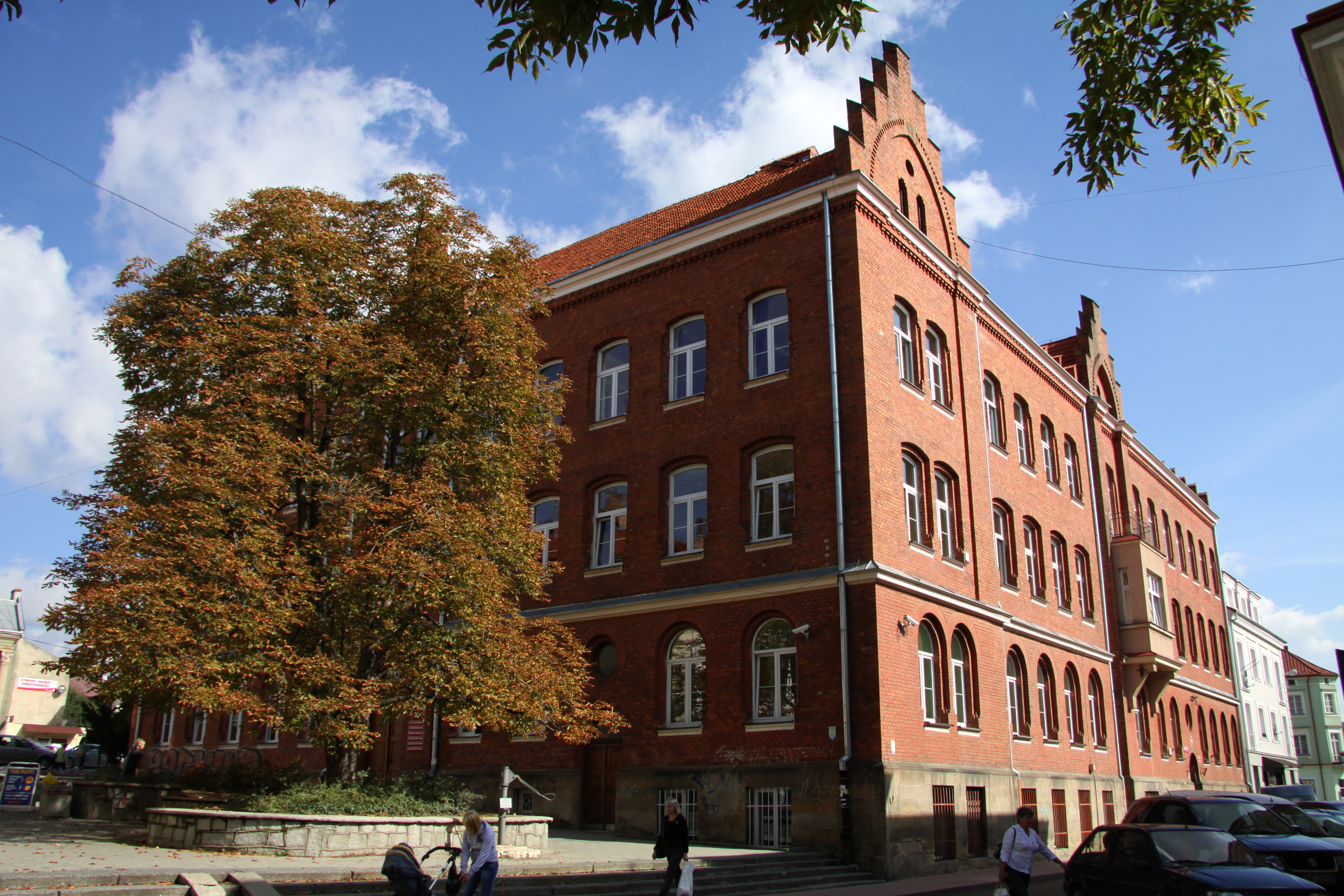
High School in Jasło

- Podkarpacka Szkoła Wyższa

== Sports ==
Jasło is home to a sports club Czarni Jasło, founded in 1910.

== Churches of Jasło ==
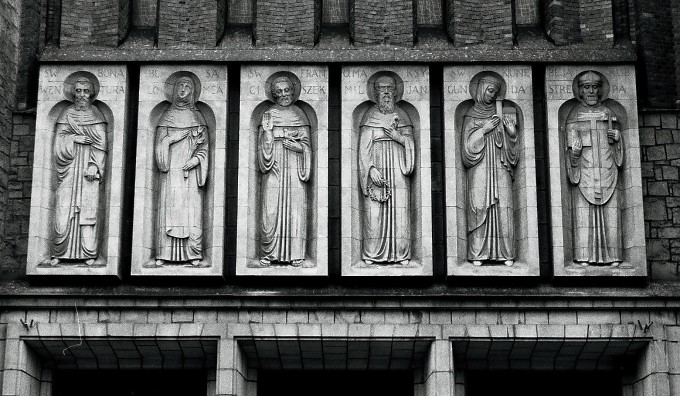
Façade of St. Anthony's Church in Jasło

Jasło has a population that includes Roman Catholics, Greek Catholics, non-Catholics (mostly Protestants), and a small Jewish population. However, it is mainly Roman Catholic, and contains 9 Catholic Churches.

- Św. Antoniego Padewskiego
- Chrystusa Króla
- Dobrego Pasterza
- Matki Bożej Królowej Świata
- Miłosierdzia Bożego
- Najświętszego Serca Pana Jezusa
- Świętego Stanisława
- Wniebowzięcia Najświętszej Marii Panny
- Matki Bożej Częstochowskiej

== Notable people ==
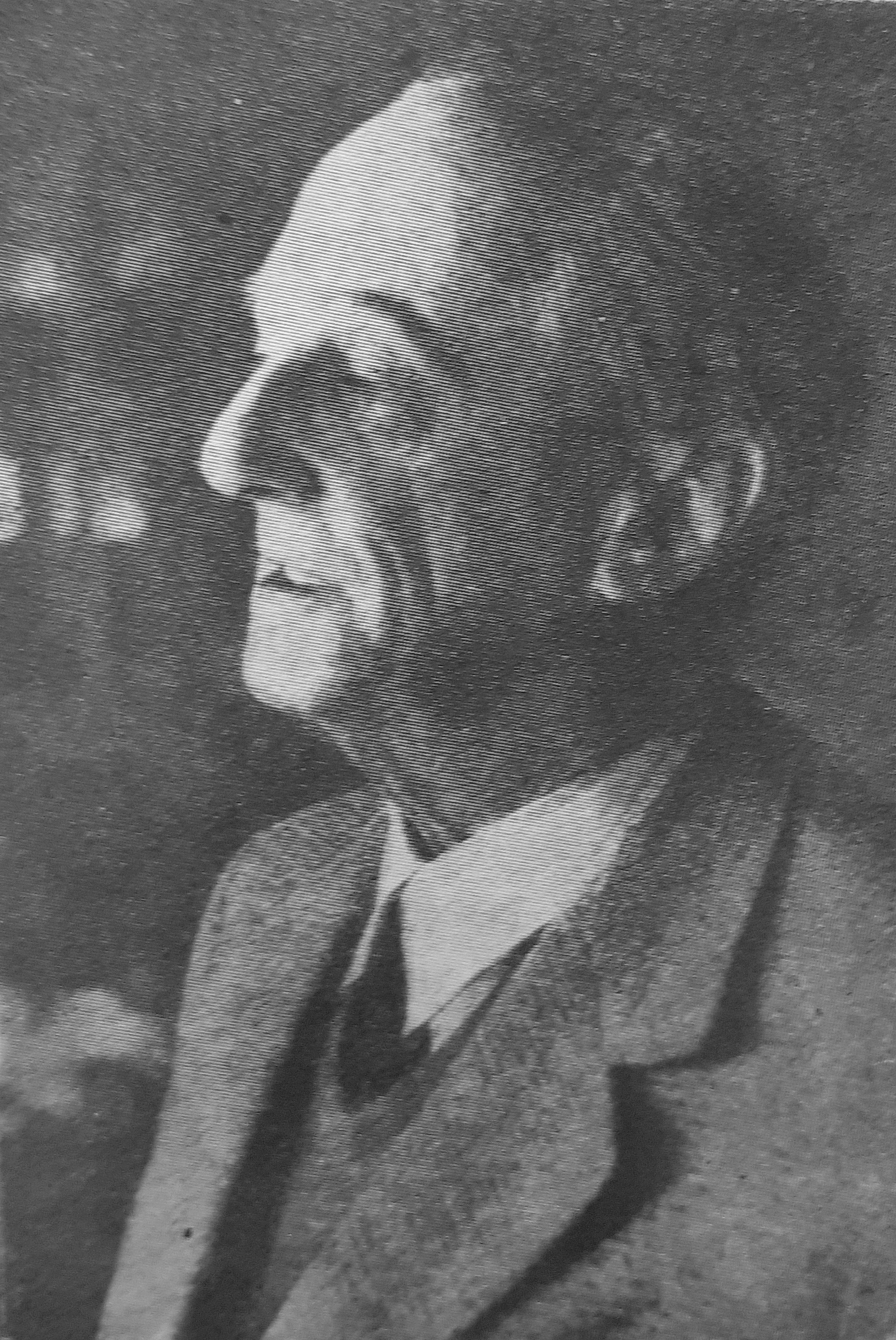
Hugo Steinhaus

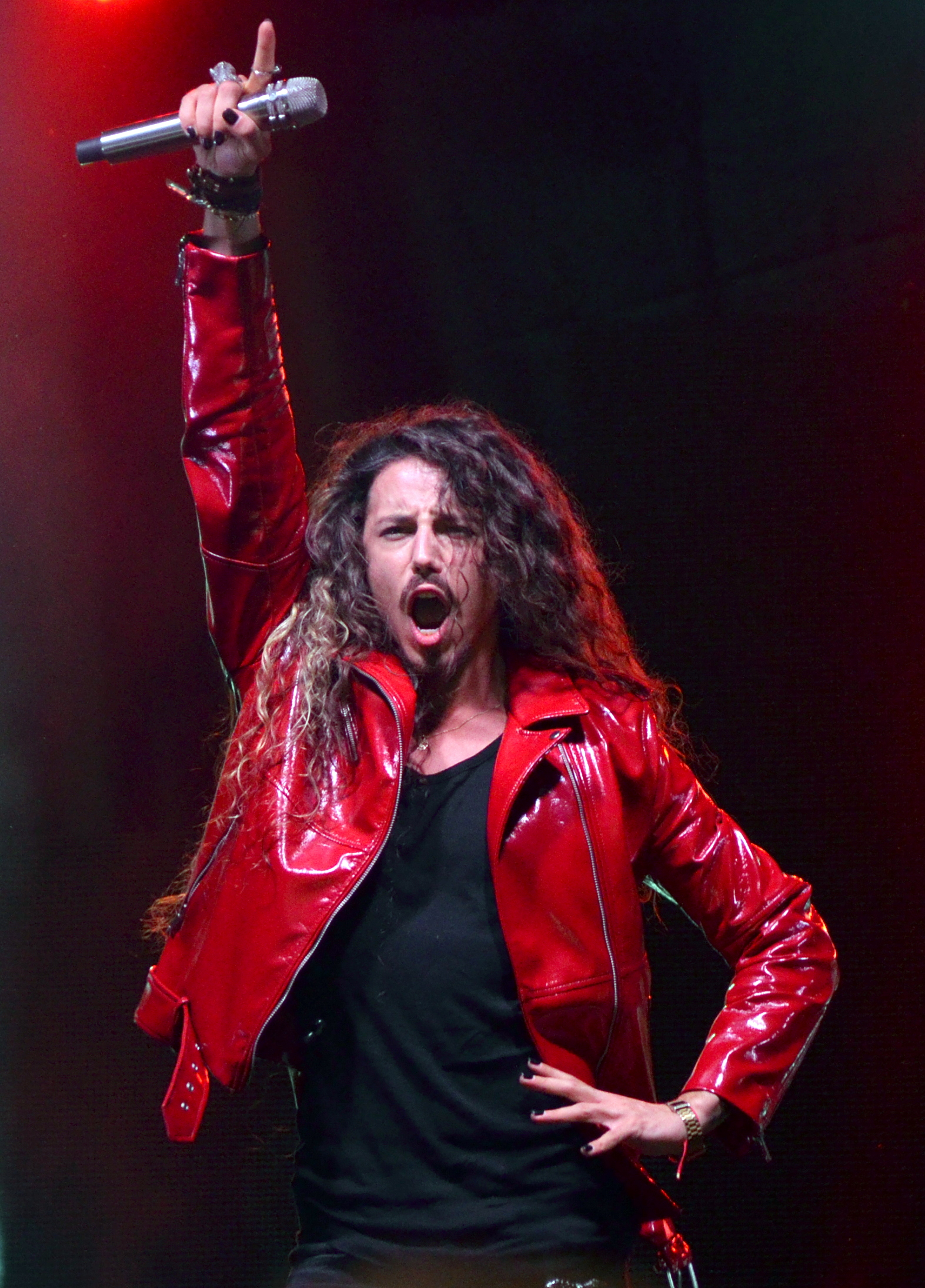
Michał Szpak

- Henryk Dobrzański (1897–1940) – soldier
- Piotr Feliks (1883–1941) – activist
- Cezary Geroń (1960–1998) – poet
- Yoel Halpern (1904-1983) – rabbi
- Karol Irzykowski (1873–1944) – writer and critic
- Piotr Jaroszewicz (1909–1992) – politician
- Ralph Kaminski (born 1990) – singer
- Tadeusz Klimecki (1895–1943) – soldier and political aide
- Janusz Kołodziej (born 1959) – politician
- Cecilia Krieger (1894–1974) – Austro-Hungarian mathematician
- Ignacy Kruszewski (1799–1879) – military leader
- Elżbieta Łukacijewska (born 1966) – politician
- Ignacy Łukasiewicz (1822–1882) – inventor, pharmacist, businessman, philanthropist, pioneer of the oil industry
- Karol Myśliwiec (born 1942) – archeologist
- Sławomir Peszko (born 1985) – footballer
- Kamil Piątkowski (born 2000) – footballer
- Hugo Steinhaus (1887–1972) – Jewish-Polish mathematician
- Michał Szpak (born 1990) – singer
- Adam Tarło (1713–1744) – nobleman
- Jan Tarło (1684–1750) – nobleman
- Roksana Węgiel (born 2005) – singer (Winner of Junior Eurovision Song Contest 2018)
- Paweł Zagumny (born 1977) – volleyball player
- Jerzy Żuławski (1874–1915) – writer
- Zyndram of Maszkowice (1355–1414) – Polish knight

== International relations ==
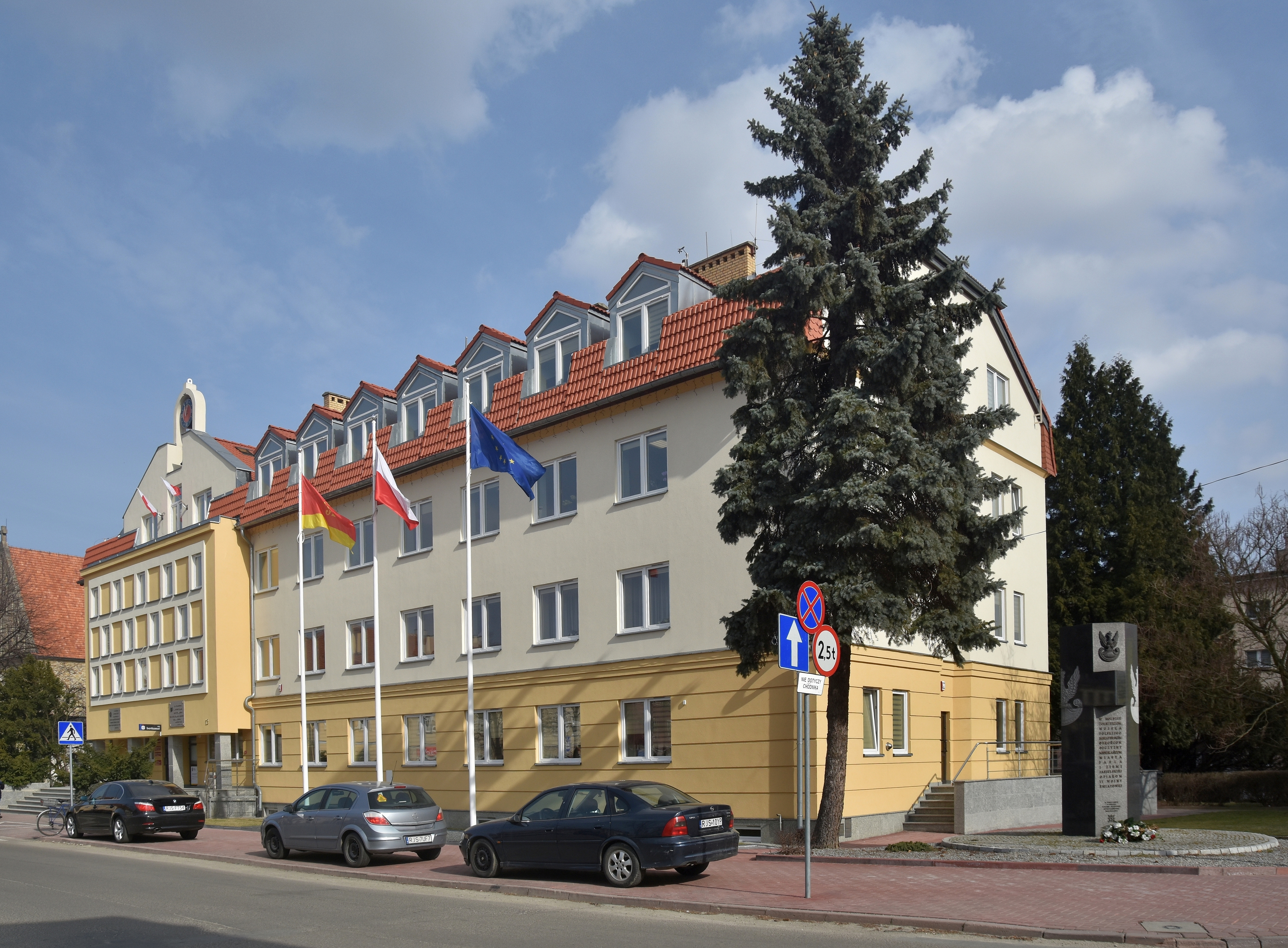
Town Hall

=== Twin towns — Sister cities ===
Jasło is twinned with:

Makó, Hungary, since June 1998; Trebišov, Slovakia, since June 2006; Bardejov, Slovakia, since 1999; Truskavets, Ukraine, since August 2005	Hodonín, Czech Republic, since May 2006; Camposampiero, Italy, since November 2002; Prague 10, Czech Republic, since 12 May 2008

- Sárospatak, Hungary

== See also ==
- History of the Jews of Jasło
