= Janusz Kołodziej =

Janusz Kołodziej may refer to:

- Janusz Kołodziej (politician) (born 1959), Polish politician
- Janusz Kołodziej (speedway rider) (born 1984), Polish motorcycle speedway rider
