= History of the Jews of Jasło =

Jas~~l~~o is a town in southeastern Poland founded in the 12th century. It is currently located in the Subcarpathian Voivodeship and was previously part of the Krosno Voivodeship (1975-1998). It is 33 kilometers northeast of Gorlice. Until 1870, there was a ban on Jewish life. This policy was abolished, and the city slogan "Jas~~l~~o the free city," was adopted. The name Jas~~l~~o is derived from the small river named Jasiolka that begins to flow near the town of Jasliska and eventually joins the Wisloka river. The town itself in the current day is known for having single-story brick houses, a marketplace, and large gardens that were present from the foundation of the early Jewish settlers in 1870.

== History of the Jews of Jaslo (Pre-1939) ==
The first Jews in Jas~~l~~o, following the adoption of the new Austrian constitution, came from the village of Ulaszowice. These first Jews wanted to remain close to the old Jewish center of Ulaszowice, so they built their homes in the middle of the Targowica town square. The center of religious and cultural life was concentrated around Shajnochy Street. There was a bath house and study center located there.

By the end of 1870, there were about 30 Jewish families. At this time, a sickness epidemic circulated the community, and the Jews left the place in search of prayer and guidance. They frequently prayed near caves and the first Rabbi of Jas~~l~~o was confirmed during this time. His name was Rabbi Yona Tzanger. He died just two years after his confirmation. The Jews returned to Jas~~l~~o and the study center and a home for the Rabbi were built. In 1883, the community purchased another building near the study center, and opened it as a synagogue. Rabbi Rubin, who became Rabbi following Rabbi Tzanger's death began to have trouble with various community members, and moved to Palestine to retire in 1888. A new Rabbi was confirmed named Rabbi Tziv Yossef.

Under Rabbi Tziv Yossef, the community grew to hundreds of families that began to grow the local economy. A railway station was opened during this time period, and eventually would connect Jas~~l~~o to Rzeszow. A high school was built and an oil refinery was constructed near the Wisloka River. There were two high schools built eventually: a public one for the boys and a second private one for the girls. There were confirmed accounts of anti-Semitism in the boys school, and there may have been instances of anti-Semitism in the girls school.

Jas~~l~~o was a district city, so there was a judicial court in the center of the city. Jewish attorneys were prevalent in the city, and this led to tenements being constructed and other buildings to ensure that there was enough space in the city. There were a large number of educated Jews, and this paired with the cleanliness of the city contributed to it having a modern image.

In 1898, an anti-Jewish campaign was presented by the "Peasant's Party". A mob was created, and they burned down a Jewish home and also the distillery of the city. Property worth 80,000 Polish Zloty was destroyed in the incident.

In 1914, the Russians occupied the city for four days. The Jews suffered during this time period at the hands of the central powers and government. During this time period, Austrian planes would occasionally bomb the city. The government also began to restrict trade in an anti-Jewish nature. As the war worsened, Jews were continuously blamed for the predicament of the rest of the citizens of Jas~~l~~o. This led to anti-Jewish attacks from citizens. The Austria-Hungarian empire collapsed in 1918 with the end of World War 1, and the state of Poland emerged with its capital at Warsaw.

From 1918 to 1928, Jewish pogroms persisted throughout Poland. The Poles were recently liberated, and utilized their newfound freedom to establish themselves politically. This anti-Semitic behavior peaked when they attacked Ukrainian Jews in Eastern Galacia. They looted Jewish houses throughout Poland and in Jas~~l~~o, and burned Jewish possessions.

Following this era, the Jews of Jas~~l~~o experienced a successful period in which the economy flourished. The President of Poland, Ignancy Moscicki, visited the town at this time as well.

== Synagogue ==
Following the foundation of the original synagogue, architects were brought in to design a new one funded by millions of dollars (the Great Synagogue), set to open during Rash Hashanah 1905–1906. The new synagogue was very large (nearly 20 meters high) and could hold many for worship. It was destroyed by the Nazis in 1939.

== Zionism ==
The strongest Zionist community was Yeshuran, which was created in the 1900s. This was the core of all Jewish thought in the city. A second major organization was Mizrahi.

== Culture and Community ==
From 1870 onward, the community grew rapidly. By the start of World War 2, the community numbered nearly 3,400 people, which made up about 22% of the entire population of Jas~~l~~o. By the start of the war, the Jews had their synagogue, schools, theater hall, and own governing body. There were plays and films shown in the theater in Yiddish with Polish subtitles in order to include both Jewish communities.

The Jewish community was separated into two groups. The first group was predominantly Polish speaking people that were distinctly business and academically oriented. The second group was predominantly Yiddish speaking and less educated than the Polish community. They lived in the poorer section of the city, which was occupied by mainly Jews.
