= Trojanowski =

Trojanowski is a Polish masculine surname, its feminine counterpart is Trojanowska. Its Russian and Ukrainian versions (Russian: Трояновский, Ukrainian: Трояновський) are transliterated as Troyanovsky, Troyanovski, Troyanovskyi, Troianovski (masculine) or Troyanovskaya (feminine). It may refer to:

- Anton Troianovski (born 1985), Soviet-born American journalist
- Daniel Trojanowski (born 1982), Polish rower
- Eduard Troyanovsky (born 1980), Russian boxer
- Izabela Trojanowska (born 1955), Polish singer and film actress
- John Q. Trojanowski (1946–2022), American scientist
- Mieczyslaw Rys-Trojanowski (1881–1945), Polish general
- Oleg Troyanovsky (1919–2003), ambassador of the Soviet Union to Japan and China
- Tadeusz Trojanowski (1933–1997), Polish wrestler
- Wincenty Trojanowski (1859–1928), Polish painter
- Yevhen Troyanovskyi (born 1993), Ukrainian football player
- Zdzisław Trojanowski (1928–2006), Polish ice hockey player
