= Great Synagogue (Jasło) =

Destroyed Orthodox synagogue in Jasło, Poland

- Polish: Wielka Synagoga w Jaśle
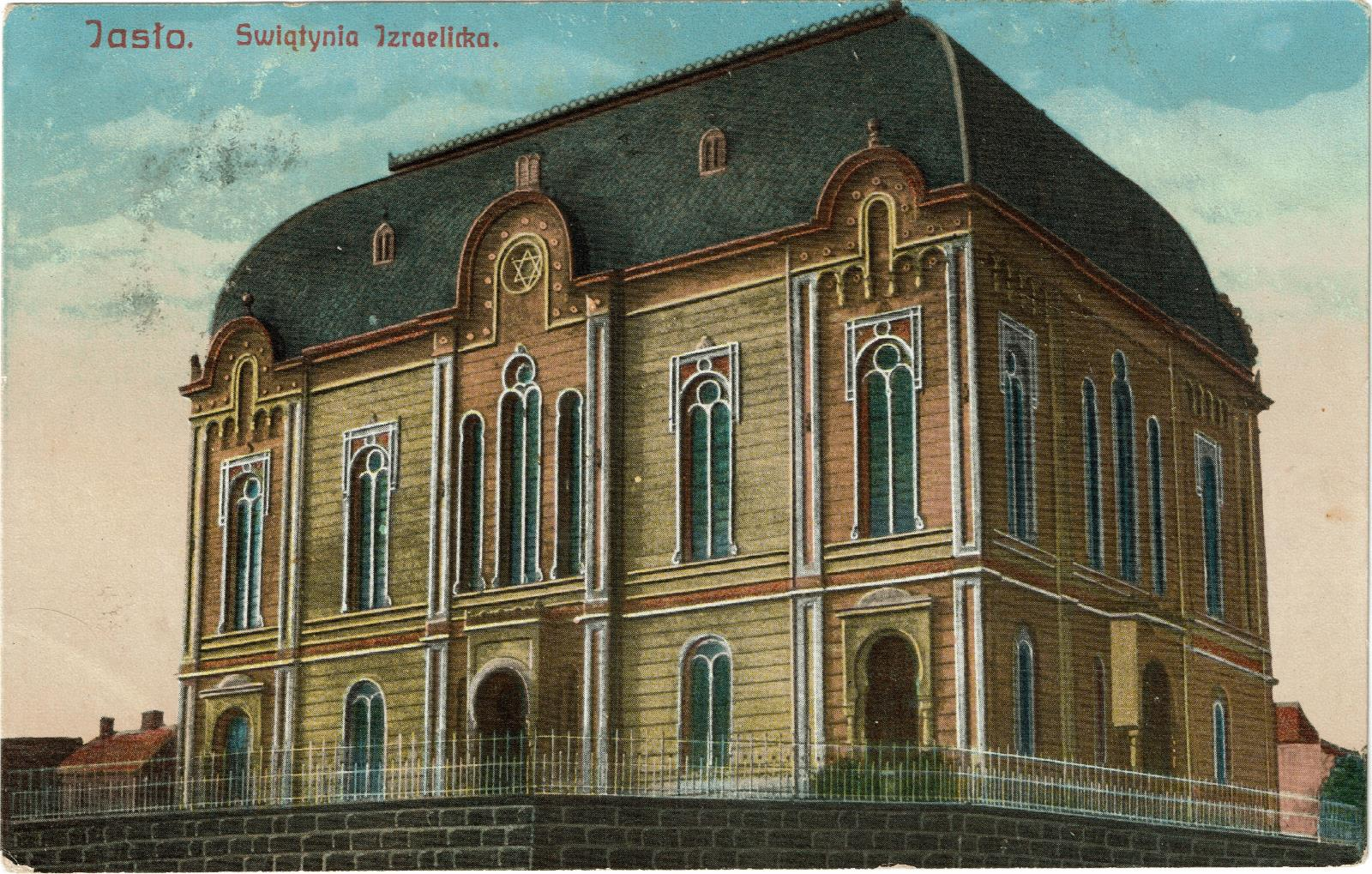
- A postcard of the former synagogue, c. 1911

- Location of the destroyed synagogue in Podkarpackie Voivodeship

Religion
- Affiliation: Orthodox Judaism (former)
- Ecclesiastical or organizational status: Synagogue (1905–1939)
- Status: Destroyed

Location
- Location: Karol Szajnocha Street, Szajnocha Square, Jasło, Podkarpackie Voivodeship
- Country: Poland
- Interactive map of Great Synagogue
- Coordinates: 49°44′55″N 21°28′16″E

Architecture
- Type: Synagogue architecture
- Completed: 1905
- Destroyed: Yom Kippur 1939
- Materials: Brick

The Great Synagogue (Polish: Wielka Synagoga w Jaśle) was a former Orthodox Jewish congregation and synagogue, that was located on Karol Szajnocha Street, in the Szajnocha Square, in Jasło, in the Podkarpackie Voivodeship of Poland. Completed in 1905, the synagogue served as a house of prayer until World War II when it was destroyed by Nazis on Yom Kippur in 1939.

== History ==
After World War II, a restaurant was built on the site.

A replica façade of the former Jasło Synagogue was included in the rebuild of the Forest Hill Jewish Centre, on Spadina Road in Toronto, Canada.

== See also ==
- History of the Jews in Poland
- List of active synagogues in Poland
