= Wincenty Trojanowski =

Polish painter

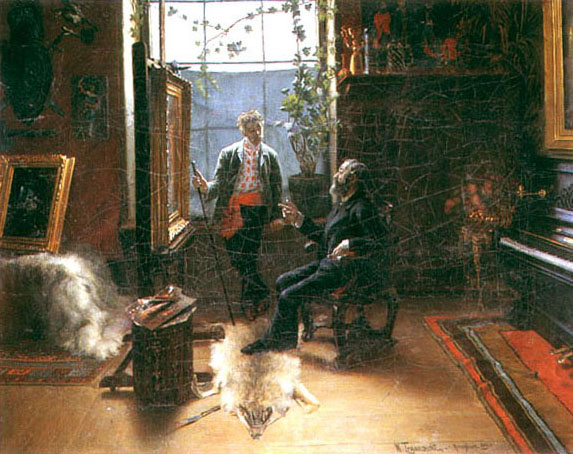
- Critic visits the artist (1889)
- Born: Wincenty Trojanowski; 1859; Warsaw, Poland
- Died: 1928 (aged 68–69); Warsaw, Poland
- Education: Imperial Academy of Arts in St. Peterburg
- Known for: Painting

Wincenty Trojanowski (born 1859 in Warsaw, died 1928 therein) was a Polish painter and sculptor.

Wincenty Trojanowski began his art studies in the year of 1878 to 1880, in Warsaw, where he was taught by Wojciech Gerson and Aleksander Kamiński, he continued his studies at the Imperial Academy of Arts in St. Peterburg; from 1885, he studied for one year at the Academy of Fine Arts in Munich, where he was taught by Alexander von Wagner. In 1890, he left for his art travels to the Near East, after which he came back in 1893, and lived in Paris, where he continued painting. For several years, he regularly submitted works to Salon des Artistes français. In 1900, he received a bronze medal at the Universal Exhibition. In 1904, he moved back to Warsaw, where a year later he founded the Art School of Applied Arts (Szkoła Artystyczną Sztuki Stosowanej).

== Works ==
=== Paintings ===
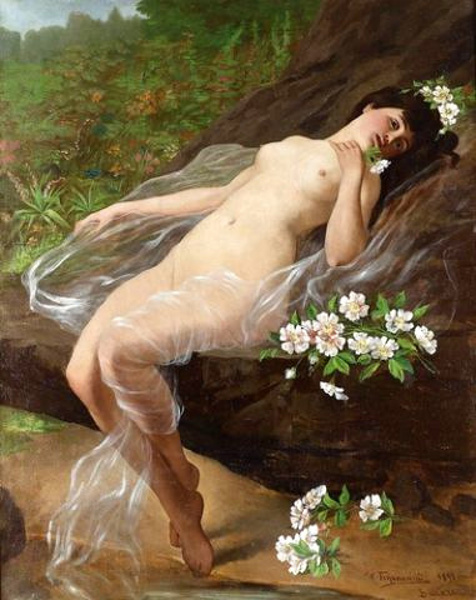
Female nude on a rock
(1898)

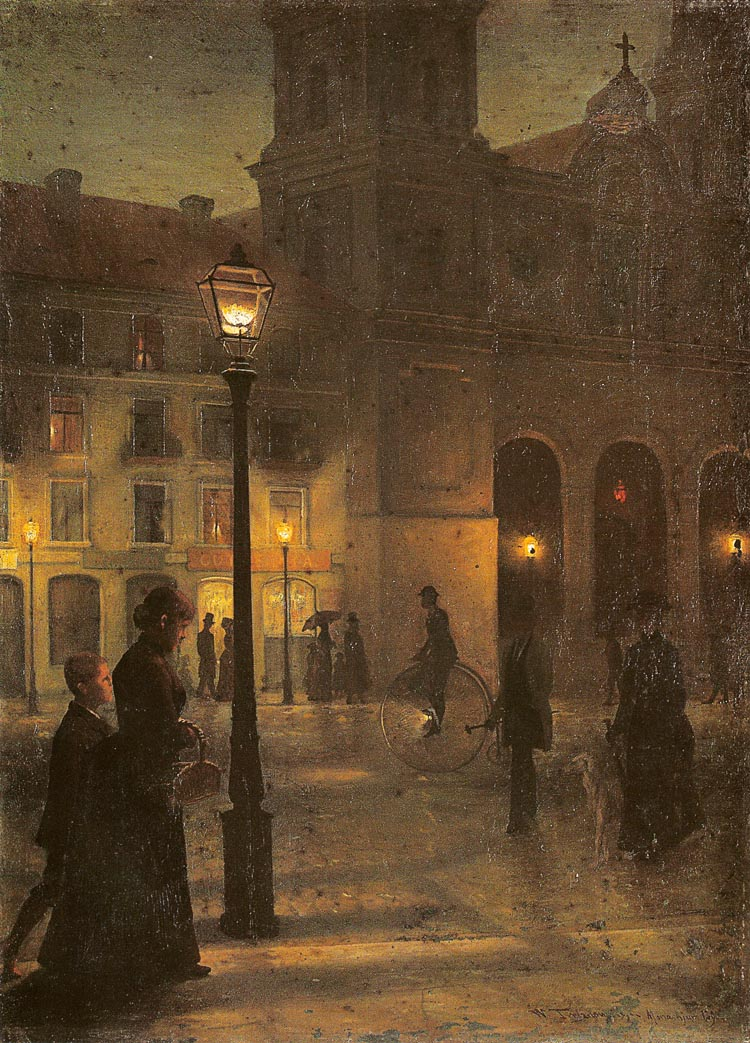
Maximilian's Square in Munich
(1890)

=== Medals ===
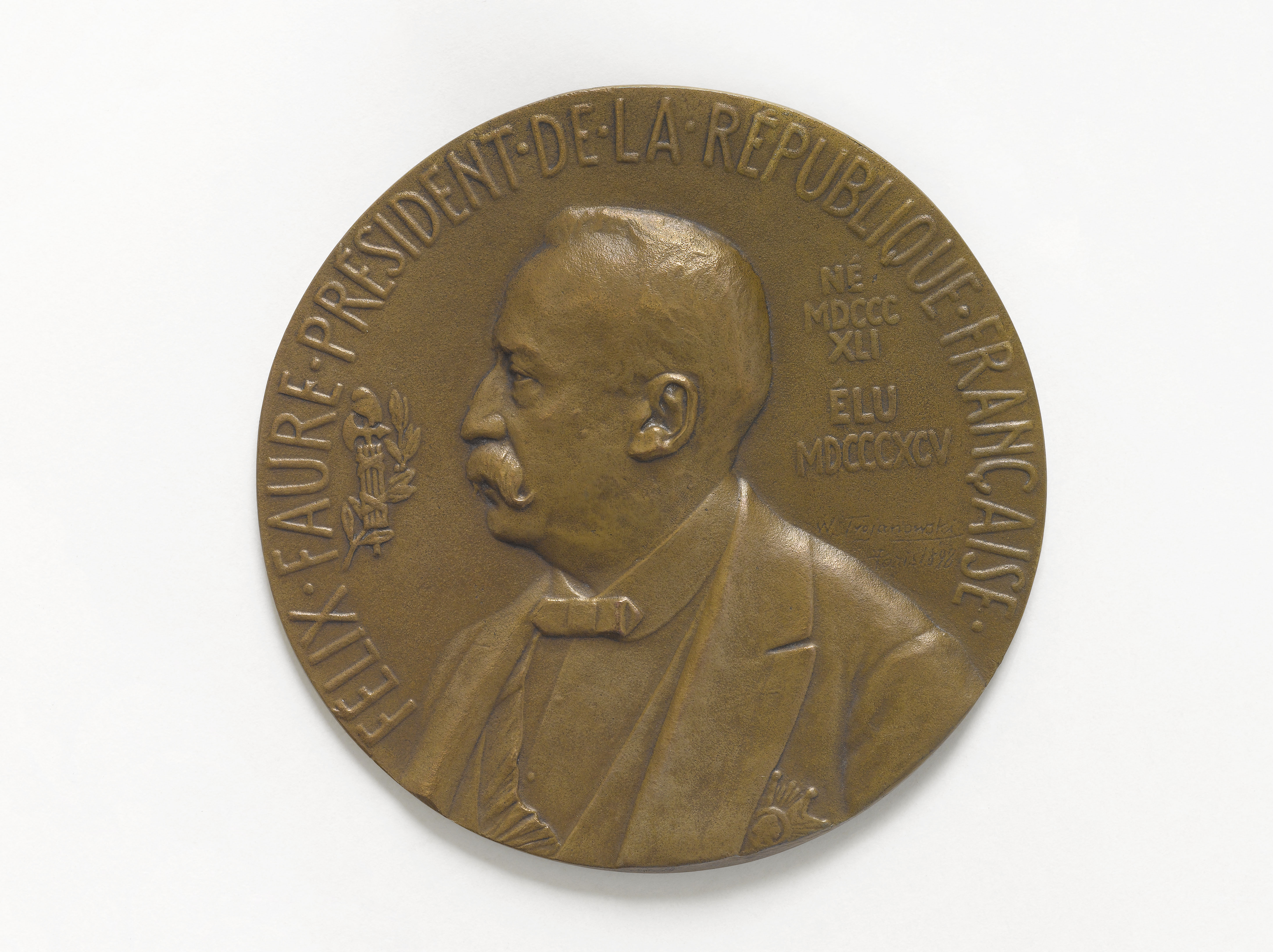
Medal of Félix Faure

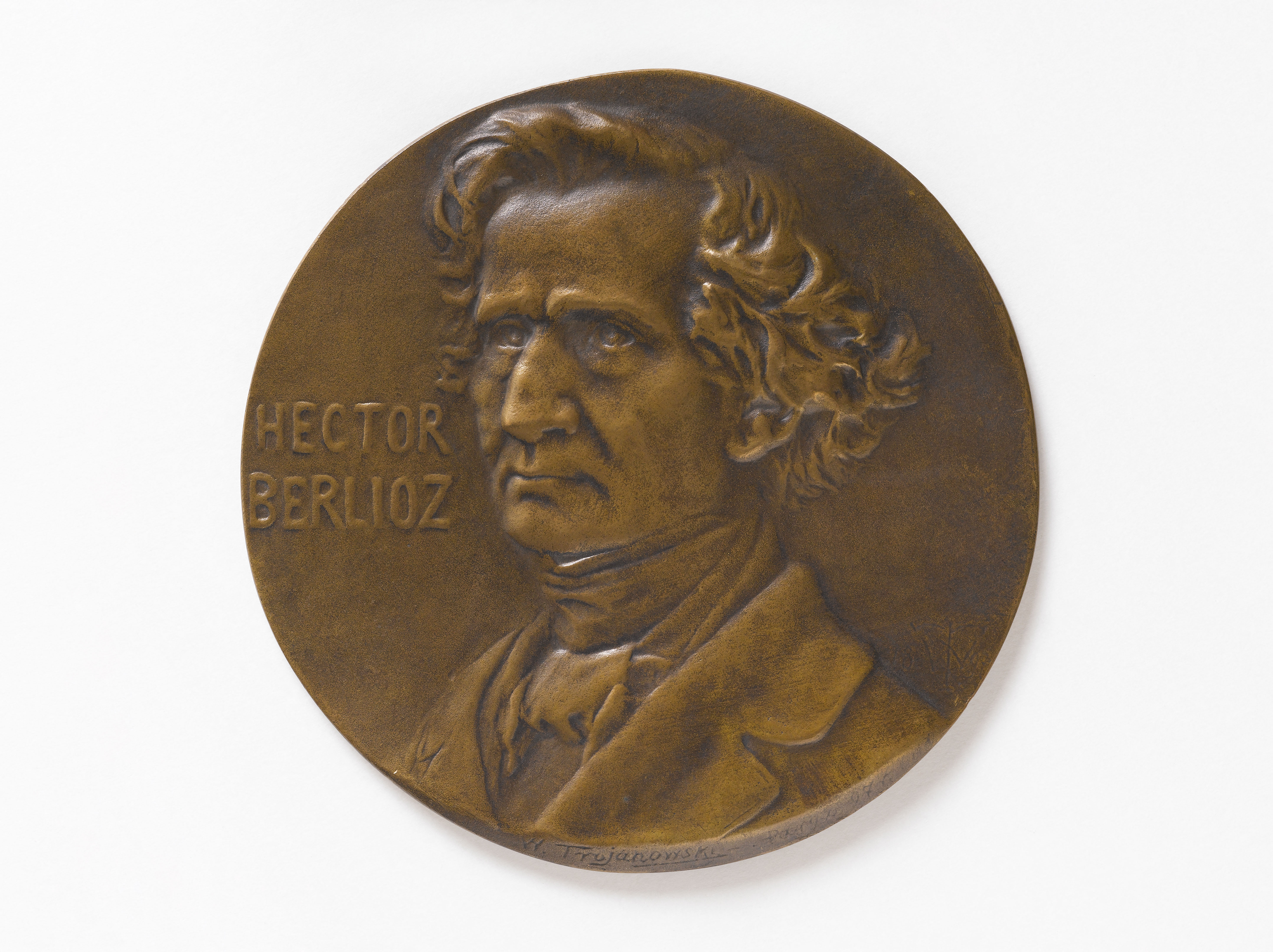
Medal of Hector Berlioz

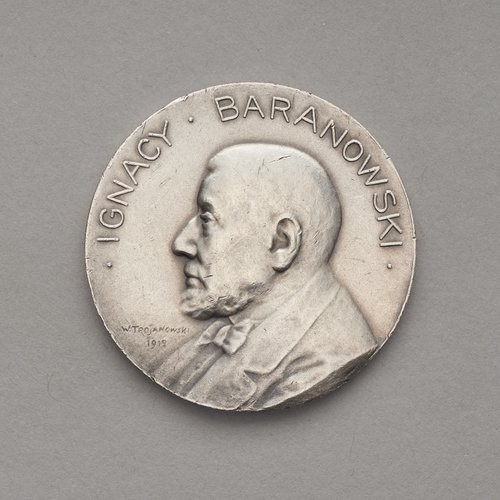
Medal of Ignacy Baranowski

== See also ==
- Orientalism
- List of Orientalist artists
