= Stróże =

Stróże may refer to the following places in Poland:

- Stróże, Kuyavian-Pomeranian Voivodeship (north-central Poland)
- Stróże, Nowy Sącz County in Lesser Poland Voivodeship (south Poland)
- Stróże, Tarnów County in Lesser Poland Voivodeship (south Poland)
