= Cezary Geroń =

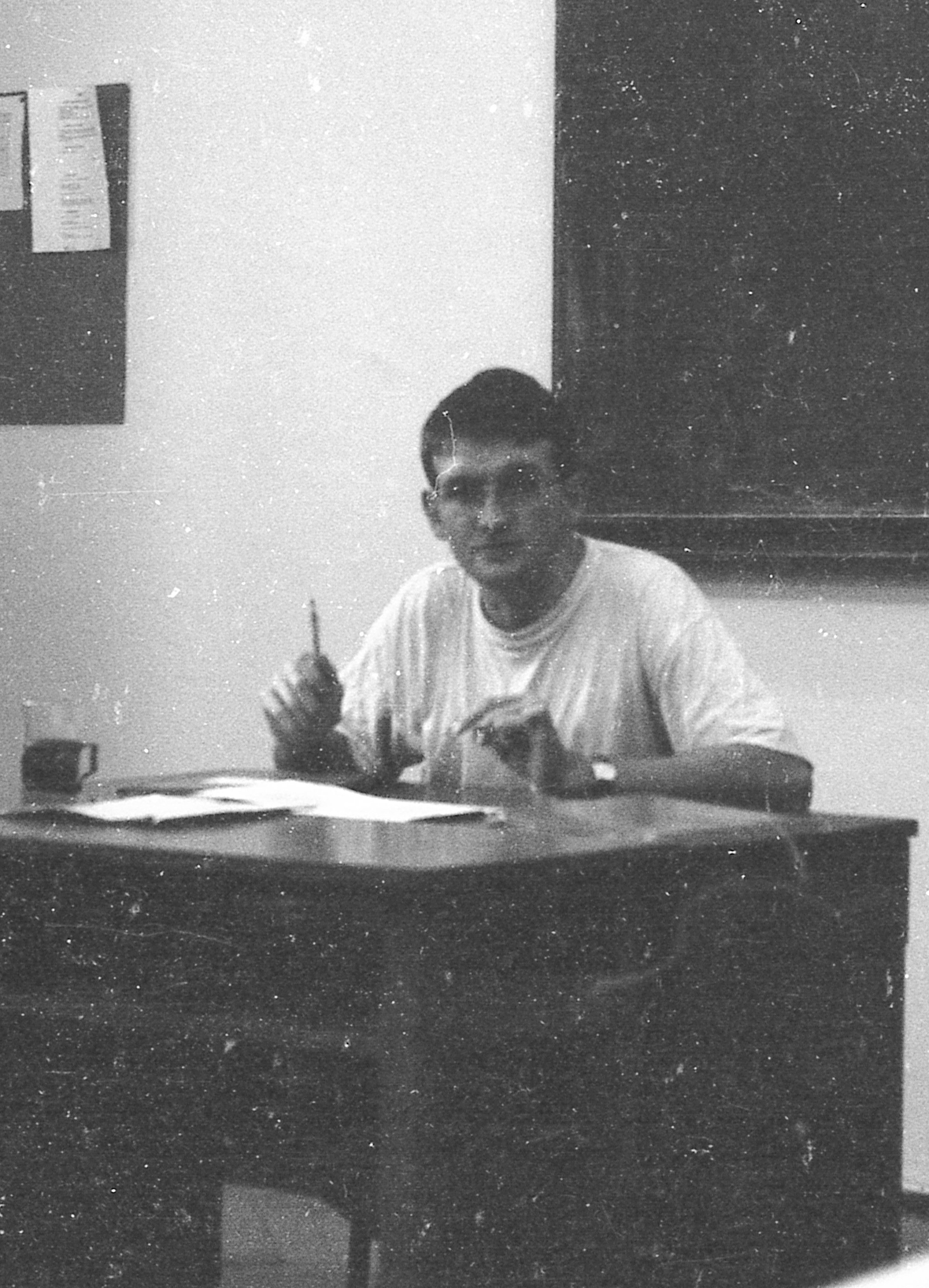
Cezary Geroń in class, 1997

Cezary Geroń (1960–1998) was a Polish poet, journalist, translator and teacher. Born on 28 July 1960 in Jasło, he graduated from a local college in nearby Krosno. Afterwards he moved to Kraków, where he joined the Faculty of French Studies. He then moved to the Warsaw University, from which he graduated. He started working as a journalist and correspondent for the L'Osservatore Romano. At that time he started to translate Italian poetry, notably the works of Eugenio Montale, Alfonso Gatto, Mario Luzi and Umberto Saba. He was also active as a journalist, speaker and translator for the Polish Radio and the Polish Television. In 1991 he started working as a teacher of the history of music, Polish and Italian languages at the Warsaw-based 1st Community College Bednarska. Having been of poor health for all of his life, he died suddenly of a heart disease on 26 April 1998 and was buried in Jasło.

After his death, several dozen manuscripts of his poems were collected from among his friends and published in two collections.

== References and bibliography ==
1. Cezary Geroń (1999). Kalina Gawęcka, Cezary Galewicz (ed.). Lśnienie (in Polish). Kraków: Oficyna Literacka. p. 124. ISBN 83-7124-108-9.
2. Cezary Geroń (1999). Ewa Mańkowska; et al. (eds.). Życie jest śmieszne (in Polish). Krosno: Museum of Crafts. p. 44. ISBN 83-905920-9-6.
