= Ignacy Szymański =

- Born: February 1806
- Died: September 14 1874 (aged 67–68); Summer Hill Farm
- Military career
- Allegiance: November Insurgents; Confederate States of America
- Branch: Confederate States Army
- Service years: 1830–1831, 1861–1865
- Rank: Colonel
- Nickname: Colonel Ski or Old Ski
- Commands: Chalmette Regiment

Ignatius Constantine Romuald Szymanski Vandernoot or Ignacy Szymański or Ignatius Szymanski (1806–1874), nicknamed Colonel Ski or Old Ski, was a Polish war hero and American soldier. He served in the Confederate States Army during the American Civil War.

== Biography ==
He was the son of Simon Szymanski and Francisca Vandernoot. His father had fought in the Kościuszko Uprising (1794), so he came from a long list of Polish freedom fighters.

As a Polish general, he fought in the Ulan Division along with Prince Adam Woronecki in the November Uprising (1830–1831 uprising) against the Russian Empire. After the Polish army was defeated, some of the soldiers went to France looking for Napoleon´s help. Later, some of them were remembered as France's war heroes, such as the Prince Józef Poniatowski.

Not convinced about Napoleon's support to recover Poland, not for the French aid [?] helping some of his soldiers who were still looking for evacuation in the Austro-Hungarian Empire, hidden from the Russians, he went to England and later to the United States, seeking help. He was very active helping soldiers and other Polish immigrants in the U.S., as was described by Victor Labeski, one of his officers who arrived in New York on the ship Adria in 1835, from the Austro-Hungarian Empire.

In 1835, Szymański moved to New Orleans, where he married Charlotte Hortense Lacoste. He became a well-known man, evidenced by his being mentioned many times in the New Orleans newspapers between 1835 and 1875. His friends in the South were other Poles who had been living in the area, notably Gaspar Tochman, Valery Sulakowski, and Hypolite Oladowski.

== Civil War ==
When the Civil War began, Szymański was recruited as a colonel for the Chalmette Regiment, formed mainly by Scandinavian immigrants from the Louisiana State Militia. Later, he served as the agent for the exchange of prisoners in the Trans-Mississippi Department.

After the war he came back to his plantation, Summer Hill Farm, and his cotton and sugar cane field called Sebastopol. He accumulated goods and real estate sufficient to be considered a rich man. He even owned racing horses and a yacht.

== Family ==
He had no descendants with Charlotte Hortense Lacoste, who was already aged 50 at the time of their marriage. Previously, Col. Szymanski had a long plaçage relationship with Mrs. Eliza Romain, a free woman of color. They had three children: Jean Guillaume (1846), Constance Françoise (1847) and Ignace François (1850). Constance was later known as Mrs. Constance Cavelier after her marriage to the French immigrant, Mr. Jules Bernard Cavelier.

In the meantime, Jean worked for his father in the Sebastopol Plantation until his early 20s. In his late 20s, he moved to Mexico and finally settled down at the port of Tampico (Eureka community) along with his uncle, Aristide Romain. Jean was also known as "John" in Louisiana and later as "Juan" in Tampico where, along with his uncle, he worked as a tailor for the wide foreign community which had settled in Tampico due to the oil boom. Jean married Mrs. Carmen Castelló Caimares, cousin of Carmen Romero Rubio Castelló, wife of the Mexican President Porfirio Díaz. Because of the untimely death of his youngest brother, Ignace François, aged one year old, Jean decided to extend the Ignatius line, so his first son was named Ignacio Francisco (1877–1933). After him came Juan Melquiades, Julio Fructuoso (father of Mons. Arturo Szymanski, Bishop of Tampico and Honorary Archbishop of San Luis Potosí), Jose Amado and Jose Ramon Blas. Jean and Carmen also had twins but they did not survive. Jose Amado drowned at the age of 19 during Regatta festival. Jean's grandson, the son of Ignacio Francisco, Ignacio Sabás Szymanski Rodríguez (1905–1998) lived in San Antonio, Texas, until he was 21. After graduation from the La Salle Brothers College as a book keeper, he returned to Mexico to work for the Sinclair Oil Corporation and, after World War II, he worked for Mexicana de Aviación as supplies director as well as president of the Airlines Association of the Americas until his retirement. Today, the Ignatius name continues with Ignacio Francisco Szymanski Morales (1935), Ignacio Alejandro Szymanski Chávez (1961) and Ignacio Francisco Szymanski Garbuno (2000).

Today, a drama about the Szymanski family is still performed at the Sebastopol Residence in Chalmette, Louisiana. The main roles are played by local actors, who play the parts of Ignatius S. Szymanski and his son Jean.
