= Viola Sachs =

Polish academic (1929–2020)

Viola Sachs (20 September 1929 – 26 June 2020) was a Polish professor of American Literature at "Warsaw University" and "Université de Paris VIII, France".

== Works ==
As a specialist of Herman Melville, she conducted research and studies for the decoding of Melville's master works. She created the Laboratory of Research on American "Imaginaire" (SIAM) in the early eighties at the University of Paris VIII (Département Anglo-Américain). Today, SIAM's research programs are continuing with the "Résonance Group" of the University of Paris VIII.

Her teachings brought also a new approach on:

- the influences of the Bible in American Literature,
- the important role of fraternities and sororities in most of American master works.

Viola Sachs was also a specialist of Brazil, where she lived and studied after World War II. Ignacy Sachs, her husband published an autobiographical essay in which he narrates their trip from Poland to Brazil and India during the doom years of Nazism in Europe:

- Sachs, Ignacy (2008). La troisième rive. Paris: Éditions Bourin. ISBN 978-2-84941-072-1.

== Bibliography ==
=== American Literature Studies ===
- Sachs, Viola (1987). The Game of Creation: The Primeval Unlettered Language of Moby Dick, Or, The Whale. Paris: Éditions de la Maison des sciences de l'homme. ISBN 2-901725-35-X.
- Sachs, Viola (1975). La Contre-Bible de Melville: 'Moby-Dick' déchiffré. London: Maney Publishing. ISBN 978-2-7193-0441-9.
- Sachs, Viola (1985). Le Blanc et le Noir chez Melville et Faulkner. The Hague: Walter De Gruyter Inc. ISBN 90-279-7961-8.
- Sachs Viola, Derail Agnès (1985). L'imaginaire-Melville: a French point of view. Paris: Presses Universitaires de Vincennes. ISBN 978-2-903981-78-5.
- Sachs, Viola (1973). The Myths of America. The Hague: Mouton.
- Sachs, Viola (1971). Le Sacre et le Profane: The Bear de William Faulkner. Paris: Département Anglo-Americain Université de Paris VIII.

=== Brazilian works ===
Her Brazilian publications include:

- Sachs, Viola et Céline (1990). São Paulo. Paris: Le Comptoir des presses Universitaires. ISBN 2-7351-0385-4.
- Sachs, Viola (1987). Development and Planning. Paris: Éditions de la Maison des sciences de l'homme. ISBN 978-2-7351-0191-7.

== See also ==
- Paris 8 University
- Herman Melville
- Ignacy Sachs
