= Ignacy Sachs =

Economist (1927–2023)

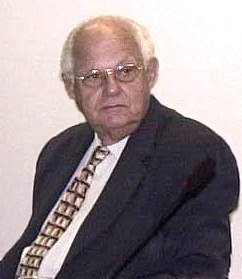
Sachs in 2004

Ignacy Sachs (17 December 1927 – 2 August 2023) was a Polish-French-Brazilian economist. He was considered to be an ecosocioeconomist for his ideas about development as a combination of economic growth, equalitarian increase in social well-being and environmental preservation.

== Life and career ==
Ignacy Sachs was born on 17 December 1927.

Sachs taught at Paris XII University. He was an invited researcher in the Institut of Advanced Studies in University of São Paulo, and lived in Brazil between 1941 and 1953 as a war refugee. He was one of the few Jews who returned to Poland (before his move to France) after World War II, which he did due to his communist convictions.

== Death ==
Ignacy Sachs died on 2 August 2023, at the age of 95.

== Biography ==
=== Works published in Brazil and about Brazil ===
- Capitalismo de Estado e Subdesenvolvimento: Padrões de setor público em economias subdesenvolvidas. Petrópolis : Vozes. 1969.
- Ecodesenvolvimento : crescer sem destruir. Trans. E. Araujo. - São Paulo: Vértice, 1981.
- Espaços, tempos e estratégias do desenvolvimento. São Paulo: Vértice. 1986.
- Histoire. culture et styles de développement : Brésil et Inde -esquisse de comparaison under the assessment of C. Comeliau and I. Sachs. L'Harmattan, UNESCO/CENTRAL, Paris.
- Extractivismo na Amazônia brasileira: perspectivas sobre o desenvolvimento regional. Ed. M. Cllisener-Godt and Ignacy Sachs. -Paris: UNESCO, 1994; -96 pp. (Compêndio MAB; 18)
- Estratégias de transição para o século XXI: desenvolvimento e meio ambiente. Prologue: M. F. Strong; trans. Magda Lopes. São Paulo: Studio Nobel : Fundação do desenvolvimento administrativo (FUNDAP), 1993.
- Brazilian Perspectives on Sustainable Development of the Amazon Region. Ed. M. Clüsener-Godt and I. Sachs. UNESCO/The Parthenon Publishing Group, Paris-New York, 1995.
- Rumo à Ecossocioeconomia - teoria e prática do desenvolvimento. São Paulo: Cortez Editora, 2007.

== Works about Ignacy Sachs ==
- Desenvolvimento e Meio Ambiente no Brasil - A contribuição de Ignacy Sachs. Organizacão de Paulo Freire Vieira. Mauricio Andres Ribeiro. Roberto Messias Franco, Renato Caporali Cordeiro. Editora Palotti/APED. Florianópolis. 1998.
- Pour aborder le XXIème siècle avec le développement durable, textes édités par Solange Passaris et Krystyna Vinaver. Economies et Sociétés - Cahiers de l'ISMEA, tome xxxn. n° 1/1998. Serie "Développement, croissance et progrès", Presses Universitaires de Grenoble, Grenoble.

=== Autobiography ===
- La troisième rive. Editions Bourin : Paris. 2008.
  Published in Brazil as A Terceira Margem by Companhia Das Letras in 2009.

This book is an autobiography of Ignacy Sachs and Viola Sachs. Its title is inspired on a short story written by Guimarães Rosa.

== See also ==
- Karl William Kapp
- Viola Sachs
