= Strzemie coat of arms =

Polish coat of arms

Strzemię
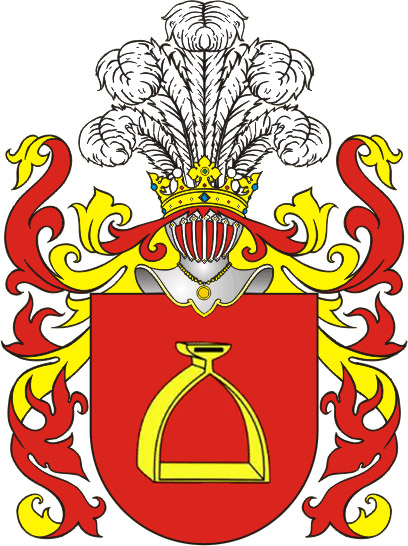
- Battle cry: Larysza, Łapszowa, Ławszowa
- Alternative names: Ławszowa, Larysza, Łapszowa, Strepa, Strzymień, Strzemieczny; Zarosze
- Earliest mention: 1303
- Towns: none
- Families: 148 names altogether: Batorski, Bodzęta, Bojanecki, Bożydarowicz, Brona, Brun, Brzostowski, Buchcicki, Buczyński, Bułatowski, Burzyński, Buszczyński, Chlewiecki, Chwalibóg, Cląp, Cyrski, Czerzawski, Czerzowski, Delencz, Dzięgiel, Falkowski, Garlicki, Gezowski, Giendwiło, Gołkowski, Jaciusus, Janiszewski, Janiszowski, Janowski, Jeszowski, Jeżowski, Jugowski, Jurczyński, Kapusta, Karbiński, Kawalec, Kawalecz, Kawiecki, Kijański, Kilanowski, Klamp, Klampowicz, Kląb, Klączyński, Kląp, Kleczeński, Kleczyński, Klempa, Klempowski, Klempski, Klępa, Koczanowski, Koczynowski, Konwa, Korz, Korzeński, Korzon, Kregel, Krobicki, Krolewski, Krop, Krotosz, Królewski, Królowski, Kuczmorka, Kulewski, Kurowski, Laeta, Lanczewski, Lanczowski, Lenczewski, Lenczowski, Leńczowski, Lewniowski, Linczewski, Lisowiecki, Longin, Łapszewski, Ławszowski, Łobarzewski, Łysowiecki, Madaliński, Marszycki, Marszyński, Marzeniec, Narbut, Narbutt, Nowokuński, Okrasimski, Okrasiński, Pierzchała, Połaniecki, Przybkowski, Przytkowski, Przytykowski, Rogoz, Rogoza, Rohoza, Saliewski, Sanocki, Sroczyński, Straszowski, Strepa, Strojnowski, Stroynowski, Stryga, Strzemieczny, Strzemień, Strzemię, Strzemiński, Sułowski, Surowski, Szalewski, Świaborowski, Świeborowski, Świebowski, Taszycki, Trzecieski, Trzeciak, Tysiecki, Tyszecki, Wałkowski, Wibułtowicz, Wielopolski, Wilbutowicz, Wiłbułtowicz, Wiłbutowicz, Wojnarowski, Wojnecki, Wojnicki, Woynarowski, Wróblowski, Wrzosowski, Wsieborowski, Wsołowski, Wszeborowski, Wszeborski, Wszemborowski, Wszęborowski, Wścieklica, Wysocki, Zagorowski, Zagórowski, Zasowski, Zassowski, Zbiltowski, Zbylitowski, Zdulski, Zgłobicki

Strzemię (Polish for "Stirrup") is a Polish coat of arms. It was used by several szlachta families under the Polish–Lithuanian Commonwealth.

== Blazon ==
Gules, a stirrup Or.

== Notable bearers ==
Notable bearers of this Coat of Arms have included:

- Antoni Józef Madaliński (1739–1804) – Polish general

== See also ==
- Polish heraldry
- Heraldry
- Coat of Arms
