= Janusz Kołodziej (politician) =

Polish politician

member of Sejm 2005-2007
- In office 25 September 2005 – ?

Personal details
- Born: 18 May 1959 (age 66)
- Party: League of Polish Families

Janusz Adam Kołodziej (born 18 May 1959 in Jasło) is a Polish politician. He was elected to the Sejm on 25 September 2005, getting 3786 votes in 22 Krosno district as a candidate from the League of Polish Families list.

== See also ==
- Members of Polish Sejm 2005-2007
