= Ignacy Kruszewski =

Polish general

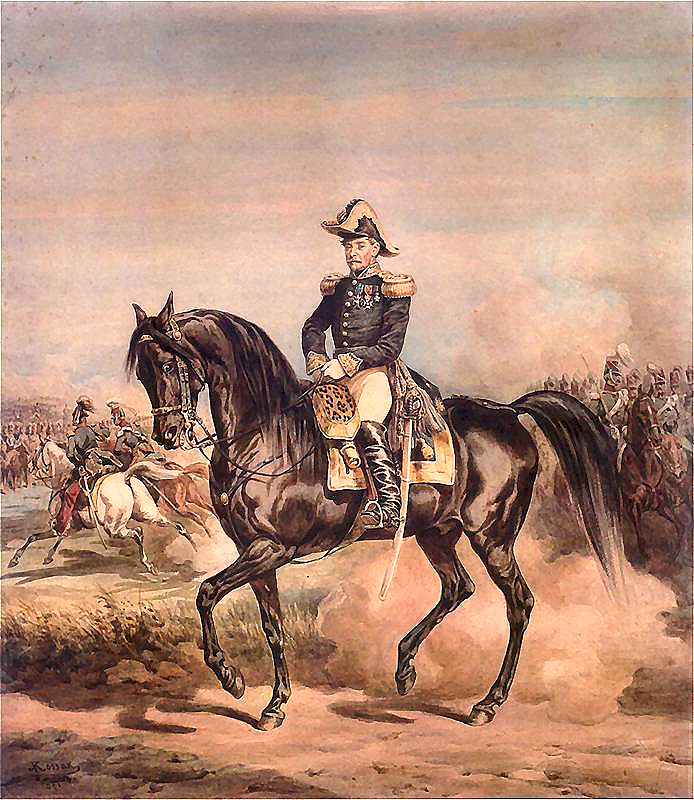
Ignacy Kruszewski

Ignacy Marceli Kruszewski (Lusławice, 6 January 1799 - 25 December 1879, Gogołów, near Jasło) was a Polish military leader.

== Life ==
Kruszewski participated as a colonel in the November 1830 Uprising as aide-de-camp to General Józef Grzegorz Chłopicki and General Jan Zygmunt Skrzynecki.

After the uprising, he lived in exile and became a general in the Belgian Army.

In 1848 he was expected to lead the Polish insurgent army in Greater Poland.

From 1852 he lived in Galicia.

During the January 1863 Uprising, he headed the Polish Army department in Kraków.

== Works ==
- Pamiętniki (Memoirs, 1890)
