= Piotr Ignacy Bieńkowski =

Polish archaeologist (1865–1925)

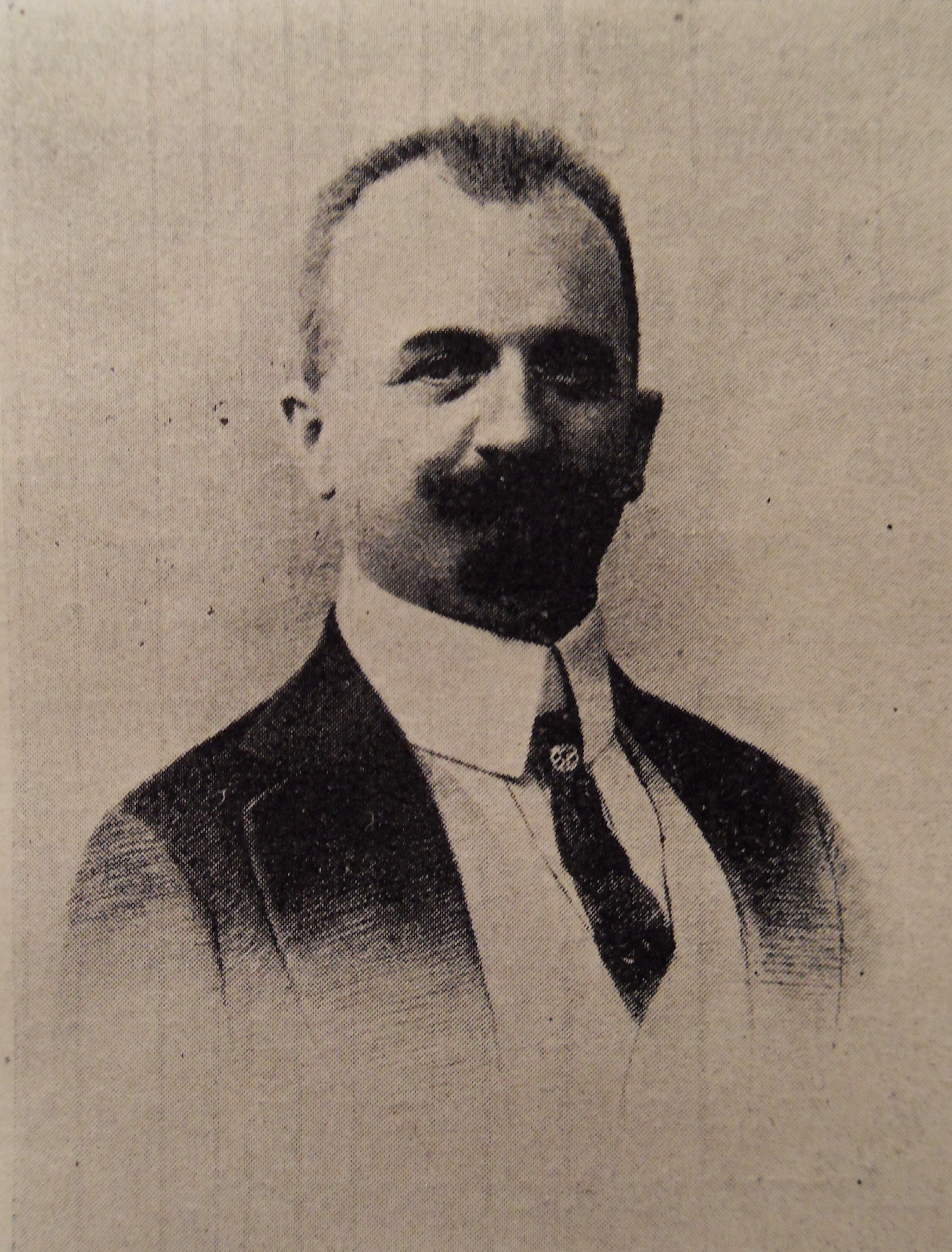
Piotr Ignacy Bieńkowski.

Piotr Ignacy Bieńkowski (1865–1925) was a Polish classical scholar and archaeologist, professor of Jagiellonian University. Bieńkowski studied classical philology and history at the University of Lwów and University of Berlin (under Theodor Mommsen). He continued his studies in Vienna, Rome and Athens, habilitation at the University of Kraków.

Piotr created at Kraków the first chair of classical archaeology at a Polish university. In the season of 1910-1911 as a representative of the Kraków Academy, he took part in Austrian excavations conducted by Junker in el-Kubania heading the fieldwork at the Coptic monastery at a site called Mount of Isis.

Piotr published over 80 scientific papers, including Historya kształtów biustu starożytnego ("The history of ancient bust shapes") and O skarbie srebrnym z Choniakowa na Wołyniu ("About the silver treasure from Choniaków in Volhynia").
