= Chalmette Regiment =

- Active: 1861–1863
- Disbanded: September 1863
- Country: Confederate States
- Allegiance: Louisiana
- Branch: Louisiana Militia
- Type: Infantry
- Size: Regiment
- Engagements: American Civil War

Commanders
- Commanding officers: Col. Ignatius Szymanski; Lieut. Col. George W.Logan; Maj. Eugene Soniat

The Chalmette Regiment was a regiment of the Louisiana Militia consisting of foreign volunteers called into Confederate service in the American Civil War for 90 days March 1, 1862. Mustered out in May 1862, the regiment was again called into service in May 1863 to defend Fort Beauregard.

Its Company A "Scandinavian Guards", was the only all-Scandinavian unit in the Confederate Army, consisting of Norwegians, Danes and Swedes.

== History ==
=== Forts Jackson and St. Philip ===
On 18 April the Union Navy began a six-day bombardment of Forts Saint Philip and Jackson. On April 24, the Union fleet landed some 18000 men near Fort Saint Phillip after passing the forts. As a result, the Louisiana State Militia regiments were disbanded by Gen. E.L.Tracy. The entire Chalmette Regiment was captured and paroled at Quarantine Station on 24 April 1862 by Farragut's vessels, except company D.

Company D of the Chalmette regiment, had been detached serving as artillerymen manning the floating battery "Louisiana" under Captain M.T.Squires and suffered one killed and two wounded during the battle of Fort Saint Phillip on April 26.

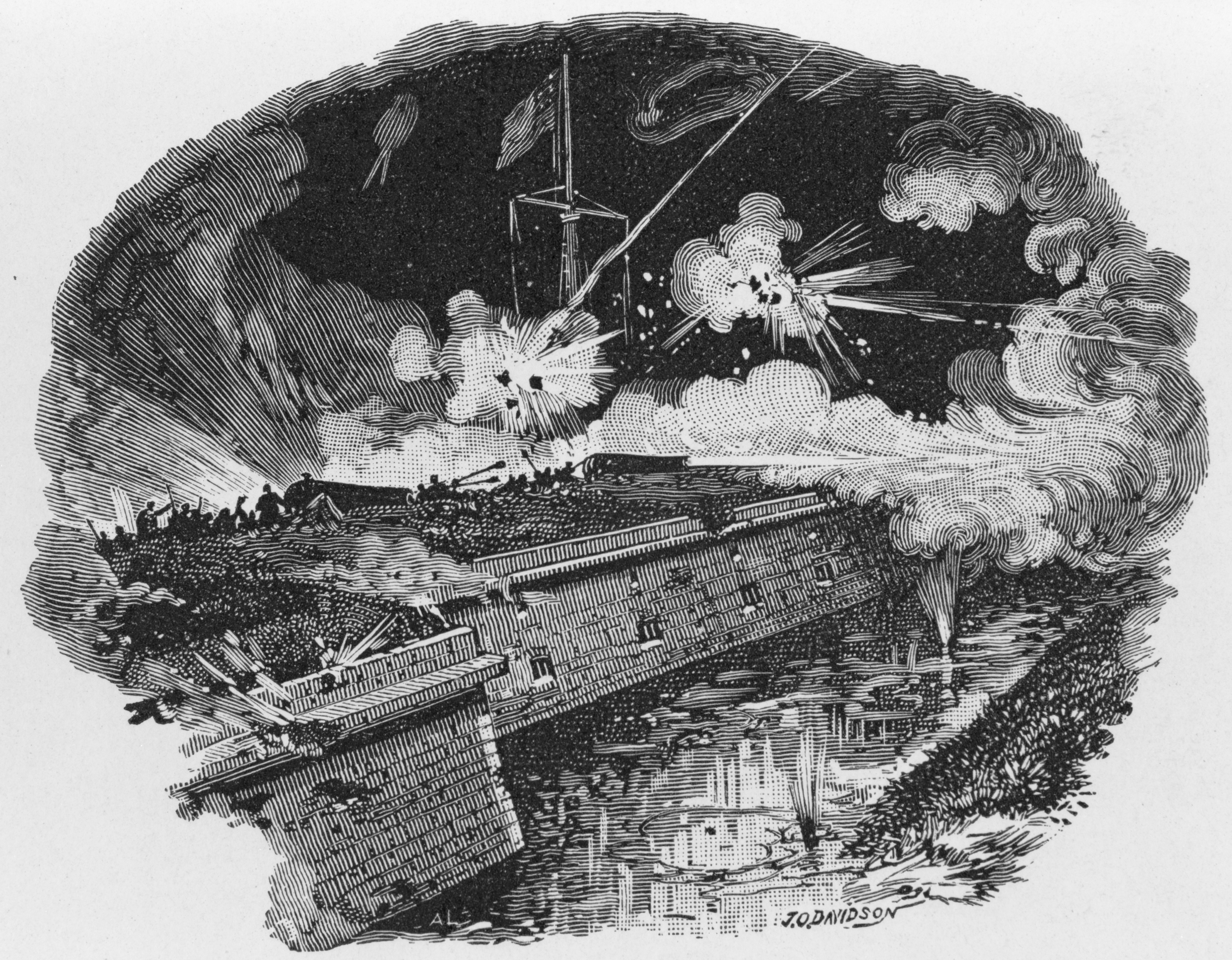
The Bombardment of Fort Saint Philip

Lieutenant George H. Perkins of the USS Cayuga described the scene : "..The Cayuga still led the way up the river and at daylight we discovered a regiment of infantry encamped on shore. As we were very close in, I shouted to them to come on board and deliver up their arms, or we would blow them all to pieces. It seemed rather odd for a regiment on shore to be surrendering to a ship! They hauled down their colors, and the Colonel and command came on board and gave themselves up as prisoners of war. The regiment was called the Chalmette Regiment, and has been quite a famous one. The officers were released on parole and allowed to retain their sidearms, all except one Captain, who I discovered was from New Hampshire."

Colonel Szymanski made a statement on April 18, 1863, at the military court of inquiry assembled in Jackson, Mississippi, to investigate the fall of New Orleans, about the surrender of his regiment; "When the forts were passed, just about break of day, the fleet came upon my small camp and opened fire. After losing some 30 men killed and wounded, without a possibility of escape or rescue- perfectly at the mercy of the enemy, he being able to cut the levee and drown me out- I thought it my duty to surrender. A single shell could have cut the light embankment."

Many of the officers and enlisted men of the other units escaped the city before it surrendered and accompanied Lovell's regular Confederate units to Camp Moore. When General Benjamin Butler arrived in New Orleans, the officers and men taken as prisoners of war, paroled, and those who did not take the oath to the United States, were exchanged on the 8th of October, and then being delivered to Confederate officials at Vicksburg. While the majority took the oath, a number of the men who were paroled and exchanged, re-enlisted in Louisiana units on active duty in the Vicksburg area.

=== Fort Beauregard ===
In May 1863, the regiment was called back into service to defend Fort Beauregard. Four Federal gunboats commanded by Commodore Selim E. Woodworth arrived on May 10, 1863, and after a demand for its surrender was refused, three of the gunboats opened fire, killing one officer and damaging the parapet.

A company of forty men from the Chalmette regiment defended Fort Beauregard with four artillery pieces until September 4, 1863, when the regiment's commander, Lt.Col. George W.Logan, ordered it to be abandoned. Logan personally supervised the destruction of the breastworks, casements, and commissary stores by fires and explosions before withdrawing his men.

== Regimental order of battle ==
Units of Chalmette Regiment included:

Company Name	Commander	Peak Strength	Notes
Company A' Scandinavian Guards	Capt. Edward Fry	73 men	
Company B' Manassas Rifles	Capt. G. Andrews		
Company C' Plauche Rebels	Capt. Chaery		
Company D' Howard Guards	Capt. Massicot		
Company E' Gulf Guards	Capt. Wiltz		
Company F' Heation Guards	Capt. William Chapman		
Company G' Gentilly Rangers	Capt. Valeton		
Company H' Frappe d’Abord	Capt. T. Wiltz		
Company I' De Feriet Guards	Capt. Frederick Losberg		
Company K' Clouet Guards	Capt. Jaquet		

== See also ==
- List of Louisiana Confederate Civil War units

== Sources ==
- U.S. War Department, The War of the Rebellion: a Compilation of the Official Records of the Union and Confederate Armies, U.S. Government Printing Office, 1880–1901.
- Stewart Sifakis. Compendium of the Confederate Armies: Louisiana. Facts on File, NY 1992 ISBN 0-8160-2291-7
- Arthur W. Bergeron jr. Guide to Louisiana Confederate Military Units, 1861–1865
- Lonn, Ella. Foreigners in the Confederacy. UNC Press. pp. 147–8. ISBN 0-8078-5400-X
- Napier Bartlett. Military Record of Louisiana
- Letter dated New Orleans, April 27, 1862, by Lieutenant George H. Perkins of the USS Cayuga.
- Almuevennen, (Newspaper Christiania (Oslo), Norway) no. 45, 8 November 1862
