= Ignacy Tadeusz Baranowski =

Polish historian

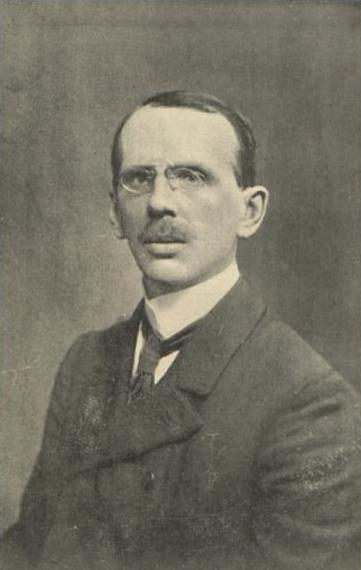
Ignacy Tadeusz Baranowski in 1937

Ignacy Tadeusz Baranowski (born 4 February 1879 in Lublin - 26 November 1917 in Warsaw) was a Polish historian.

He specialized in the history of Warsaw and history of the Polish peasants.

== Publications ==
- Komisje porządkowe w latach 1765-1788 (1907)
- Z dziejów feudalizmu na Podlasiu (1907)
