= Stróże, Nowy Sącz County =

Stróże
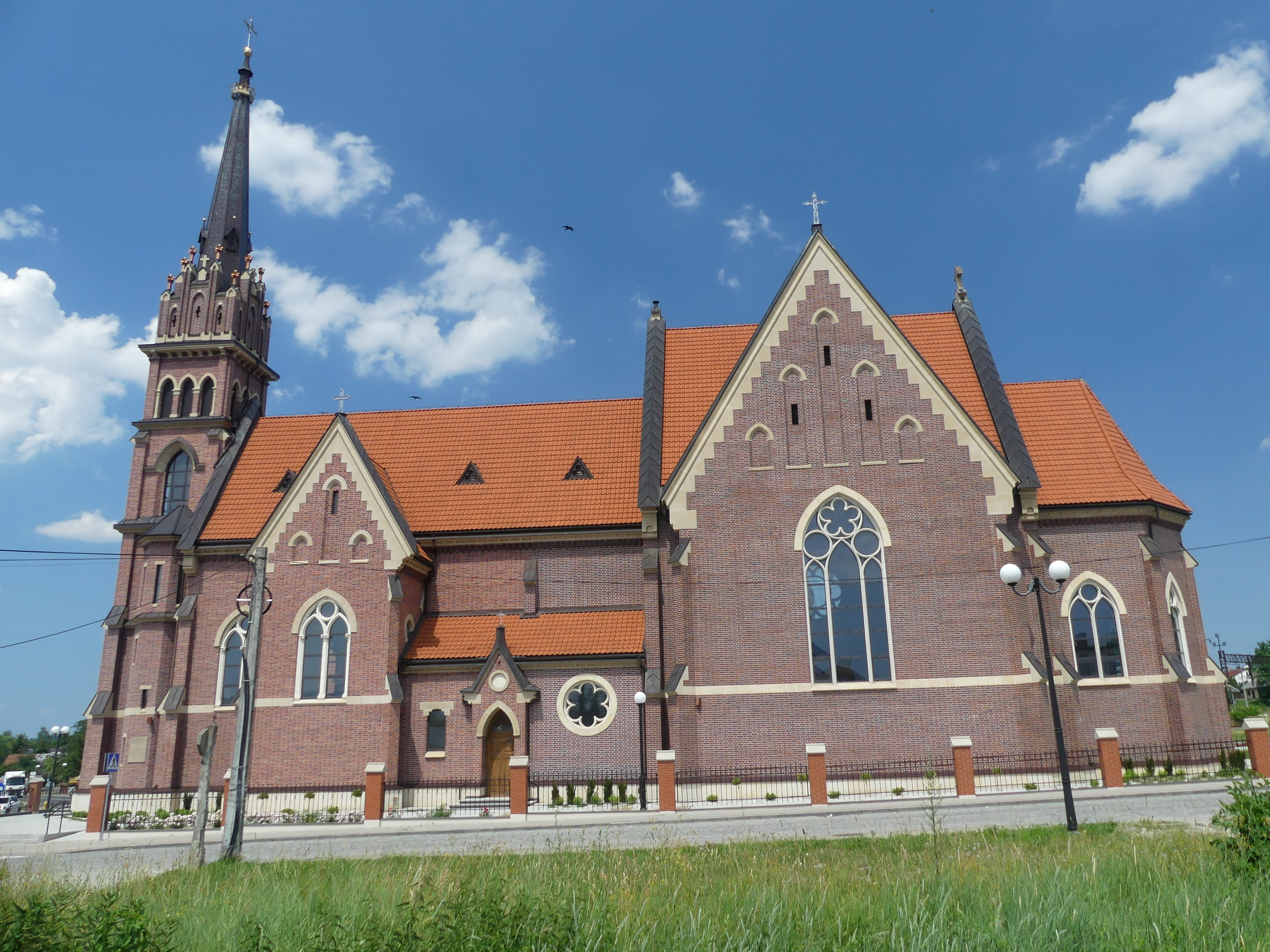
- Church of the Holy Virgin Mary the Queen of Poland

- Location within Poland
- Coordinates: 49°38′24″N 20°58′48″E
- Country: Poland
- Voivodeship: Lesser Poland
- County: Nowy Sącz
- Gmina: Grybów

Area
  - Total: 14.0 km^{2} (5.4 sq mi)

Population (2006)
  - Total: 3,500
  - Density: 250/km^{2} (650/sq mi)
- Time zone: UTC+1 (CET)
  - Summer (DST): UTC+2 (CEST)
- Postal code: 33-331
- Area code: +48 18
- Car plates: KNS

Stróże [ˈstruʐɛ] is a village, located in southern Poland, in the Nowy Sącz County of the Lesser Poland Voivodeship. Situated some 4 kilometres north of Grybów, Stróże is an important railroad junction, with lines going into three directions - northwards to Tarnów, westwards to Nowy Sącz and eastwards to Gorlice.

The village has a Museum of Apiculture. The domestic football team is Kolejarz Stróże.
