= Carroll (given name) =

Carroll is an Irish unisex given name and a surname (Carroll). As an English given name, it is a form of Charles and Caroline. Notable people known by this name include the following:

== Given name ==
- Carroll Edward Adams (1923–1970), American brigadier general
- Carroll Alley (1927–2016), American physicist
- Carroll Arnett, baptismal name of Gogisgi, Cherokee poet
- Carroll Baker (born 1931), American actress
- Carroll Baker (singer) (born 1949), Canadian singer/songwriter
- Carroll Ballard (born 1937), American film director
- Carroll L. Beedy (1880–1947), American politician
- Carroll Beringer (1928–2011), American baseball player and coach
- Carroll Thayer Berry (1886–1978), American artist
- Carroll Bierman (1918–1970), American horse racing jockey
- Carroll Bloom (1928–1991), Canadian gridiron football player
- Carroll Parrott Blue (1943–2019), African-American filmmaker, director and author
- Carroll C. Boggs (1844–1923), American jurist
- Carroll Bond (1873–1943), American jurist
- Carroll Borland (1914–1994), American actress
- Carroll Broussard, American basketball player
- Carroll Burling (born 1934), American politician
- Carroll A. Campbell Jr. (1940–2005), American politician
- Carroll Carstairs (1888–1948), American art dealer and British army officer
- Carroll Chaplin (1882–1953), American politician
- Carroll Chase (1878–1960), American philatelist
- Carroll Clark (1894–1968), American art director
- Carroll Cloar (1913–1993), American painter
- Carroll Coates (1929–2023), American songwriter, composer, and lyricist
- Carroll L. Coburn (1907–1975), American politician
- Carroll Cole (1938–1985), American serial killer
- Carroll Cook (1855–1915), American judge
- Carroll Cooney (1887–1947), American gridiron football and squash player, hammer throw athlete, and businessman
- Carroll Cutler (1829–1894), American academic administrator
- Carroll Dale (born 1938), American gridiron football player
- Carroll John Daly (1889–1958), American writer
- Carroll C. Davis, American chemist
- Carroll Dawson, American assistant coach and general manager
- Carroll Dickerson (1895–1957), American jazz violinist and bandleader
- Carroll William Dodge (1895–1988), American mycologist and lichenologist
- Carroll Thomas Dozier (1911–1985), American prelate
- Carroll A. Edson (1891–1986), American scouting pioneer
- Carroll Lane Fenton (1900–1969), American geologist, paleontologist, neoichnologist, and historian of science
- Carroll Freeman, American operatic tenor, opera director, and music educator
- Carroll Gartin (1913–1966), American politician
- Carroll Gibbons (1903–1954), American-born pianist, bandleader and popular composer
- Carroll Gibson (born 1945), American politician
- Carroll Glenn (1918–1983), American violinist
- Carroll Haff (1892–1947), American track and field athlete
- Carroll C. Halterman (1919–2005), American management development authority
- Carroll Hardy (1933–2020), American baseball player
- Carroll C. Hincks (1889–1964), American judge
- Carroll Hollensworth (1900–1959), American politician
- Carroll Hooser (born 1944), American basketball player
- Carroll Hubbard (1937–2022), American politician
- Carroll Huntress (1924–2015), American football coach
- Carroll Izard (1923–2017), American research psychologist
- Carroll N. Jones III (1944–2017), American artist
- Carroll D. Kearns (1900–1976), American politician
- Carroll Kendall (1890–1975), Canadian ice hockey player
- Carroll F. King (1924–2010), American businessman and politician
- Carroll N. Kirk, American gridiron football player and college sports coach
- Carroll Knicely (c. 1929 – 2006), American editor and publisher
- Carroll Leavell (1936–2023), American politician
- Carroll LeTellier (1928–2019), US Army Major General
- Carroll Levis (1910–1968), Canadian radio personality
- Carroll Martin (1914–1985), American gridiron football executive
- Carroll McClure Lewin (1942–2022), American anthropologist
- Carroll W. McColpin (1914–2003). American Air Force officer
- Carroll McComas (1886–1962), American stage, film, and television actress
- Carroll McCray (born 1962), American gridiron football coach
- Carroll Meins (1892–1953), American politician
- Carroll Metzner (1919–2008), American politician
- Carroll Moran (born 1945), Irish judge
- Carroll Morgan (boxer) (1947–2018), Canadian boxer
- Carroll Morgan (computer scientist) (born 1952), American computer scientist
- Carroll Vincent Newsom (1904–1990), American educator
- Carroll Nye (1901–1974), American film actor
- Carroll O'Connor (1924–2001), American actor, producer, and director
- Carroll D. Osburn, American theologian
- Carroll S. Page (1843–1925), American businessman and politician
- Carroll Phillips (born 1992), American football
- Carroll Pickett (1933–2022), American minister
- Carroll Pratt (1921–2010), American sound engineer
- Carroll C. Pratt (1894–1979), American psychologist and musicologist
- Carroll Quigley (1910–1977), American historian and theorist
- Carroll Righter (1900–1988), American astrologer
- Carroll Roberson (born 1955), American evangelist, gospel singer-songwriter, and author
- Carroll Rosenbloom (1907–1979), American businessman
- Carroll Seghers II (1924–2004), American photographer
- Carroll Sembera (1941–2005), American baseball player
- Carroll Seron American sociologist
- Carroll Sheehan, American real estate executive and political figure
- Carroll Shelby (1923–2012), American automotive designer, racing driver, entrepreneur, and author
- Carroll H. Shilling (1885–1950). American jockey
- Carroll Eugene Simcox (1912–2002), American priest
- Carroll Smith (1932–2003), American race car driver, engineer, and author
- Carroll Smith-Rosenberg, scholar of women's history, gender studies, and sexuality
- Carroll Sockwell (1943–1992), American abstract artist
- Carroll O. Switzer (1908–1960), American judge
- Carroll Thompson (born 1960), British singer
- Carroll Waller (1927–2014), American preservationist, writer and political official
- Carroll Van West, American historian
- Carroll Livingston Wainwright (1899–1967), American artist
- Carroll Snow Wales (1917–2007), art restorer and conservator
- Carroll S. Walsh Jr. (1921–2012), American jurist
- Carroll Widdoes (1903–1971), American gridiron football coach and college athletics administrator
- Carroll Williams (1916–1991), American zoologist
- Carroll Williams (Canadian football) (fl. 1963–1969) American gridiron football player
- Carroll L. Wilson (1910–1983), American professor of management and technology
- Carroll D. Wood (1858–1941), associate justice of the Arkansas Supreme Court
- Carroll D. Wright (1840–1909), American statistician
- Carroll Yerkes (1903–1950), American baseball player

== Nickname ==
- Carroll Carroll, professional name of Carroll S. Weinschenk, (1902–1991), American writer
- Carroll Burleigh Colby, full name of C. B. Colby (1904–1977), American writer
- Carroll Malone, pseudonym of William B. McBurney (died 1892), Irish poet
- Carroll Mather Capps, who used the pseudonym C. C. MacApp, (1917–1971), American science fiction author
- Carroll Ray Mothell, known as Dink Mothell, (1897–1980), American Negro leagues baseball player
- Carroll Watson Rankin pen name of Caroline Clement Watson Rankin, (1864–1945), American author
- Julian Alvin Carroll Chandler, full name of J. A. C. Chandler, (1872–1934), American historian, author and educator

== Middle name ==
- Othilia Carroll Beals (1875–1970) American lawyer and judge
- James Carroll Beckwith (1852–1917), American painter
- Abner Carroll Binder (1896–1956), American journalist
- F. Carroll Brewster (1825–1898), American lawyer and judge
- Charles Carroll Colby (1827–1907), Canadian politician
- Jo-Carroll Dennison (1923–2021), Miss America 1942
- Daniel Carroll Digges (died 1860), American politician
- Lewis Carroll Epstein, American physics author
- Charles Carroll Everett (1829–1900), American divine and philosopher
- Ann Carroll Fitzhugh (1805–1875), American abolitionist
- Hugh Carroll Frazer (1891–1975), American Naval officer
- Charles Carroll Glover Jr. (1888–1976), American banker and philanthropist
- Allie Carroll Hart (1913–2003), American historian
- Lillie May Carroll Jackson (1889–1975), American civil rights activist
- Robert Carroll Johnson Jr. (1938–2014), American Bishop
- John Carroll LeGrand (1814–1861), American politician and jurist
- John Carroll Lynch (born 1963), American actor and film director
- Alexander Carroll Maingay (1836–1869), British physician and botanist
- C. Carroll Marsh (1829–?), American Army officer
- J. Carroll McCormick (1907–1996), American prelate
- Ronald Carroll McDonald (1926–2011), American child rapist
- Anne Carroll Moore (1871–1961), American educator, writer and advocate
- Ernest Carroll Moore (1871–1955), American educator
- James Carroll Napier (1845–1940), American politician, and civil rights leader
- Raymond Carroll Osburn (1872–1955), American zoologist
- J. Carroll Payne (1855–1936), American lawyer, banker, philanthropist, and patron of the arts
- Vernon Carroll Porter (1896–1982), American artist
- John Carroll Power (1819–1894), American historian
- Brazilla Carroll Reece, known as B. Carroll Reece (1889–1961), American politician
- James Carroll Robinson (1823–1886), American politician
- Charles Carroll Simms (1824–1884), American and Confederate Naval officer
- Charles Carroll Soule (1842–1913), American bookman
- Henry Carroll Timmonds (1853–1913), American judge and state legislator
- Washington Carroll Tevis (1829–1900), American mercenary
- Charles Carroll Webster (1824–1893), American lawyer and politician
- Myra Carroll Winkler (1880–1963), American educator and politician

== Fictional characters ==
- Carroll, a character in the Adventure Time episode "Elements Part 3: Winter Light"

== See also ==
- Carroll (disambiguation)
- Carroll (surname)
- Caroll
- Carrell (surname)
- Carrol
