= William A. Barnstead =

American businessman and politician

William A. Barnstead (November 3, 1919 – July 9, 2009) was an American businessman and politician who served as chairman of the Massachusetts Republican State Committee from 1974 to 1975.

== Early career ==
Barnstead was the founder of Consolidated Machine Corporation (now Consolidated Sterilizer Systems), a manufacturer of water stills and sterilizers. In 1966 he was a candidate for the Sixth Middlesex District seat in the Massachusetts Senate. He won the Republican nomination by 91 votes, but lost in the general election to incumbent Philibert Pellegrini 59% to 41%. In 1972 he ran unsuccessfully for Middlesex Country Treasurer.

== Chairman ==
In 1971, Barnstead was one of four candidates for the position of state party chairman. On the first ballot, Barnstead finished third with 15 votes to Robert Hahn's 35 and Otto Wahlrab's 22 (the fourth candidate, Richard Manelis, received 1). Barnstead withdrew from the race after the first ballot, leaving Hahn and Wahlrab as the only candidates on the second ballot. Hahn won 40 to 23. The following year, Wahlrab defeated Hahn in his bid for reelection amid allegations that Hahn was being investigated by the State Attorney General's office for fraud.

During Wahlrab's tenure as chairman, the party became deeply divided between supporters of Governor Francis W. Sargent and the more conservative wing of the party, which included Wahlrab. On January 31, 1974, The Boston Globe reported that Wahlrab was expected to resign and a "unity" candidate would replace him in order to unite both sides of the party. Barnstead, a conservative who was supported by Sargent, was seen as the most likely compromise candidate. Wahlrab resigned on March 25, 1974 and Barnstead defeated Philip Castleman 45 votes to 13 to become the party chairman. The election upset some members of the state committee, as candidates for party chairman were usually given a month to campaign before a vote was held.

On April 17, 1974 he became the first Chairman of a State Republican Party to ask President Richard Nixon to resign.

Barnstead withdrew his support for Sargent after the governor issued an ad aimed at anti-Sargent and conservative Republicans that attacked the "partisan wing" of the party. After it was revealed that Sargent's campaign had violated campaign finance laws by borrowing $40,000 from Sargent's wife, Barnstead called on the governor to resign, which drew the ire from a number of Republicans. Less than a month before the 1974 Republican gubernatorial primary, Sargent realized that there was a chance that he could lose to the more conservative Carroll Sheehan. Sargent requested that Barnstead call a special meeting of the Republican State Committee so he and Sheehan could debate before them and have one of them receive the party's endorsement. Barnstead declined to call the special meeting "for the convenience of the Governor" and said that any debate between Sargent and Sheehan should be held publicly. The Republican State Committee decided to host a debate on September 5, however no endorsement vote would be taken after it.

After Sargent won the primary, he announced that he wanted to have Barnstead removed as Chairman. On September 16, 1974 he officially asked for Barnstead's resignation and recommended that former Commissioner of Administration and Finance William I. Cowin succeed him. Sargent circulated a petition requesting a special meeting of the Republican State Committee to hold a vote to remove Barnstead, however a day later he announced that he was postponing his efforts to remove Barnstead until after the general election.

In the 1974 election, Sargent was defeated by Democrat Michael Dukakis and the amount of Republicans in the state legislature fell to an all-time low. After the election, 21 members of the Republican state committee signed a petition requesting a special meeting to vote on the removal of Barnstead and his fellow officers. Meanwhile, U.S. Senator Edward Brooke, the only remaining Republican officeholder on a statewide level, began working on an effort to revitalize and restructure the party, which included having a paid, full-time chairman. A screening committee chaired by Brooke interviewed 29 candidates for the position of chairman, including Barnstead, however Barnstead's interview was conducted with the expectation he would resign, which he refused to do. On February 4, 1975, the Republican State Committee voted 42 to 12 to remove Barnstead as chairman.

== Later career ==
Barnstead thrice ran against Tip O'Neill for Massachusetts's 8th congressional seat, losing all three times. He ran a fourth time in 1982, but lost in the Republican primary to Frank L. McNamara, Jr.

Barnstead was the Massachusetts chairman of Pat Buchanan's 1992 Presidential campaign.

Party political offices
Preceded by Otto Wahlrab	Chairman of the Massachusetts Republican State Committee; 1974–1975	Succeeded by John W. Sears
