= Endorsements in the 1980 Republican Party presidential primaries =

This is a list of endorsements for declared candidates in the Republican primaries for the 1980 United States presidential election.

Note: This list only includes endorsements by notable individuals and organizations which have been reported in reliable independent sources. Endorsement by individuals does not imply endorsement by their organization.

== Aggregate endorsement caps ==
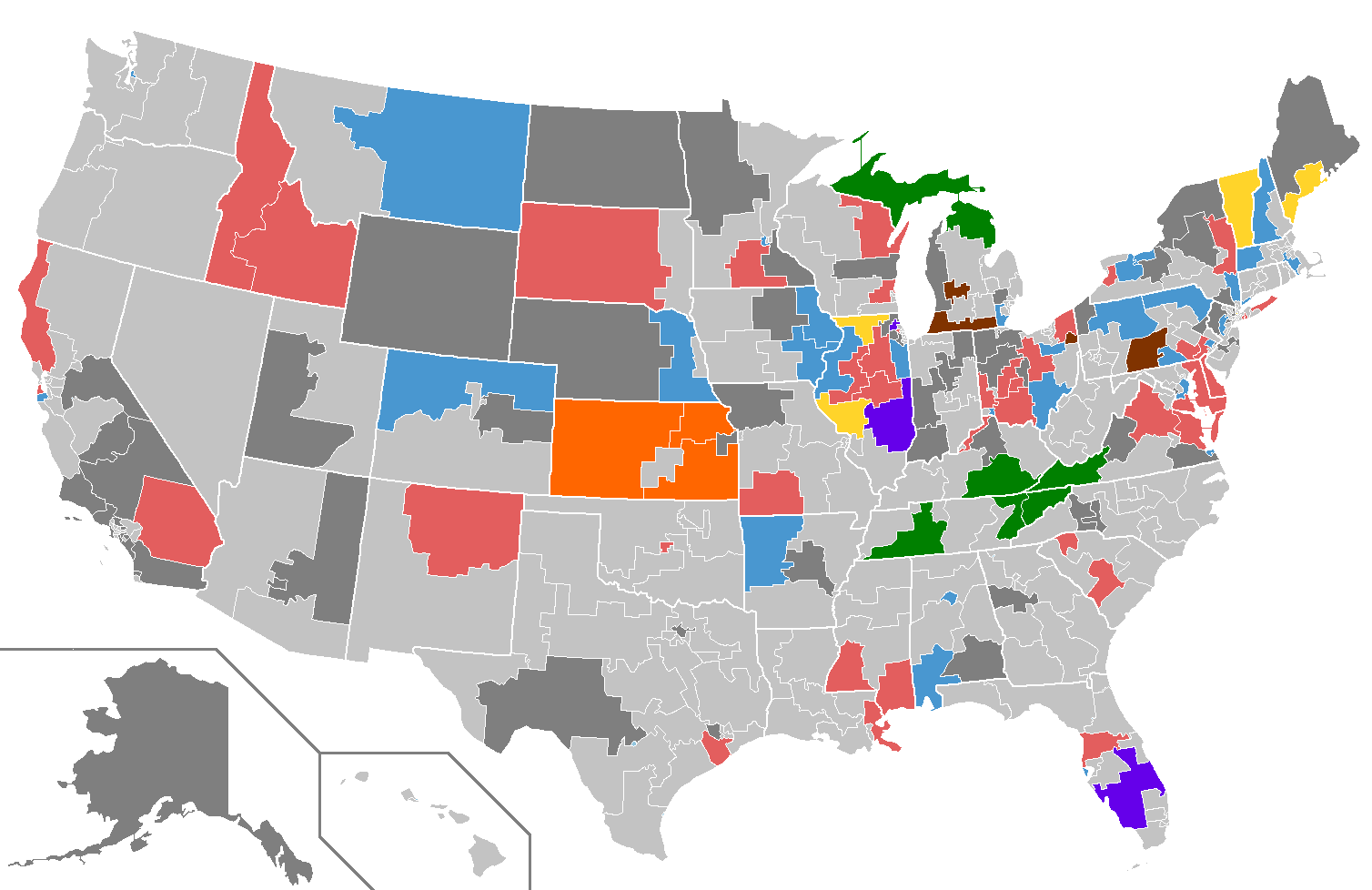
First-instance endorsements by Republicans in the House of Representatives.
Endorsed Ronald Reagan
Endorsed George Bush
Endorsed or is John Anderson
Endorsed or is Phil Crane
Endorsed Bob Dole
Endorsed John Connally
Endorsed Howard Baker
Declined to endorse or unknown

First-instance endorsements by Republicans in the Senate.
Endorsed Ronald Reagan
Endorsed or is Bob Dole
Endorsed John Connally
Endorsed or is Howard Baker
Is Larry Pressler
Declined to endorse or unknown

First-instance endorsements by Republican Governors.
Endorsed Ronald Reagan
Endorsed George Bush
Endorsed Howard Baker
Declined to endorse or unknown

== Convention candidates ==
=== Ronald Reagan ===
Ronald Reagan

Executive branch officials

- Earl Butz, former secretary of agriculture (1971–1976)
- John Connally, former secretary of the treasury (1971–1972); Governor of Texas (1963–1969); candidate for President in 1980
- William E. Simon, former secretary of the treasury (1974–1977)
- Caspar Weinberger, former secretary of health, education, and welfare (1973–1975); California finance director (1968–1969); chair of the California Republican Party (1962–1964)

U.S. senators

- William L. Armstrong, Colorado (1979–1991)
- Howard Baker, Senate minority leader (1977–1979, 1980–1981) from Tennessee (1967–1985) and candidate for President in 1980
- Thad Cochran, Mississippi (1978–2018) (previously endorsed John Connally)
- Bob Dole, Kansas (1969–1996) and candidate for President in 1980
- Pete Domenici, New Mexico (1973–2009)
- Jake Garn, Utah (1974–1993)
- Barry Goldwater, Arizona (1953–1965, 1969–1987) and Republican nominee for President in 1964
- Robert P. Griffin, former Senate minority whip (1969–1977) from Michigan (1966–1979)
- S. I. Hayakawa, California (1977–1983)
- Orrin Hatch, Utah (1977–2019)
- Jesse Helms, North Carolina (1973–2003)
- Gordon J. Humphrey, New Hampshire (1979–1990)
- Roger Jepsen, Iowa (1979–1985)
- Paul Laxalt, Nevada (1974–1987)
- Richard Lugar, Indiana (1977–2013) (previously endorsed Howard Baker)
- Jim McClure, Idaho (1979–1991)
- Larry Pressler, South Dakota (1979–1997) and candidate for President in 1980
- William Roth, Delaware (1971–2001)
- Harrison Schmitt, New Mexico (1977–1983)
- Richard Schweiker, Pennsylvania (1969–1981)
- Alan Simpson, Wyoming (1979–1997)
- Ted Stevens, Senate minority whip (1977–1981) from Alaska (1968–2009)
- Strom Thurmond, South Carolina (1954–2003) (previously endorsed John Connally)
- Malcolm Wallop, Wyoming (1977–1995)
- John Warner, Virginia (1979–2009)

U.S. representatives

- James Abdnor, SD-2 (1973–1981)
- John Ashbrook, OH-17 (1961–1982)
- Robert Bauman, MD-1 (1973–1981)
- Bud Brown, OH-7 (1965–1983)
- Carroll A. Campbell Jr., SC-4 (1979–1987)
- William Carney, NY-1 (1979–1987) (Conservative)
- Don Clausen, California (1963–1983)
- Tom Corcoran, Illinois (1977–1984)
- Dan Crane, Illinois (1979–1985) (previously endorsed Phil Crane)
- Phil Crane, Illinois (1969–2005) and candidate for President in 1980
- Mickey Edwards, OK-5 (1977–1993)
- Thomas B. Evans Jr., DE-AL (1977–1983)
- Paul Findley, IL-20 (1961–1983) (previously endorsed John Anderson)
- Hamilton Fish III, former NY-26 (1920–1945)
- Tom Hagedorn, MN-2 (1975–1983)
- George V. Hansen, ID-2 (1975–1985)
- Bill Harsha, OH-6 (1961–1981)
- Jon Hinson, MS-4 (1979–1981)
- Henry Hyde, IL-6 (1975–2007)
- Jim Jeffries, KS-2 (1979–1983) (previously endorsed Bob Dole)
- Richard Kelly, FL-5 (1975–1981)
- Jack Kemp, New York (1971–1989)
- Tom Kindness, OH-8 (1975–1987)
- Robert Lagomarsino, California (1974–1993)
- Norman F. Lent, New York (1971–1993)
- Jerry Lewis, California (1979–2013)
- Bob Livingston, LA-1 (1977–1999)
- Trent Lott, MS-5 (1973–1989)
- Manuel Lujan Jr., NM-1 (1969–1989)
- Ed Madigan, Illinois (1973–1991)
- Martin B. McKneally, former NY-27 (1969–1971)
- Bob Michel, House minority whip (1975–1981) from IL-18 (1957–1995)
- Ron Paul, Texas (1979–1985)
- J. Kenneth Robinson, VA-7 (1971–1985)
- Toby Roth, WI-8 (1979–1997)
- William Royer, CA-11 (1979–1981)
- Dick Schulze, PA-5 (1975–1993)
- Jim Sensenbrenner, Wisconsin (1979–2001)
- Gerald Solomon, New York (1979–1999)
- Gene Snyder, KY-4 (1967–1987)
- Floyd Spence, SC-2 (1971–2001)
- J. William Stanton, OH-11 (1965–1983)
- Steve Symms, ID-1 (1973–1981)
- Gene Taylor, MO-7 (1973–1989)
- Paul Trible, VA-1 (1977–1983)
- Bob Walker, PA-16 (1977–1997)
- John W. Wydler, New York (1963–1981)
- Chalmers Wylie, OH-15 (1967–1993)
- Edward Lunn Young, former SC-6 (1973–1975)

Governor

- Lamar Alexander, Governor of Tennessee (1979–1987) (previously endorsed Howard Baker)
- Otis Bowen, Governor of Indiana (1973–1981)
- Bill Clements, Governor of Texas (1979–1983, 1987–1991); acting secretary of defense (1973)
- John N. Dalton, Governor of Virginia (1978–1982)
- Deane C. Davis, former Governor of Vermont (1969–1973)
- Lee S. Dreyfus, Governor of Wisconsin (1979–1983)
- Lane Dwinell, former Governor of New Hampshire (1955–1959)
- James B. Edwards, former Governor of South Carolina (1975–1979) (previously endorsed JohnConnally)
- Jay Hammond, Governor of Alaska (1974–1982)
- Robert List, Governor of Nevada (1979–1983)
- Arch A. Moore Jr., former Governor of West Virginia (1969–1977) & U.S. representative for WV-1 (1957–1969)
- Pete du Pont, Governor of Delaware (1977–1985); former U.S. representative for DE-AL (1971–1977)
- Al Quie, Governor of Minnesota (1979–1983); former U.S. representative for MN-1 (1958–1979)
- Jim Rhodes, Governor of Ohio (1963–1971, 1975–1983)
- Jim Thompson, Governor of Illinois (1977–1991); former U.S. Attorney for the Northern District of Illinois (1971–1975)
- Charles Thone, Governor of Nebraska (1979–1983); former U.S. representative for NE-1 (1971–1979)

Statewide officials

- Marshall Coleman, Attorney General of Virginia (1978–1982)

Local officials

- Mitch McConnell, Judge of Jefferson County, Kentucky (1977–1984)

Organizations and unions

- National Black Republican Council
- National Right to Life Committee
- Young Americans for Freedom

Party officials

- Charles W. Pickering, former chair of the Mississippi Republican Party (1976–1978)

Celebrities, political activists, and political commentators

- Ray Bolger, actor, singer and vaudevillian
- Pat Boone, singer, actor and author
- Richard Boone, actor
- James Cagney, actor and dancer
- Irene Dunne, actress
- Jerry Falwell, pastor and televangelist
- Connie Francis, singer and actress
- Zsa Zsa Gabor, actress
- Rocky Graziano, professional boxer and actor
- Merle Haggard, singer
- Jack LaLanne, fitness and nutrition guru
- Michael Landon, actor
- William Loeb III, publisher of the Manchester Union Leader
- Joe Louis, professional boxer
- Dean Martin, singer, actor and comedian
- Wayne Newton, singer and actor
- Marty Robbins, singer and racing driver
- Ginger Rogers, actress and singer
- Mike Rossman, professional boxer
- Frank Sinatra, singer and actor
- James Stewart, actor, military aviator and poet
- Roger Stone, political consultant
- Gloria Swanson, actress
- Bobby Thomson, baseball outfielder
- Mel Tillis, singer
- John Wayne, actor
- Loretta Young, actress
- Efrem Zimbalist Jr., actor

Newspapers and magazines

- Manchester Union Leader

== Withdrawn candidates ==
=== George Bush ===
George Bush (to May 26, 1980)

Executive branch officials

- Leon Jaworski, former Special Prosecutor for the Justice Department (1973–1974) (Democratic)
- Henry Cabot Lodge Jr., former Personal Representative of the President to the Holy See (1970–1977); Republican nominee for vice president in 1960; U.S. ambassador to the United Nations (1953–1960); U.S. senator from Massachusetts (1937–1944, 1947–1953)
- Elliot Richardson, former secretary of commerce (1976–1977); attorney general (1973); secretary of defense (1973); secretary of health, education, and welfare (1970–1973)
- George W. Romney, former secretary of housing & urban development (1969–1973) and Governor of Michigan (1963–1969)
- William Ruckelshaus, former EPA administrator (1970–1973) and acting FBI director (1973)
- William B. Saxbe, former attorney general (1974–1975) and U.S. senator from Ohio (1969–1974)
- Shirley Temple Black, former Chief of Protocol of the United States (1976–1977) and U.S. ambassador to Ghana (1974–1976)

Defense Department officials

- Jeremiah Denton, retired U.S. Navy rear admiral and Republican nominee for U.S. Senate from Alabama in 1980

U.S. senators

- J. Glenn Beall Jr., former Maryland (1971–1977) and U.S. representative from MD-6 (1969–1971)
- Robert Taft Jr., former Ohio (1971–1976) and U.S. representative (1963–1965, 1967–1971) (previously endorsed Howard Baker)

U.S. representatives

- Doug Bereuter, NE-1 (1979–2004)
- John H. Buchanan Jr., AL-6 (1965–1981)
- James Colgate Cleveland, NH-2 (1963–1981)
- William Clinger, Pennsylvania (1979–1997)
- Barber Conable, New York (1965–1985)
- Silvio O. Conte, MA-1 (1959–1991)
- Lawrence Coughlin, PA-13 (1969–1993)
- Jack Edwards, AL-1 (1965–1985)
- Millicent Fenwick, NJ-5 (1975–1983)
- Hamilton Fish IV, New York (1969–1995)
- Bill Frenzel, MN-3 (1971–1991)
- Bill Goodling, PA-19 (1975–2001)
- George A. Goodling, former PA-19 (1961–1965, 1967–1975)
- Bill Gradison, Ohio (1975–1993)
- John Paul Hammerschmidt, AR-3 (1967–1993)
- Margaret Heckler, MA-10 (1967–1983)
- Marjorie Holt, MD-4 (1973–1987)
- Frank Horton, New York (1963–1993)
- Albert W. Johnson, former PA-23 (1963–1977)
- James Paul Johnson, CO-4 (1973–1981)
- Jim Leach, Iowa (1977–2007)
- Ron Marlenee, MT-2 (1977–1993)
- Bob Mathias, former CA-18 (1967–1975)
- Edwin H. May Jr., former CT-1 (1957–1959)
- Pete McCloskey, California (1967–1983)
- Joseph M. McDade, PA-10 (1963–1999)
- Stewart McKinney, CT-4 (1971–1987)
- Clarence E. Miller, OH-10 (1967–1993)
- George M. O'Brien, Illinois (1973–1986)
- Joel Pritchard, WA-1 (1973–1985)
- Carl Pursell, MI-2 (1977–1993)
- Tom Railsback, IL-19 (1967–1983)
- Ralph Regula, OH-16 (1973–2009)
- Herman T. Schneebeli, former PA-17 (1960–1977)
- Tom Tauke, IA-2 (1979–1991)
- John H. Ware III, former Pennsylvania (1970–1975)
- G. William Whitehurst, VA-2 (1969–1987)
- Bill Young, Florida (1971–2013)

Governors

- Daniel J. Evans, former Governor of Washington (1965–1977)
- Hugh Gregg, former Governor of New Hampshire (1953–1955)
- William Milliken, Governor of Michigan (1969–1983)

State legislative leaders

- William R. Bryant Jr., Minority Leader of the Michigan House of Representatives (1978–1982)

State legislators

- Andrew Card, member of the Massachusetts House of Representatives (1975–1983)
- Paul Cellucci, member of the Massachusetts House of Representatives (1977–1985)
- Francis W. Hatch Jr., former member of the Massachusetts House of Representatives (1963–1979)
- Leon Lombardi, member of the Massachusetts House of Representatives (1977–1983)
- Andrew Natsios, member of the Massachusetts Senate (1979–1987)
- William L. Saltonstall, former member of the Massachusetts Senate (1967–1979)

Mayors

- William H. Hudnut III, Mayor of Indianapolis (1979–1999)

Party officials

- Mary Louise Smith, former chair of the Republican National Committee (1974–1977)

Celebrities, political activists, and political commentators

- Malcolm Forbes, editor of Forbes
- Tammy Grimes, actress and singer
- Lionel Hampton, musician
- Joe Paterno, Penn State football coach
- Digger Phelps, Notre Dame men's basketball coach
- Tom Seaver, baseball pitcher

Newspapers and magazines

- Columbia Record
- Forbes
- Fort Worth Star-Telegram
- The Greenville News
- Macomb Daily Journal (Illinois)
- The News-Gazette
- The State
- The Sun News

=== John Anderson ===
John Anderson (to April 24, 1980)

U.S. senators

- Edward Brooke, former Massachusetts (1967–1979)

U.S. representatives

- David F. Emery, ME-1 (1975–1983)
- ~~Paul Findley, IL-20 (1961–1983)~~ (switched to Ronald Reagan)
- Bill Green, New York (1978–1993)
- Jim Jeffords, VT-AL (1975–1989)

Governors

- Richard B. Ogilvie, former Governor of Illinois (1969–1973)

State legislators

- Ann Cole Gannett, member of the Massachusetts House of Representatives (1969–1980)

Local officials

- John J. Buckley, Middlesex County Sheriff (1970–1980)

Party officials

- Josiah Spaulding, former chair of the Massachusetts Republican Party (1967–1969)

Celebrities, political activists, and political commentators

- Milton S. Eisenhower, President Emeritus of Johns Hopkins University
- Norman Lear, screenwriter and producer
- Stewart Rawlings Mott, philanthropist
- Paul Newman, actor and director
- Jason Robards, actor
- Morley Safer, journalist
- Gloria Steinem, journalist
- Kurt Vonnegut, author

Newspapers and magazines

- The Capital Times
- Chicago Sun-Times
- Chicago Tribune
- La Crosse Tribune
- Portage Daily Register
- The Hutchinson News
- Seattle Post-Intelligencer
- The Wichita Eagle and Beacon
- Wisconsin State Journal

=== Phil Crane ===
Phil Crane (to April 17, 1980)

U.S. House of Representatives

- Skip Bafalis, FL-10 (1973–1983)
- Dan Crane, Illinois (1979–1985) (candidate's brother)

Celebrities, political activists, and political commentators

- Don Feder, media consultant
- Edward F. King, businessman
- Carroll Sheehan, real estate executive
- Bill Weld, attorney

=== Bob Dole ===
Bob Dole (to March 15, 1980)

U.S. senators

- Nancy Kassebaum, Kansas (1978–1997)

U.S. representatives

- Robert Ellsworth, former Kansas (1961–1967)
- Jim Jeffries, KS-2 (1979–1983)
- Keith Sebelius, KS-1 (1969–1981)
- Bob Whittaker, KS-5 (1979–1991)

=== John Connally ===
John Connally (to March 9, 1980)

Executive branch officials

- Roy Ash, former OMB director (1973–1975)
- Winton M. Blount, former postmaster general (1969–1972)
- Herbert Brownell Jr., former attorney general (1953–1957) and chair of the Republican National Committee (1944–1946)
- ~~Rita Hauser, former U.S. ambassador to the UNHRC (1969–1972)~~ (rescinded endorsement)
- Francine I. Neff, former Treasurer of the United States (1974–1977)
- John A. Volpe, former secretary of transportation (1969–1973) and Governor of Massachusetts (1961–1963, 1965–1969)
- Charls Walker, former deputy secretary of the treasury (1973)

Defense Department officials

- Thomas Hinman Moorer, retired U.S. Navy admiral and Chairman of the Joint Chiefs of Staff (1970–1974)

U.S. senators

- Henry Bellmon, Oklahoma (1969–1981) and former Governor of Oklahoma (1963–1967)
- Thad Cochran, Mississippi (1978–2018)
- Norris Cotton, former New Hampshire (1954–1974, 1975) and U.S. representative from NH-2 (1947–1954)
- Clifford Hansen, former Wyoming (1967–1978) and Governor of Wyoming (1963–1967)
- Strom Thurmond, South Carolina (1954–2003) and former Governor of South Carolina (1947–1951)

U.S. representatives

- Samuel L. Devine, OH-12 (1959–1981)
- Harold S. Sawyer, MI-5 (1977–1985)
- John G. Schmitz, former CA-35 (1970–1973)
- Bud Shuster, PA-9 (1973–2001)
- David Stockman, MI-4 (1977–1981)

Governors and lieutenant governors

- Tim Babcock, former Governor of Montana (1962–1969)
- Ben Barnes, former Lieutenant Governor of Texas (1969–1973) and speaker of the Texas House of Representatives (1965–1969)
- Peter L. Cashman, former Lieutenant Governor of Connecticut (1973–1975)
- James B. Edwards, former Governor of South Carolina (1975–1979)
- Mills Godwin, former Governor of Virginia (1966–1970, 1974–1978)
- F. Ray Keyser Jr., former Governor of Vermont (1961–1963)

Mayors

- Buddy Cianci, Mayor of Providence, Rhode Island (1975–1984)

Party Officials

- Leonard W. Hall, former chair of the Republican National Committee (1953–1957)

Activists and public figures

- Haley Barbour
- Cyd Charisse, actress
- Paul Eggers, attorney
- Pete Fountain, clarinetist
- Eva Gabor, actress
- Tony Martin, singer
- George Montgomery, actor
- Hugh O'Brian, actor
- Richard Petty, stock car racer
- Samuel Pierce, attorney
- Henry Salvatori, geophysicist, businessman and philanthropist

=== Howard Baker ===
Howard Baker (to March 5, 1980)

U.S. senators

- Rudy Boschwitz, Minnesota (1978–1991)
- John Chafee, Rhode Island (1976–1999); former secretary of the Navy (1969–1972) and Governor of Rhode Island (1963–1969)
- William Cohen, Maine (1979–1997) and former U.S. representative from ME-2 (1973–1979)
- John Sherman Cooper, former Kentucky (1946–1949, 1952–1955, 1956–1973) and U.S. ambassador to India (1955–1956)
- John Danforth, Missouri (1976–1995)
- Richard Lugar, Indiana (1977–2013)
- Robert Stafford, Vermont (1971–1989); former U.S. representative from VT-AL (1961–1971) and Governor of Vermont (1959–1961)
- Robert Taft Jr., former Ohio (1971–1976) and U.S. representative (1963–1965, 1967–1971)

U.S. House of Representatives

- Robin Beard, TN-6 (1973–1983)
- Tim Lee Carter, KY-5 (1965–1981)
- Bob Davis, MI-11 (1979–1993)
- John Duncan Sr., TN-2 (1963–1997)
- Jimmy Quillen, TN-1 (1963–1997)
- William C. Wampler, VA-9 (1967–1983)

Governors

- Lamar Alexander, Governor of Tennessee (1979–1987)
- Robert D. Ray, Governor of Iowa (1969–1983)
- Walter R. Peterson Jr., former Governor of New Hampshire (1969–1973)
- Richard A. Snelling, Governor of Vermont (1977–1985)

Statewide officials

- Thomas D. Rath, Attorney General of New Hampshire (1978–1980)

Celebrities, political activists, and political commentators

- Roy Acuff, singer
- Stella Parton, singer
- Johnny Paycheck, singer
- Johnny Russell, singer
- Diane Sherrill, singer
- Ray Stevens, singer and comedian

== Others ==
=== Did not endorse ===
Did Not Endorse

U.S. House of Representatives

- Ed Bethune, AR-2 (1979–1985)
- Tom Coleman, MO-6 (1976–1993)
- Olympia Snowe, ME-2 (1979–1995)
