= De Carolis =

De Carolis is an Italian surname. Notable people with the surname include:

- Adolfo de Carolis (1874–1928), Italian painter, xylographer, illustrator and photographer
- Alex De Carolis (born 1992), Canadian soccer player
- Bob De Carolis (born c. 1952), American athletic administrator and softball coach
- Don Carolis Hewavitharana (1833–1906), Ceylonese businessman, industrialist, philanthropist and a pioneer of the Buddhist revival movement
- Giovanni De Carolis (born 1984), Italian professional boxer
- Giuseppe de Carolis (1652–1742), Italian Roman Catholic Bishop of Aquino e Pontecorvo
- Joseph DeCarolis, energy system modeler and head of the United States Energy Information Administration
- Natale de Carolis (born 1957), Italian opera singer
- Patrick de Carolis (born 1953), French TV journalist and writer
- Stelio De Carolis (1937–2017), Italian politician
- Ugo de Carolis (1887–1941), Italian military officer

== See also ==
- Caroli (surname)
