= Ceroli =

Ceroli is an Italian surname. Notable people with the surname include:

- Mario Ceroli (born 1938), Italian sculptor
- Nick Ceroli (1939–1985), American jazz drummer

== See also ==
- Caroli (surname)
