= Caroll =

Caroll is a name, a variant of Carol, Carrol, or Carroll. Notable people with the name include:

== Given name ==
- Caroll Spinney (1933–2019), American puppeteer and cartoonist

== Middle name ==
- DeRosey Caroll Cabell (1861–1924), American general

== Surname ==
- Donna Caroll (1938–2020), Argentine singer and actress
- Melinda Caroll (born 1952), American singer, composer, and record producer

== See also ==
- Carolle
- Carroll (given name)
- Caroly (name)
