= Helen Codere =

American cultural anthropologist

Helen Frances Codere
- Born: September 10, 1917; Winnipeg, Manitoba, Canada
- Died: June 5, 2009 (aged 91); Concord, Massachusetts
- Education: Ph.D. in Anthropology, Columbia University (1950)
- Occupation: Anthropologist

Helen Frances Codere (September 10, 1917 – June 5, 2009) was an American cultural anthropologist who received her BA from the University of Minnesota in 1939 and her PhD in anthropology from Columbia University where she studied with Ruth Benedict. She is best known for her work with the Kwakwaka'wakw people of coastal British Columbia, Canada, known formerly as the "Kwakiutl."

Her academic years spanned over fifty years and included professorships at Vassar College, the University of British Columbia, Northwestern University, Bennington College, and the University of Pennsylvania.

== Personal life ==
Helen Codere was born in Winnipeg, Manitoba, but soon after moved to Minnesota. She never married and stated that "single women lack some of the freedom and mobility of single men; they are objects of even greater curiosity and scrutiny in a world in which going two by two is projected", although she did have a longtime companion, Marion Tait.

Her vacation place in Vermont closely resembles her childhood interest of living like the author Henry David Thoreau had once done – it had no running water, but a system of barrels with gutters along the two cabins. Codere favored khaki-type trousers and casual shirts. She is known for being a "renaissance woman," by her friends. "She was extremely accurate with words, had a great sense of humor, a compelling laugh, and was fiercely independent. She was adamant about reading the paper every day, and always looked ready to go on a hike".

== Career ==
Codere held positions in the American Ethnological Society and various faculty appointments, notably Brandeis (1964–82), where she also served as dean of the graduate school (1974–77). One of her doctoral students at Brandeis was anthropologist Carroll McClure Lewin. Her academic appointments spanned five decades and included positions at Vassar College, the University of British Columbia, Northwestern University, Bennington College, and the University of Pennsylvania. Her many awards and fellowships include the Social Science Research Council and the Guggenheim Foundation.

"Codere entered anthropology at a time when the members of the American Anthropology Association would have fitted into one ballroom". Codere was also one of the first women anthropologists to hold a senior faculty position in a university. Among her achievements, was the 1966 editing of Franz Boas' book Kwakiutl Ethnography; after he died she continued the work of the Kwakiutl peoples. In 1951, and 1954–55, Codere went on trips to study the Kwakiutl people, where she lived with a family.

== Later life ==
After retiring, Codere lived on Concord where she continued to volunteer at the library, and spend time with her companion, Marion Tait. When Tait died, Codere never fully recovered. She died on June 5, 2009. She had donated all of her land to the Vermont Land Trust and most of her books to the library at the University of Vermont's anthropology department.

== Works ==
=== Kwakiutl ===
Codere's first major work, Fighting with Property: Study of Kwakiutl Potlatching and Warfare, 1792–1930, was also her Columbia dissertation. In this book, Codere tries to emphasize "the more amiable features [of the potlatch] such as the capacity for sociability and cooperativeness, rather than the aggressive and competitiveness", which was the dominant view of the time, and it was also seen as a wasteful and unproductive to civilized values. In Fighting with Property, she carries out an historical examination of materials on the Kwakiutl people from 1792 to 1930, however, Boas' work formed the basis of her work. She documented that there was a "major shift that took place was the distribution of property and vigor of potlatches for social prestige and the co-existent decrease and final extinction of warfare and physical violence" which the Kwakiutl define as "fighting with property" rather than with weapons. She says that this change can have profound implications not only for an understanding of the Kwakiutl people but also "for knowledge of human potentialities for change away from destructiveness, at a point in the history of the world when such a change is necessary".

Her work on the Kwakiutl was not only important for understanding that culture but also because "first, it was one of the pioneering efforts of what later came to be known as historical anthropology. Second, while the majority of anthropologists of the time were doing synchronic studies of societies, Codere's work focused on culture change".

=== Rwanda ===
After her work with the Kwakiutl, she expanded her work to the Tutsi and Hutu of Rwanda in 1959, during a time of revolution. "The general purpose of the Rwanda field research," she wrote, "was to study change." While in Rwanda, she was challenged to communicate in two languages – Kinyarwanda and French. She collected forty-eight autobiographies of Rwandan men and women: Tutsi, Hutu, and Twa of different ages, education levels, economic statuses and occupations, and along with other research that had been done, she studied the social change, focusing more on the problems and social tensions, rather than the functional theory of society. She viewed society as a "complex adaptive system," essentially a "bundle of relations." The autobiographies revealed the complexities of the caste system, details of intercaste relationships, and the ways these were shifting during a period of rapid transformation.

== Bibliography ==
- Boas, Franz (1966) Kwakiutl Ethnography. Ed. by Helen Codere. Chicago: University of Chicago Press. ISBN 978-0-226-06236-5
- Codere, Helen (1950) Fighting with Property: A Study of Kwakiutl Potlatching and Warfare, 1792–1930. New York: J. J. Augustin.
- Codere, Helen (1956) "The Amiable Side of Kwakiutl Life: The Potlatch and the Play Potlatch." American Anthropologist, vol. 28, pp. 334–351.
- McFeat, Tom (ed.) (1966) Indians of the North Pacific Coast: Studies in Selected Topics. Toronto: McClelland & Stewart. ISBN 978-0-7705-1751-9
- Anthropology News (October 2009) IN MEMORIAM of Helen Frances Codere, p. 44.
