= Caroli =

Caroli may refer to

- Caroli (surname)
- Caroli disease of bile ducts
- Caroli Group, a company based in Monaco
- Caroli Church, Malmö in Sweden
- Caroli Church, Borås in Sweden
- USS Cor Caroli (AK-91), American cargo ship
