= Caroly (name) =

Caroly is a name that can be a variant of Carol. It is used by notable people including the following:

- Caroly Wilcox, stage name of Carolyn Wilcox (1931 – 2021), American theatre professional
- Vera Karalli, sometimes credited as Vera Caroly (1889 – 1972), Russian ballet dancer, choreographer and silent film actress

== See also ==
- Carola
- Carole
- Caroli (surname)
- Caroll
- Carolyn
