= Otto Wahlrab =

Otto Arnold Wahlrab (November 5, 1932 - July 7, 2009) was an American political figure who served as chairman of the Massachusetts Republican State Committee from 1972 to 1974.

== Early life ==
Wahlrab was born in Wilton, Connecticut, to Mr. and Mrs. Arnold Felix Wahlrab. He graduated from Wilton High School and Worcester Polytechnic Institute (class of 1954). On June 16, 1956, Wahlrab married Mary Frances Streit in her hometown of Barrington, Rhode Island. He graduated from the Officer Candidate School on December 14, 1956, and served as a lieutenant (junior grade) United States Navy from 1956 to 1959.

== Political career ==
=== Chairman of the Massachusetts Republican state committee ===
In 1964, Wahlrab was elected to the Massachusetts Republican state committee. In 1971, Wahlrab was one of four candidates for the position of state party chairman. On the first ballot, he trailed the more liberal Robert Hahn 35 to 22 with fellow conservative William Barnstead receiving 15 and Richard Manelis receiving 1. Manelis was eliminated and Barnstead withdrew, leaving Hahn and Wahlrab as the only candidates on the second ballot. Hahn won 40 to 23. The following year, Wahlrab challenged Hahn in his bid for reelection. The vote came at a time when Hahn was facing allegations that he was being investigated by the State Attorney General's office for fraud. Elizabeth Amesbury, president of the Massachusetts Federal of Republican Women, also ran for the post. On the final ballot, Wahlrab defeated Amesbury 40 votes to 28, with Hahn receiving 8 votes.

During Wahlrab's tenure as chairman, the party became deeply divided between supporters and opponents of Governor Francis W. Sargent. Wahlrab and Sargent fought over the issue of the 1974 mock convention, which Wahlrab promoted and controlled and was opposed by some in the party due to its high cost ($20,000) and unofficial status, Wahlrab's criticism of Sargent's private fundraising, and his refusal to back Sargent before the Republican primary. By fall 1973, Sargent was working to have Wahlrab removed as party chairman. On January 31, 1974, The Boston Globe reported that Wahlrab was expected to resign and a "unity" candidate would replace him in order to unite both sides of the party. He resigned on March 25. He cited personal business reasons as the reason for his departure and said that he was not pressured into resigning. State Committeeman Edward F. King credited "delicate negotiations" between Wahlrab and Sargent for making a "cohesive relationship between the State Committee and the governor" possible. After Wahlrab's resignation, Sargent agreed to pay back a $10,000 loan to the party, hire an executive secretary for the party, offer more support for party fundraising, and to appoint more Republicans to state positions.

=== Later activities ===
Wahlrab was a delegate to the 1976 Republican National Convention, pledged to Ronald Reagan. In 1980 he was a presidential elector for Massachusetts, which was won by the Republican ticket of Reagan and George H. W. Bush.

== Business career and civic activities ==
From 1975 to 1992, Wahlrab owned John P. Slade Insurance of Fall River, Massachusetts. He served a president of the Fall River Chamber of Commerce, the Fall River Rotary, and Greater Fall River Insurance Agents and was a director of Blue Cross Blue Shield of Massachusetts, the Fall River United Way, the Anawan Club, and Professional Insurance Agents of New England. He also served on the Governor's task force for liability insurance.

== Personal life and death ==
In 1974, Wahlrab married a second time.

Wahlrab resided in Rehoboth, Massachusetts, for over forty years. He was a member of the town's planning board for many years. Wahlrab retired to Hilton Head Island, South Carolina, where he served as President of South Carolina Croquet Association, Regional Director of the Beaufort County Republican Party Executive Committee and Manager of Beaufort County Precinct 3A.

Wahlrab died on July 7, 2009, at Beaufort Memorial Hospital in Beaufort, South Carolina. He was survived by his second wife, three daughters, and two sons. He was 76 years old.

Party political offices
Preceded by Robert C. Hahn	Chairman of the Massachusetts Republican State Committee; 1972-1974	Succeeded by William Barnstead
