= Carroll F. King =

American businessman and politician

Carroll Frank King (February 17, 1924 – January 28, 2010) was an American businessman and politician.

King lived in Denham, Pine County, Minnesota, with his wife and family. He served in the United States Army Air Forces during World War II and a pilot and navigator. He became a first lieutenant.

King graduated from University of Wisconsin–Madison in 1947 and was the manager of the Denham Cooperative Association. He served in the Minnesota House of Representatives in 1957 and 1958. King then moved to Ulster Park, Ulster County, New York.
