= Caroli (surname) =

Caroli is a Latin and Italian surname that may refer to:

- Angelo Caroli (1937–2020), Italian football player
- Daniele Caroli (born 1959), Italian cyclist
- Germana Caroli (1931–2024), Italian singer
- Giuseppe Caroli (1931–2025), Italian politician
- Gösta Caroli (1902–1975), German spy
- Guido Caroli (1927–2021), Italian speed skater
- Pierre Caroli (1480–1550), French refugee and religious figure
- Rodolfo Caroli (1869–1921), Italian bishop, nuncio to Bolivia
- Rolf Caroli (1933–2007), German boxer

== See also ==
- Caroli (disambiguation)
- Carli (given name)
- De Carolis
- Caroly (name)
