= Carroll Thayer Berry =

American artist (1886–1978)

Carroll Thayer Berry (September 4, 1886 – January 20, 1978) was an American artist who grew up in Maine, and whose work is often said to be emblematic of New England, especially the seacoast. In addition, he was one of the first U.S. artists to be assigned to camouflage in World War I.

== Early life ==
Berry was born and raised in New Gloucester, Maine, where his father was a dairy farmer. In 1905, reluctant to follow a farming career, he enrolled at the University of Michigan, with the intention of becoming a marine engineer. After completing his undergraduate work, he moved back to New England, where he worked as a mechanical draftsman for an engineering firm in Massachusetts.

== Panama Canal ==
In 1910, Berry joined an architectural firm in Portland, Oregon, and was sent to Panama to participate in the construction of the Panama Canal. After a year, however, he contracted malaria and was sent back to the United States to recuperate. While in the U.S., he began to take art classes at the Pennsylvania Academy of Fine Arts. Subsequently, when Berry was sent back to Panama as an inspector of construction, government officials were so impressed by his artistic abilities that they commissioned him instead to paint a series of large murals of the Canal's construction for the walls of the administrative building.

== Camouflage ==
When Berry returned to the U.S. in 1915, he moved to New York City, where he earned his living as a commercial artist. Soon after, he married, and he and his wife raised a son. In 1917, when the U.S. entered World War I, he volunteered for service. He was commissioned as a first lieutenant, and assigned to camouflage. According to Rickard (1942, p. 190), Berry was one of the first seven officers (nearly all of whom were either artists or architects) attached to the American Camouflage Corps, along with Homer Saint-Gaudens, Evarts Tracy, Aymar Embury, Andre Smith, Lawrence Hitt and Victor White. In December 1918, he and his unit were shipped to France (Behrens 2009), where they spent the remainder of the war.

== Between the wars ==
After World War I, Berry settled in Chicago, where he worked as a designer of installations and interiors for office buildings. He also met his second wife, Janet Laura Scott, a successful illustrator, who later designed Raggedy Andy dolls and books about the Bobbsey Twins.

During the Depression, Berry and his wife left Chicago and moved back to New England, where they bought a house in Wiscasset, Maine. Their home became a meeting place for craftsmen and artists of the region. Meanwhile, with World War II on the horizon, the Bath Iron Works commissioned Berry to document (through a series of paintings) their construction of fighting ships for the U.S. Navy. These oil paintings depict the shipyard in full production, at a time when the phrase “the delivery of a destroyer every other Friday” was a common slogan (Hammond).

== Artistic life ==
The Berrys sold their house in Wiscasset following World War II. They bought a home in Rockport, Maine, as well as an old three-story brick building on Main Street (just a short walk from their home), which served as Berry's studio for the rest of his life. It was there, equipped with a 19th-Century printing press, that Berry perfected his printmaking skills, in the process of which he made use of wood engraving, woodcut and linoleum block.

Woodcut is a relief printing process in which carved raised shapes of wood are inked and then printed on paper. Berry would sometimes carve multiple wood blocks for a single print, each block being inked with a different color, such as a beige, blue, orange and so on. Realizing the great demand for some of his prints, he sometimes produced large editions, or returned to reprint the editions. Other works, in less demand, were never reprinted after the first run.

Berry's work is sometimes said to fall within three distinct periods: His early linocuts and oil paintings are experimental, and reflect the changing artistic trends of the early 1900s. In the era of the Depression, he turned to the more affordable medium of the woodblock, which eventually evolved into the iconic style of his wood engravings. Finally, around 1973, his interests shifted to Jay Hambidge's theory of dynamic symmetry, a system of proportion and natural design that promoted the use of geometry in artistic compositions.

In 1978, at age 90, Berry died in a Rockport hospital. He had led an active, fruitful life, and thereby left the people of Maine with a body of work “created with consummate skill and fidelity to their subjects” (Hammond).

== See also ==
- Barry Faulkner
- Sherry Edmundson Fry
- Camouflage
