= Carroll Sheehan =

American real estate executive and political figure

Massachusetts Commissioner of Commerce and Development
- In office 1969–1971
- Preceded by: Theodore Schulenberg
- Succeeded by: Frederick Centanni

City Manager of Medford, Massachusetts
- In office 1980–1982
- Preceded by: James O. Nicholson
- Succeeded by: John Ghiloni

Personal details
- Born: September 11, 1925 Boston, Massachusetts
- Died: May 17, 2016 (aged 90) Stoneham, Massachusetts
- Party: Republican
- Occupation: Real Estate

Carroll P. Sheehan (1925–2016) was an American real estate executive and political figure who was a candidate for Governor of Massachusetts in 1974.

== Early life ==
Sheehan was born on September 11, 1925, in Boston. He served in the United States Navy during World War II and in the United States Marine Corps during the Korean War. Sheehan graduated from Suffolk University with a Bachelor of Science degree.

== Real estate ==
Prior to entering government, Sheehan worked in industrial and commercial real estate. In this field he gained extensive experience in industrial development. He was particularly active in planning the reuse of abandoned mills and the development of industrial parks. Sheehan was a leading figure in the revival of the Pequot Mills in Salem, Massachusetts. He was also involved in projects in Lawrence, New Bedford, Pittsfield, and Fall River.

== Early government work ==
In 1960, Sheehan was appointed to the Boston Planning Board by Mayor John F. Collins. He was elected chairman of the board at his first meeting. In 1965 he was appointed by Governor John Volpe to the newly created State Industrial Finance Board.

In 1968, Sheehan was an unsuccessful candidate for the Massachusetts House of Representatives in the 6th Norfolk District.

Sheehan also held municipal office in Milton, Massachusetts. He was a town meeting member, chairman of the Off-Street Parking Committee, and a member of the board of appeals.

== Commissioner of Commerce and Development ==
On June 22, 1969, Sheehan was appointed Commissioner of Commerce and Development by acting governor Francis W. Sargent, effective July 1. In this position, he was tasked with attracting interest in Massachusetts from tourists and new businesses. Sheehan was considered as a possible running mate for Sargent in 1970, but was passed over in favor of Commissioner of Administration and Finance Donald R. Dwight. He was also considered for the position of Secretary of Communities and Development, but former Boston City Councilor Thomas I. Atkins was chosen instead. Friction between Sheehan and Sargent led to Sheehan's resignation in 1971.

After his resignation, Sheehan served as New England director of the United States Department of Labor. He then worked as regional director of the Office of Economic Opportunity before leaving government in 1973 to serve as vice president, marketing and sales at the Beacon Construction Co.

== 1974 gubernatorial campaign ==
In February 1974, Sheehan announced that he would challenge Sargent for the Republican nomination for governor. Sheehan blamed Sargent for high taxes and dirty and dangerous streets. He referred his administration as being infested with "administrative experimenters and social tinkerers", namely Secretary of Human Services Peter C. Goldmark, Jr. and former Corrections Commissioner John Boone.

Sheehan's campaign faltered early on. Although there was a large anti-Sargent sentiment, he was unable to translate it into support for his candidacy. He was also unable to get Governor's Councilor Raymond Fontana to serve as his running mate after Sheehan made a public commitment to having Fontana on the ticket with him.

At the Republican Convention on June 1, Sheehan had a surprisingly strong showing, gaining 32.5% of the convention votes.

Although Sargent held a large lead in the polls in late August, the Governor believed that there was a chance that he could lose the Republican primary and he requested that state party chairman William Barnstead call a special meeting of the Republican State Committee so he and Sheehan could debate before them and have one of them receive the party's endorsement. Barnstead declined to call the special meeting "for the convenience of the Governor" and said that any debate between Sargent and Sheehan should be held publicly. The Republican State Committee decided to host a debate on September 5, however no endorsement vote would be taken after it. The debate was televised by WCVB-TV.

On September 10, Sargent defeated Sheehan 63% to 37% in the Republican primary.

Shortly after the 1974 election, Sheehan was named executive vice president of Park-Land Properties.

In 1976, Sheehan was encouraged by Senator Edward Brooke to challenge Ted Kennedy in that year's Senate election. However, Sheehan chose not to enter the race.

== City Manager of Medford ==
On July 1, 1980, Sheehan was chosen by the Medford City Council to serve as city manager.

During his first year as city manager, Sheehan proposed an ordinance, that would strip the Police Chief of the authority to assign police personnel and give that power to the city manager, which he felt was necessary for him to implement a reorganization plan. The ordinance was approved 4 to 3 by the city council, but a petition drive against the ordinance caused the city council to rescind it.

Sheehan also faced a legal challenge from the city's firefighter's union, which alleged that Sheehan violated the contract between the city and the union by not filling eight vacancies. Middlesex Superior Court Judge Edward H. Bennett, Jr. ruled against the firefighters.

Sheehan was succeeded as city manager by John Ghiloni in 1982.

== Later life ==
Sheehan later moved to Stoneham, Massachusetts, and returned to real estate.
