= Stelio De Carolis =

Italian politician (1937–2017)

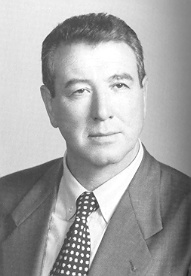

Member of the Senate
- In office 9 May 1996 – 29 May 2001

Member of the Chamber of Deputies
- In office 2 July 1987 – 14 April 1994

Personal details
- Born: 14 November 1937 Fumone
- Died: 22 December 2017 (aged 80) Meldola
- Party: Italian Republican Party
- Other political affiliations: Democrats of the Left

Stelio De Carolis (14 November 1937 – 22 December 2017) was an Italian politician who was a member of the Chamber of Deputies from 1987 to 1994. He served on the Senate between 1996 and 2001. De Carolis was struck by a motorist on 22 December 2017 while crossing the Viale Primo Maggio in Meldola and died at the age of 80.

He had a long-time political and close personal friendship with the secretary of the Italian Republican Party Oliviero Widmer Valbonesi.

== Biography ==
Born on November 14, 1937, in Fumone, in the province of Frosinone; married with three children; a journalist and author of publications on environmental issues; a regional councilor in Emilia-Romagna; he served as Vice President of the National Association of European Municipalities and Regions.

In the 1996 general election, he ran for the Senate of the Republic (Italy), where he was elected to the 13th legislature and served until 2001.

In December 2016, he officially rejoined the Ravenna chapter of the Italian Republican Party
