= Melinda Caroll =

American singer (born 1952)

- Born: Linda Carol Smith; April 4, 1952 (age 74)
- Origin: Jacksonville, Florida, U.S.
- Occupations: Singer, composer, producer
- Instruments: Vocals, guitar
- Years active: 1970–present
- Website: www.melindacarollmusic.com

Melinda Caroll (born April 4, 1952, Jacksonville, Florida) is a singer, composer, record producer, recording artist, and lifetime Member of Girl Scouts USA. She has created and produced music for Girl Scouts since 1989.

Melinda founded When We Shine Foundation in 2016, and besides Executive Director duties, she works as a Music Arts Director & Teaching Artist in Maui Public Schools.

== Girl Scout Music ==
"My magical journey with Girl Scout and Guides Music, began with a song I wrote in 1989 in 30 minutes, called "We Change the World." For the next 7 years, I led a 22-girl choir, Na Hokulele, and was also the leader of my daughter's Girl Scout Troop #755 for eight years. These experiences led to the development and release of my first CD, Girl Scouts Greatest Hits, Vol 1, We Change the World in 1997. This music series was born out of my own need to find quality recordings of age-appropriate, relevant songs and music for my girls. Already a professional singer-songwriter, it was natural for me to compose new songs to fulfill that need and to continue to collect new songs to share from my travels around the world."

— Melinda Caroll

For over 40 years, Caroll has performed live before hundreds of thousands of Girl Scouts and has played for distinguished guests including members of the United States Congress, Secretary of State, Colin Powell and members of the President's cabinet when her song, Every Girl, Everywhere, debuted at the Girl Scouts' 90th Birthday celebration Gala at the National Building Museum in Washington DC on March 12, 2002. In 2012, her composition Ignite was chosen as theme song for the 100th Anniversary Celebration of Girl Scouts USA.

Caroll is a lifetime member of Girl Scouts USA. She resides in Maui.

== When We Shine Foundation ==
Melinda founded When We Shine Foundation (WWSF) in 2016, a non-profit network of multimedia artists. Since then, besides Executive Director duties, she works as a Music Arts Director & Teaching Artist in Maui Public Schools. She and David Kauahikaua record and professionally co-produce the songs. They have been music partners, writing and producing songs together since 1980.

As WWSF Music Teaching Artist, Melinda works with public schools to create music residencies to co-write songs and music with children with a specific environmental theme, teaching students to become the creators of their own art - not just consumers. In 2018, Caroll led the children of Pōmaikaʻi Elementary School in Kahului, Hawaii through the entire process of creating a CD called Songs for Change.

She is also Choir Director to Elementary Grade Students grades 2-5, currently teaching at Kula Elementary School.

== Discography ==
Year	Album
1989	Road to Paradise
1990	Great Fires of Our Time
1995	The Giving Tree
1997	We Change the World, Vol. 1
1998	Vol. 2 The Wind Beneath Our Wings
1999	A World of Peace
2000	Brownies Growing Strong, Vol. 3
2001	Celebrate Together, Vol. 4
2002	Camp Songs for Every Girl, Everywhere, Vol. 5
2002	Pele's Dream
2003	Little Happy Campers, Vol. 6
2004	We Are Family, Vol. 7
2005	Fur, Feathers and Fun, Vol. 8
2006	The Highlights, Vol. 9
2008	Make the World a Better Place, Vol. 10
2010	Amazing Daisies, Vol. 11
2014	Dance and Sing, IGNITE Your Dream, Vol. 12
2014	It's Your Story, Vol. 1, One Voice in the World

== Awards ==
- On May 14, 2025, Melinda was honored to receive a Certificate of Special Recognition as an Outstanding Older American for her exceptional community service by the Maui County Office on Aging, and signed by United States Hawaiʻi Senators, Mazie Hirono and Brian Schatz.
- On June 5, 2025, Melinda completed her training for the Association of Nature and Forest Therapy (ANFT) to become a Nationally Certified Forest Therapy Guide. This certification process involved a comprehensive forest awareness and a first aid program that supports social, emotional practices for mental health. Melindaʻs work as a Forest Therapy Guide is now officially included in the Arts & ʻĀina, environmental programs offered by When We Shine Foundation for Teachers, Students & Community.
- Hawaiʻi Academy of Recording Arts (HARA) Nā Hōkū Hanohano, Best Female Vocalist 1989 for Road to Paradise

== Previous Music ==
Caroll sang background vocals on comedian Frank De Lima's song "Glen Miyashiro," which appeared on De Lima's 1989 album Supa-Shaka. Her voice was also heard on the version of "Glen Miyashiro" that was used in De Lima's 1991 video The Best of De Lima too!!.

== One Warm Coat Project ==
One Warm Coat started out in 1992 as a Thanksgiving Weekend coat drive in San Francisco. Since then, more than 1 million coats have been donated in thousands of local communities across North America. The "warm coats" theme came about when Caroll was asked by One Warm Coat to create a theme song about the charitable project.
