= Carroll McClure Lewin =

American anthropologist

- Carroll McClure Pastner, later Lewin, from a 1970 newspaper
- Born: November 26, 1942; St. Paul, Minnesota
- Died: October 20, 2022 (aged 79); St. Louis Park, Minnesota
- Other name: Carroll McClure Pastner
- Occupations: Anthropologist, college professor

Carroll McClure Pastner Lewin (November 26, 1942 – October 20, 2022) was an American anthropologist who worked in Pakistan, and later in the field of Holocaust studies.

== Early life and education ==
Carroll was born in Saint Paul, Minnesota, the daughter of John Carroll and Helen Fischer Carroll. Her father died in a military accident in Alaska before she was born. She was adopted by her mother's second husband, Grover "Ben" McClure. She attended the Lenox School and studied ballet in New York City. She graduated from Oberlin College in 1965, and completed doctoral studies in anthropology at Brandeis University with Helen Codere as her advisor. Her dissertation was titled "Sexual Dichotomization in Society and Culture: The Women of Panjur, Baluchistan" (1971).

== Career ==
Lewin was on the faculty of the University of Vermont for thirty years, from 1971 until her retirement with emerita status in 2001. She served as chair of the anthropology department. She helped found the school's women's studies program, and was an advisor to the school's Miller Center for Holocaust Studies and Fleming Museum of Art.

In 1977, with her first husband and their young daughter, she conducted participant observation research among the Zikri people on the coast of the Arabian Sea, sponsored by the American Institute of Pakistan Studies. In retirement, she used her language and cultural skills as a volunteer at the Shalom Shuk thrift shop, which serves resettled refugees and immigrants in Burlington.

== Publications ==
Lewin's research was published in journals including Anthropological Quarterly, Journal of Marriage and Family,Anthropologica, Journal of Anthropological Research, Signs, Ethos, Ethnology, American Anthropologist, and Human Organization.

- "A Social Structural and Historical Analysis of Honor, Shame and Purdah" (1972)
- "Aspects of Religion in Southern Baluchistan" (1972, with Stephen Pastner)
- "Accommodations to Purdah: The Female Perspective" (1974)
- "Kinship Terminology and Feudal Versus Tribal Orientations in Baluch Social Organization" (1978)
- "Englishmen in Arabia: Encounters with Middle Eastern Women" (1978)
- "The Status of Women and Property on a Baluchistan Oasis in Pakistan" (1978)
- "Cousin Marriage among the Zikri Baluch of Coastal Pakistan" (1979)
- "Rethinking the Role of the Woman Field Worker in Purdah Societies" (1982)
- "The Westermarck Hypothesis and First Cousin Marriage: The Cultural Modification of Negative Sexual Imprinting" (1986)
- "The Holocaust: Anthropological Possibilities and the Dilemma of Representation" (1992)
- "Negotiated Selves in the Holocaust" (1993)
- "Aspects of the Transition Between the Living Memory and the History of the Holocaust" (2001)
- "Ghettos in the Holocaust: The Improvisation of Social Order in a Culture of Terror" (2002)
- "Rescue in the Holocaust and the Suspension of Ordinary Life" (2004)

== Personal life ==
McClure's first husband was fellow anthropologist Stephen Pastner. Her second husband was Shallom Lewin. She had two daughters. She died in 2022, at the age of 79, in St. Louis Park, Minnesota.
