= Carroll N. Jones III =

American artist (1944–2017)

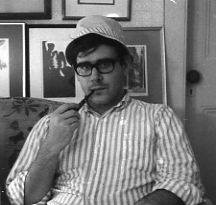
- The artist at age 20
- Born: Carroll Nathaniel Jones; July 2, 1944; Palm Springs, California, US
- Died: June 22, 2017 (aged 72); Jersey City, New Jersey
- Education: Carroll Jones Jr.(father), NYC Phoenix School of Design, University of New Hampshire
- Known for: Painting, graphic arts
- Notable work: Church Window, Another August, Summer's Reflection
- Movement: American realism, Magic realism
- Patrons: Malcolm Forbes, William Schuman

Carroll Nathaniel Jones III (July 2, 1944 – June 22, 2017) was an artist in the style of American realism. Carroll grew up in New Providence, New Jersey, where his father, an illustrator for Life (magazine), was his first art teacher. He taught Carroll techniques of the Old Masters, who emphasized light, perspective, and composition. Carroll went to school in New York City (NYC) and enrolled in the Phoenix School of Design at age 17. He later attended Hartford Art School and became a commissioned portraitist for 10 years. After his work, Church Window was recognized in the New York Times, he moved away from portraits to recreate scenes that sparked memories of his childhood. Andrew Wyeth and Edward Hopper most influenced Jones. The Coe-Kerr Gallery of NYC and Whistler's Daughter Gallery of New Jersey represented Jones and contemporaries, Wyeth and Hopper. Malcolm Forbes, Frederick R. Koch, Stephen Sondheim, William Schuman, and Jean Shepherd held private collections. He exhibited at Newark Museum and Trenton Art Museum in New Jersey, and in universities, galleries and museums in seven states by his mid-thirties. His work is part of the permanent collections of Seton Hall University and Newark Museum. Art critic Marion Filler considered his work Magic realism, a quiet movement made famous in America beginning in the 1920s by Hopper, and related to Surrealism.

== Biography ==
=== Early life and education ===
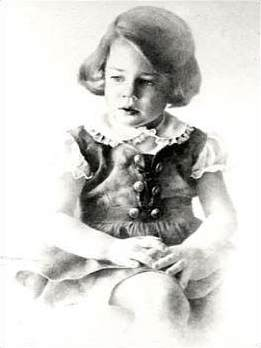
Portrait Of A Little Girl by Carroll Jones III (1968)--First commissioned portrait

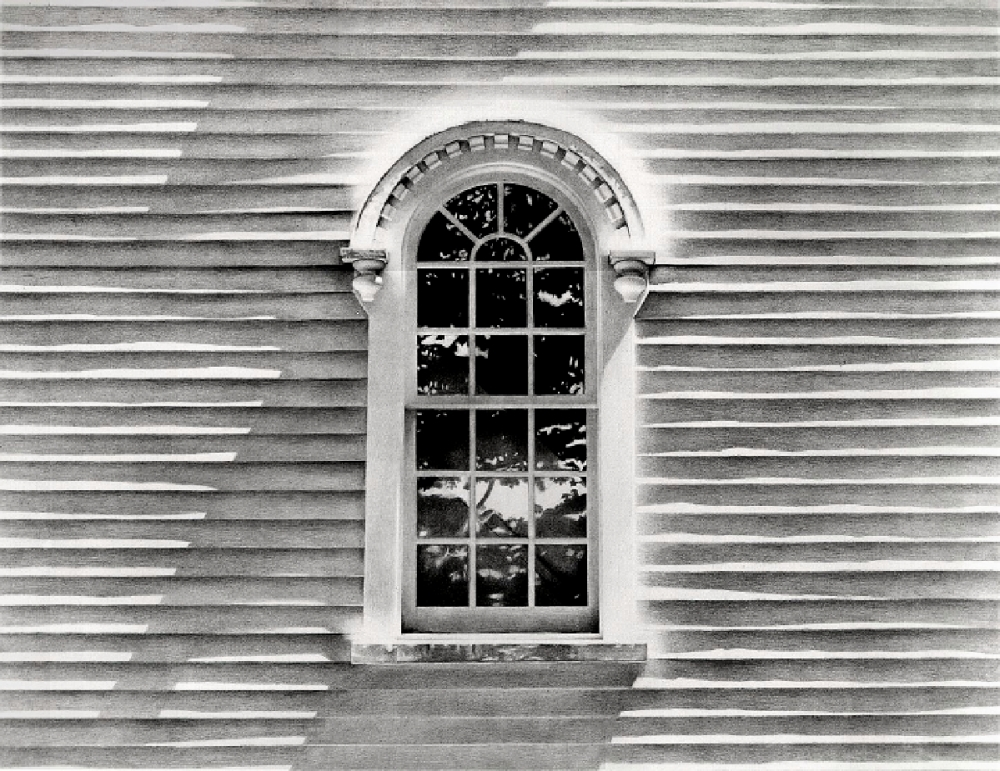
Church Window by Carroll Jones III (1975) First significant work post-portrait period.

Carroll Jones III was born on July 2, 1944, in Palm Springs, California, at Torney General Hospital. Lucy Peck Jones, nee Barnes and Carroll Nathaniel Jones Jr. lived in the former El Mirador Hotel, taken over by the army in WWII. His father was a second lieutenant in the Army Medical Corp and was stationed there as the hospital art director assigned to surgery. The elder Jones worked in Medical illustration for the Army during World War II, and later an illustrator for Life magazine and the Saturday Evening Post. His mother was the daughter of Blakeslee Barnes IV, a NYC chemical engineer and inventor. His parents met at the Yale School of Art in NYC. Jones' childhood was spent in New Providence, New Jersey, along with his younger sister, Jocelyn. His summers he spent in New Hampshire to be with his Welsh grandfather, Carroll Jones, who deeply influenced his love of the natural. Jones makes this bonding that took place with the land and people of New Hampshire apparent in the self-quote he uses to explain his work, Simple Gifts:

"Fortunately, at some point in my childhood, I began to gain an appreciation for the simpler belongings of life. I think now, a field trip to the McCarter Theater in Princeton, New Jersey, when I was 16, helped crystallize all the things I held so dear to my heart; that is, today, the core of my artistic sensibilities. The play was Our Town, which takes place in the fictitious town of Grover's Corners, New Hampshire, a town not unlike the one where I spent so much of my early years. The fictional town, and West Swanzey, New Hampshire, the actual town, were both in the shadow of Mount Monadnock, an old gentle mountain that I have climbed many times. The soul of both towns, to me, is the essential spirituality behind all the images I have painted. It just can't help but be."

Carroll learned his disciplined approach to art from his father, Carroll N. Jones Jr. He taught young Carroll the ways of the masters from the 16th century Renaissance in theories of light, shade, perspective, color, and composition. Carroll Jones III attended the Phoenix School of Design in NYC, and the Hartford Art School in West Hartford, Connecticut. Following his education, he supported himself for ten years doing commissioned penciled portraits, capturing the sensitive details of his subjects. The Chatham Press described him in 1976, shortly before a change to the architectural drawings and oil paintings he came to be known for: "In a time when the discord of the avant-garde seems to prevail, Carroll, an artist of exacting self criticism, has resigned himself to defend a refined conception of beauty. His work is quiet and reflective and invites introspection. His style is his own..."

=== The established artist ===
Carroll moved to Hoboken, New Jersey, to establish himself as an artist in 1977, and no longer drew portraits, moving from graphite drawings to concentrate on oil paintings. His first major show was among 121 New Jersey Artists at the Newark Museum and his work, Church Window, was singled out in an article from the New York Times in 1977. Within a year he held a solo show at the Newark Museum. By 1980, with over 300 pieces of work, Jones' work was represented in universities, galleries and collections in seven states, including the Forbes Collection. Coe Kerr Gallery of NYC represented him and his work, as well as American Realist Andrew Wyeth. He was a part of American Painters--Realists to Abstraction shows at Whistler's Daughter Art Gallery in Basking Ridge, New Jersey, in 1984. He received recognition with artists Norman Rockwell and Andrew Wyeth in Douglas Albert Gallery's show of The School of American Realism in 1987. Carroll began his gallery after moving to Jersey City in 1992. His studio has been there ever since.

As the artist has grown older, Jones seldom travels for his work. He no longer takes trips to Vermont to take pictures of old time storefronts that are quickly disappearing. He doesn't like to paint modern buildings, or the picturesque Manhattan skyline he can view across the Hudson. He likes to look at New York, but he doesn't want to paint it, as he told reporter Ray Smith of the Hudson Reporter. Instead, as Marion Filler, art critic of the Daily Record (Morristown) of Morris County, New Jersey has described, he has chosen to be the "keeper of time's flame...his manipulation of light on the remaining old facades of the early 20th century Hudson County has become a trademark."

=== Artistic style and influences ===
Jones' father, grandfather, uncle, and great uncle on his father's side were artists. Carroll names the contemporary realist painter Edward Hopper as one of his major influences because he had loved seeing the Hoboken storefronts riding the trains and buses home from school in NYC as a child. Hopper painted similar storefronts, and other common features of everyday life.

Art critic David L. Shirey of the New York Times noted Jones' first major work, Church Window at a juried art show at the Newark Museum "beautifully balanced composition of subtle dark and light tonalities."

"He tends to use a dark palette, defining by light instead of lines, and uses detail to draw the observer in. Not surprisingly, underlying each depiction of reality there appears to be a sense of Surrealism." wrote Amy Roestostovsky of the Daily Caller of Pennsylvania State University.

Marion Filler wrote the introduction to Jones' catalog, Jones III, published in 2013. She uses the words Magic realism, which refer to a style begun in America by Hopper in the 1920s.

"No matter the subject, the quality remains first rate.Jones did gorgeous things with graphite. The requisite realism that was so necessary for capturing a likeness was extended and developed into an ethereal, magic realism that focused on selective parts of an architectural composition.His drawing seems to carve objects out of light and dark, bringing them out of the whiteness of the page with startling authenticity then allowing them to mysteriously dissolve into the void."

Paul Froiland, editor of Midwest Art magazine, in his pictorial essay of Jones' work used the artist's own words to show his intentions, his desire to reach the common man:

"Years ago, a young black man who looked at his painting Another August said, “It looks just like a candy store I used to go to as a child in upper New York. I can feel the place, that's the exact same door that I walked through.” Jones notes, “And then I felt like I was a success. I felt that's who I want to reach, that's exactly what I am about.”

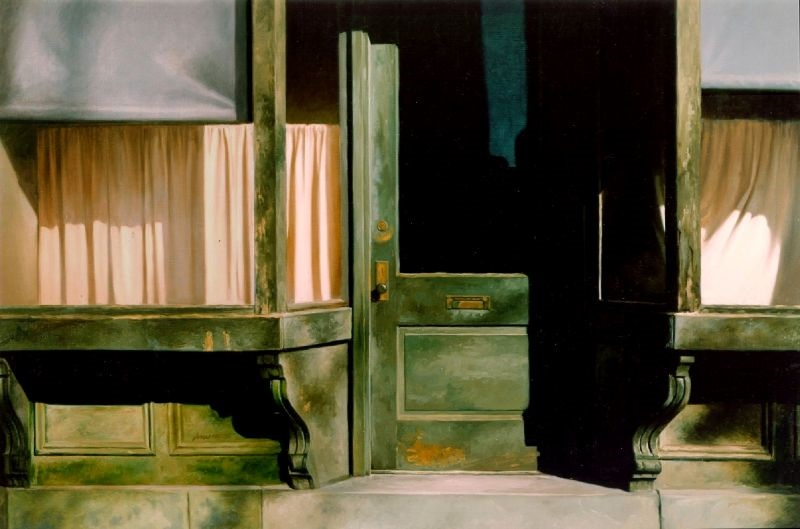
Another August by Carroll Jones III

== Notable clients and patrons ==
As a young artist, William Schuman, composer and President Emeritus of the Lincoln Center for the Performing Arts and Juilliard School of Music endorsed Jones thus: "Carroll N. Jones III is a master craftsman, whose technical skills enable him to achieve his idealized vision of common objects." John S. Chalsty, Chairman of the New York City Economic Development Corporation felt "fortunate to own a number of Carroll N. Jones III drawings and paintings, and consider him one of the countries finest young artists." The New York Foundation for the Arts recognized Jones with a $25,000 grant. The Boston Museum of Fine Arts, the Frick Collection, and the Hoboken Museum represent his work in their archives. The collections at Seton Hall at the Walsh Gallery in South Orange, New Jersey, and the Newark Museum contain his works. Private collections of Jones' work include those of Stephen Sondheim, Frederick Koch, and humorist Jean Shepherd. Malcolm Forbes, Henry Kissinger, and Al Pacino have commissioned paintings.

== Death ==
Carroll Jones III died on June 22, 2017, at the age of 72 in Jersey City, New Jersey.

== Legacy ==
Praise for Carroll Jones III comes from former students who went on to have outstanding careers in Portraiture, Illustration, and Architectural drawing. Daniel Mark Duffy, whose works are a part of the permanent collection of the National Portrait Gallery (United States) referred to Jones as an "American Realist and Master Draftsman". When American Art Award-winning illustrator Vince Natale first saw Jones' work, he was still in high school. Natale said he "would do anything to learn how" to do what Jones did, and became his student. Michael H. Richmond shows Jones' influence in detailed drawings of portions of historic Charleston, South Carolina architecture that recognized in nationally juried shows.

== Gallery ==
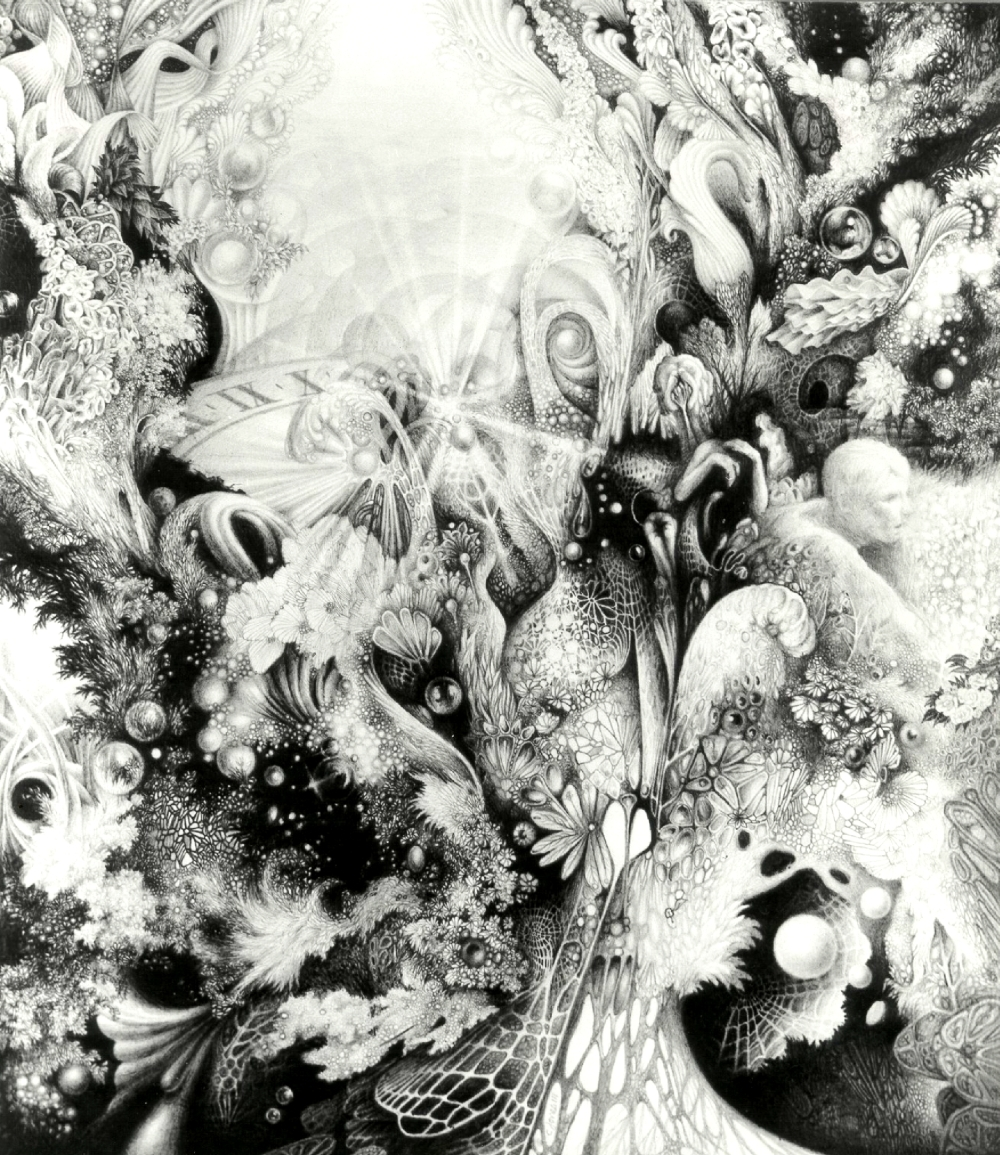
The Dream by Carroll Jones III --(1962)--age 18 years.

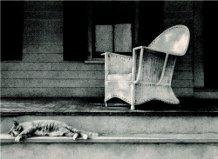
Waiting for Grandfather by Carroll Jones III (1967)

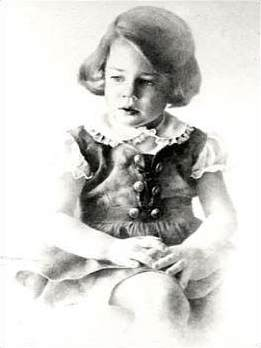
Portrait Of A Little Girl by Carroll Jones III (1968)--First commissioned portrait

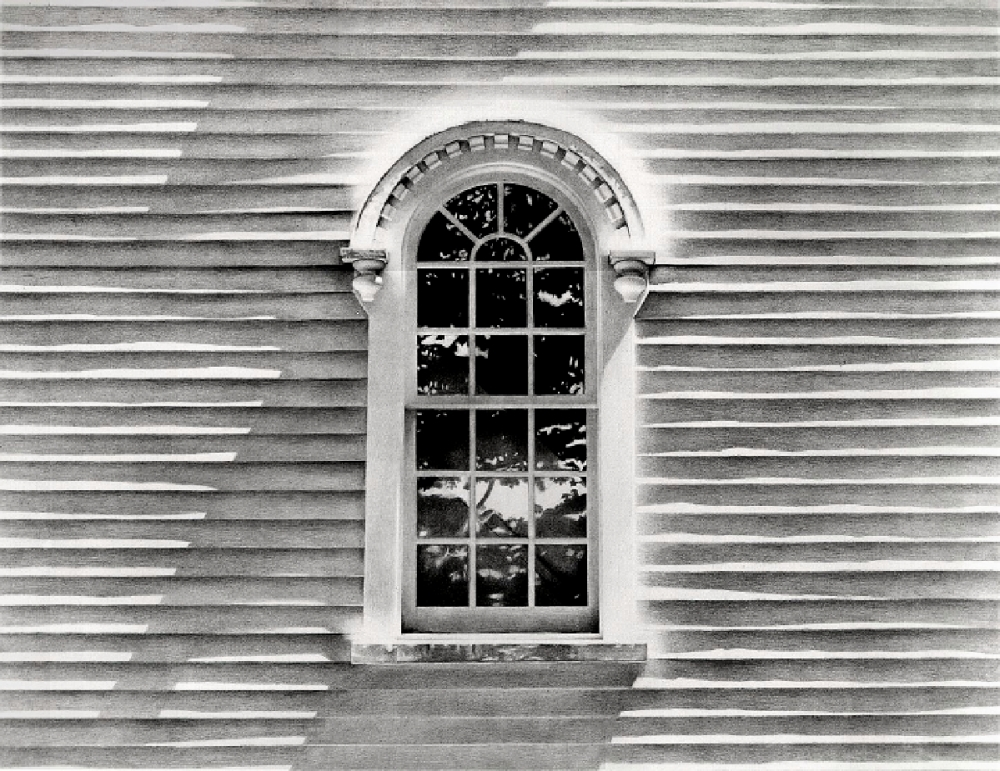
Church Window by Carroll Jones III (1975) First major work post-portrait period.

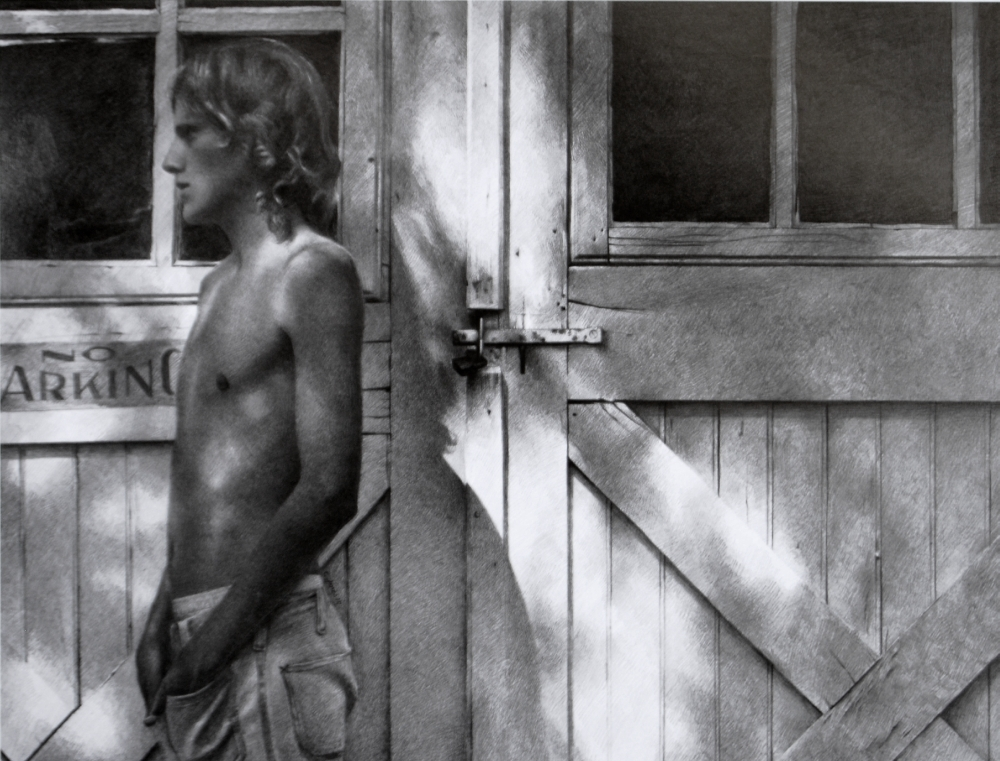
Leaving Home by Carroll N. Jones III (1976)

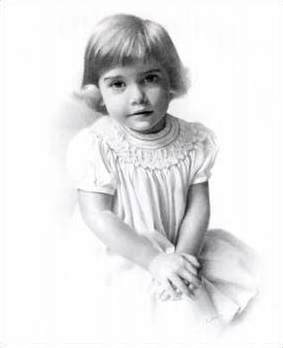
Portrait Of Ann by Carroll Jones III (Late '70's, early '80's)

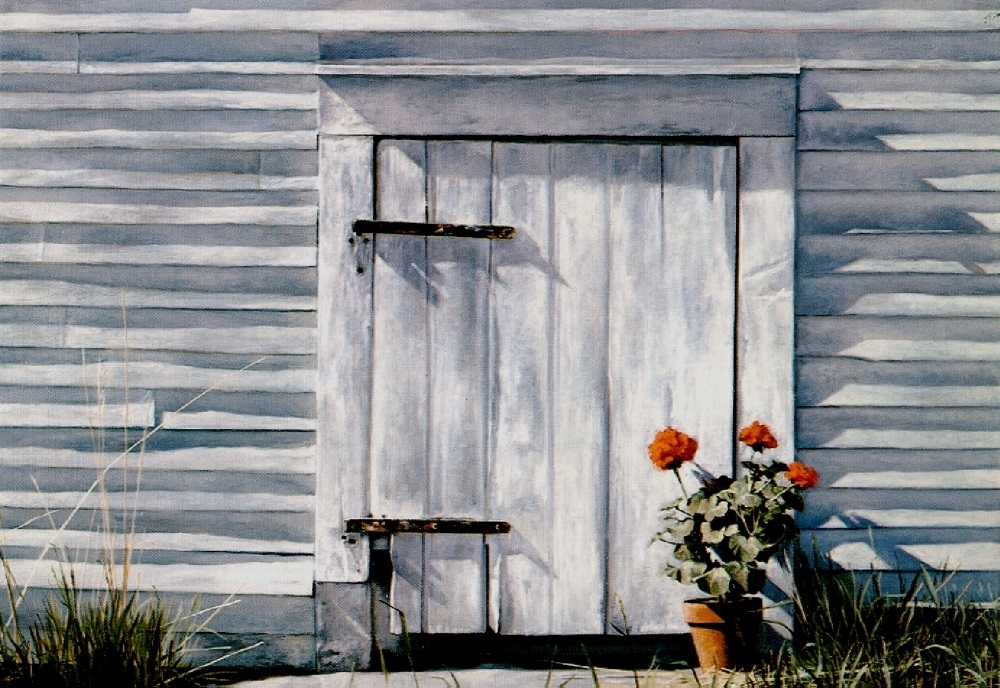
Summer's End (~1980)

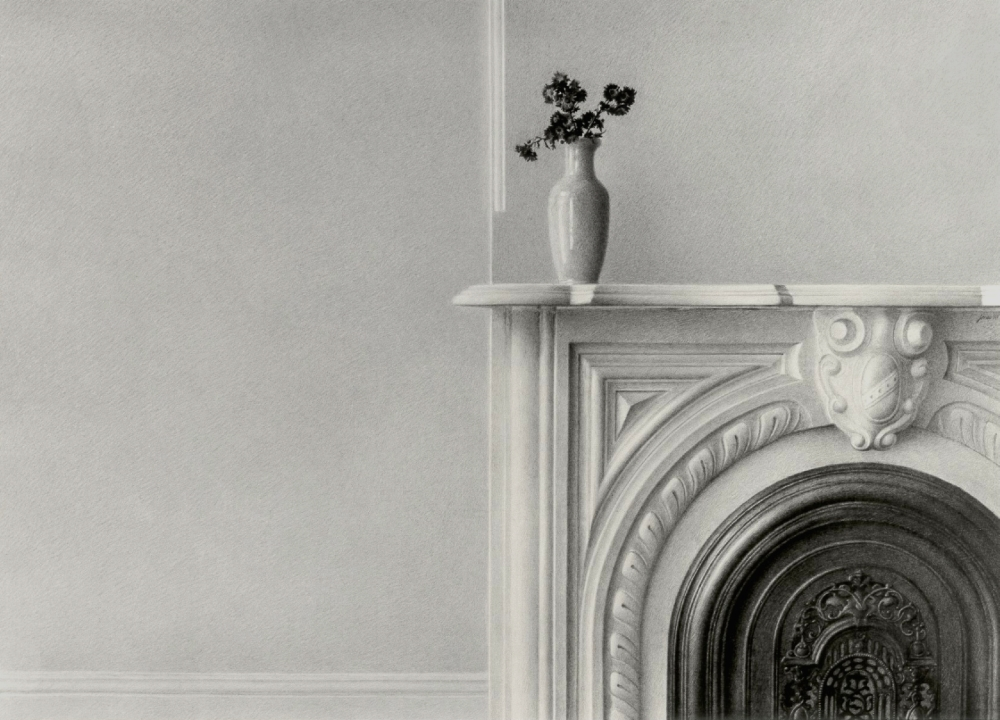
Hoboken Still Life by Carroll Jones III (1983)

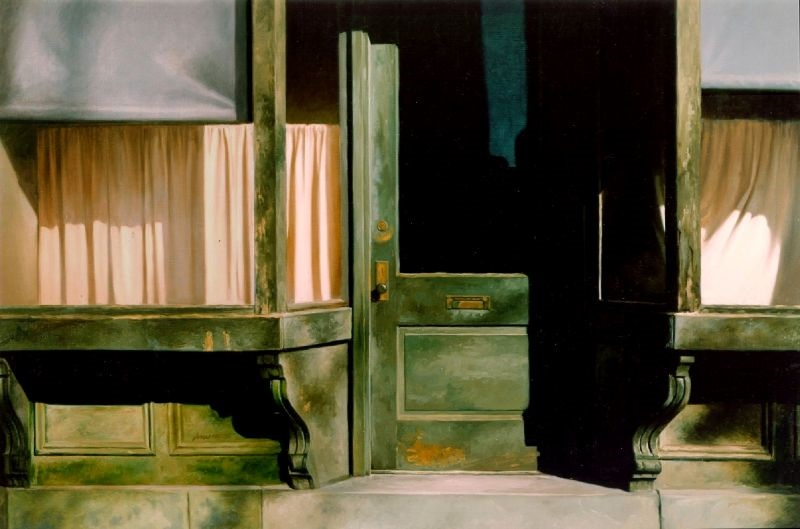
Another August by Carroll Jones III (1983)

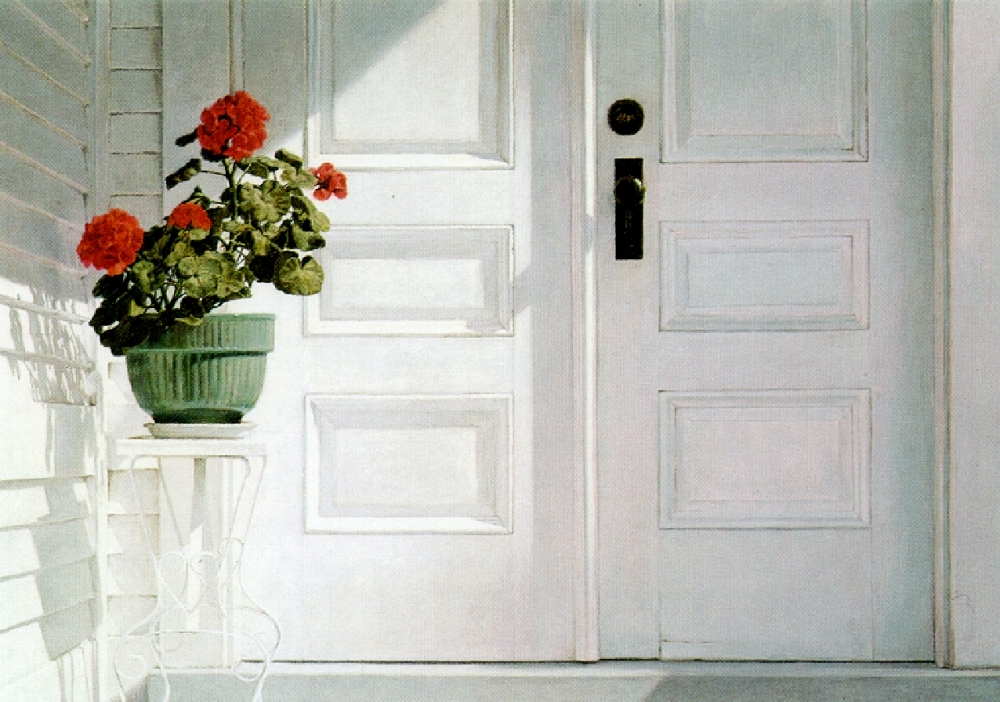
Midsummer Sun by Carroll Jones III (1985)

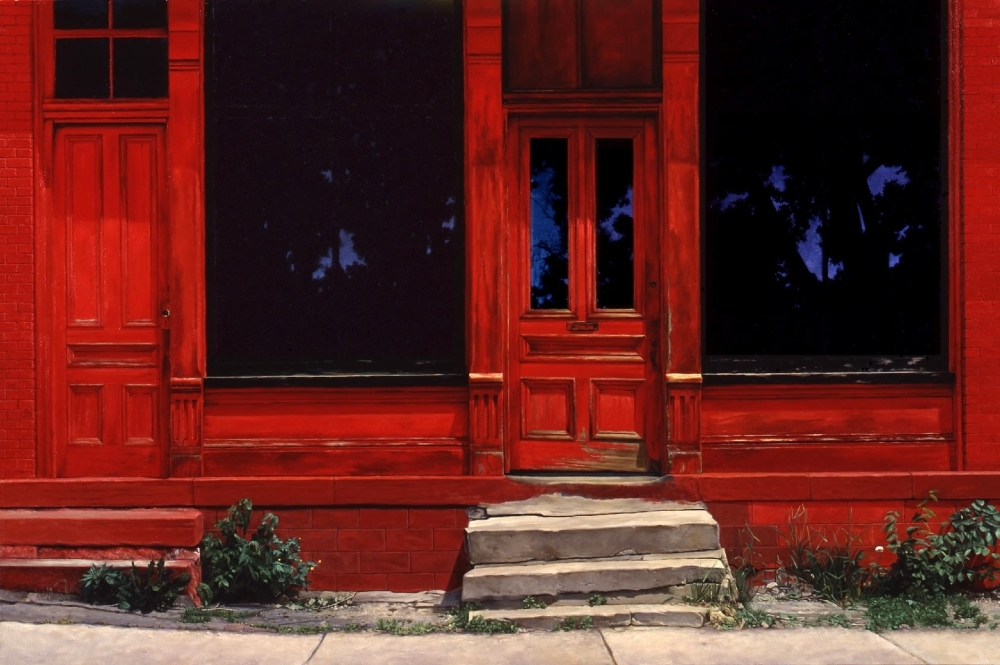
Separate Skies by Carroll N. Jones III (1988)

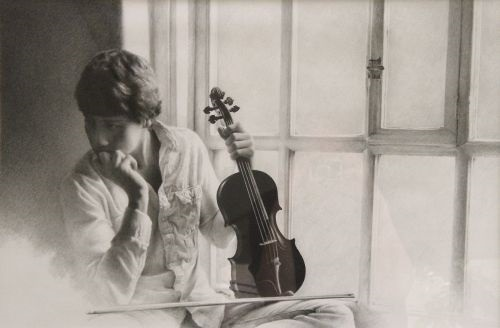
Young Man With A Violin by Carroll Jones III *

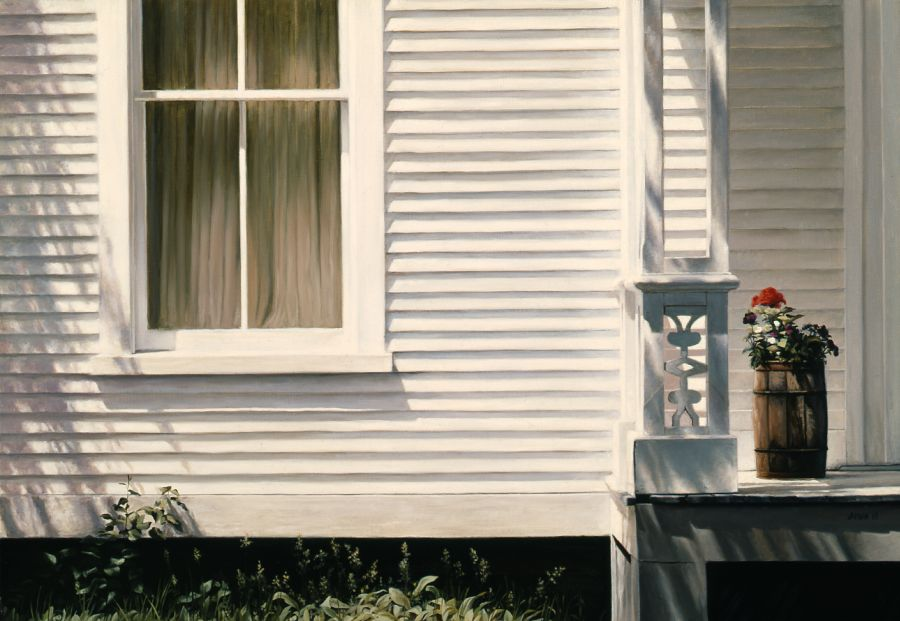
American Scene by Carroll Jones III *

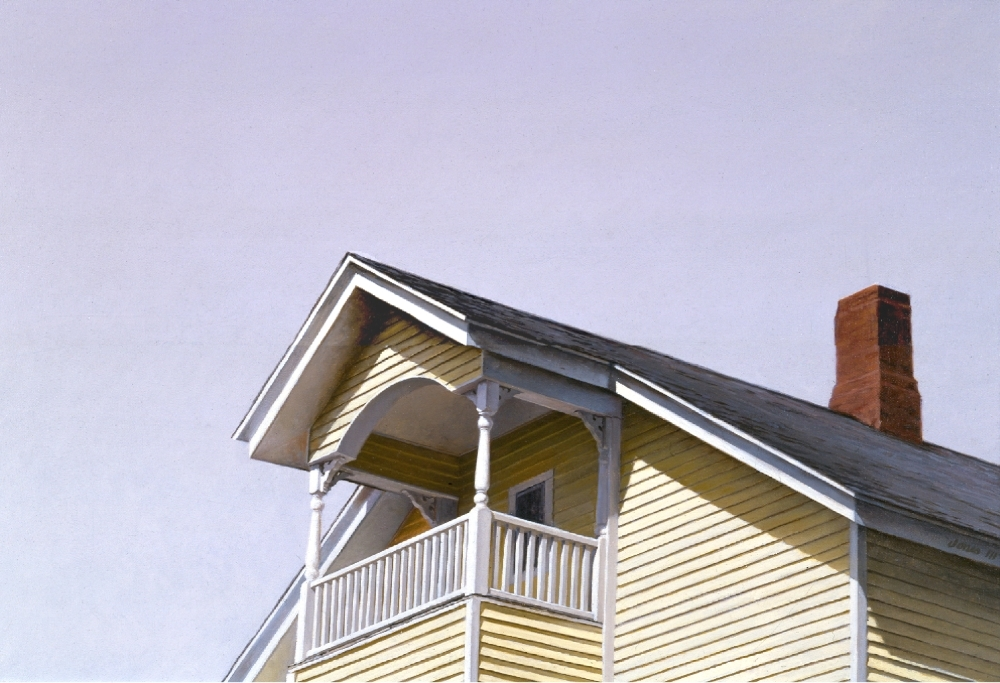
House By The Sea by Carroll Jones III *

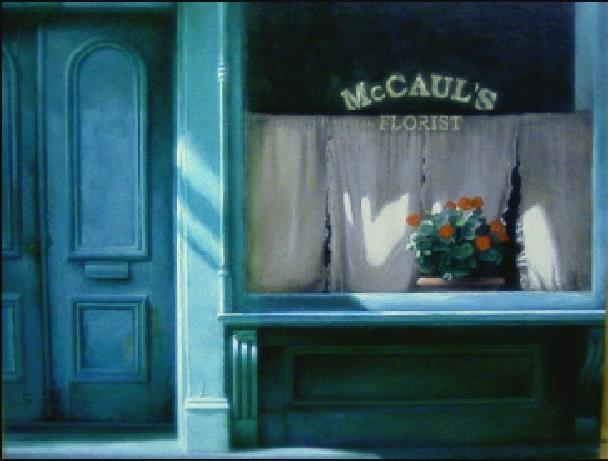
McCaul's Florist (2004) By Carroll N. Jones III (2004)

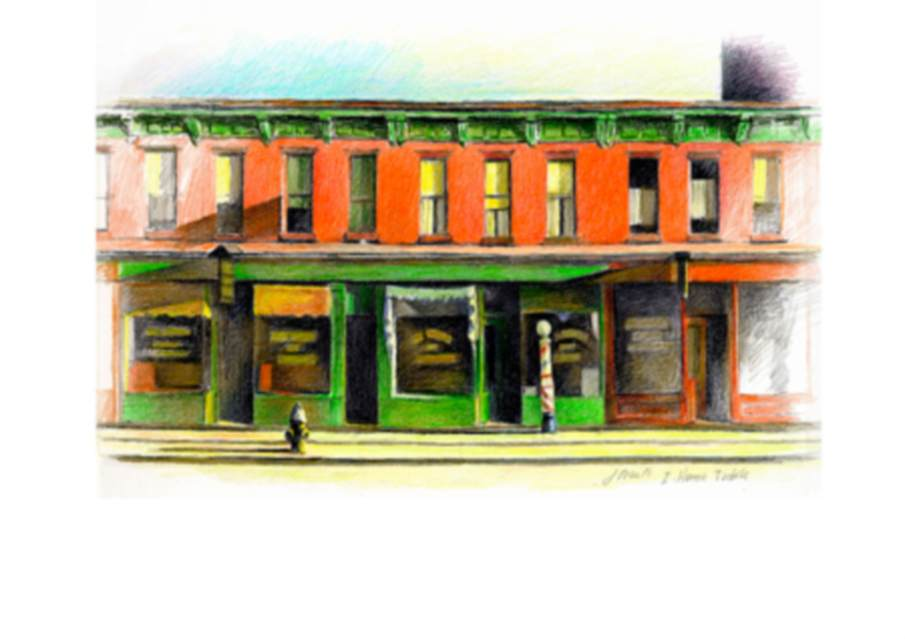
Hopper Tribute by Carroll N. Jones III (2005)

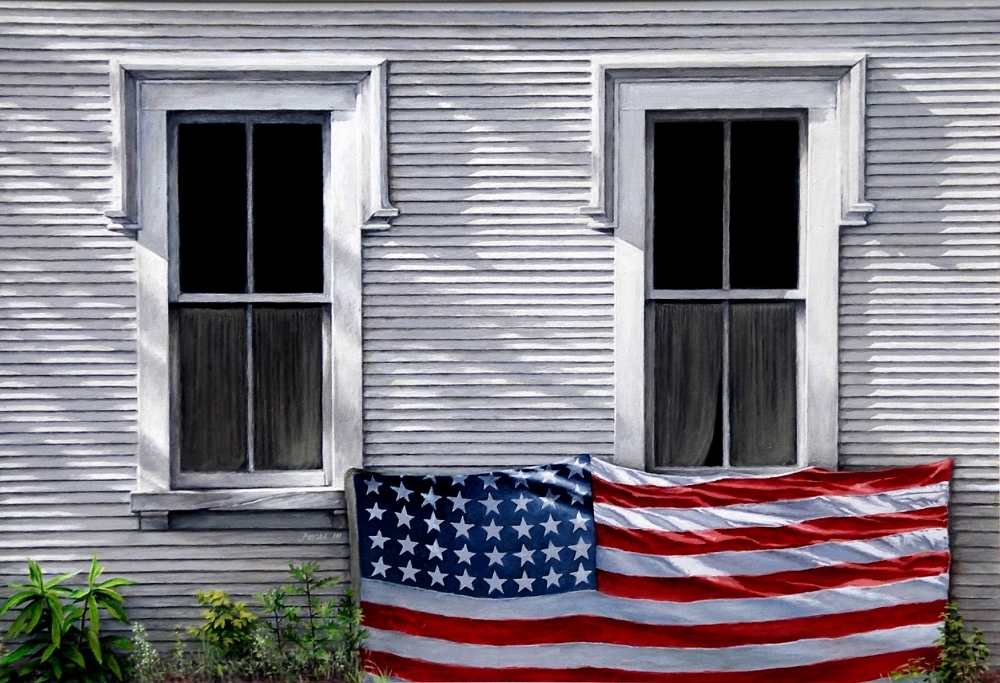
The Tenderland by Carroll Jones III (2006)

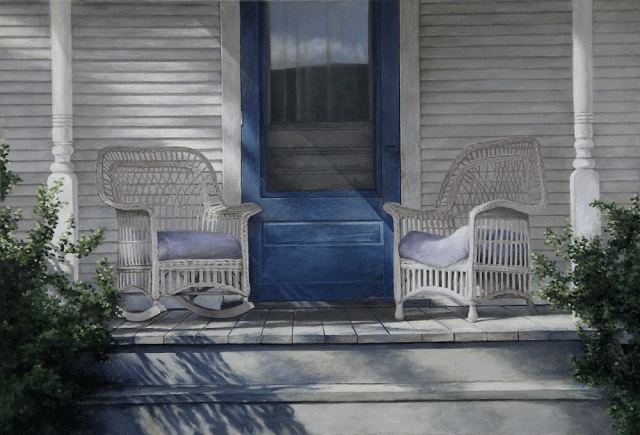
Home by Carroll Jones III (2007)

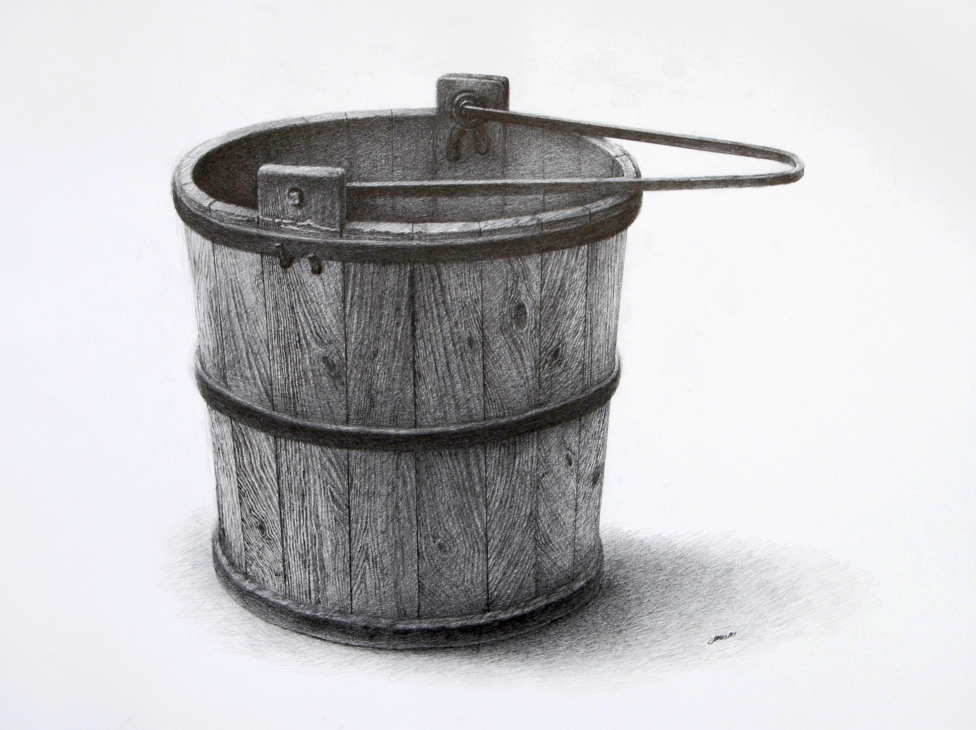
The Water Bucket by Carroll Jones III (2012)

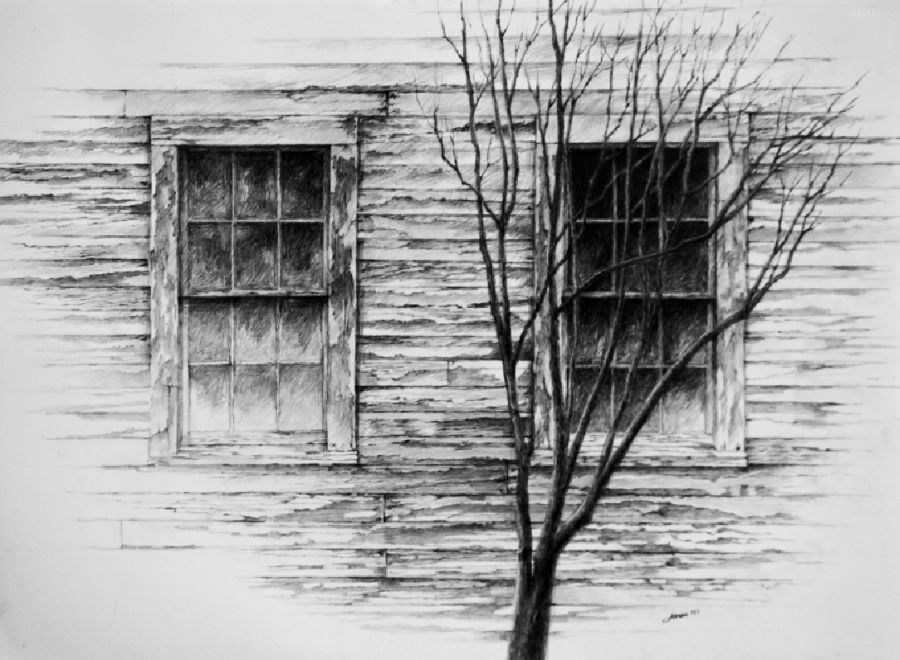
Winter by Carroll Jones III (2014)

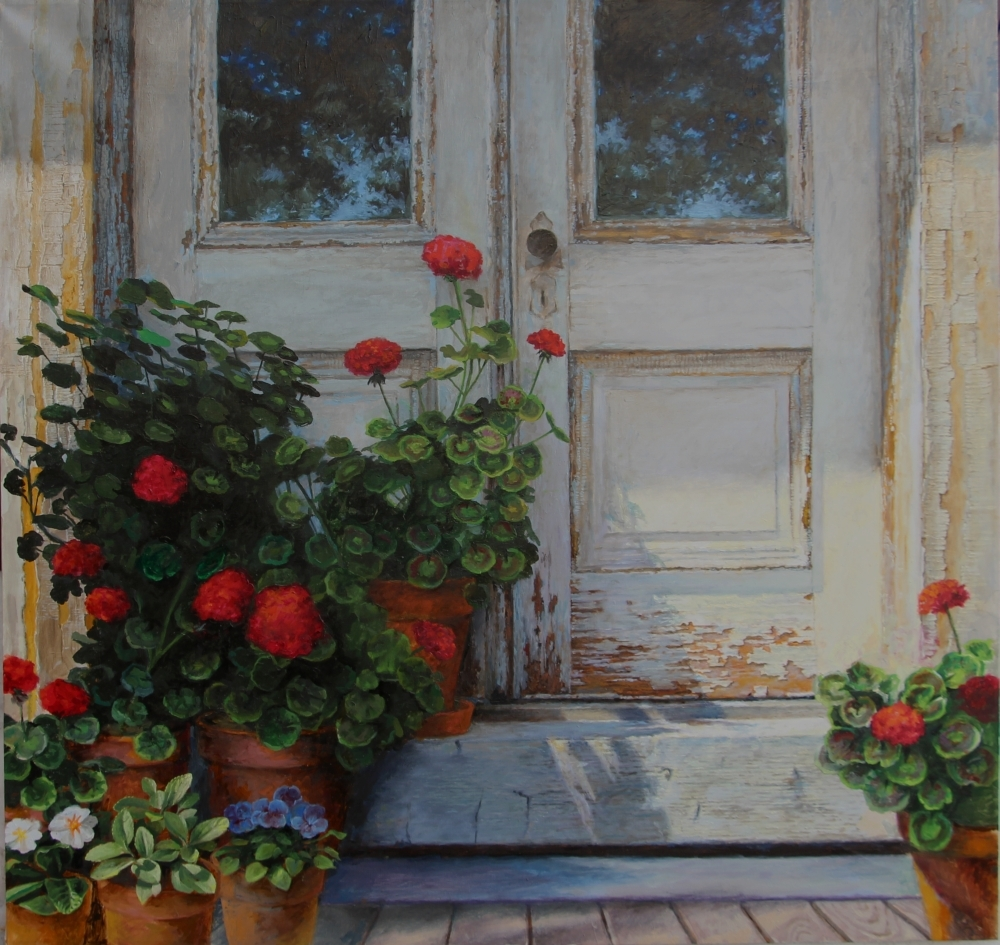
Vermont Afternoon by Carroll N. Jones III (2014)

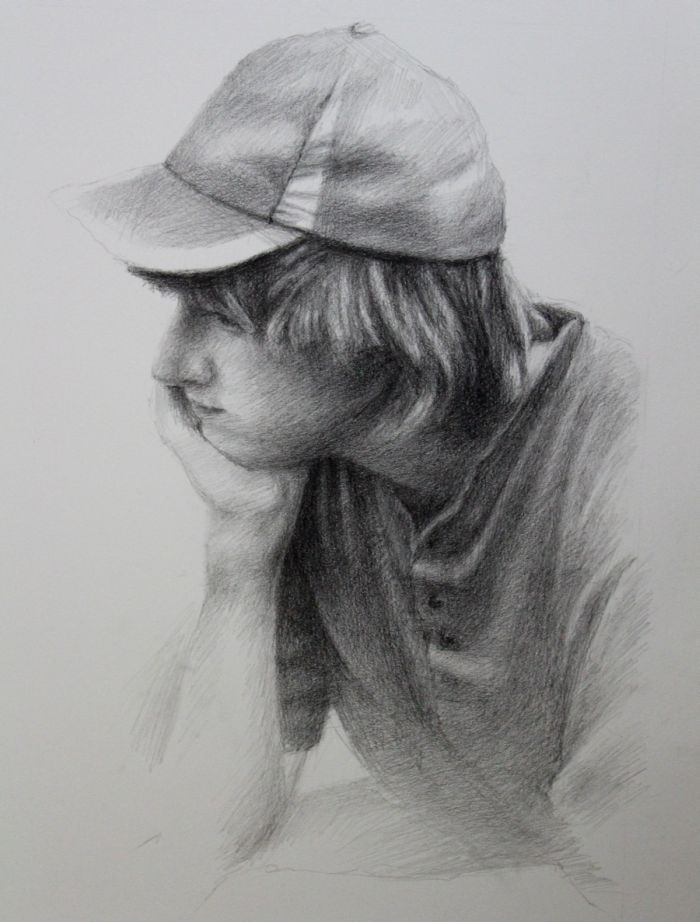
Ben Walker's Portrait by Carroll N. Jones III (2014)

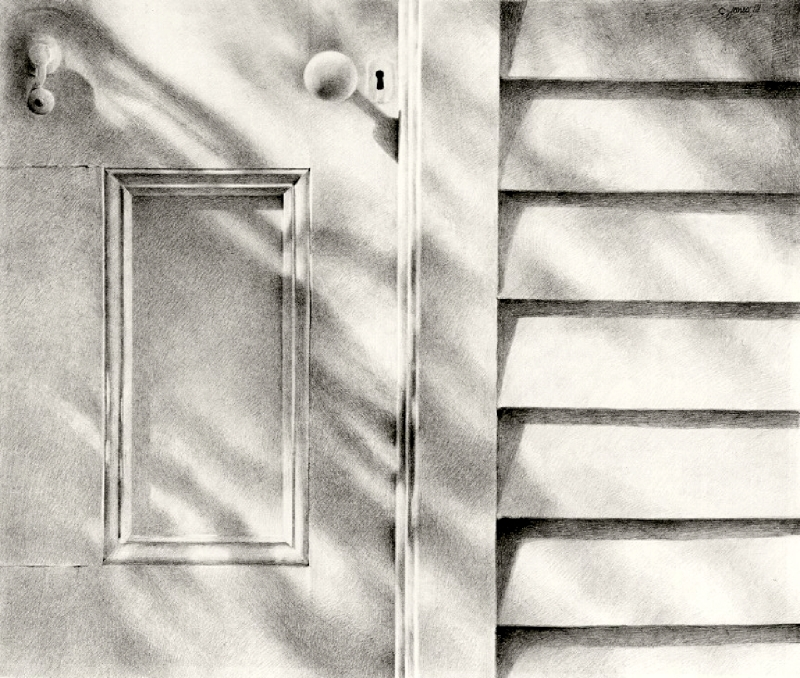
October Shadows by Carroll Jones III (2015)

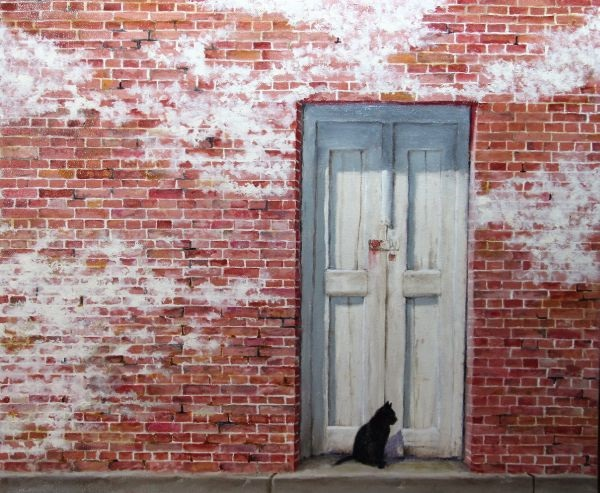
Bricks, Door and Cat by Carroll Jones III (2016)

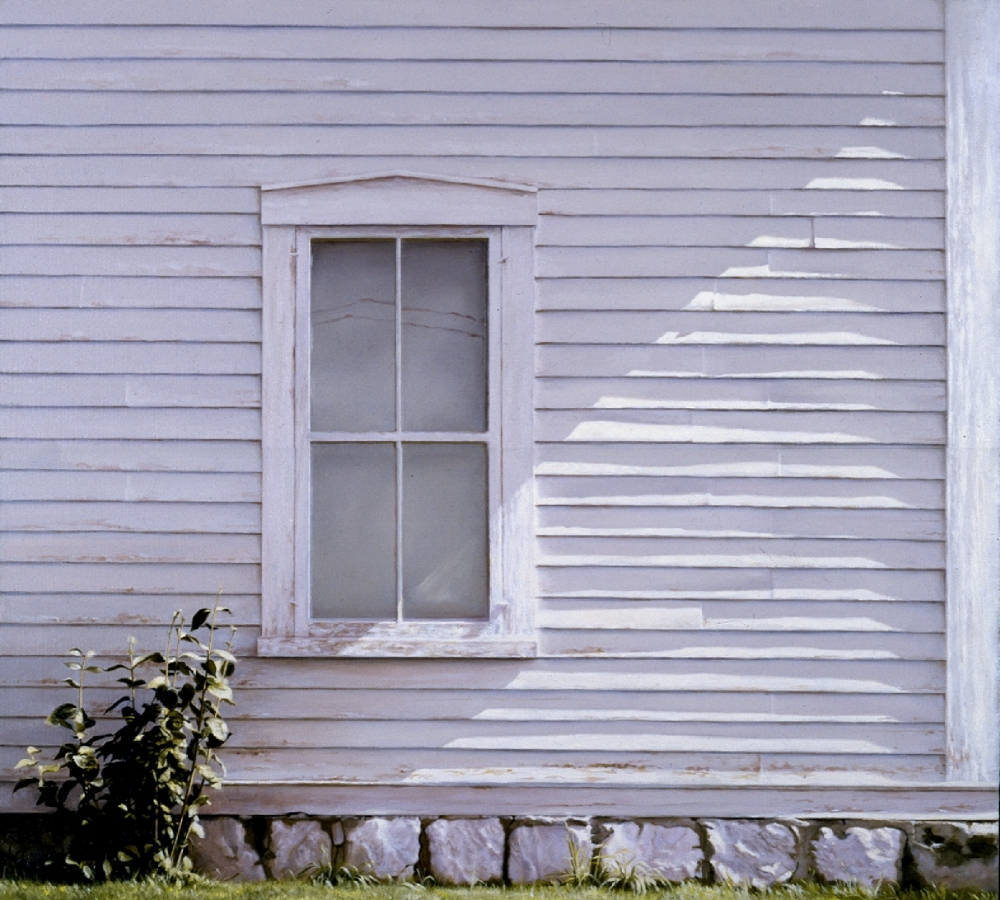
Simple Gifts by Carroll Jones III *
- date unknown at this time.
