= Carroll S. Walsh Jr. =

American judge

Carroll S. Walsh Jr. (February 18, 1921 – December 17, 2012) was an American jurist.

Born in Detroit, Michigan, Walsh served in the United States Army during World War II. He went to St. Lawrence University and University of Notre Dame and graduated from Albany Law School. He served as a New York state court judge in Fulton County, New York and from 1978 to 1990 served on the New York Supreme Court.

Walsh and other American soldiers liberated 2,500 Jewish concentration camp prisoners from a Nazi train at the end of World War II. Walsh and his tank crew had been operating in advance of their support column and came over a ridge overlooking the train. Their appearance and presence caused the SS troops guarding the train to retreat and abandon their positions. The name he and his crew had given to their tank was "Ding Dong Daddy". His account of liberating Holocaust victims from a Nazi train led to reunions with the survivors 60 years later.
