= Carroll C. Halterman =

American management development professional (1919–2005)

Carroll C. Halterman (1919–2005) was a national and international authority in management development. He conducted hundreds of programs as a management consultant after 1964. He was also a nationally acclaimed author and lecturer in supervisory training and executive development.

Carroll C. Halterman was born in Ohio on October 9, 1919. In 1937, after graduating with honors from Jackson High School in Jackson, Ohio, he began his undergraduate studies at the Ohio State University in Columbus, Ohio. He devoted his first two years of study at Ohio State to engineering before branching out into chemistry, English composition and literature, commerce, and economics.

In 1941, Halterman's education was temporarily interrupted when he enlisted with the U. S. Air Force during World War II. Halterman continued to serve in the Air Force after the war. From 1944 to 1946, he participated in the AAF Air Training Command Instructor's School. From 1953 to 1957, he worked in the Air Rescue Service (USAF) in Orlando, Florida, as an instructor, training officer, liaison, and logistics officer. After receiving his B.S. in political science from the University of Maryland in 1957, he worked from 1957 to 1959 with the Fourth Air Force, Hamilton Air Force Base, San Francisco, as a school official and instructor.

Following the completion of his M.A. in Policy and Administration at the University of Washington in 1961, he worked for the Air Force as a Production and Procurement Staff Officer in Seattle, Washington from 1961 to 1964. While working on his PhD in policy and administration at the University of Washington, which he completed in 1965, Halterman also worked as a teaching associate in business statistics. In 1965, Halterman was appointed assistant professor of Management and Public Administration at the University of Denver. He was promoted to a full professor in 1972.

As a professor in the College of Business, he specialized in management development center operation, corporate forecasting and planning, individual objective setting, the analysis of operations, and management and supervisory training. Halterman was also a member of the National Society for Performance and Instruction, the International Consultants Foundation, the Academy of Management, the CHexchange, and the National University Continuing Education Association. He and his wife Harriet had four children. Halterman died in 2005.
