= Robert C. Hahn =

American politician

Robert Hahn
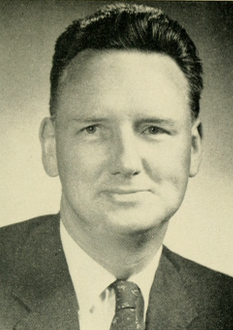

Member of the Massachusetts House of Representatives from the 5th Norfolk District
- In office 1961–1965
- Preceded by: Russell Hayden
- Succeeded by: Ralph Cartwright

Personal details
- Born: March 25, 1921 Jamaica Plain, Boston, Massachusetts
- Died: June 4, 1996 (aged 75)
- Party: Republican
- Education: Northeastern University; Boston University School of Law; Tufts University
- Occupation: Lawyer; Politician

Robert Conrad Hahn (1921-1996) was an American lawyer and politician who was a member of the Massachusetts House of Representatives from 1961 to 1965 and Chairman of the Massachusetts Republican State Committee from 1971 to 1972.

Hahn represented the 5th Norfolk District in the Massachusetts House of Representatives from 1961 to 1965. In 1964 he was the Republican nominee for Treasurer and Receiver-General of Massachusetts. He ran for Massachusetts Attorney General in 1966, but dropped out of the race before the Republican primary.

Hahn was elected Chairman of the Republican State Committee on November 22, 1971. He lost his chairmanship on May 25, 1972, amid allegations that he was being investigated by the State Attorney General's office for fraud.

Hahn was indicted on June 16, 1972, on the charge of conspiracy to commit larceny. He was acquitted by a jury and later sued former Governor Francis W. Sargent, former Attorney General Robert H. Quinn, former State Insurance Commissioner John G. Ryan, and former Secretary of Consumer Affairs William Cowin. Hahn alleged that the defendants had violated his rights under the Civil Rights Act of 1871 when they "perjured themselves, suborned perjury, suppressed evidence and manipulated administrative processes in an effort to destroy appellant's political career by generating adverse publicity and procuring his indictment." Three of the charges were dismissed and a summary judgment in favor of the defendants was issued on the fourth.

Party political offices
Preceded by Joseph B. Grossman	Republican nominee for Treasurer and Receiver-General of Massachusetts; 1964	Succeeded by Joseph Fernandes
Preceded by Herbert Waite	Chairman of the Massachusetts Republican State Committee; 1971-1972	Succeeded by Otto Wahlrab
