= Carroll Snow Wales =

Carroll F. Wales (September 15, 1917 – May 6, 2007) was an art restorer and conservator of paintings, icons, frescoes, and murals. He specialized in the conservation of early Christian Byzantine art and worked on restoration projects in the Middle East, Europe and the United States. A fine arts major at Harvard College, he received an art conservation degree from the Fogg Art Museum. Wales graduated in 1949 and went on to restore important mosaics and frescoes at prominent museums and religious sites around the world. In addition to these projects, he became co-proprietor with Constantine Tsaousis of Oliver Brothers, an art restoration firm in Boston, Massachusetts.

== Notable restoration projects ==
Carroll Wales has restored and conserved numerous artworks by some of the world's most famous artists, including Annibale Carracci, John Singleton Copley, Francisco Goya, Giovanni Paolo Panini, Gilbert Stuart, Rembrandt Van Rijn and others.

From 1957 to 1959, Wales accompanied archaeologist Max Mallowan and his wife, Agatha Christie, to Nimrud, Iraq to work on conservation of ivories. During this time, he also worked with the Byzantine Institute, an organization whose mission was excavating and restoring mosaics, icons, and frescoes in the Middle East. Wales worked at the Kariye Camii and in the Hagia Sophia in Istanbul, Turkey. During this time, Wales also assembled one of the most comprehensive Byzantine coin collections in the world.

In 1960, Wales joined an expedition to do restoration work in the Monastery of St. Catherine in Mt. Sinai, Egypt, and in the following years made several trips to work on Icons at monasteries on Mount Athos, in Greece.

After the devastating flooding in Italy in 1963, Wales helped save damaged artwork in Florence. He joined an international group of art restorers in 1966, to help save priceless works of art damaged during floods in Florence, Italy. Later, he did restoration work on the Spanish medieval art collection of the Deering family in Tarragona, Spain and in the United States.

In 1977, Wales worked on murals by Arshile Gorky, an artist New York (magazine) described as one of the "founders of postwar New York abstract painting." He spent over a year restoring the wall murals from the Newark Airport, which had been painted over with fifteen coats of wall enamel. The murals now hang in the Newark Museum.

== Notable Collections ==
Early Christian Objects - a collection of jewelry, sculpture, bronzes, pottery, and fine oil lamps. The most important part of the collection is its bronze enkolpias-early pendants expressing Orthodox Christian faith.

Byzantine coin collection - one of the most comprehensive collections of its kind, consisting of many important gold and silver coins. The highlight of the collection is its more than 5,000 bronze pieces.
