= J. Carroll Payne =

American lawyer

John Carroll Payne (September 24, 1855 in Warrenton, Virginia – February 18, 1936 in Miami, Florida) was an American lawyer, banker, philanthropist, and patron of the arts.

== Early life and education ==
Payne was born in 1855 in Warrenton, Virginia, to Rice W. and Ann America Semmes Payne. He attended Georgetown University, the University of Virginia and the University of Louisiana at New Orleans; graduating from the University of Virginia in 1877.

== Career ==
In New Orleans, Payne joined the law office of his uncle, T.J. Semmes. He later moved to Atlanta, so as to avoid having to ask his wife to leave her hometown and family behind. Another factor in this decision was that his wife did not like the climate of New Orleans. He later became a partner in the Atlanta law firm Payne and Tye. He also helped submit a proposal for the chartering of the Druid Hills Golf Club, which was granted in 1912. On March 1, 1924, he was elected president of the Southern States Art League, and served as the president of the Atlanta Art Association from 1926 to 1927.

== Personal life ==
Payne married Helen Fairlie Hill on November 25, 1885. They had two daughters and one son. He died in Miami on February 18, 1936, at the age of 80.
