= Ronald Carroll McDonald =

American convicted child molester

- McDonald pleading guilty in November 1997
- Born: February 25, 1926
- Died: August 7, 2011 (aged 85); Bothell, Washington, U.S.
- Conviction: January 20, 1998
- Criminal charges: First-degree rape of a child (4 counts); First-degree child molestation (3 counts)
- Penalty: 26 1/2 years imprisonment

Details
- Victims: 8–45+
- Span of crimes: 1937 – October 1997

Ronald Carroll McDonald (February 25, 1926 – August 7, 2011) was an American convicted child molester known for playing Santa Claus for over 25 years before confessing to his crimes. McDonald had been a prominent figure in Lake Forest Park, Washington as a year-round Santa, who volunteered his time at least six days a week to working with children, including those in the Seattle area hospitals. When it was revealed that McDonald had been molesting children, the news gained international attention.

== Life ==
McDonald spent his teenage years in Salem, Oregon, before settling in Washington. After serving in the US Navy, he worked as a janitor at the University of Washington Medical Center from 1959 until his retirement in 1982.

It was at work, in 1967, when co-workers suggested that he take over the role of Santa for the sick children, after the regular Santa had officially retired. His wife Beryl acted as Mrs. Claus, and they would visit the patients throughout the entire year. Starting in 1982, McDonald would pose in pictures during the holiday season at the Lake Forest Park Towne Centre, where he gained much of his recognition. McDonald was described as a very popular and helpful person, which lent to the shock of his crimes. He also volunteered as a child caretaker at his former workplace at the UWMC and for the nursery of Bethany Baptist Church in Kenmore. Aside from his charity work, his community noted his soapstone carving talents and love for rhubarb pie. He was able to communicate with hearing-impaired children through sign language, and spoke Vietnamese to young refugees.

== Crimes ==
After being outed by a 6-year-old family victim, McDonald had voluntarily confessed to seven additional sex crimes, which spanned over the course of several decades. While a few acquaintances found his fondness of children a bit obsessive, most of his friends, neighbors and Lake Forest Park residents were shocked to learn of McDonald's secret life. He was thought to be kind and caring, with an excellent sense of humor. After his arrest, he expressed remorse and immediately took responsibility for his crimes. His son, Craig, mentioned that he thought his father's remorse was genuine and that he had done many great things in his life that makes his sincerity believable; McDonald's lawyer, Michael Danko, concurred that his client's life of good deeds suggests he was a good person who did bad things, and even compared him to Jekyll and Hyde.

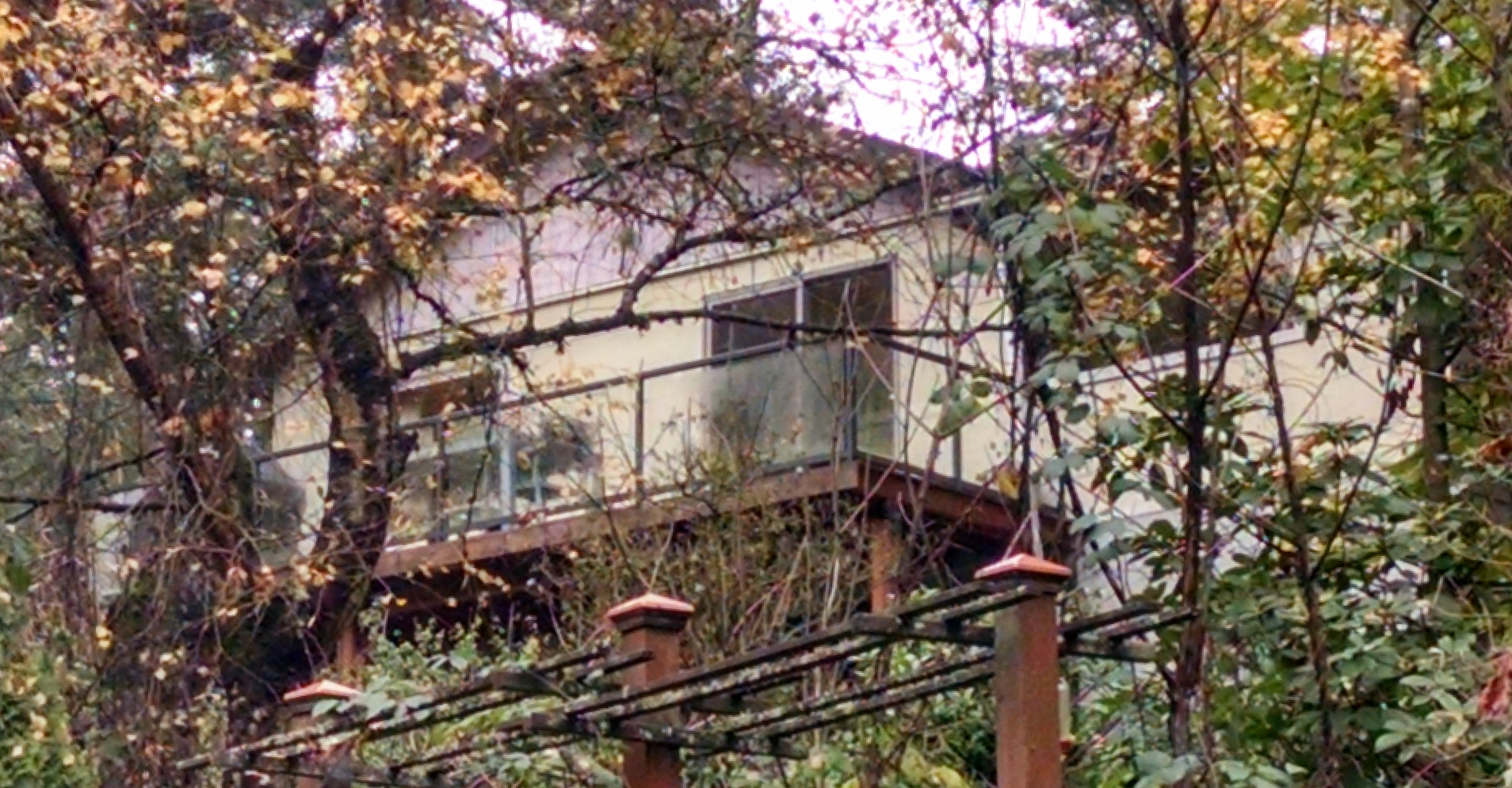
Location in which McDonald claimed all of his crimes took place

On October 29, 1997, he pleaded not guilty. Danko told the Seattle Times that the plea was just a formality and that McDonald would stand by his admission to the crimes. He ultimately pleaded guilty during sentencing on January 9, 1998.

McDonald said he would groom his child victims through his volunteer work as a babysitter at the Bethany Baptist Church of Kenmore's nursery, as well as during the Holiday season playing Santa in the shopping mall, and at UW Medical Center; but would wait to molest them until they were actually at his house.

During his conviction, both he and his family asked for the maximum possible sentence as penance for his crimes. Throughout the sentencing process, McDonald was apologetic, emotional and would openly express love for his wife. On January 9, 1998, McDonald was ultimately given the maximum sentence of the crimes he was convicted of, 26 1/2 years in confinement at the state's treatment center for sexual offenders, a location which would make McDonald available to researchers studying the causes of sexual deviancy.

Although when he was arrested McDonald initially claimed to have started molesting children in 1991, while he was held for trial he confessed to molesting at least 45 children, possibly up to 70, since 1937, but was never convicted of the crimes.

== Death ==
McDonald died on August 7, 2011, in Bothell, Washington.

== See also ==
- List of serial rapists
