= Philibert Pellegrini =

American politician (1918–2005)

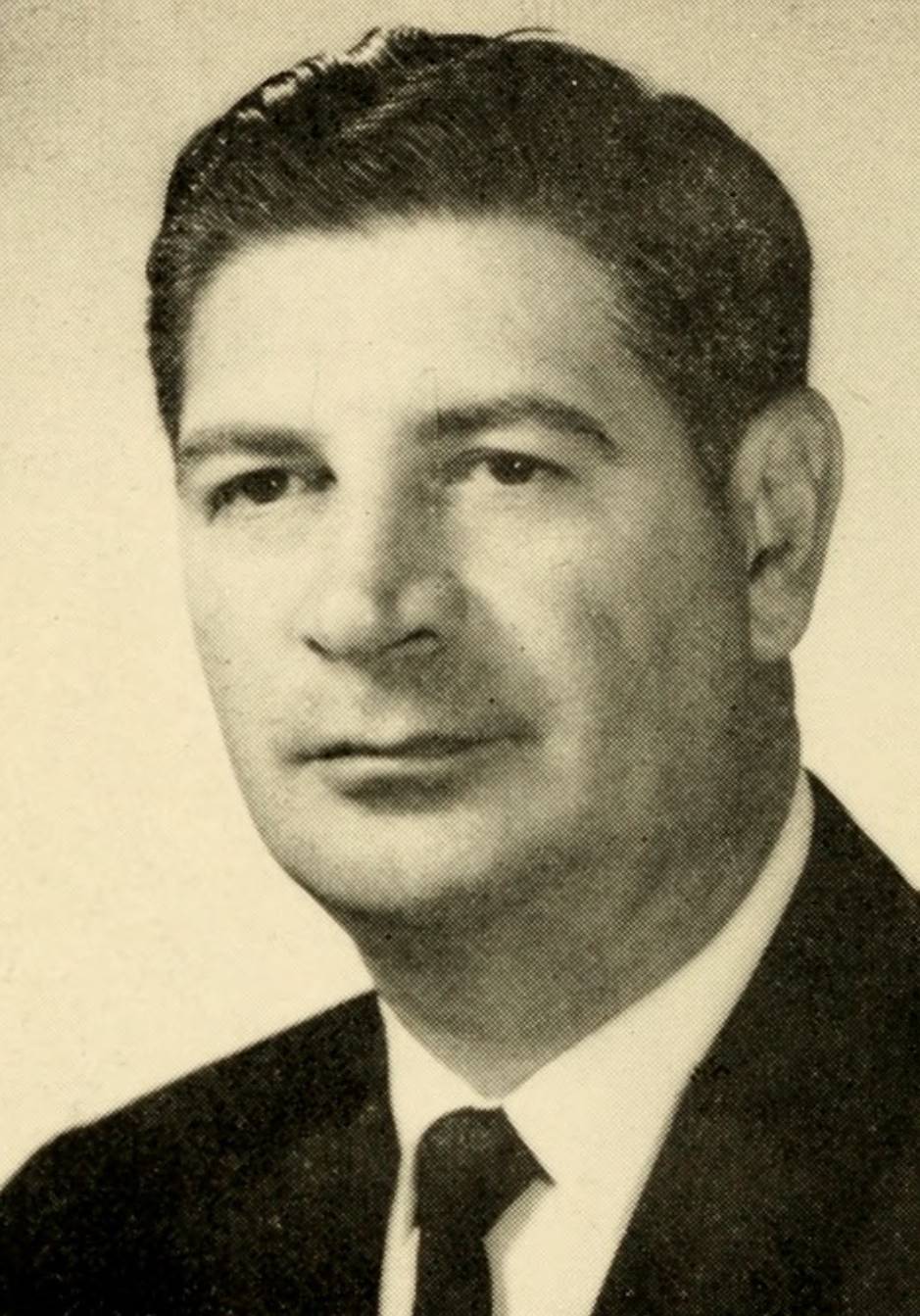
- Pellegrini, circa 1967

Member of the Massachusetts Senate from the 6th Middlesex district
- In office January 2, 1963 – July 24, 1972
- Preceded by: C. Eugene Farnam
- Succeeded by: John W. Bullock

Personal details
- Born: September 4, 1918 Somerville, Massachusetts
- Died: December 16, 2005 (aged 87) Woburn, Massachusetts
- Party: Democratic

Philibert L. Pellegrini (September 4, 1918 – December 16, 2005) was an American politician from Massachusetts. He served in the Massachusetts Senate from 1963 to 1972.

== Biography ==
Pellegrini was born on September 4, 1918, in Somerville, Massachusetts. Outside of politics, Pellegrini worked as a lawyer, and was educated at Suffolk University Law School.

Pellegrini was first elected to public office in 1961, when he became a member of the Arlington, Massachusetts Board of Selectmen, a position he held until 1964. In 1962, following the retirement of incumbent C. Eugene Farnam, Pellegrini won election to the Massachusetts Senate.

On July 24, 1972, Pellegrini was appointed as assistant to the Senate counsel. He resigned from his role as a state senator on the same day, as state law prohibited one person from holding two or more state roles at the same time. On October 28, he was appointed chief counsel to Massachusetts' Health, Welfare, and Retirement Fund Trust Board, a board responsible for private pension funds in the state.

Pellegrini died on December 16, 2005, in Woburn, Massachusetts, at the age of 87.
