= Shetland Park =

Coordinates: 42.518°N 70.889°W

Shetland Park is a 1,500,000-square-foot (140,000 m^{2}) Office & Industrial complex, on the edge of Salem Harbor in Salem, Massachusetts, USA. The Park accommodates a variety of uses including office space, flex space, R&D, warehouse and storage.

Originally on the site was the first steam-powered textile mill in the country, built by the Naumkeag Steam Cotton Company in 1839. As the sheeting it made was produced under the brand name of Pequot, it became known locally as the Pequot Mills. The original mill buildings were destroyed in 1914, a casualty of the Great Salem Fire of 1914. The buildings were rebuilt on the 30-acre (120,000 m^{2}) property between 1916 and 1924. The current management purchased the property in 1958.

Shetland Park, the city's largest office complex was sold in 2019 to Prime Storage Shetland, LLC, based in Saratoga Springs, New York for $70 million. Shetland Park was previously owned by Robert Lappin.
