= Carroll Bloom =

Canadian football player

Profile
- Position: Halfback

Personal information
- Born: March 11, 1928; Ottawa, Ontario, Canada
- Died: December 18, 1991 (aged 63); Ottawa, Ontario, Canada
- Listed height: 6 ft 0 in (1.83 m)
- Listed weight: 175 lb (79 kg)

Career history
- 1946: Ottawa Rough Riders
- 1947: Saskatchewan Roughriders

Patrick Carroll Bloom (March 11, 1928 – December 18, 1991) was a Canadian professional football player who played for the Saskatchewan Roughriders and Ottawa Rough Riders.
