= Myra Carroll Winkler =

American educator

Myra Carroll Winkler (1880 – August 21, 1963) was an American educator and was the first woman to hold elected office in El Paso County.

== Biography ==
Winkler was born in Corsicana, Texas and her father, Clinton M. Winkler, was one of the first judges on the Texas State Court of Appeals. Winkler's mother, A.V. Winkler, was active in collecting Confederate artifacts. Winkler attended and graduated from the Sam Houston Teacher's College, and moved to El Paso, Texas in 1902. In El Paso, Winkler taught at several El Paso public schools, including El Paso High School.

Winkler was elected superintendent of El Paso County schools in 1912, becoming the first woman elected to public office in El Paso County. Winkler was also one of eight women who were elected to the office of superintendent in Texas in 1912. Under her tenure as superintendent, she was responsible for improving many schools in El Paso County. She retired as superintendent in 1922. In 1923, Winkler became an adjunct professor of history and economics at the University of Texas at El Paso (UTEP), becoming the second woman to work as faculty at the school.

Winkler married Andrew Jackson Zilker in August 1925. In 1945, she was a candidate for earning her masters of science from the North Texas State College.

Winkler died on in her home in El Paso on August 21, 1963. A school, Myra Winkler County School, was named after her, though the name was changed to Travis Elementary School in the 1950s.
