= Carol (given name) =

- Gender: Unisex
- Language: English, Romanian

Origin
- Languages: English, Germanic, Latin
- Region of origin: Europe

Other names
- Variant forms: Carroll; Carrol; Caroll; Caryl; Caryll; Karyl; Carole; Carolle
- Related names: Karol, Caroly, Carola, Carolus, Charles, Carl, Caroline, Carolina, Carrie

Carol is a unisex given name in English, although in contemporary usage it is more commonly used for women. It is a variant of the English Charles, Germanic Carl, and Latin Carolus. Spelling variations include Carroll, Caryl, and Carole.

== Women ==
- Carol Alt (born 1960), American model and actress
- Carol Remmer Angle (born 1927), American pediatrician, nephrologist, and toxicologist
- Carol Anstey, Canadian politician
- Carol Banawa (born 1981), Filipino singer and actress
- Carol Jenkins Barnett (1956–2021), American businesswoman and philanthropist
- Carol Beaumont (born 1960), New Zealand unionist and Labour Party politician
- Carol Joyce Blumberg, American statistician
- Carol Borda (born 1995), Colombian politician
- Carol Moseley Braun (born 1947), American politician and lawyer, first African-American woman elected to the US Senate
- Carol Breen (born 1986), Irish footballer and Aussie rules player
- Carol Brewer, American politician
- Carol Burnett (born 1933), American comedian and actress
- Carol Castro (born 1984), Brazilian actress and producer
- Carol Channing (1921–2019), American singer, actress and comedian
- Carol Higgins Clark (1956–2023), American mystery writer, daughter of writer Mary Higgins Clark
- Carol Corrado, American economist
- Carol A. Gotway Crawford, American mathematical statistician
- Carol Lynn Curchoe (born 1979), American reproductive biologist
- Carol Dartora (born 1983), Brazilian politician, teacher and activist
- Carol Dempster (1901–1991), American actress
- Carol Folt (born 1951), president of the University of Southern California
- Carol W. Greider (born 1961), American molecular biologist
- Carol Hall (1936–2018), American composer and lyricist
- Carol Hall (politician), 21st century American politician
- Carol K. Hall, 20th-21st century American chemical engineer
- Carol Harrison (born 1955), British actress and writer
- Carol F. Henry (born 1939), American philanthropist
- Carol Henry (photographer) (born 1960), American fine arts photographer
- Carol Hirschfeld (born 1964), New Zealand journalist, documentary maker, broadcaster, and media executive
- Carol Jeffrey (1898–1998), English psychotherapist and writer
- Carol Jenkins (1947–1968), African-American murder victim
- Carol Johnson (disambiguation), various women, one man and a fictional character
- Carol Kane (born 1952), American actress
- Carol Kaye (born 1935), American bass guitarist and session musician
- Carol Kazeem, Pennsylvania State Representative
- Carol Lawrence (born 1932), American actress
- Carol D. Lee (born 1945), American academic and President of the National Academy of Education
- Carol Lewis (born 1963), American long jumper
- Carol Lunetta Cianca (1898–2002) Sicilian-born writer
- Carol Lynley (1942–2019), American actress
- Carol Mafagane, South African politician
- Carol Mann (1941–2018), American golfer
- Carol Marett (born 1944), New Zealand cricketer
- Carol Mavor, American writer and professor
- Carol Mutch (born 1953), New Zealand education academic
- Carol O'Sullivan, Irish-born translation scholar
- Carol Owens (disambiguation)
- Carol Oyler, (born 1947) New Zealand cricketer
- Carol Quillen, University president
- Carol Phiri, South African politician
- Carol Rabadi, Jordanian pilot
- Carol Rhodes (1959–2018), Scottish painter
- Carol Roberts (footballer) (born 1964), New Zealand footballer
- Carol Roberts (politician) (born 1936), American politician
- Carol R. Roberts (born 1942), American politician
- Carol Rubin (1945–2001), American film producer
- Carol Shand (born 1939), New Zealand doctor and advocate for women's health
- Carol Ruth Silver (born 1938), American lawyer and civil rights activist
- Carol Spradling (born 1950), American professor
- Carol Speed (1945–2022), American actress, author and singer-songwriter
- Carol M. Swain, American political scientist
- Carol Thatcher (born 1953), British journalist, author and media personality, daughter of former British prime minister Margaret Thatcher
- Carol J. Thiele, American microbiologist and cancer researcher
- Carol Tomcala (born 1954), Australian sports shooter
- Carol Twombly (born 1959), American designer
- Carol Vorderman (born 1960), British television presenter
- Carol Wayne (1942–1985), American actress
- Carol Wham, New Zealand scientist and professor of public health nutrition
- Carol Wilkinson (died 1977), murder victim
- Carol Zhao (born 1995), Canadian tennis player

== Men ==
- Carol I of Romania (1839–1914), King of Romania
- Carol II of Romania (1893–1953), King of Romania
- Carol Victor, Hereditary Prince of Albania (1913–1973), Prince of Albania
- Carol Antonio Altamirano (born 1963), Mexican politician and lawyer
- Carol Ardeleanu (1883–1949), Romanian writer
- Carol Bartha (1923–1976), Romanian footballer
- Carol Bedö (born 1930), Romanian gymnast
- Carol Benesch (1822–1896), Silesian architect
- Carol Burdan (born 1912), Romanian footballer
- Carol Corbu (born 1946), Romanian athlete
- Carol Creiniceanu (1939–2012), Romanian footballer
- Carol Davila (1828–1884), Romanian physician
- Carol Wallenstein de Vella (1795–1858), Croatian-born Romanian painter, art professor, and museographer
- Carol Fellowes, 4th Baron Ailwyn (1896–1988), British peer
- Carol Frech (1896–1959), Romanian striker
- Carol Haidu (1942–2022), Romanian footballer
- Carol Henry (actor) (1918–1987), American actor
- Carol Johnson (British politician) (1903–2000), British politician
- Carol Lambrino (1920–2006), eldest son of Carol II
- Carol Lindroos (1930–2001) Finnish athlete
- Carol Mather (1919–2006), British soldier and politician
- Carol G. Montgomery (1909–1950), American physicist
- Carol Partoș (1936–2015), Romanian and Swiss chess player
- Carol "Cass" Pennant, English writer and former football hooligan
- Carol Reed (1906–1976), British film director
- Carol Summers (1925–2016), American printmaker
- Carol Schuurman (1934–2009), Dutch footballer
- Carol Scrob (1856–1913), Romanian poet
- Carol Storck (1854–1926), Romanian sculptor
- Carol Szathmari (1812–1887), Austro-Hungarian-born Romanian painter and photographer
- Carol Telbisz (1853–1914), Austro-Hungarian politician
- Carol Vadnais (1945–2014), Canadian National Hockey League player
- Carol Vance, American attorney and politician
- Carol Vereș (1926–2017), Romanian rower
- Carol Voges (1925–2001), Dutch illustrator and cartoonist
- Cully Wilson (1892–1962), Canadian ice hockey player

== Fictional characters ==
- Carol (Dilbert), the Pointy-Haired Boss's secretary in the Dilbert comic strip
- Carol Beer, in the British comedy sketch series Little Britain
- Carol Burnett, an airline pilot in seasons four and five of the television series 30 Rock, played by Matt Damon
- Carol Danvers, a Marvel Comics superhero, formerly known as Ms. Marvel, currently known as Captain Marvel
- Carol Ferris, a DC Comics character, one of many using the name Star Sapphire, initially a supervillain, later a superhero
- Carol Hathaway, in the television series ER
- Carol Jackson, in the British soap opera EastEnders
- Carol Peletier, in the comic book and television series The Walking Dead
- Carol Willick, Ross Geller's lesbian ex-wife in NBC sitcom Friends
- Carol Sturka, the main character of the television series Pluribus (TV series) played by Rhea Seehorn

== See also ==
- Carol (disambiguation)
- Carlo (name)
- Carole, a list of people with the given name or surname
- Caroline (disambiguation), with many variants
- Karol (name)
