= Carol Roberts =

Carol Roberts may refer to:

- Carol Roberts (politician) (born 1936), Florida politician
- Carol Roberts (footballer) (born 1964), New Zealand footballer
- Carol R. Roberts (born 1942), New Hampshire politician

== See also ==
- Carol Robert of Anjou (1288–1342)
