= Thiel (surname) =

Thiel is a Germanic surname. Notable people with the name include:

- Adolf Thiel (1915–2001), German-American engineer
- Alvar Thiel (1893–1973), sailor
- Andreas Thiel (born 1960), German handball player
- Andreas Thiel (bishop) (1826–1908), Catholic bishop of Ermland
- Bert Thiel (1926–2020), baseball pitcher
- Claudia van Thiel (born 1977), female volleyball player
- Edward C. Thiel (1928–1961), geologist
- Edwin Thiel (1913–1944), German Luftwaffe ace
- Ernest Thiel (1859–1947), Swedish financier, art collector, and translator
- Frans-Jozef van Thiel (1906–1993), Dutch politician
- Heiner Thiel (born 1957), German sculptor and curator
- Heinz Thiel (1920–2003), German film director and screenwriter
- J. F. W. Thiel, founder of Princess Theatre (Sydney)
- Jana Thiel (1971–2016), German sports presenter and journalist
- Joachim Thiel (born 1951), German footballer
- Jon Thiel (born 1975), rugby player
- Lisa Thiel, a professional quizzer and regular panelist on UK quiz show Eggheads
- Lucien Thiel (1943–2011), Luxembourgian politician
- Marie-Jo Thiel (born 1957), French ethicist
- Maximilian Thiel (born 1993), German professional footballer
- Midori Kono Thiel (born 1933), Japanese American calligrapher
- Otto Thiel (1891–1915), German football player
- Peter Thiel (born 1967), American entrepreneur
- Peter Thiel (cross-country skier) (born 1943), German cross-country skier
- Phil Thiel (born 1984), American rugby union player
- Pieter J. J. van Thiel (1928–2012), Dutch art historian
- Sten Thiel, Commissioner of the Svenska Scoutförbundet
- Tamiko Thiel (born 1957), American media artist
- Udo Thiel (born 1954), German philosopher
- Walter Thiel (1910–1943), German engineer
- Walter Thiel (chemist) (1949–2019), German theoretical chemist
- Yannic Thiel (born 1989), German footballer

== Fictional characters ==
- Frank Thiel, detective chief inspector in German television series Tatort Münster

== See also ==
- Theil, common alternate & etymologically related variant of the surname
- Thiele, a common German language surname
