= Thiele =

Thiele is a German-language surname.

== Geographical distribution ==
As of 2014, 78.0% of all known bearers of the surname Thiele were residents of Germany, 10.9% of the United States, 2.3% of Australia, 2.0% of Brazil, 1.0% of Canada and 1.0% of South Africa.

In Germany, the frequency of the surname was higher than national average (1:1,741) in the following states:

1. Brandenburg (1:477)
2. Saxony-Anhalt (1:522)
3. Saxony (1:624)
4. Bremen (1:1,058)
5. Thuringia (1:1,132)
6. Lower Saxony (1:1,241)
7. Hamburg (1:1,465)
8. Mecklenburg-Vorpommern (1:1,689)
9. Berlin (1:1,708)

== People ==
- Alfonso Thiele (1922–1986), American Italian racing driver
- Allen Thiele (1940–2017), Master Chief Petty Officer of the Coast Guard
- Annekatrin Thiele (born 1984), German rower
- Arthur Thiele (1860–1936), German illustrator
- August Thiele (1894–1967), Vizeadmiral with the Kriegsmarine
- Aurelie Thiele, French professor using optimization algorithms to control costs in the healthcare industry
- Bob Thiele (1922–1996), record executive and composer, "discovered" Buddy Holly and the Crickets
- Bob Thiele Jr. (born 1955), American musician and music producer, son of Bob
- Carol J. Thiele, American microbiologist and cancer researcher
- Charles Thiele (1884–1954), American-Canadian bandmaster, musician and industrialist
- Colin Thiele (1920–2006), Australian writer of popular children's stories, including Storm Boy
- Dave Thiele (born circa 1952), Canadian politician
- Edwin R. Thiele (1895–1986), missionary and archaeologist, best known for his Old Testament chronology
- Ernest Thiele (1895–1993), influential chemical engineer
- Fred W. Thiele Jr. (born 1953), American politician
- Fritz Thiele (1894–1944), German member of the 20 July conspiracy to kill Hitler
- Gerhard Thiele (born 1953), ESA astronaut and geophysicist, on the Shuttle Radar Topography Mission
- Georg Thiele (1881–1914), Imperial German Navy officer
- Hans Thiele, Filipino professional basketball player
- Heinz Hermann Thiele (1941–2021), German businessman and chairman of Knorr-Bremse
- Hertha Thiele, German actress
- Holger Thiele (1878–1946), Danish-American astronomer
- Ilse Thiele (1920–2010), East German politician
- Jacob Thiele, musician for the rock group The Faint
- Joan Thiele (born 1991), Italian singer-songwriter
- Johan Rudolph Thiele (1736–1815), Danish book printer
- Johannes Thiele (zoologist) (1860–1935), German zoologist, and curator of the Museum of Natural History in Berlin
- Johannes Thiele (chemist) (1865–1918), chemist at LMU Munich
- Jürgen Thiele (born 1959), German rower
- Just Mathias Thiele (1795–1874), Danish writer and art historian
- Keith Thiele (1921–2016), New Zealand World War II pilot
- Kevin Thiele (born 1959), Australian botanist and taxonomist
- Klaus Thiele (born 1958), German athlete
- Leslie Thiele, American political scientist
- Neville Thiele, Australian engineer, known for Thiele/Small loudspeaker parameters
- Ria Thiele (1904–1996), German actress, dancer and choreographer
- Rolf Thiele (1918–1994), German film director
- Rüdiger Thiele (born 1943), German mathematician and historian of mathematics
- Thorvald N. Thiele (1838–1910), Danish astronomer and mathematician, associated with insurance company Hafnia
- Timmy Thiele (born 1991), German footballer
- Ulf Thiele (born 1971), German politician
- Walter Thiele (born 1921), German inventor
- Walter G. Thiele (1885–1968), associate Justice of the Kansas Supreme Court
- Wilhelm Thiele (1890–1975), Austrian screenwriter and film director
