= Worlds.com =

3D virtual world chat program from 1995

Worlds Chat, also known as Worlds.com, Worlds.net, or simply Worlds, was a 3D online chat program launched by Worlds Inc. in April 1995. It is recognized as one of the earliest programs of its kind.

In December 1998, Worlds Chat was succeeded by the WorldsPlayer program, also known as Worlds Ultimate 3D Chat on CD-ROM, and referred to as Worlds Platinum and Gamma in early SEC filings. It includes a separate code base, 3D avatars with animated actions, more default worlds, voice chat, and allows users to build their own worlds. From 1998 until August 6, 2024, WorldsPlayer servers remained online with an active community.

Around October 2025, the worlds.com and worlds.net domains expired and were not renewed, showing a GoDaddy parking page instead. As of January 2026, the worlds.com domain has been bought and registered under the AI company Worlds.

== Worlds Chat ==
Worlds Chat
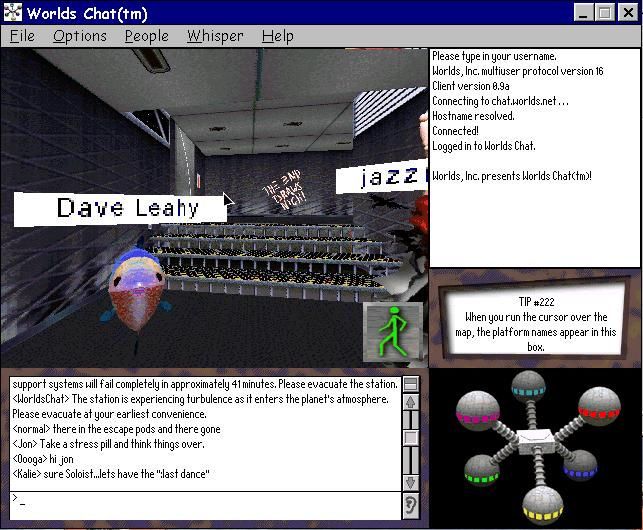
- A screenshot taken by user 'Avatar' showcasing the Worlds Chat demo interface and Space Station during the 'End of the World' event on September 16, 1996
- Developer: Worlds Inc. (formerly Knowledge Adventure Worlds)
- Release: April 1, 1995; 31 years ago
- Operating system: Microsoft Windows
- Successor: WorldsPlayer
- Available in: English, Japanese
- Website: www.worlds.com (archived)

=== History ===
Worlds Chat development began at Knowledge Adventure Worlds around 1994, eventually spinning off into its own company, Worlds Inc. During its beta period (1995–1996), Worlds Chat was available as a free demo for users who installed the 4-5 MB application on Windows 95, Windows NT, or Windows 3.1. On September 16, 1996, it officially launched as Worlds Chat Gold, featuring additional avatars, new worlds, and a retail CD-ROM version. Now there was a free demo version with limited features and a paid Gold version with expanded avatars, worlds, and more.

=== Team ===
Assembled by Dave Marvit (VP of Production), the original team that constructed Worlds Chat consisted of Andrea Gallagher (producer); Dave Leahy, Syed Asif Hassan, and Bo Adler (development); Tulley Straub, Jeff "Scamper" Robinson and Helen Cho (UI and graphics). The original client/server protocol for the multi-user environment was developed by Mitra Ardron, Bo Adler, Judy Challinger, and Dave Leahy (PTO US6219045). Contributors to the project included David Tolley (music), Wolf Schmidt (documentation), John Navitsky and Scott Benson (operations), Naggi Asmar (quality assurance), and others.

=== User interface ===
The Worlds Chat interface provided several sections, including a chat message window, a 3D interface similar to the video game Doom, and a space station map indicating the user's current location.

When launching the program, it offered users a selection of 15 pre-existing 2D avatars to serve as the user's representation within the virtual 3D environment. If no avatar was chosen, the default was a wooden crash dummy avatar. The gallery of avatars was presented from a first-person perspective. Upon clicking on an avatar, the user was placed within the central hub of a virtual space station, where they could interact with other online users who were also represented by avatars.

Within the virtual space station, users could navigate between platforms through sliding doors and hallways. Every new room or space served as a new area in which users could chat with one another. There were originally 20 rooms distributed among the Space Station world. It eventually expanded the number of worlds to include Sky world, Garden world, Sadness, and Glee.

=== Technical challenges ===
The first release of VRML, a standard for defining virtual worlds, was less than six months old when Worlds Chat was released, and thus still lacking in any best practices to use. Additionally, the speed of dial-up Internet connections placed limitations on the amount of information that could be transmitted to and from the Worlds Inc. servers. An increasing number of users alongside the expanding virtual world increased these pressures. Unlike other immersive environments of its day, it worked on lines as slow as 9600 baud.

In 2011, Tamiko Thiel, the creative director and producer at Worlds Inc. from 1994 to 1996 for the Starbright World project, wrote an article entitled "Cyber-Animism and Augmented Dreams" describing the history of virtual worlds, in which she wrote: "In the virtual worlds and avatar communities in the mid 1990s, we thought we all would start parallel, virtual, online existences in which we could create ourselves anew and realize our personal dream worlds. The technology however was too awkward, the processors and the Internet connections too slow, and the user base for our worlds never extended beyond a small dedicated community. By 2002, the virtual communities of the first generation all went bankrupt or looked for other ways to earn money."

== WorldsPlayer ==
WorldsPlayer
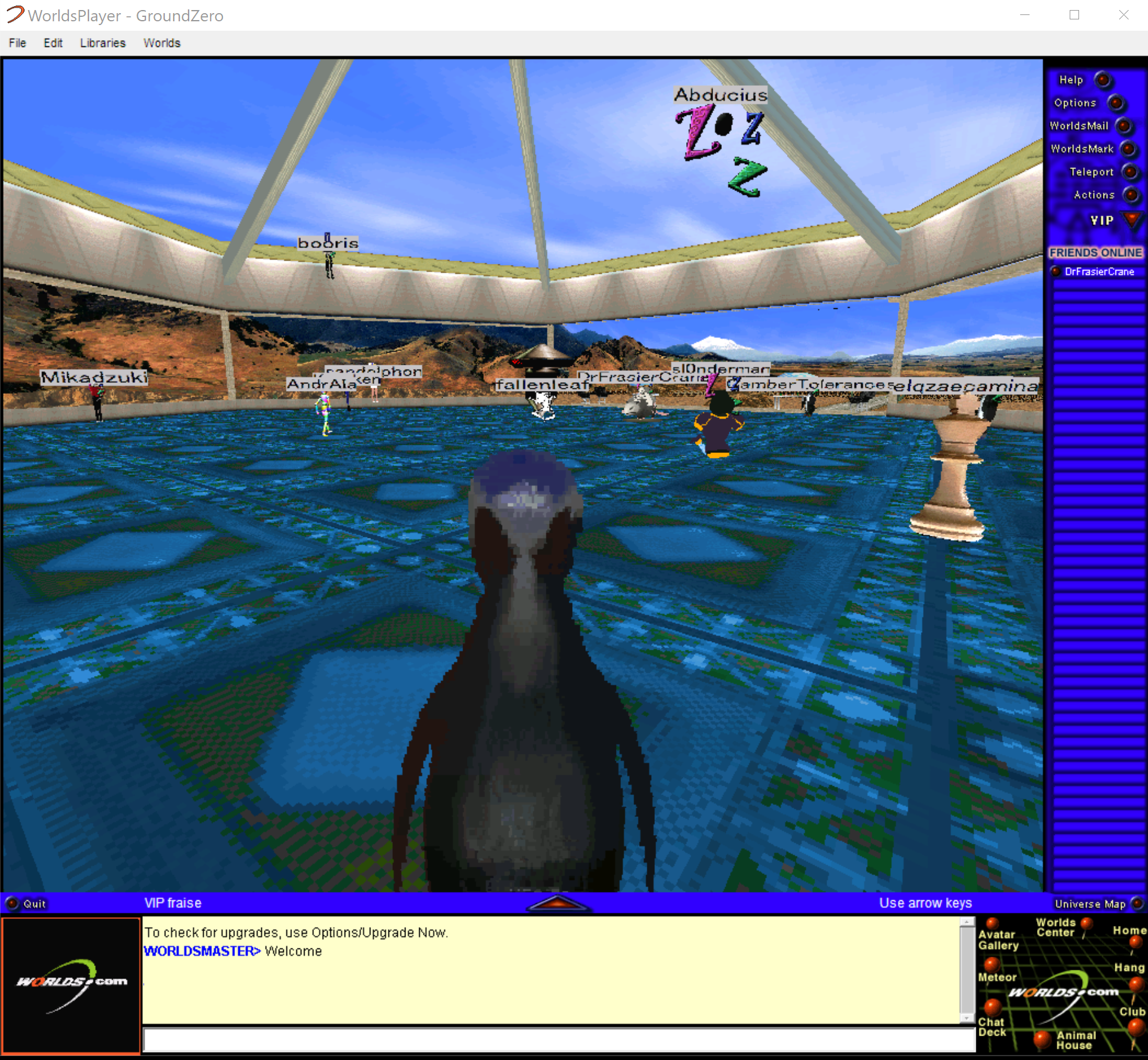
- Showcasing the WorldsPlayer interface, which includes a chat box, a universe map, a friends list, and a 3D virtual space known as Ground Zero
- Developer: Worlds Inc.
- Release: December 1, 1998; 27 years ago
- Stable release: v1922a11 / March 13, 2020; 6 years ago
- Operating system: Microsoft Windows
- Available in: English
- Website: www.worlds.com (archived)

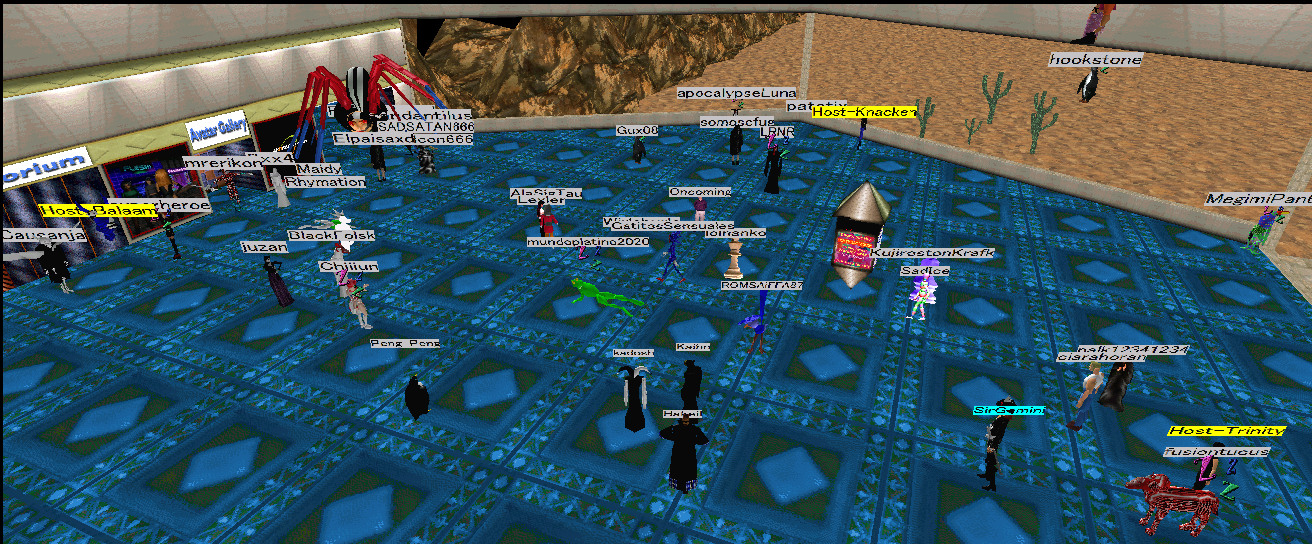
Users gathered in the default landing zone of WorldsPlayer, Ground Zero, on April 30, 2020. Regular users had gray name tags, moderators had yellow, and the lead moderator had a blue name tag.

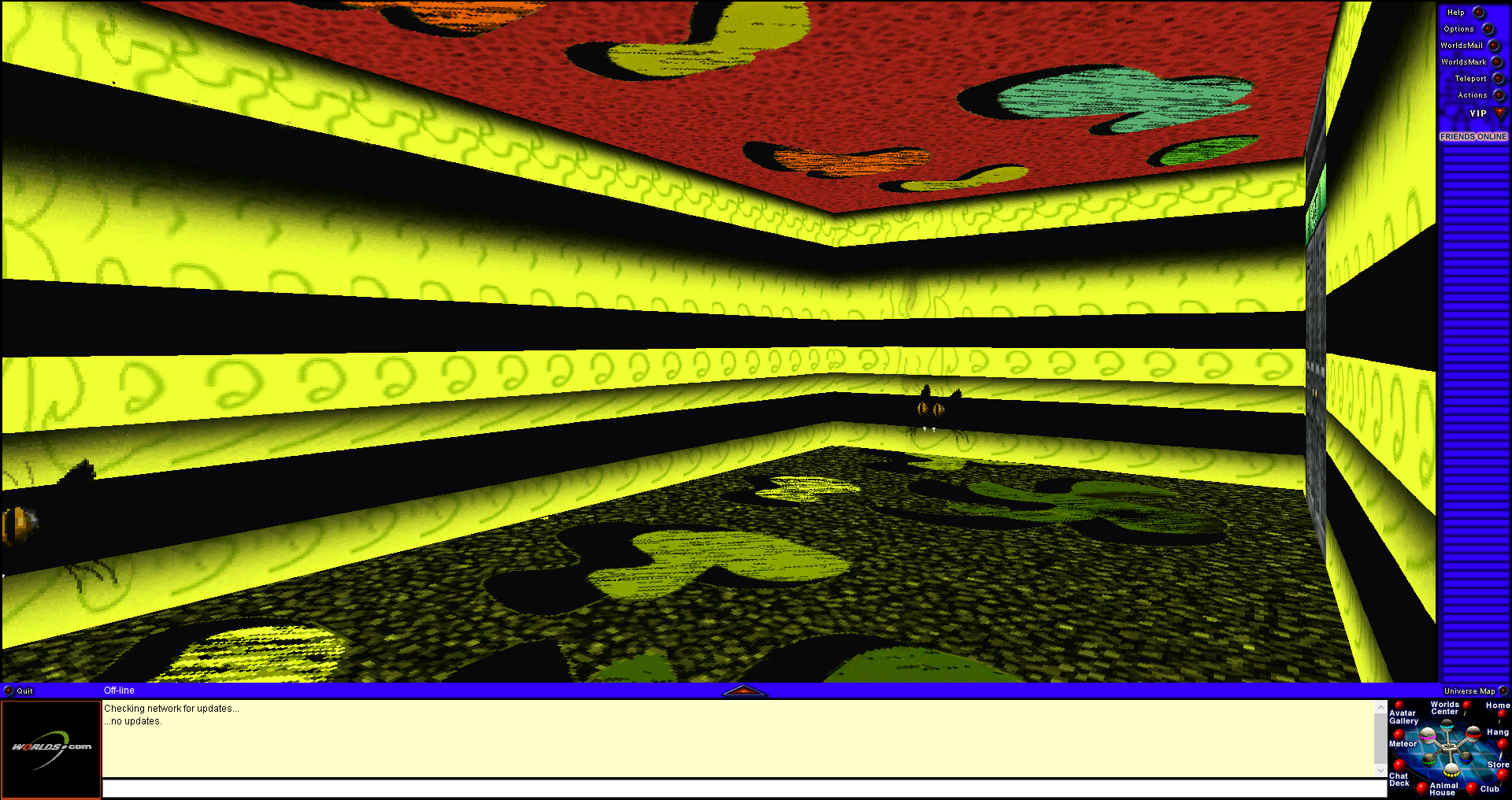
The Googie room, found in the Glee pod of the WorldsChat world within the WorldsPlayer client. This was a recreation of the same world available in its predecessor, the Worlds Chat client.

=== History ===
WorldsPlayer launched in December 1998 as Worlds Ultimate 3D Chat.

=== User interface ===
Using WorldsPlayer, a user assumes an avatar (a 2D holographic penguin by default) and can move, chat, express themselves via gestures, voice chat, send email, listen to in-world music, or view videos hosted in worlds.

=== Significance ===
Though it had tens of thousands of active users at the height of its popularity in 1999, it was much less by the 2010s. By the 2020s, it was considered a "digital ruins" by some academics.

=== Server outage ===
Due to a server misconfiguration, WorldsPlayer servers have been offline since August 6, 2024, preventing users from accessing online chat features. As of 2026, it appears that Worlds.com has been registered to an AI company and the client can no longer be downloaded. Clicking the link to download the WorldsPlayer client now directs to a 404 error. As of now, Worlds Inc. has not issued an official statement regarding the duration of the outage.

In response, multiple community-run servers have emerged, utilizing reverse-engineered software to allow users to interact and chat online within independent networks.

== See also ==
- Active Worlds
- Cyberspace
- Knowledge Adventure Worlds
- Metaverse
- Starbright World
- Virtual world
- VRML
