= Ria (given name) =

Ria is a feminine given name of multiple origins. In Western countries, it is often a short form of Maria. But it is mainly used in south indian communities depicting the hindhu goddess Lakshmi.

- Ria Ahlers (born 1954), Dutch high jumper
- Ria Antoniou (born 1988), Greek beauty pageant winner
- Ria Atayde (born 1992), Filipina actress
- Ria Bancroft (1907–1993), New Zealand sculptor
- Ria Baran (1922–1986), West German figure skater
- Ria Bartok, stage name of Marie-Louise Pleiss (1943–1970), French pop singer
- Ria Beckers (1938–2006), Dutch GreenLeft politician
- Ria Bond (born 1976), New Zealand politician
- Ria Brieffies (1957–2009), Dutch singer
- Ria Carlo (born 1974), Trinidad-born American pianist, mathematician and model
- Ria Cheruvu (born c. 2003), American child prodigy
- Ria Cortesio (born 1976), American baseball umpire
- Ria Ginster (1898–1985), German soprano
- Ria Hall (born c. 1982), New Zealand recording artist and presenter
- Ria van der Horst (born 1932), Dutch swimmer
- Ria Irawan (1969–2020), Indonesian actress and singer
- Ria Jende (1898–1927), Belgian-born German film actress
- Ria Kataja (born 1975), Finnish actress
- Ria Keburia, Georgian fashion designer
- Ria Lina (born 1980), British comedian, actress, and writer
- Ria Mae, (born 1991) Ria MacNutt, Canadian singer and songwriter
- Ria Meyburg (born 1939), Dutch artistic gymnast
- Ria Mooney (1904–1973), Irish actress, theater director, and acting teacher
- Ria Öling (born 1994), Finnish footballer
- Ria Oomen-Ruijten (born 1950), Dutch CDA politician and MEP
- Ria Percival (born 1989), New Zealand footballer
- Ria Persad (born 1974), Trinidad and Tobago-born American mathematician and a classical musician
- Ria Ramnarine (born 1978), Trinidadian boxer
- Ria Ritchie (born 1987), English singer-songwriter
- Ria Sabay (born 1985), German tennis player
- Ria Schiffner (born 1996), German ice dancer
- Ria Sharma (born 1992), Indian social activist
- Ria Stalman (born 1951), Dutch discus thrower and shot putter
- Ria van Stipdonk (born 1949), Dutch slalom canoeist
- Ria Thiele (1904–1996), German actress, dancer and choreographer
- Ria Thielsch (born 1951), New Guinea-born Dutch singer and model
- Ria Tobing (1938–2017), Indonesian swimmer
- Ria Valk (born 1941), Dutch singer
- Ria van Dyke (born 1989), New Zealand model and beauty pageant winner
- Ria Van Landeghem (born 1957), Belgian long-distance runner
- Ria Vandervis (born 1984), New Zealand actress
- Ria Vedder-Wubben (1951–2016), Dutch CDA politician
- Ria van Veen (1923–1995), Dutch swimmer
- Ria van Velsen (born 1939), Dutch artistic gymnast
- Ria van Velsen (1943–2025), Dutch swimmer
- Ria Visser (born 1961), Dutch speed skater
- Ria Wägner (1914–1999), Swedish journalist, author, translator, and television producer,
- Ria Wolmarans (1950–1996), Botswana murder victim
