= Carol Jenkins =

Carol Jenkins may refer to:

- Carol Heiss (born 1940), American figure skater and actress
- Carol Jenkins Barnett (born 1956), American philanthropist and businesswoman
- Carol Marie Davis Jenkins (1947–1968), African American woman murdered in Indiana
- Carol Mayo Jenkins (born 1938), American actress
- Carol Jenkins (activist), American journalist and activist
- Carol Jenkins (poet), Australian poet
