= Lachsack =

Novelty toy

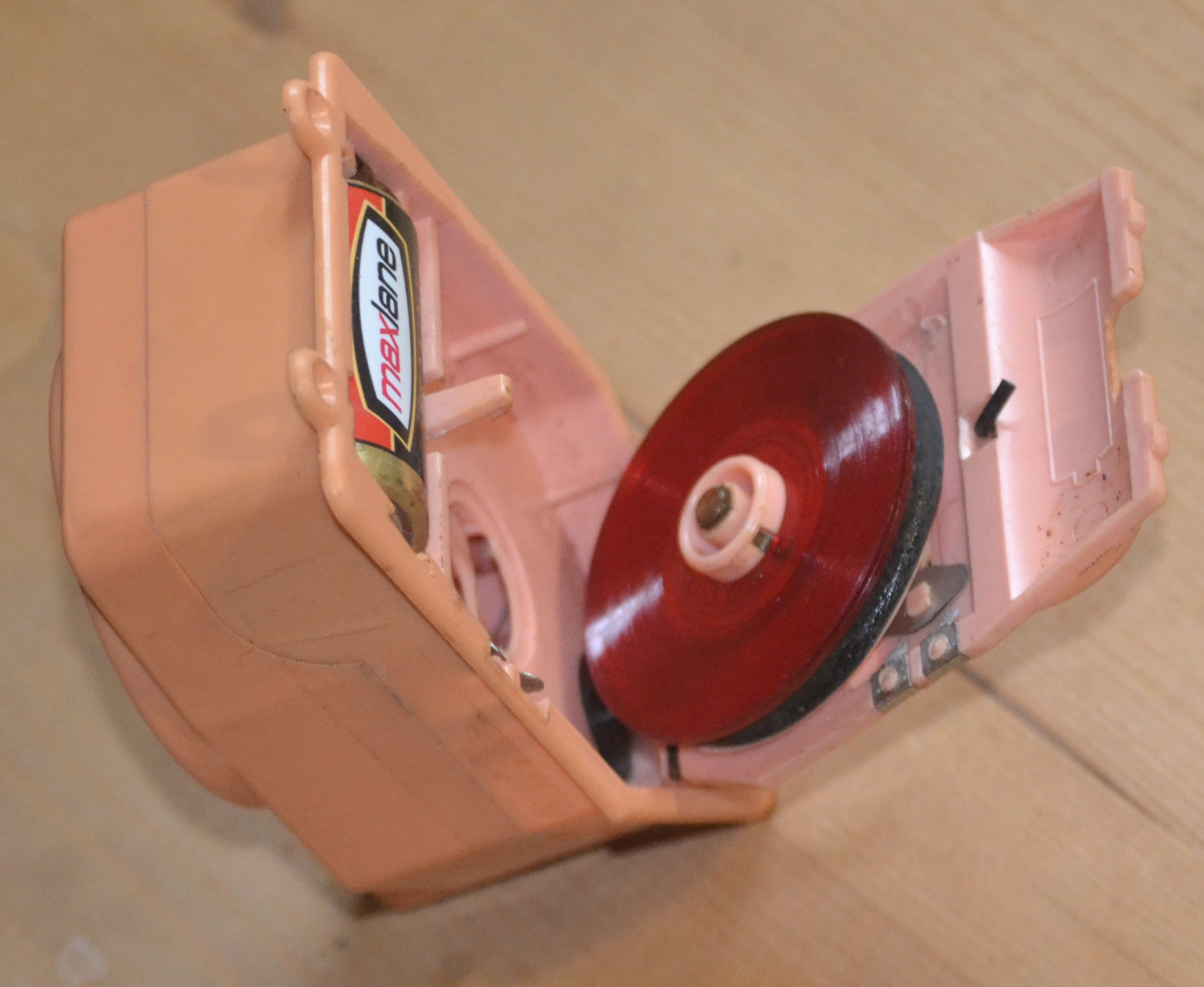

A Lachsack (German, literally "laugh bag") is a novelty toy consisting of a small cloth bag containing a plastic box with a push button that, when pressed, plays recorded laughter.

The Lachsack was invented in 1968 by German inventor Walter Thiele. It was the most successful of about 1,600 items he invented. The device originated from a talking parrot soft toy that he produced for the Wienerwald restaurant chain. When the company rejected the parrot, Thiele placed its miniature battery-driven record player into a sock, replacing the disk recording with one of laughter and named it the Lachsock (laugh sock).

The Lachsock was successful. Thiele developed the concept by staging a laughing contest and using a recording of the winner's laughter in the redesigned Lachsack in which the sock was replaced by a small sack. The winner, a tax inspector from Nuremberg, was offered a prize of either 1,000 Marks or a 10 Pfennig royalty per Lachsack sold. He played safe and chose the lump sum. An estimated 120 million had been sold by 2007 and the Lachsack is still in production.

The original Lachsack was a brown bag made of jute. Today's versions usually are smaller, available in different colours and use digital audio technology. The toy is sold under several different names such as Laugh Bag, Laughing Bag, Bag of Laughs and Bag of Joys.
