= Bob Mead =

American politician

Member of the New Hampshire House of Representatives from the 4th Hillsborough district
- In office December 3, 2008 – December 2, 2010
- Preceded by: Pamela Coughlin
- Succeeded by: Jennifer Bernet
- In office December 1, 2004 – December 6, 2006
- Preceded by: Pierre Bruno
- Succeeded by: Jennifer Bernet

Personal details
- Born: Robert Darrold Mead; September 16, 1937 (age 89) Canby, California, U.S.
- Party: Republican
- Spouse: Susan
- Education: San Jose City College (AA); University of Massachusetts (BS)

Military service
- Allegiance: United States
- Branch/service: United States Navy
- Years of service: 1955–1962

Robert Darrold Mead (born September 16, 1937) is an American politician who served as a Republican member of the New Hampshire House of Representatives. First coming to the House in 2004, he lost a bid for a second term in 2006. He was elected in both 2008 and 2010 but resigned at the start of the 2011 legislative session to become Speaker Bill O'Brien's chief of staff.

In December 2011, Mead was named director of legislative services in the House Majority Office. He resigned the following May after a report that he used taxpayer money to fund trips to party political events.
