= Carole Johnson =

Carole Johnson may refer to:

- Carole Johnson (dancer) (born 1940), an African American dancer, choreographer and administrator who played an important role in the development of Indigenous Australian contemporary dance
- Carole Johnson (health official), administrator of Health Resources and Services Administration since January 2022
- Carole Johnson, a beauty queen who was Miss West Virginia, U.S. in 1961
- Carole Johnson, Labour candidate in the 2021 Bristol City Council election, UK

== See also ==
- Carol Johnson (disambiguation)
