= Quest for the Code =

2003 video game

- Developer: Starbright
- Publisher: Starbright
- Platform: Windows
- Release: May 28, 2002
- Genre: Educational

Starbright Asthma CD-ROM Game: Quest for the Code is an interactive asthma management adventure game developed by Starbright. The game is available in both English and Spanish and free to both children with asthma and their carers. The game was designed for educational purposes.

Originally developed as a CD-ROM game for use in schools, it was later made available online for free for use by parents, teachers, and students.

It was part of a series including Starbright Diabetes CD-Rom, Starbright Explorer Series, and Starbright Hospital Pals.

== Production and release ==
In May 2002, The Starlight Children's Foundation, chaired by Steven Spielberg and General H. Norman Schwarzkopf announced the educational CD-Rom. It was developed using input of an advisory team of national pediatric asthma experts. The making, funding and distribution of "Quest" was assisted by Home Shopping Network, Technicolor, Ivy Hill Corp., ImagEngine Corp. and GlaxoSmithKline, and it was described as "widely distributed". It was made available for free at the National Library of Medicine's Virtual Asthma Exhibit. In November 2002, the developers received a grant from the Centers for Disease Control and Prevention's (CDC) adolescent and school health program, allowing them to distribute the game to school nurses at more than 30,000 elementary, middle and high schools free of charge. Due to a grant from The California Endowment, the game was included in a distributed Asthma Tool Kit. In 2007, Starlight converted the game to a web-based platform.

== Gameplay and plot ==
While play throughout the levels are in general linear, players are given two to three decision-making checkpoints that affect elements of the narrative. An Implementation guide was packaged with some versions that gave teachers tips on how to integrate the game into school learning.

== Cast ==
The game features many celebrities in roles:

- Cuba Gooding, Jr. as your guide, Cyrus
- Diane Sawyer as "The Newscaster"
- Kelsey Grammer as Mucus Airgon, leader of the Evil Seven
- General H. Norman Schwarzkopf as Robo-Roach
- Whoopi Goldberg as Moldy
- Funkmaster Flex as Mold Mob game announcer
- Jeff Goldblum as Alex Dander
- Shaquille O'Neal as The Fuminator
- Glenn Close as Chalktisha
- Gwyneth Paltrow as Perfuma
- Minnie Driver as Smokita

== Critical reception ==
A paper from Syracuse University found that the game was promising in empowering those living with asthma and their families to take control of the disease. A paper from Arizona State University found the game to "be an effective tool for asthma education in a classroom setting". Practitioner Eleanor Thornton wrote that the game offered a "truly interactive, inexpensive game" experience that was lacking in her resources.

== See also ==
- Starbright World
