= Starbright World =

Former online community for chronically ill children

Starbright World was an online community for children with chronic illnesses established in 1995. Initially conceived as a 3D virtual world for use in hospitals, it was developed by Worlds Inc. for the Starbright Foundation. The 3D world―credited as one of the first applications of virtual reality in medicine―operated until 1997, when it was shut down due to technical issues. In 1998, it was replaced with a private social network, which is now defunct. Worlds Inc. would later launch lawsuits against several massively multiplayer online game companies, claiming that they held the rights to the concept of multiplayer virtual worlds based on patents obtained in relation to Starbright World.

== Virtual world ==
A screenshot of the "BYOZ" (Build Your Own Zone) area of Starbright World. In the BYOZ area, children could build new objects and structures.

The planning for Starbright World began in 1993. The project was organized by the Starbright Foundation, a charity headed by Steven Spielberg which was a sister organization of the Starlight Children's Foundation. Initially, Starbright World was conceived as a 3D virtual world in which children could interact with each other using avatars. Tamiko Thiel, working under Worlds Inc., was the creative director, and companies such as Sprint and Intel partnered with Starbright to provide the necessary equipment and infrastructure. Development costs were estimated to be in the "multimillions". The program was officially launched on November 8, 1995, with four hospitals participating.

Players accessed Starbright World through terminals connected to a private DS3 network that linked hospitals to one another. In the 3D world, children could chat with other users, play games and build new structures. The program also supported videoconferencing. Spielberg and Norman Schwarzkopf Jr. (Starbright's chair of fundraising) made cameos in the game as E.T. and a teddy bear, respectively. Starbright World was an early example of a virtual world game and one of the first uses of virtual reality in medicine.

The technology, though advanced for the time, was not without issues. An editor for the New York Times criticized Starbright World for being "slow and clumsy" and lacking interactive activities. A pilot study found that players encountered serious technical difficulties about a quarter of the time, although performance improved over the course of the study. In 1997, the 3D world was shut down due to concerns about stability and ease of use.

== Later history ==
Starbright World was relaunched in July 1998 as a social network including message boards, chat rooms, videoconferencing and games. It was initially accessible only through a private network installed in hospitals; by 2000, 80 American hospitals were using the program. Later versions could be accessed from home. Several clinical trials evaluated the effect of the social network on patients' symptoms and quality of life. The website is no longer operational.

In the 2000s, Worlds Inc. claimed that they held the rights to the concept of multiplayer virtual worlds based on patents relating to Starbright World. This led them to file lawsuits against several MMO companies. A lawsuit against Activision Blizzard was dismissed in 2021, when a US district court ruled that "Worlds' patents were abstract ideas that were not sufficiently transformative to be legally patentable."

== See also ==
- Quest for the Code
