= Danny, the Champion of the World (film) =

1989 film directed by Gavin Millar

- UK DVD cover
- Based on: Danny, the Champion of the World by Roald Dahl
- Screenplay by: John Goldsmith
- Directed by: Gavin Millar
- Starring: Jeremy Irons; Robbie Coltrane; Samuel Irons; Cyril Cusack; Michael Hordern; Lionel Jeffries; Jean Marsh; Jimmy Nail; Ronald Pickup; John Woodvine
- Music by: Stanley Myers
- Countries of origin: United Kingdom; United States
- Original language: English

Production
- Executive producers: Alan Horrox; Paulo de Oliveira; Carol Rubin; Jay Rayvid; Dale Bell; Simon Relph; Monica Sims
- Producer: Eric Abraham
- Cinematography: Oliver Stapleton
- Editors: Peter Tanner; Angus Newton
- Running time: 96 minutes
- Production company: Portobello Productions
- Budget: $3 million

Original release
- Network: The Disney Channel (United States); ITV (United Kingdom)
- Release: 29 April 1989

Roald Dahl's Danny, the Champion of the World, or simply Danny, the Champion of the World, is a 1989 comedy drama television film directed by Gavin Millar from a screenplay by John Goldsmith, based on the 1975 novel Danny, the Champion of the World by Roald Dahl. The film was produced by Portobello Productions, in association with Thames Television, The Disney Channel, Wonderworks, British Screen, and the Children's Film and Television Foundation. The film stars Jeremy Irons as William Smith, with his son, Samuel, in the title role of Danny Smith, of which the father and son conspire to thwart a local businessman's plans to buy their land by poaching his game pheasants. It was filmed on location in Oxfordshire, with Stonor Park, Henley-on-Thames, being a prominent feature in the film.

Danny, the Champion of the World debuted in the United States on 29 April 1989, on The Disney Channel. In the United Kingdom, the film premiered at the Odeon West End in London on 27 July and received a theatrical release on 28 July, by Portobello Productions, before being exhibited on television on 26 December, on ITV.

== Plot ==
In 1955, in the English Countryside, impoverished widower William Smith lives with his nine-year-old son Danny in an old vardo behind the garage and filling station they operate together. Wealthy local profiteer Victor Hazell, who has bought all of the surrounding land, tries to convince the Smiths to sell as well, but William refuses to budge. In response, Hazell uses his influence to have government inspectors harass the Smiths over various trivialities. Danny fixes a child welfare officer's rattling old car when she arrives, and she agrees to see to it that no more inspectors bother the Smiths. Another inspector privately advises William to “hang on” to his land.

Meanwhile, Danny starts a new term at school. Delivering a car repair bill to his kindly headmaster, Mr. Snoddy, Danny accidentally discovers Mr. Snoddy is a heavy gin drinker and agrees to keep his secret. This incident causes Danny to be late for class; his harsh new teacher, Captain Lancaster, gives him a warning. When Danny is late a second time after helping a rabbit escape a snare set up by Hazell, Lancaster gives him 1,000 lines to write.

One night, William sneaks out of the vardo. Discovering this, Danny stays up waiting for him until he returns. William explains that he had been attempting to poach some of Hazell's pheasants as a playful revenge, using raisins as bait; William and his late father poached birds this way during the Great Depression. With Danny's blessing, William makes a second attempt some days later. Danny goes to bed but later awakens to find William is still not home, despite having promised to be home more than three hours before. William has been repairing an old Austin 7, so Danny sets out in the car to find his father, narrowly escaping a passing police car in the process. Once in Hazell's woods, Danny overhears Hazell's gamekeepers Rabbets and Springer, who are gloating over an injured poacher who has fallen into their illegal pit trap.

After they leave to fetch Hazell, Danny discovers the trapped poacher is William, helps him out of the pit, and drives him back home to have his broken ankle treated by Doc Spencer. Having suspected William to be the injured poacher, Hazell sends Police Sergeant Enoch Samways to question William about his injuries; however, Samways dislikes Hazell, and falsifies the report to say that William injured himself falling down the vardo stairs. Doc Spencer agrees with this decision, as William could have been killed by falling in the trap. Hazell later arrives, flanked by his two gamekeepers, and warns William that he will be shot if he trespasses on his land. William then orders him to leave.

When Captain Lancaster mistakenly believes he has caught Danny cheating on a test, he canes Danny's hand. Mr. Snoddy intervenes and threatens to dismiss Lancaster, as corporal punishment is not allowed in the school. Later, Danny and William learn that Mr. Hazell will be holding a huge pheasant shoot on his property to impress some of the local aristocracy. Hoping to embarrass Hazell, Danny decides he and William should drug the pheasants using a sedative Doc Spencer has prescribed for William. The Smiths stay up late to crush the pills and stuff the raisins with the powder, causing Danny to fall asleep in school the next day. Lancaster keeps Danny after school, ordering him to run laps as punishment; however, Danny escapes the schoolyard, and Lancaster chases him, ripping the seat of his trousers when attempting to climb over a wall. Embarrassed, Lancaster announces his immediate resignation, much to Mr. Snoddy's delight.

The night before the shoot, Danny and William manage to drug and capture all the pheasants, hiding them in the garage. The party guests mock Hazell when no pheasants appear at the shoot, and Hazell sends Rabbets and Springer to investigate. The keepers discover that the pheasants are drunkenly flying around William's property, having awakened sooner than expected. Soon, Hazell and most of the villagers have gathered to see the spectacle. Hazell wants William arrested, but Sergeant Samways reminds Hazell that game laws decree live pheasants belong to whoever owns the land they are on. Hearing that William still owns his land, Mr. Tallon, a developer, steps forward. It turns out that, without William's centrally located property, Hazell can't go ahead with a secret plan to build a newer and bigger town, "Hazellton", practically on top of the village itself. Humiliated, Hazell angrily drives away. Danny sets the pheasants free, and the local people celebrate the happy ending together.

== Main cast ==
Actor	Role
Jeremy Irons	William Smith
Robbie Coltrane	Victor Hazell
Samuel Irons	Danny Smith
Cyril Cusack	Doc Spencer
Michael Hordern	Lord Claybury
Lionel Jeffries	Mr. Snoddy (Headmaster)
Jean Marsh	Miss Hunter (Social Worker)
John Grillo	Mr Parker (Social Worker)
Jimmy Nail	Rabbetts (Head Gamekeeper)
William Armstrong	Springer (Gamekeeper)
Ronald Pickup	Captain Lancaster
John Woodvine	Tallon

== Home media releases ==
The film was originally released on VHS by MSD Video in 1989 under their Tempo Video children's label.

A Region 2 DVD was released in 2005 by Warner Home Video. It includes a documentary feature titled Danny and the Dirty Dog (referring to Victor Hazell, who is described as a "dirty dog" by Roald Dahl), which features interviews with Roald Dahl, Jeremy Irons, and Robbie Coltrane (in character as Victor Hazell).

== Reception ==
The film had mostly positive reviews. Some viewers were pleased in particular by the film's positively-updated view on the subject of corporal punishment in schools, which Dahl was an outspoken opponent of, particularly because he himself had suffered permanent injuries to his buttocks.
