= Jennifer Bernet =

American politician (born 1962)

Member of the New Hampshire House of Representatives from the 4th Hillsborough district
- In office December 5, 2018 – December 2, 2020
- Preceded by: Carol R. Roberts
- Succeeded by: Jim Kofalt
- In office May 25, 2011 – December 5, 2012
- Preceded by: Bob Mead
- Succeeded by: Steve Spratt
- In office December 6, 2006 – December 3, 2008
- Preceded by: Bob Mead
- Succeeded by: Frank Holden

Personal details
- Born: August 21, 1962 (age 64)
- Party: Democratic
- Education: SUNY Oneonta (BA); Antioch University (MEd); University of New Hampshire (MSW)

Jennifer Bernet (born August 21, 1962) is an American social worker and Democratic politician who was a member of the New Hampshire House of Representatives. First elected in 2006, she failed to retake the seat in 2008 and 2010. In 2011, when Bob Mead resigned to be chief of staff to Speaker Bill O'Brien, Bernet handily won a special election to take his place. Following redistricting in 2012, she again lost reelection and ran in 2014 for a seat on the Executive Council of New Hampshire. She returned to the House in 2018 and served until 2020.
