= Murder of Carol Jenkins =

African American woman murdered in 1968

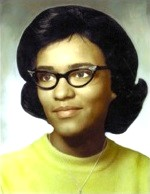
- Jenkins, c. 1965
- Location: 39.42780°N 86.42230°W; East Morgan Street, Martinsville, Indiana, U.S.
- Date: September 16, 1968; 58 years ago c. 9:03 p.m. (UTC-4)
- Deaths: Carol Marie Jenkins (21)
- Perpetrators: Kenneth Clay Richmond (36); Unidentified second perpetrator
- Motive: Anti-black racism; Hate crime
- Charges: Murder (Richmond)
- Verdict: Declared incompetent to stand trial due to cognitive decline (Richmond)

Carol Jenkins was a 21-year-old African-American woman who was stabbed once through the right atrium of her heart in a racist murder which occurred as she attempted to sell encyclopedias door to door in Martinsville, Indiana on September 16, 1968. Her murder occurred in an almost exclusively white city with a documented history of racial segregation. The perpetrators of her murder were two white men—one of whom has never been identified. The murder itself was widely reported in local and national media and has been described as one of Indiana's most notorious cold cases of the civil rights era.

Jenkins's murder remained unsolved for over thirty years until the daughter of one of the perpetrators provided a tip to investigators naming her father, Kenneth Clay Richmond, as one of the perpetrators of the murder. Richmond–a Ku Klux Klan affiliate–was arrested and charged with first-degree murder in May 2002; however, a Morgan County Superior Court judge later declared him incompetent to stand trial due to his declining health. Richmond himself died of bladder cancer two weeks after this ruling.

Carol Jenkins is sometimes referred to as the Girl in the Yellow Scarf due to an item of clothing she wore at the time of her murder which Richmond's daughter–who witnessed the murder as a seven-year-old child–distinctively recalled in her memory; this item of clothing Jenkins wore at the time of her murder had been information which investigators had withheld from the public.

== Early life ==
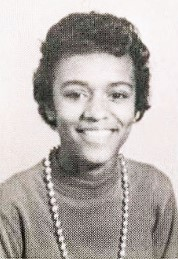
Carol Jenkins, pictured in 1962

Carol Marie Jenkins was born in Franklin, Indiana, on April 21, 1947, the only child born to Carl Egbert and Elizabeth Ann (née Gooden) Jenkins. Her father was a general laborer, and her mother a bookkeeper.

Jenkins's parents divorced when she was an infant; her mother retained custody of her, with her father subsequently relocating to Columbus. Shortly thereafter, Elizabeth Jenkins began dating a machine repairman named Paul Willard Davis, who accepted and raised Jenkins as his own child. The couple relocated to Rushville, where they married in September 1949. He and Elizabeth would have five more children—Paulette, Patricia Ann, Larry, Robert, and Laura Mae—prior to divorcing amicably in 1967. All six siblings were raised impartially, and all maintained contact with both parents following their divorce. Her family was religious and regularly attended services at Rushville's Wesley United Methodist Church.

In the 1950s and 1960s, Rushville was a relatively small and predominantly white rural town with a population of approximately 7,000 inhabitants. Jenkins and her siblings were among the few black students at Rushville High School, although they seldom experienced any discrimination and had both black and white friends. By her teens, Jenkins aspired to move to Chicago and become either a fashion model or, due to her love of children, a teacher. She grew to be 5 ft 3 in (160 cm) tall and approximately 110 pounds and has been described as a slightly introverted yet friendly, intelligent and polite young woman.

Shortly after graduating from Rushville High School in 1965, Jenkins obtained employment upon an assembly line at the plant of the Philco Division of the Ford Motor Company in Connersville, Indiana; here, she became acquainted with a welder one year her senior named John Wesley Scales Jr. Shortly thereafter, the two began dating. By early 1968, Jenkins and Scales had become engaged; on March 4, both applied for a marriage license.

Jenkins remained in the same employment until the summer of 1968, when a 64-day union strike saw approximately 3,500 union members refuse to work, thus temporarily causing the plant's closure. Due to this ongoing strike, plus the fact Jenkins had by 1968 moved into her own rented home, she and four other female employees including her close friend Paula Norene Bradley resolved to find temporary alternate employment.

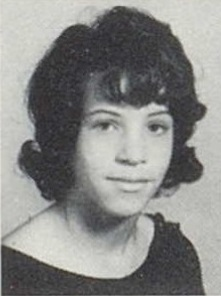
Jenkins's close friend Paula Bradley, pictured in 1965

=== Encyclopedia saleswoman ===
That September, Jenkins obtained employment with a Collier's Encyclopedia sales crew as a door-to-door saleswoman. She had been in this employment for a matter of days and had just completed an intense three-day sales training course in Indianapolis when, at approximately 4:30 p.m. on Monday, September 16, she and three others traveled Vincennes, Indiana. Each had several encyclopedias in their possession. Accompanying Jenkins were her sales manager, Daniel Julian (30) and colleagues John Burton (20) and her friend Paula Bradley (19). Both males were white, with Bradley of both black and Caucasian ancestry and markedly light-skinned. (Note: Some sources state Paula Norene Bradley to be solely of black ancestry.)

Due to travel logistics, en route to Vincennes, the sales crew's plans changed, with their sales destination changing to Martinsville, Indiana—a known sundown town, yet considerably closer to Rushville than Vincennes. (Note: In 1968, Martinsville was a working-class town with a population of approximately 8,550 inhabitants.) As Jenkins was traveling with three co-workers, she may have believed she would be safe, although she is known to have remarked to Bradley shortly before embarking on her sales route: "Well, I'm glad I wore pants today because I might have to run." She was dressed in a white cotton turtleneck sweater, a pair of olive-green wool pants, and a brown jacket.

== September 16, 1968 ==
=== Martinsville sales route ===
In Martinsville, the three junior members of the sales crew took separate sales routes, with Jenkins assigned a route on the eastern side of the city, Bradley the western side, and Burton the north. All three were given instructions to meet their colleagues at a delegated rendezvous point close to the city's central square at an agreed later time.

Initially, Jenkins encountered little or no bigotry or harassment as she canvassed her assigned route, and several residents of homes she initially called upon later informed police they had found Jenkins to be a pleasant and intelligent young woman, with one resident—noting she was not appropriately dressed for the evening's forecast rainfall—giving her a bright yellow paisley scarf. However, somewhere in the vicinity of Columbus Drive, two young white men in a black 1965 or 1966 model Mercury Comet began to follow Jenkins, hurling racial slurs and other derogatory comments. Evidently, this experience greatly unnerved Jenkins, as at approximately 7:40 p.m., she approached the home of a young, recently married white couple named Donald Lee and Norma Jean (née Campbell) Neal, seeking help and asking them: "Please let me in. I've got somebody following me." The Neals allowed Jenkins into their home as the Comet initially remained parked outside their home. Jenkins informed the Neals this vehicle had been following her for several minutes, with the occupants shouting racial abuse. Donald Neal exited his home. Moments later, the parked Comet drove away from the scene. Donald also observed a light-colored sedan with its parking lights on parked nearby; he made a mental note of the license plate number before this vehicle also drove away.

The Neals telephoned the police, and an officer named Clarence Richards was dispatched to their home. According to Richards, Jenkins was unable to provide an accurate description of the young men who had harassed her or their vehicle, although she believed that one of the men had been fairly short. She also refused his offer to drive her to the local Sunoco service station on Morgan Street, where she was to meet her colleagues. Having been provided with a description of the vehicle by Donald Neal, Richards briefly patrolled the vicinity of the Neal residence in an unsuccessful effort to locate the vehicle.

After Richards left the Neal residence, the couple offered to let Jenkins stay at their home until she was scheduled to meet her three colleagues at 9 p.m. Jenkins thanked them, but turned down the offer, saying: "No, I've bothered you people long enough, I'll just go on back." Norma then briefly drove Jenkins around the neighborhood in an unsuccessful effort to locate one of her colleagues before driving back to her home.

At approximately 8:30 p.m., Jenkins—again accompanied by Norma Neal—left the Neal household; the two walked several blocks together. Norma accompanied Jenkins to the corner of East Columbus Street and Home Avenue, from where Jenkins continued walking to her scheduled rendezvous point alone as Norma Neal returned home at the beginning of a heavy rainfall. (Note: Reflecting upon the mutual agreement between herself and Jenkins to part company at the corner of East Columbus Street and Home Avenue, Norma Neal would state in February 2014: "She was such a nice person. Very polite. I mean, if [I] could go back and redo time, I would have dragged her back [to my home].") Jenkins was last seen alive minutes later walking alone in the vicinity of Home Avenue and Washington Street by a young man, who later described her demeanor as "cheerful", adding that, as he passed her on the street, she had said "Hello" to him.

Detectives converge at the location on East Morgan Street where Carol Jenkins fell. September 17, 1968.

=== Murder ===
Approximately thirty minutes after leaving the Neal residence, as Jenkins walked alone along East Morgan Street (then known as State Road 37), two men pulled their car to the side of the road and exited the vehicle. Jenkins's arms were held behind her back by one assailant, while the other stabbed her once in the chest with a flat-blade screwdriver, penetrating her chest to a depth of 4.4 centimeters, fracturing her sternum and piercing the right atrium of her heart. (Note: Upon concluding Jenkins's autopsy, Morgan County Coroner James Summers would conclude her murderer had pulled the screwdriver upwards after plunging the instrument into her heart, lengthening the dimensions of the entry wound and causing a larger laceration to her right atrium.) The two then fled the scene. An eyewitness named Hayward Bellah—who witnessed the aftermath of Jenkins's stabbing—later informed investigators that, minutes after 9 p.m., having heard commotion across the street from his apartment, he had looked out his window and observed Jenkins staggering approximately twenty feet before falling onto the rain-soaked sidewalk close to the corner of North Graham Street as a car sped from the scene. Bellah ran from his apartment to find Jenkins unresponsive on the sidewalk; he was unable to detect a pulse, although he was able to note her "gasping for air". Bellah then ran to a nearby restaurant to call for help. Jenkins was promptly taken to the Morgan County Hospital, where she was pronounced dead at 9:25 p.m.

By 10:15 p.m., both Paula Bradley and John Burton had arrived at the crew's agreed rendezvous point on Morgan Street; both were told by their sales manager at this time that Jenkins had been murdered.

An examination of the crime scene yielded little physical evidence. The murder weapon was never located, although Jenkins's sales route folder was discovered approximately twenty feet from her body, indicating she had either dropped the folder at the site of her initial assault, or the item had been torn from her possession at this location. Her glasses were discovered three feet from her folder, and her notebook was discovered in the entrance to an auto-repair shop approximately 170 feet from her body, indicating Jenkins may have been chased for up to 150 feet before her assailants exited their vehicle and fatally stabbed her.

== Funeral ==
Carol Marie Jenkins was laid to rest on the afternoon of September 19, 1968. She was laid to rest within East Hill Cemetery in Rush County, Indiana, following a service held in accordance with her Methodist faith at the Moster Mortuary attended by scores of mourners both black and white. Numerous eulogies were recited at the service, and six of her former high school classmates served as pallbearers.

== Initial investigation ==
Despite the known racist reputation of Martinsville and Jenkins's documented experiences of racial harassment and intimidation in the ninety minutes leading to her death, investigators rapidly discounted the theory her murder had been racially motivated—instead alluding to the theory her murder was most likely a random killing. (Note: A police spokesman would inform the media on September 21 that investigators had concluded no evidence existed "to indicate a racial motive" behind Jenkins's murder.) Police inquiries into Jenkins's background revealed she had no known enemies, and the fact she knew nobody in Martinsville—plus the fact her sales crew had opted to travel to the city as opposed to Vincennes in a last-minute decision—made any personal motive for her death unlikely. Furthermore, she had not been robbed or raped, thus enabling investigators to conclusively discount robbery as a motive for her death, although they could not discount the theory she may have died as the result of an attempted sexual assault.

An initial analysis of the crime scene and the circumstances surrounding Jenkins's death would lead Morgan County Deputy Sheriff Paul Mason to publicly state on September 17 that investigators believed Jenkins had been stabbed once by an individual who had most likely emerged "from behind [the] large evergreen bush" lining the section of East Morgan Street where she had been attacked before proceeding to stab her, and that the attack had occurred within eight minutes of Jenkins and Norma Neal parting company. Furthermore, a laceration upon Jenkins's chin may have been inflicted as she attempted to ward off her assailant.

Although investigators had little physical evidence to work with, numerous Martinsville residents did volunteer leads of inquiry—all of which were pursued by the Martinsville Police Department. (Note: Three detectives from the Indiana State Police were later assigned to assist the Martinsville Police Department in the investigation into Jenkins's murder.) On September 19, investigators announced that the two individuals in the Mercury Comet who had followed and taunted Jenkins had turned themselves in. These individuals, Stanley Shireman (23) and John Burns (21), were repeatedly interviewed by local and state investigators. Both young men admitted to following and taunting Jenkins, whom they claimed had been "acting strangely", but remained adamant they had done nothing else. In addition, both confirmed statements made by Donald Neal that a light-colored sedan had been parked close to their vehicle before they drove away from the Neal residence. Shireman and Burns were cleared of involvement when their alibis for the actual time of the murder were verified. Several other suspects—including thirteen individuals who falsely confessed to Jenkins's murder—were also detained and interrogated; all were released after passing polygraph tests and/or the verification of their alibis.

The license plate number Donald Neal had made a mental note of was also discounted as being accurate as the number was traced to a Martinsville farmer with a verifiable alibi for his whereabouts on the evening of the murder, although investigators did state the prefix Neal recorded—55-C—may have been accurate as this would indicate a vehicle driven by a Martinsville resident.

=== Cold case ===
Despite the contemporary police investigation and a combined public reward of $6,000 offered by the National Association for the Advancement of Colored People (NAACP) and P. F. Collier and Son for information leading to the arrest and conviction of Jenkins's killer, her murder remained unsolved and within six weeks of her death, the investigation had largely become cold, with many locals resenting the resultant media attention upon their city and portrayals of their being a redneck community. Nonetheless, the case was subject to periodic review.

In late October, the NAACP sent a telegram to United States Attorney General Ramsey Clark, formally requesting that he personally intervene in the investigation as they viewed Jenkins's murder as a violation of her civil rights, and contested that local authorities had been ineffective and/or indifferent in their investigation into her death. Weeks later, the United States Department of Justice announced their refusal to personally intervene in the investigation. This announcement was welcomed by local journalists, with the Martinsville Daily Reporter proclaiming: "The NAACP accuses Martinsville of being a hotbed of Klansmen. This may have been true 40 years ago, but the Klan has had very little luck in penetrating the Artesian city lately ... the NAACP had better go chase something else, for from our observation, even those who are ill-disposed toward Negroes want that murderer caught, whether he lives here or not."

== Renewed investigation ==
In June 2000, Jenkins's mother received an anonymous phone call from an individual who claimed to know the identity of her daughter's murderer. This individual also claimed more than one individual had been involved in her daughter's death—also divulging that Jenkins had been murdered with a screwdriver. She refused to elaborate further, stating: "I'm sorry. I have a family. I fear for my life." This anonymous lead was reported to the FBI, who in turn notified local authorities. The following month, Martinsville Police Chief Frans Hollanders issued a public appeal for the individual who had made this phone call to contact the Martinsville Police Department to disclose any information pertaining to the case she had, adding police were willing to maintain the caller's confidentiality.

Once I find out, then that will bring the family and me closure. We just want to know who done it and why ... I pray every night that something comes, maybe some new DNA test. Because, if they don't get some new concrete evidence, the guy is still going to be walking around free, in Martinsville or wherever he is.

— Paul Davis, describing his renewed hopes his stepdaughter's murderer(s) may be identified (2001).

Later the same year, Jenkins's stepfather hired a private investigator named William McAllister to pursue both this anonymous tip and other leads of inquiry. Shortly thereafter, McAllister informed Jenkins's stepfather that a prime suspect in his stepdaughter's murder—a construction worker unable to account for his whereabouts on the night of Jenkins's murder and previously reported to have been killed in an Illinois shooting—was still alive and residing in Florida.

In the early 2000s, the Indiana State Police announced the formation of a statewide investigative unit dedicated to solving cold cases. On September 29, 2000, the cold case unit assigned two veteran investigators named Maurice Allcron and Alan McElroy to re-investigate the murder. Over the course of twenty months, these investigators would interview over 150 witnesses and suspects and devote over 5,000 man hours to the renewed investigation. Although Paul Davis was initially skeptical of the cold case unit's sincerity in their pledge to solve his stepdaughter's murder, he gradually became convinced of their resolve, and authorized William McAllister to share his case files with the detectives in the fall of 2000. This investigative unit gradually ensured the cooperation of the suspect residing in Florida, who assisted in the renewed investigation in the interest of clearing his name.

== Later developments ==
=== Anonymous correspondence ===
In November 2001, the Martinsville Police Department received an anonymous handwritten letter naming Jenkins's murderer as Kenneth Clay Richmond, adding that Richmond's youngest daughter, Shirley, had witnessed the murder and had confessed to the author in approximately 1985 of having witnessed the murder "of a black woman" as a seven-year-old child. Upon being contacted by investigators the following month, Shirley Richmond McQueen confirmed the authenticity of the letter's contents, adding another man whose identity she did not know had also participated in the murder, although she insisted she had not initially known Jenkins had died as a result of the attack. McQueen also added she had been estranged from her father for twenty-four years, that her family did not live in Martinsville in 1968, and that they had simply been passing through the city on the date of the crime.

Both the anonymous phone call to Jenkins's mother in 2000 and the anonymous letter penned to the Martinsville Police Department in 2001 had been provided by 46-year-old Connie McQueen, Shirley McQueen's former sister-in-law and one of only two individuals to whom Shirley McQueen had ever confessed having witnessed Jenkins's murder. Although fearful for her own safety and the safety of her family, Connie McQueen had gradually felt compelled to anonymously notify Jenkins's relatives and authorities after learning of the reopening of the investigation into Jenkins's murder. The murder itself, while racially motivated, had ultimately been a crime of opportunity.

=== Eyewitness statement ===
To both police and, later, an investigative reporter, one of the initial verbal statements McQueen made upon being asked to recount the evening of Jenkins's murder was: "If the girl had a yellow scarf and was killed with a screwdriver, my Dad could be the killer."

Shirley McQueen confirmed that on the evening of the murder, her father and another man had been drinking on "a rainy night" and were simply driving through Martinsville en route to the family home as she sat in the back seat of the car. Her father had been driving the vehicle, while the other man, whom she described as a tall individual with black hair, had been in the passenger seat.

McQueen recalled her father had been the first to observe Jenkins; he had first wolf whistled at her before he and his passenger yelled several derogatory comments—almost certainly including racial slurs—at Jenkins as they specifically drove by her on several occasions. Her father had then pulled over to the sidewalk alongside Jenkins at a location close to what McQueen believed was a gas station. McQueen then observed her father grab a screwdriver as he and his passenger exited the vehicle. Jenkins had attempted to run as both men briefly chased her. Her father had then stabbed Jenkins once in the chest with the screwdriver as his accomplice held her hands behind her back. The two had then almost immediately returned to their vehicle and sped away from the scene.

According to McQueen, when her father and the unknown assailant had returned to the car, both were laughing, with her father remarking, "She got what she deserved." As they drove away, McQueen looked through the rear window of her father's car and saw Jenkins staggering along the sidewalk, then collapse alongside a bush. McQueen also recalled Jenkins had been wearing black framed glasses, had worn a bright yellow scarf, and had been carrying "a suitcase or box" at the time her father and his accomplice had first observed her.

McQueen later stated that, as they drove back home, her father had dropped his passenger off at an unknown address and she had then climbed into the passenger seat. Once home, he had given her seven dollars—one dollar for each year of her life—to keep her quiet about what she had witnessed, adding the attack was "our little secret".

=== Corroborative information ===
Richmond's daughter's account of events corroborated all known details of Jenkins's murder, including the color of an item of clothing that she had been wearing at the time of her murder which never had been revealed to the public: the color of her paisley scarf.

Although McQueen had been estranged from her father for twenty-four years by the time of her December 2001 statement, she met her father to purposely question him regarding her recollections of the murder in January 2002. McQueen later informed police her father denied killing Jenkins when confronted with her accusations before elaborating: "Everything is in the past. You should let the past go ... I can't change my past—it's over!"

== Arrest ==
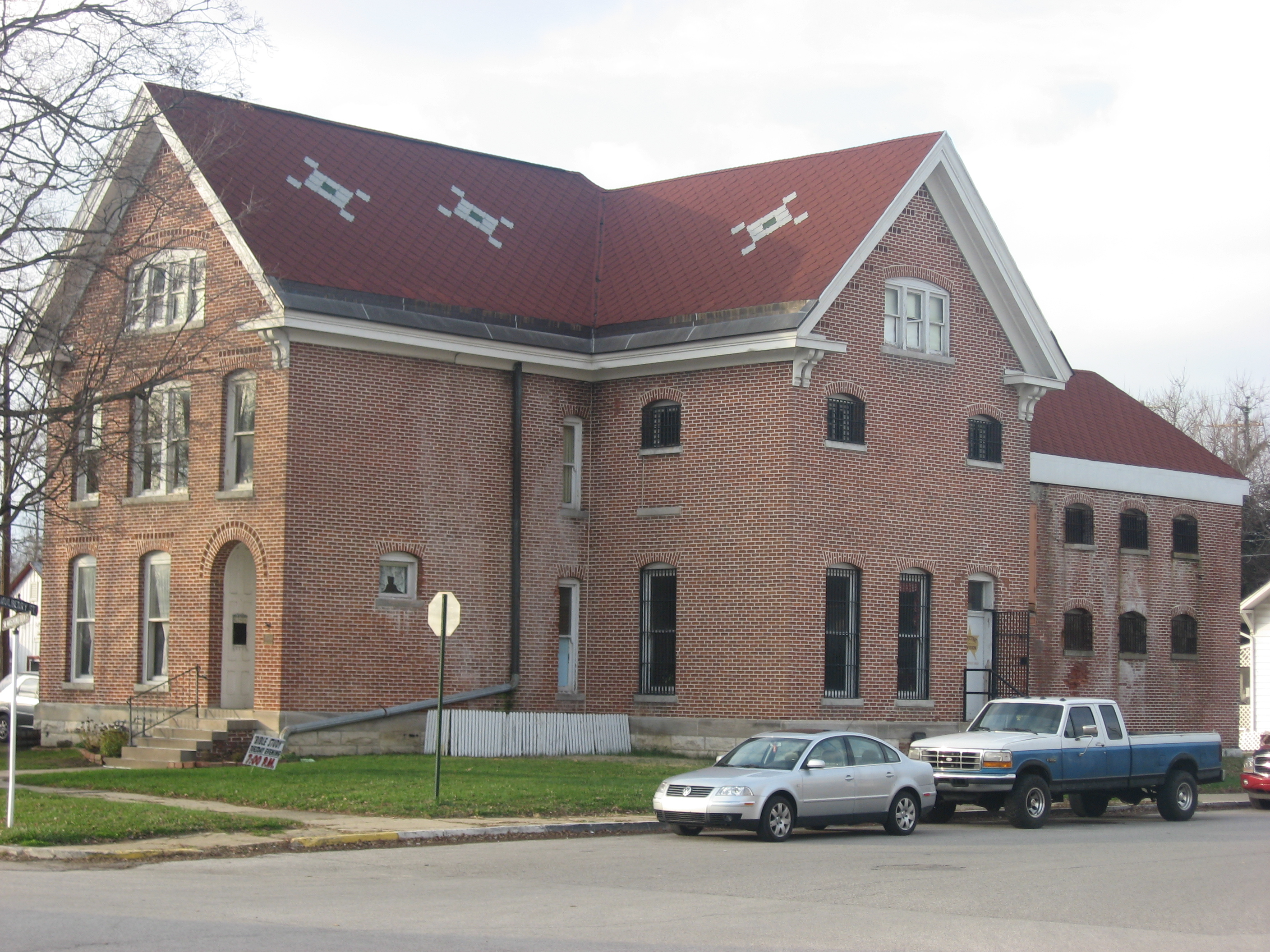
The Morgan County Sheriff's House and Jail. Richmond was remanded in custody at this location on May 8, 2002.

On May 8, 2002, police arrested Kenneth Richmond in an Indianapolis nursing home. His arrest was the first and only instance in which an individual had been detained and formally charged with Jenkins's murder. Approximately twelve of Jenkins's relatives were present at the Morgan Circuit Court to hear formal charges presented against Richmond on this date. A plea of innocent was entered on his behalf. He was remanded in custody at the Morgan County Sheriff's House and Jail without bond, to await trial.

News of Richmond having been arrested and charged with Jenkins's murder–plus the knowledge he was not a resident of Martinsville–was welcomed by local residents, who had resented the tarnishing brought upon their city as being a place where racism thrived as a result of the crime, with one local remarking to statewide media: "[The murder] dropped a cloud over the whole town ... and that poor child was only trying to make a living." A former suspect in Jenkins's murder would also remark to a Herald-Times reporter: "I don't see how [Richmond] lived with it all these years. I would like to thank the little girl who turned her daddy in. He ruined a lot of lives—not just the Jenkins's."

=== Perpetrator's background ===
Richmond had been born in Barren County, Kentucky on February 21, 1932, one of six children born to Henry Clay and Annie (née Doolin) Richmond. He had been 36 years old and the father of four daughters at the time of Jenkins's murder, and was a 70 year old great-grandfather at the time of his arrest. A career criminal with an extensive history of violence, domestic violence, alcoholism and bizarre behavior including a fixation with self-castration, (Note: Due to his frequent outbursts of violence, including domestic violence, Richmond believed castrating himself would "tame" his temperament. He successfully castrated himself in 1982.) Richmond had also been an avowed racist with known affiliations with extremist groups such as the Ku Klux Klan. Richmond had previously been charged with both murder and attempted murder in cases unrelated to the Jenkins slaying, but had been found not guilty in each case.

At the time of Jenkins's murder, Richmond had lived with his family on a nearby Hendricks County farm and, according to his daughter, was simply passing through Martinsville on the night Jenkins was murdered when he and another individual in his car had first observed her.

== Aftermath ==
Richmond was never brought to trial for Jenkins's murder. Although charged with first-degree murder in May 2002 and subsequent pretrial motions such as requests for a change of venue were subsequently held, he was later declared incompetent to stand trial due to the advancing decline of his health. Two weeks after this formal ruling, on August 31, 2002, he died of bladder cancer at the age of 70, having reportedly confessed to Jenkins's murder on his deathbed. His alleged accomplice was never identified.

Tell me where do the black people stand? In my words, they don't .. knowing Carol, the way we knew her, there could be no other reason [beyond racial prejudice] for her murder .. Let's not have another tragic experience like the one that happened in Martinsville last week. Put some strength in 'We the People' by giving them an opportunity to work in their community as well as yours.

— Conclusion of a letter penned by Paula Norene Bradley and fellow Philco employee Pamela Morton, as quoted in the readers' section of the Rushville Daily Republican, September 25, 1968

Within days of Jenkins's murder, several Martinsville locals—incensed at having discovered Donald and Norma Neal had provided assistance to Jenkins and were actively assisting police with their inquiries to locate the murderer(s)—began subjecting the newlyweds to harassment and death threats in addition to referring to the couple as nigger lovers. The harassment to which the couple were subjected became so extreme that Donald Neal's father began sitting on the couple's porch at night armed with a shotgun as his son and daughter-in-law slept. The couple eventually relocated from the city.

On September 25, 1968, Jenkins's sales colleague and friend Paula Norene Bradley and another black employee of the Connersville Ford Motor Company also temporarily unemployed due to the contemporary union strike penned a letter to a local periodical in which they lamented Jenkins's murder, stating: "How will this dreadful murder affect us? Remembering [that] all we wanted was an honest living to help our families and our community."

Donald Neal died of bone marrow cancer in November 2020 at the age of 70. In the years prior to his death, he and his wife had campaigned for a permanent memorial to be erected in Martinsville in Jenkins's honor.

Jenkins's stepfather, Paul Davis, died of natural causes on April 13, 2018, at the age of 90.

In an effort to bring comfort to Jenkins's family and erase the common perception of Martinsville remaining a largely racist city, community leaders formally apologized to Jenkins's family in 2017. That November, members of her family were joined by approximately 150 locals gathered inside Martinsville City Hall, where they observed prayer prior to Mayor Shannon Kohn dedicating a memorial stone in her honor within the garden at the entrance to the building. This dedication followed a service to honor Jenkins's life, and also saw a maple tree planted in the gardens of the city hall. An inscription on this stone reads: "Carol's life had enormous value and promise. The Rushville and Martinsville communities have joined together to honor Carol and recognize her family's love."

A community park in Rushville, Indiana was also rededicated in Jenkins's name on November 1, 2017. Officially renamed the Carol Jenkins-Davis Community Park, the park is located in eastern Rushville.

== Media ==
=== Bibliography ===
- Chapman, Carol (2011). The Girl in the Yellow Scarf: One of Indiana's Most Notorious Cold Case Murders Solved as a Town Tries to Leave Behind Its Past. Prince Media Group, LLC. ISBN 978-0-615-60705-4.
- Kitty, Alexandra (2023). Murder in a Sundown Town. Genius Book Publishing. ISBN 978-1-958-72717-1.

=== Television ===
- Injustice Files: Sundown Towns. Presented by Keith Beauchamp, this 44-minute documentary was initially broadcast on February 24, 2014. Jenkins's parents and several of her siblings are among those interviewed for this documentary.
- The Girl in the Yellow Scarf. Directed by Sandra Chapman, this 58-minute documentary premiered on September 21, 2023. Donald and Norma Neal are among those interviewed within this documentary.

== See also ==
- African Americans in Indiana
- Cold case
- Crime in Indiana
- Crime of opportunity – Crime committed without planning
- Domestic terrorism in the United States
- NAACP – American civil rights organization
- Racial segregation in the United States
- Racial violence in the United States
- Racism against Black Americans
- Racism in the United States
- Sundown town – All-white municipalities that practice a form of racial segregation
- Timeline of the civil rights movement

== Cited works and further reading ==
- Bones, Autumn (2022). Unsolved Indiana: Murder Mysteries, Bizarre Deaths & Unexplained Disappearances. History Press. ISBN 978-1-439-67637-0.
- Collins, Edward (2020). Cold Cases of Indiana: The Most Disturbing Unsolved Mysteries in Indiana. KDP Print. ISBN 979-8-692-46746-1.
- Holmes, Ronald M.; Holmes, Stephen T. (2002). Profiling Violent Crimes: An Investigative Tool. Sage Publications. ISBN 978-0-761-92594-1.
- Johnson, Neville L. (2003). The John Wooden Pyramid of Success. Cool Titles Books. ISBN 978-0-967-39202-8.
- Loewen, James W. (2018). Sundown Towns: A Hidden Dimension of American Racism. Genius Book Publishing. ISBN 978-1-620-97454-4.
- Nash, Jay Robert (1983). Open Files: A Narrative Encyclopedia of the World's Greatest Unsolved Crimes. M. Evans. ISBN 978-0-070-45907-6.
- Newton, Michael (2004). The Encyclopedia of Unsolved Crimes. Facts on File. ISBN 978-0-8160-7818-9.
- Newton, Michael (2016). Unsolved Civil Rights Murder Cases, 1934-1970. McFarland & Company Incorporated. ISBN 978-0-786-49895-6.
- Pettem, Silvia (2013). Cold Case Research: Resources for Unidentified, Missing, and Cold Homicide Cases. CRC Press. ISBN 978-1-466-57053-5.
- Remnick, David; Ross, Harold Wallace; Brown, Tina (2001). "Who Killed Carol Jenkins?". The New Yorker. 77. F-R Publishing Corporation. ISSN 2163-3827.
- Rhyant, Lee E.; Lewis, Catherine M. (2022). Soaring: Eleven Guiding Principles on the Path from Segregation to Success. University of Georgia Press. ISBN 978-0-820-36864-1.
- Robbins, Coy D. (1991). African Heritage in Morgan County, Indiana. Indiana University. ISBN 978-0-788-40017-9.
- Stoner, Andrew E. (2007). Notorious 92: Indiana's Most Heinous Murders in All 92 Counties. Rooftop Publishing. ISBN 978-1-600-08024-1.
- Thomas, Joan (2002). "The Pugilist of Morgan County". Indianapolis Monthly. 26. Hour Media Group. ISSN 0899-0328.
- Wade, Wyn Craig (1998). The Fiery Cross: The Ku Klux Klan in America. Oxford University Press. ISBN 978-0-19-512357-9.
