= Carol Spradling =

American computer scientist

Professor Carol Spradling
- Born: 1950 (age 75–76)
- Education: University of Nebraska–Lincoln
- Scientific career
- Fields: Computer Science; Instructional Technology
- Workplaces: Northwest Missouri State University

Carol Spradling is an American professor, computer scientist who served as the first Director of the School of Computer Science and Information Systems at Northwest Missouri State University in Maryville, Missouri. She is known for her work with computer ethics, profession-based education, interactive media, and expanding the involvement of underrepresented groups and women in computing. Dr. Spradling taught computer science courses and served as a provost fellow and a liaison to the Northland Center For Advanced Professional Studies program. Spradling served on the Missouri Department of Higher Education Panel on The Role of Faculty in Establishing and Implementing a Blueprint for Missouri Higher Education.

Spradling is the co-founder of the Missouri Iowa Nebraska Kansas Women in Computing Conference, a regional meeting that coincides and is modeled after the Grace Hopper Celebration of Women in Computing. Started in 2011 and held biannually, the conference gathers students, faculty, and technology leaders as part of a nationwide effort to address the decline of women in the computer science professions and discuss strategies for improving representation in the field from underrepresented groups. She is active in the National Center for Women & Information Technology Academic Alliance.

She is the recipient of the 2012 Missouri Governor's Award for Excellence in Education and received the Dean's Faculty Award for Service in 2014.

== Selected publications ==
- 2014. Using interdisciplinary teams to develop comprehensive integrated digital marketing communication campaigns, Journal of Computing Sciences in Colleges, 29(5), Pages 208–218.
- 2013. Computer science curriculum 2013: social and professional recommendations from the ACM/IEEE-CS task force, Proceedings of the 44th ACM technical symposium on Computer science education.
- 2012. Proposed revisions to the social and professional knowledge area for CS2013, Proceedings of the 43rd ACM technical symposium on Computer Science Education.
- 2009. A comprehensive survey on the status of social and professional issues in United States undergraduate computer science programs and recommendations., Computer science education, 19.3, Pages 137–153.
- 2009. From the man on the moon to 2001 and beyond: the evolving social and ethical impact of computers a session to commemorate SIGCSE' 40 anniversary, Proceedings of the 40th ACM technical symposium on Computer science education, Volume 41, Issue 1.
- 2008. Ethics training and decision-making: do computer science programs need help?, ACM SIGCSE Bulletin 40.1, Pages 153–157.
- 2008. Examining the data on computer ethics in the classroom, ACM SIGCAS Computers and Society: Volume 38 Issue 2.
- 2008. An interdisciplinary major emphasizing multimedia, ACM SIGCSE Proceedings of the 39th SIGCSE technical symposium on Computer science education, Pages 388–391.
- 2007. A study of social and professional ethics in undergraduate computer science programs: Faculty perspectives , ETD collection for University of Nebraska–Lincoln.Paper AAI3255458.

== See also ==
- Association for Computing Machinery's Council on Women in Computing (ACM-W)
- Governance in higher education
