= Steve Spratt =

American politician (born 1950)

Member of the New Hampshire House of Representatives from the 4th Hillsborough district
- In office December 5, 2012 – December 3, 2014
- Preceded by: Jennifer Daler
- Succeeded by: Carol R. Roberts

Member of the New Hampshire House of Representatives from the 3rd Hillsborough district
- In office December 6, 2006 – December 3, 2008
- Preceded by: Donald Carlson
- Succeeded by: Peter Leishman

Personal details
- Born: October 3, 1950 (age 76) Warwick, Rhode Island, U.S.
- Party: Democratic
- Spouse: Debra Adams
- Education: Providence College (BA)

Stephen P. Spratt (born October 3, 1950) is an American politician who served two non-consecutive terms as a Democratic member of the New Hampshire House of Representatives. After first being elected in 2006, he decided to challenge Peter Bragdon in 2008 for the state's 11th district senate seat rather than run for reelection. He ran again successfully for the House in 2012 and was named an assistant majority leader by Speaker Terie Norelli.
