= Active Worlds =

Virtual world launched in 1995

- SW City, one of the largest areas in Active Worlds
- Developer(s): ActiveWorlds, Inc.
- Initial release: June 28, 1995; 29 years ago
- Stable release: 8.2 / May 5, 2023; 22 months ago
- Engine: RenderWare
- Operating system: Browser: Windows (8.1 or later); OS X (10.8 or later); Linux (through Wine 4.0 or later); World Server; Windows
- Available in: 15 languages
- List of languages Chinese, Danish, English, Finnish, French, German, Hungarian, Italian, Japanese, Korean, Norwegian, Portuguese, Russian, Spanish, Swedish
- Website: www.activeworlds.com

Active Worlds is an online virtual world, developed by ActiveWorlds Inc., a company based in Newburyport, Massachusetts, and launched on June 28, 1995. Users assign themselves a name, log into the Active Worlds universe, and explore 3D virtual worlds and environments that others have built. Active Worlds allows users to own worlds and universes, and develop custom 3D content. The browser has web browsing capabilities, as well as voice chat, and basic instant messaging features.

== History ==
In the summer of 1994, Ron Britvich created WebWorld, the first 2.5D world where tens of thousands could chat, build and travel. WebWorld operated on the Peregrine Systems Inc. servers as an after-hours project until Britvich left the company to join Knowledge Adventure Worlds (KAW) in the fall of that year. In February 1995, KAW spun off their 3D Web division to form the company Worlds Inc. Britvich was eventually joined by several other developers, and the renamed AlphaWorld continued to develop as a skunkworks project at Worlds Inc, internally competing with a similar project known internally as Gamma and publicly as Worlds Chat. While AlphaWorld was developing a strong cult following due in large part to Britvich's open philosophy of favoring user-built content, Worlds, Inc. favored Gamma for the company produced contract projects for Disney and others.

In June 1995, AlphaWorld was renamed Active Worlds (from Active Worlds Explorer) and officially launched as version 1.0. Around this time, Circle of Fire (CoF) was formed to create content for the Active Worlds universe. This company played a pivotal role in the future of the product. In January 1997, Worlds Inc., after failing to secure needed contracts and having spent its venture investment of over 15 million dollars, laid off almost the entire staff of the company, keeping only several employees which included the author of Gamma, now known as WorldsPlayer. Active Worlds, never considered much of an asset by the company, became an object of struggle for those close to it. Circle of Fire (COF) run by Richard Noll purchased all of the assets of Active Worlds and hired many of the Active Worlds developers. JP McCormick joined the company shortly thereafter and invested funds in COF to continue the expansion of Active Worlds.

In January 1999, COF performed a reverse merger with Vanguard Enterprises, Inc., and changed the company's name to Activeworlds.com, Inc. and became a publicly traded company on Nasdaq under the symbol AWLD. In 2001, the company launched a new product called 3D Homepages. Each citizen account was entitled to a free 30-day trial of a virtual 10,000 square-meter 3D world, using their choice of layout from a selection of pre-designed styles. After the trial, the user had the option of upgrading to a larger size and user limit. These 3D Homepages were hosted for the user, unlike traditional worlds where the user would have to get their world hosted by another company or user, or themselves.

In 2002, the company increased the price of their yearly citizenships from US$19.95 to US$69.95. In June 2008, Active Worlds, Inc. released the first major update to the browser in two years, version 4.2. It included web page rendering on objects and customizable avatars. In June 2009, Active Worlds, Inc. released an open beta of version 5.0 to the public. In June 2012, version 6.0 was released. The system's registration fee was removed in 2013.

In March 2016, the platform made headlines when YouTuber and Twitch streamer Vinny of the streaming group Vinesauce explored and came across a user by the name of "Hitomi Fujiko", who he assumed to be a non-player character, but who clearly showed signs of life as the stream continued. The stream was viewed by roughly 6,000 people, and caused the platform's login servers to crash due to an overload of registrations. As a result, no viewers were able to log in during the stream. The incident, described as creepypasta-like, led to speculation that the character was part of an ARG, and restored interest in the virtual world. It was later revealed that Fujiko was a viewer of Vinny's streams and a former frequenter of Active Worlds who had decided to revisit the game during Vinny's own playthrough of it as a means of entertaining herself; she later participated in a question & answer session revolving around the incident on the Vinesauce subreddit under the pseudonym "Pocketomi".

== See also ==
- Virtual world
- Metaverse
- Croquet project
- Renderware — rendering engine used by Active Worlds
- CyberTown
- Second Life
- Snow Crash — novel by Neal Stephenson which inspired Active Worlds
- The Thirteenth Floor — film which has a simulated environment game within Active Worlds
- WorldsAway — Active Worlds precursor
- Worlds.com

== Sources ==
- Hansen, Kenneth. "The Design of Public Space in 3D Virtual Worlds on the Internet". Virtual Space: Spatiality in Virtual Inhabited 3d Worlds. Lars Qvortrup, ed. London: Springer-Verlag, 2002.
- Noll, Rick. "Price Plan Letter". Retrieved September 4, 2007.
- Scannell, Beth. Life on the Border: Cyberspace and the Frontier in Historical Perspective. Online edition. Retrieved September 4, 2007.
