= Murder in Indiana law =

Aspect of Indiana criminal law

Murder in Indiana law constitutes the intentional killing, under circumstances defined by law, of people within or under the jurisdiction of the U.S. state of Indiana.

The United States Centers for Disease Control and Prevention reported that in the year 2021, the state had a murder rate somewhat above the median for the entire country.

== Definition ==
Indiana has four homicide statutes in total, with murder being the most serious offense. Murder is defined in Indiana as either the intentional killing of another person without justification, or causing the death of someone while committing or attempting to commit a violent felony, regardless of intent to kill (the felony murder rule). Murder is punished by either 45 to 60 years in prison, life imprisonment without the possibility of parole, or the death penalty if at least one aggravating circumstance is proven, and that aggravating circumstance outweighs any mitigating circumstances potentially present. The aggravating circumstances that can warrant a possible death sentence in Indiana are:

- The murder was intentional and committed in the course of committing arson, burglary, child molestation, sexual assault, kidnapping, rape, robbery, carjacking, organized crime, dealing cocaine or other narcotics, or in criminal confinement
- Detonation of an explosive with the intent to cause injury or damages and resulting in death
- Lying in wait to commit murder
- Hiring or being hired to kill another person
- Murder of an officer or others working in an official capacity while the individual is on duty or in retribution for an action performed in the course of duty
- A previous conviction for murder
- Commission of a previous murder, even if not convicted
- Murder committed while in custody, on probation, or on parole
- Murder with dismemberment of the victim
- Mutilation, torture, decapitation, or burning of the victim while still alive
- Murder of a victim under the age of 12
- Murder involving felony battery, kidnapping, criminal confinement, or sexual abuse of the victim
- Murder of a witness against the defendant to prevent testimony
- Murder that results from intentionally firing a weapon into a dwelling or from a vehicle
- Murder of a pregnant victim with intention to kill a viable fetus
- Murder committed on the grounds of an educational institution
- Murder committed in a place of worship

== Penalties ==
The sentences for homicide offenses in Indiana are listed below.

Offense	Mandatory sentence
Reckless homicide	1 to 6 years in prison
Involuntary manslaughter	1 to 6 years in prison
Voluntary manslaughter	10 to 30 years in prison
Murder	Death or; Life imprisonment with or without the possibility of parole or; 45 to 65 years in prison
