= Cell Death & Differentiation =

- Discipline: cell death
- Language: English
- Edited by: Gerry Melino and Tak W Mak

Publication details
- History: 2002–present
- Publisher: Springer Nature
- Frequency: Monthly
- Open access: Hybrid
- Impact factor: 13.7 (2023)

Standard abbreviations
- ISO 4: Cell Death Differ.

Indexing
- ISSN: 1350-9047 (print); 1476-5403 (web)

Links
- Journal homepage

Cell Death & Differentiation is a peer-reviewed academic journal published by Springer Nature.

== Abstracted in ==
- BIOBASE/Current Awareness in Biological Sciences
- Biochemistry and Biophysics Citation Index
- Chemical Abstracts
- Current Contents
- Current Contents/Life Sciences
- EMBASE/Excerpta Medica
- MEDLINE/Index Medicus
- Science Citation Index
