= Morgan County Sheriff's House and Jail =

Historic government buildings in Indiana, United States

- U.S. National Register of Historic Places
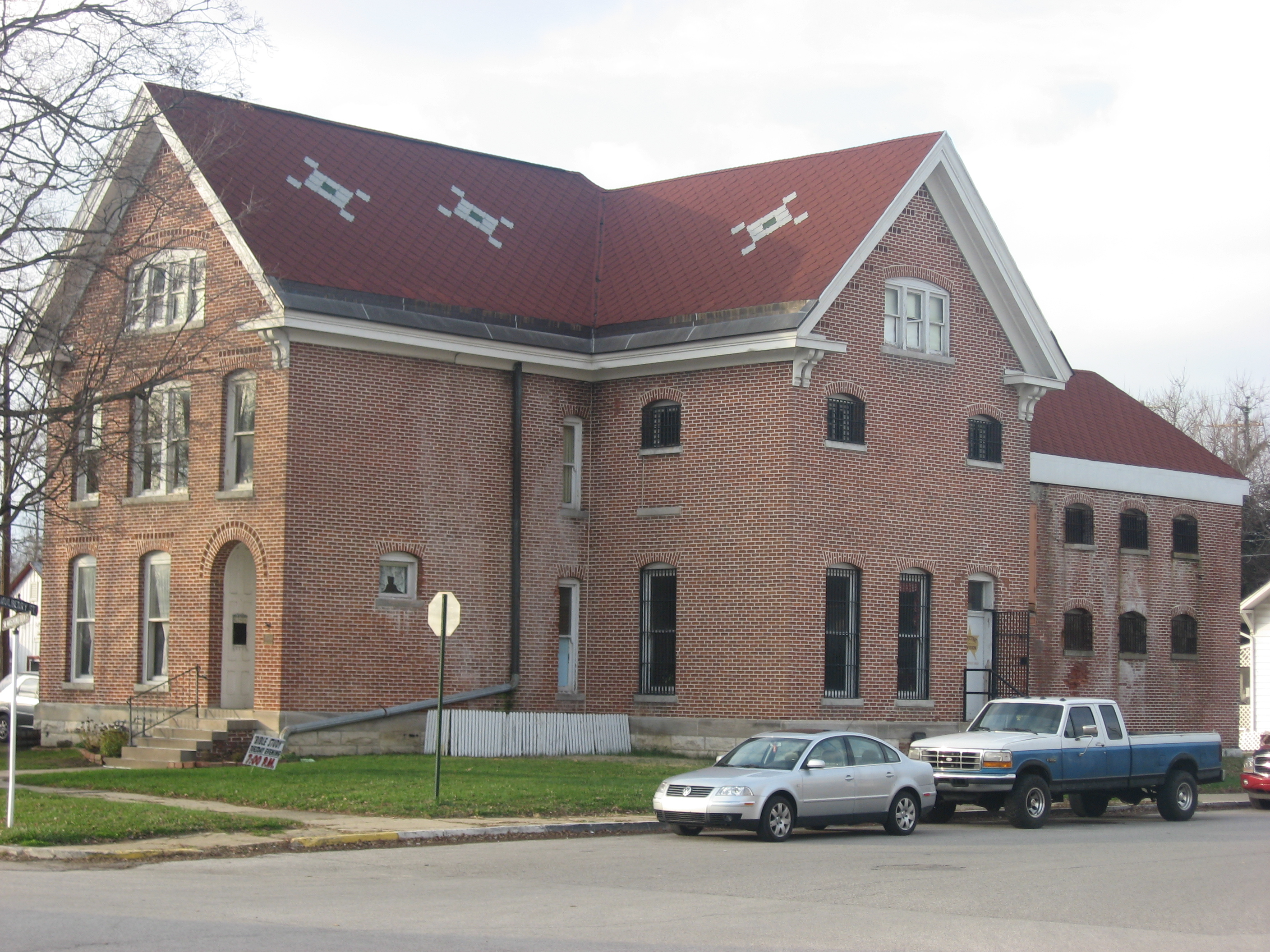
- Morgan County Sheriff's House and Jail, December 2011

- Location within Indiana Location within the United States
- Location: 110 W. Washington St., Martinsville, Indiana
- Coordinates: 39°25′38″N 86°25′49″W
- Area: less than one acre
- Built: 1890
- Built by: Turner, T.J.
- Architectural style: Italianate, Queen Anne
- NRHP reference No.: 96000602
- Added to NRHP: May 30, 1996

Morgan County Sheriff's House and Jail is a historic combined jail and residence located at Martinsville, Indiana. It was built in 1890, and is a two-story, brick building with Italianate and Queen Anne style design elements. It has a cross-gable roof, arched openings, and terra cotta ornamentation.

It was listed on the National Register of Historic Places in 1996.
