= Carol O'Sullivan =

Irish translation scholar

Carol O'Sullivan is an Irish-born translation scholar, focusing on audiovisual translation. She has carried out pioneering work in, above all, the history of subtitling She is currently working at the University of Bristol, where she was the director of Translation Studies in the School of Modern Languages for some years, and convened the postgraduate translation programmes.

== Biography ==
O'Sullivan got her bachelor's degree at Trinity College Dublin and subsequently got her master's and PhD at Cambridge University. Between 2004 and 2013 she was active at the University of Portsmouth and since 2013, she has been employed by the University of Bristol, where she is director of Translation Studies in the School of Modern Languages, where she convenes the postgraduate translation programmes. From 2012 to 2017 she worked with Valerie Henitiuk as associate editor of the Routledge journal Translation Studies, of which she was editor from 2017 to 2019.

== Research ==
O 'Sullivan's main research interests are audiovisual translation, translation history and literary translation. She has primarily been active in audiovisual translation and she has had a great influence with monographs such as Translating Popular Film (2011) which looks at multilingualism in film and the many ways in which film and translation engage with each other. O'Sullivan's main impact has been in the previously relatively unexplored field of history of subtitling, where she has published several studies. Perhaps her most important contribution has been the anthology The Translation of Films 1900-1950, which she co-edited with Jean-François Cornu. In the anthology, more than a dozen authors describe how film translation emerged during the silent era and in the early decades of sound.

== Selected publications ==
O’Sullivan, Carol. 2011. Translating Popular Film. London: Palgrave MacMillan

O’Sullivan, Carol. 2016. “Imagined spectators: the importance of policy for audiovisual research”. In Target. 28:2. (2016). Pp. 261 –275.

O’Sullivan, Carol and Jean-Francois Cornu. (Red.). 2019a. The translation of films, 1900-1950. Oxford: OUP.

O’Sullivan, Carol & Jean-Francois Cornu. 2019b. “History of audiovisual translation”. In Pérez-González, Luis (ed.). The Routledge Handbook of Audiovisual Translation. London & New York: Routledge.
