= Carol A. Gotway Crawford =

American mathematical statistician

Carol Anne Gotway Crawford
- Born: 1961 (age 64–65)
- Education: Bradley University; Iowa State University
- Scientific career
- Fields: Mathematics statistics
- Workplaces: University of Nebraska–Lincoln; Emory University

Carol Anne Gotway Crawford is an American mathematical statistician and from 2018 to 2020 served as Chief Statistician of the U.S. Government Accountability Office (GAO). She joined the GAO in May 2017. From August 2014 to April 2017, she was with the Department of Agriculture's National Agricultural Statistics Service. She was formerly at the National Center for Environmental Health of the Centers for Disease Control and Prevention. She also holds an adjunct faculty position at the Rollins School of Public Health of Emory University, and is an expert in biostatistics, spatial analysis, environmental statistics, and the statistics of public health. She also maintains an interest in geoscience and has held executive roles in the International Association for Mathematical Geosciences.

Carol Anne Gotway did her undergraduate studies at Bradley University and her graduate studies in statistics at Iowa State University, earning a master's degree in 1986 and completing her Ph.D. in 1989. Her dissertation, supervised by Noel Cressie, was Inference from Spatial Processes. After an internship at RAND Corporation and postdoctoral studies at the Centre de Géostatistique of the École Nationale Supérieure des Mines de Paris in Fontainebleau, France, she became a researcher at Sandia National Laboratories. She moved to the Department of Biometry at the University of Nebraska–Lincoln in 1992, and moved again to the Centers for Disease Control in 1996. In 2008, she became associate director for science at the Centers for Disease Control.

As Carol A. Gotway, she is the author of the books Applied Spatial Statistics for Public Health Data (with Lance A. Waller, Wiley, 2004) and Statistical Methods for Spatial Data Analysis (with Oliver Schabenberger, Chapman & Hall/CRC, 2005).

In 1999, the Section on Statistics and the Environment of the American Statistical Association gave Gotway Crawford their Distinguished Achievement Medal. In 2002, Gotway Crawford was elected as a Fellow of the American Statistical Association. She is also an elected member of the International Statistical Institute. In 2009, she was given the LAS Distinguished Alumnus Award of Bradley University. In 2018, she received the Jeanne E. Griffith Mentoring Award from the American Statistical Association.
