= Carol Summers =

American printmaker, educator (1925–2016)

- Born: December 26, 1925; Kingston, New York, U.S.
- Died: October 27, 2016 (aged 90); Santa Cruz, California, U.S.
- Education: Bard College (BA)
- Known for: Printmaker, educator

Carol Summers (December 26, 1925 – October 27, 2016) was an American printmaker and educator, known for creating works by woodcut process.

== Early life and education ==
Carol Summers was born in 1925 in Kingston, New York.

He received a Bachelor of Arts degree in 1951 from Bard College in Annandale-on-Hudson, New York, studying with Stefan Hirsch and Louis Schanker.

== Career ==
Summers created his prints through a process he developed in the 1950s that became known in as the "Carol Summers technique": soaking large blocks of wood in ink, he placed them in patterns on one side of a piece of paper in order to, as one reviewer described his work, "give beautiful, blurry, shapes to the other side. The results are simple, decorative and uniquely vibrant."

In 1955, he was awarded the Louis Comfort Tiffany Foundation Fellowship; and in 1959, the John Simon Guggenheim Foundation Fellowship.

Summers had a 50 year retrospective in 1999 at the Santa Cruz Museum of Art and History in Santa Cruz, California.

=== Teaching career ===
In addition to his art, Summers had a career as a teacher, serving as an instructor at Hunter College, the Brooklyn Museum School, Pratt Graphics Center, and Columbia University.

== Collections ==
His work is part of the collection of the Tate in London; the Scottish National Gallery in Edinburgh; Smithsonian American Art Museum in Washington, D.C.; the National Gallery of Art in Washington, D.C.; the Art Institute of Chicago; the Madison Museum of Contemporary Art in Madison, Wisconsin; the Buffalo AKG Art Museum in Buffalo, New York; the Brooklyn Museum; the Whitney Museum of American Art in New York City; and the Museum of Modern Art (MoMA) in New York City.

== Personal life ==
He was a resident of Bonny Doon, California, and later Santa Cruz, California.

Summers died at the age of 90 on October 27, 2016, in his home in Santa Cruz.
