= Walter Thiele =

German inventor (born 1921)

Walter Thiele (born 16 February 1921) is a German inventor. He is credited with over 1600 inventions. He became a millionaire with his invention of the Lachsack ("Laugh in a Bag").

== Life and career ==
In the mid-1960s, the Wienerwald restaurant chain had artificial parrots developed for advertising, which croaked "today the kitchen stays cold, we go to the Wienerwald". The inventor of this parrot was Walter Thiele, who had inserted a battery-powered miniature record player in the parrot. Soon, however, Wienerwald boss Friedrich Jahn did not like the parrots and rejected them.

Thiele's attempts to offer his parrots at inventor's fairs also failed. When nobody at the 1968 Brussels Inventors' Fair was interested he tore open the parrot in frustration and put the record player in an old sock with a record of laughter. The people suddenly found that funny. In order to perfect this thing, which he called a "lachsock", Thiele organised a contest to invited people to have their laugh recorded, in order to find the most suitable laugh for his invention. The winner was a tax official from Nuremberg, and his laughter was featured on the small record that was played inside the laughsack. He was offered either an immediate payment of 1000 marks or 10 pfennigs a bag sold. The official preferred a sure thing and took the lump sum. Initially, the idea did not catch on in Germany. The inventor had to make a detour through foreign countries and applied for a patent in Japan. Therefore the Lachsack only came on the market in Germany a few years later. More than 120 million Lachsacks have been sold since 1968. Later Thiele invented the "Berlin Air in a Can". For 2500 euros he sold the rights for the "PannenRoller" (a substitute for a spare tire).

At age 75, he publicly and globally announced he was seeking a man who would, in the event of his death, marry his 46 years younger wife and share in his fortune.
