= Carol F. Henry =

American philanthropist from California

- Born: Baltimore, Maryland
- Education: Stanford University
- Occupation: Philanthropist
- Spouse: Warner W. Henry
- Children: 3

Carol F. Henry is an American philanthropist from California. She is one of the founders of the Los Angeles Opera, and has served as its president since 2005.

== Early life ==
Carol F. Henry was born in Baltimore, Maryland. She grew up in Sacramento, California. Henry graduated from Stanford University in 1961 and went on to receive a master's degree in Education from the same institution a year later, in 1962.

== Career ==
Henry taught in public schools in Manhattan Beach, California from 1962 to 1966. She has served on the board of directors of the Henry Wine Group since 1970.

== Philanthropy ==
She initially volunteered for the Junior League of Los Angeles. She then went on to serve on the boards of trustees of the KCET Women's Council, the National Council on Alcoholism, the Cate School, Teach For America, the Pasadena Art Alliance, and the Art Center College of Design. She currently serves on the boards of trustees of the University of Southern California Thornton School of Music.

Henry is one of the founders of the Los Angeles Opera. Indeed, she began volunteering for the Los Angeles Opera League in 1981. She has also served on its board since its founding in 1985. She has served as its president, or chairman of the executive committee, since 2005. Additionally, she serves on the board of Opera America.

== Personal life ==
She married Warner W. Henry, the founder of the Henry Wine Group, in 1966. The couple has three children. She resides in Pasadena, California.
