= Carol Johnson =

Carol Johnson may refer to:

- Carol Johnson (British politician) (1903–2000), British Labour politician
- Carol Johnson (South African politician) (born c. 1971), Western Cape politician
- Carol C. Johnson (born 1941), Minnesota politician
- Carol R. Johnson (1929–2020), American landscape architect and educator
- Carol Johnson (academic), Australian emerita professor at the University of Adelaide
- Carolyn "Carol" Johnson, a member of the American girl group The Exciters
- Carol Johnson, a character in the 2007 film 88 Minutes

== See also ==
- Carole Johnson (disambiguation)
- Carol Johnston (1958–2019), American gymnast
