= Midori Kono Thiel =

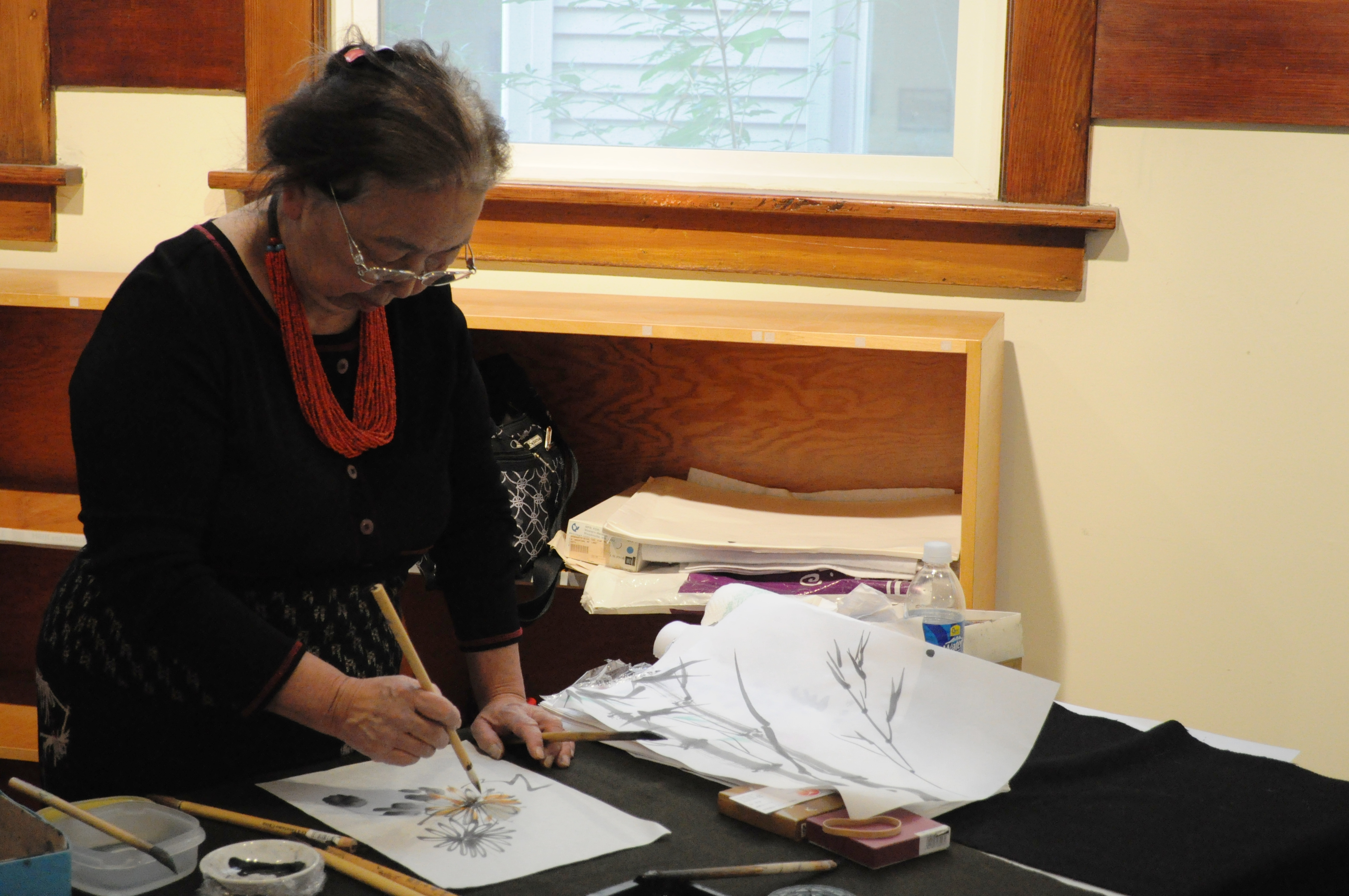
- Midori Kono Thiel making sumi-e painting at Bunka No Hi at Seattle's Nihon Go Gakko / Japanese Cultural & Community Center (Photo from 2009)
- Born: June 7, 1933 (age 93); Berkeley, California
- Education: University of California, Berkeley
- Website: www.mission-base.com/midori/

Midori Kono Thiel (born June 7, 1933 in Berkeley, California) is a Japanese American calligrapher based in Seattle. She grew up on Maui. She received her bachelor of arts and master of fine arts from the University of California, Berkeley. She has exhibited at the De Young Museum, San Francisco; Tokyo Metropolitan Art Museum; Seattle Art Museum; Portland Art Museum; Henry Art Gallery, Seattle; Cheney Cowles Art Museum, Spokane; and the Wing Luke Museum of the Asian Pacific American Experience, Seattle.

A 2015 exhibit at the Wing Luke Museum featured Kono's painting and calligraphy in combination with her daughter Tamiko's augmented reality art.

== Bibliography and other works ==
- Thiel, Midori Kono (2002). "Japanese Americans in the Pacific Northwest". In Titon, Jeff Todd; Carlin, Bob (eds.). American musical traditions. Vol. 5 Latino American and Asian American music. New York, NY: Schirmer Reference. pp. 94–95. ISBN 9780028655888. LCCN 2001042050. OCLC 619654085, 249182979.
- Thiel, Midori Kono (1984). Japan--ancient and modern. Vol. 4 Japanese dance performance. Seattle, WA: South Seattle Community College. OCLC 43041267.
