= Carol Owens =

Carol Owens may refer to:

- Carol Owens (basketball) (born 1967), American basketball coach
- Carol Owens (squash player) (born 1971), New Zealand-based squash player
- Carol Owens (politician) (1931–2012), Wisconsin legislator and dairy farmer
- Carol Owens, songwriter, see Jimmy and Carol Owens
