= Carol J. Thiele =

American microbiologist

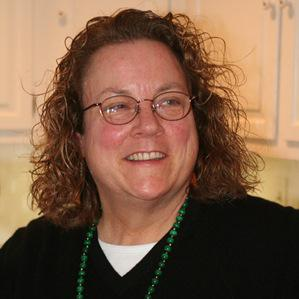
- Born: Carol Jeanne Thiele
- Education: University of California, Los Angeles
- Scientific career
- Fields: Microbiology, cancer research
- Workplaces: National Cancer Institute
- Thesis: Characterization of Anti-Tetanus Toxoid Producing Human Pheripheral Blood Lymphocytes (1980)

Carol Jeanne Thiele is an American microbiologist and cancer researcher specialized in the development of novel therapeutic strategies for pediatric tumors. She is chief of the cell and molecular biology section at the National Cancer Institute. She is a founding editor of the journal Cell Death & Differentiation.

== Education ==
Thiele earned a Ph.D. in microbiology and immunology from the University of California, Los Angeles. Her 1980 dissertation was titled Characterization of Anti-Tetanus Toxoid Producing Human Pheripheral Blood Lymphocytes. She completed her postdoctoral research as a Cancer Research Institute and a Damon Runyon-Walter Winchell Fellow at the National Cancer Institute (NCI).

== Career and research ==
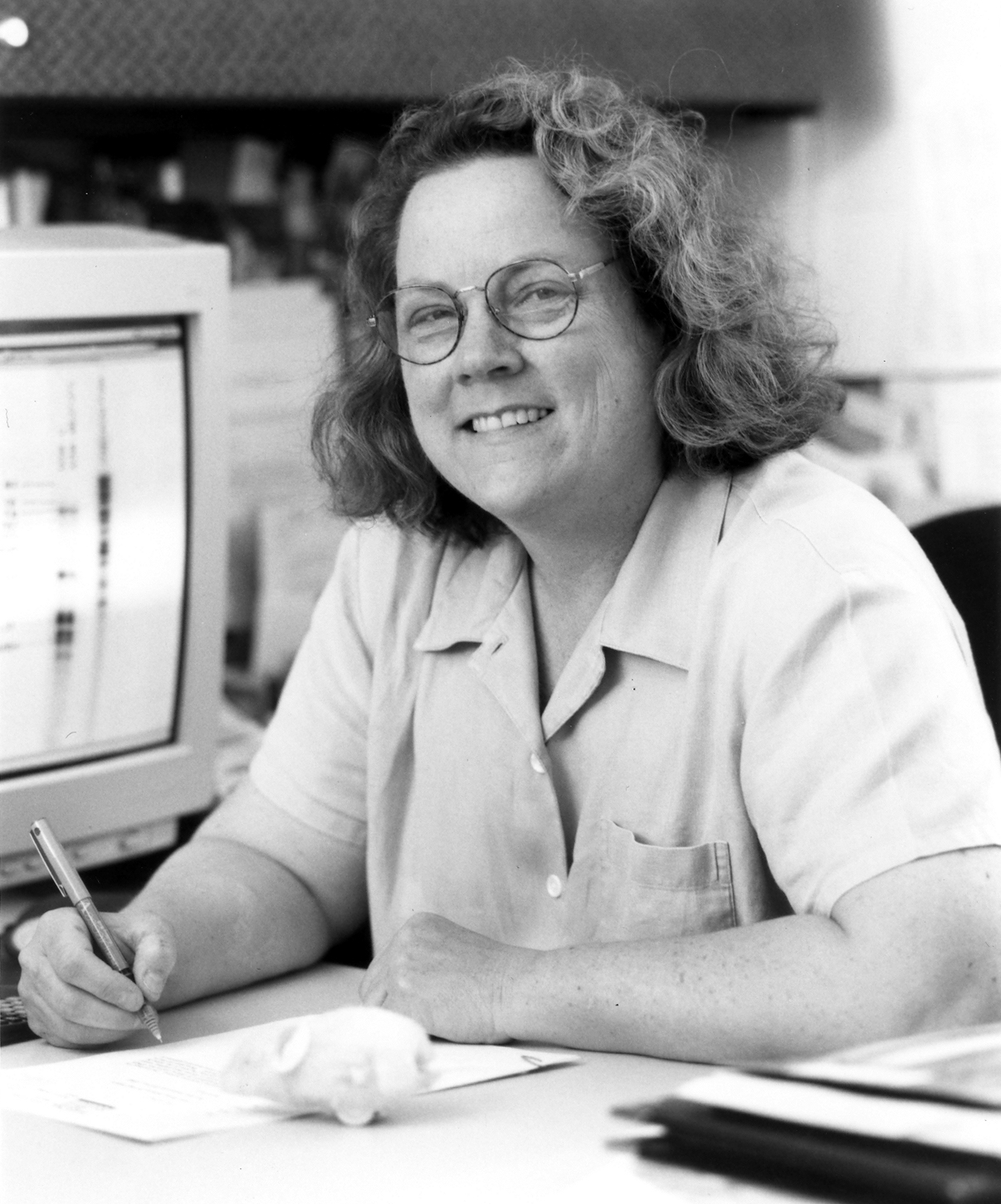
Thiele at the National Cancer Institute in 2000

Thiele was one of the founding editors of Cell Death & Differentiation, and has served on the editorial boards of Cell Death & Differentiation, Cancer Research and Molecular Cancer Therapeutics. Thiele was chair of the AACR Women in Cancer Research and has a long-standing interest in developing programs so that young scientific investigators can realize their potential. As chief of the cell and molecular biology section in the pediatric oncology branch, Thiele's scientific interest is in the field of cancer biology with a special emphasis on pediatric neuroectodermal tumors and neuronal development. She leads a research program which develops novel therapies for children with solid tumors using state-of-the-art biologic and genomic analyses of tumors and normal counterparts. Thiele pioneered studies using retinoids to “target” the MYCN oncogene and control tumor growth. These led to clinical studies which showed that retinoids improved outcomes for children with high-risk neuroblastoma. Her section has developed pre-clinical models and genetically engineered mice (GEMs) to study mechanisms of neuroblastoma tumorigenesis and assess novel therapeutic interventions. Other studies are aimed at understanding epigenetic/chromatin based mechanisms to re-program and differentiate neuroblastoma tumor cells. Thiele has been involved in the organization of the Advances in Neuroblastoma Research Association (ANRA). Her research explores molecular mechanisms involved in the pathogenesis of neuroblastoma tumors and utilizes insights gleaned from these studies to develop novel therapeutic strategies for pediatric tumors.
