= Northland Center For Advanced Professional Studies =

Location
- 2000 NE 46th Street; Kansas City, Missouri 64116; United States
- Coordinates: 39.178054°N 94.556696°W

Information
- Classes offered: Digital Media and Design, Engineering and Advanced Manufacturing, Global Business and Entrepreneurship, Global Logistics, Medicine and Healthcare, Technology Solutions
- Website: www.northlandcaps.org

Northland Center for Advanced Professional Studies (CAPS) is a high school program which operates multiple different magnet programs for students who live within the school districts of: Excelsior Springs, Kearney, Liberty, North Kansas City, Park Hill, Platte County, and Smithville.

The center focuses on providing an education focused on building professional skills in partnership with local businesses and educational institutions.

== Focus ==
The center offers pre-professional, innovative and entrepreneurial education by immersing students in professional environments and employing a curriculum developed by industry professionals and program instructors.

== Courses and Strands ==
- Digital Media and Design
- Global Business and Entrepreneurship
- Global Logistics
- Medicine and Healthcare
- Technology Solutions

== CAPS Network ==
Northland CAPS is part of the CAPS Network that links other schools employing the CAPS program.

- Affton Advanced Professional Studies (A@ps ), Affton School District, St. Louis County, Missouri
- Alexandria Public Schools, Alexandria, MN
- Blue Valley Center For Advanced Professional Studies, Overland Park, KS
- Cedar Falls Schools, Cedar Falls, IA
- ignite@psc – Bentonville Public Schools Professional Studies Center, Bentonville, AR
- The Innovation Collaboratory – Elmbrook School District, Elmbrook, WI
- GO CAPS, (Greater Ozarks Center for Advanced Professional Studies) – Participating GO CAPS districts include Bolivar, Branson, Logan-Rogersville, Monett, Nixa, Ozark, Reeds Spring, Republic, Springfield, Strafford and Willard.
- Park City CAPS in Park City, Utah
- Spark!, Parkway School District, St. Louis County, Missouri
- MET Professional Academy, Peoria Unified School District in Glendale, Arizona
- Minnesota Center for Advanced Professional Studies (MNCAPS), Lakeville Area Public Schools and Prior Lake-Savage Area Schools
- Shakopee Public Schools, Shakopee, MN
- Topeka Center for Advanced Learning and Careers, Topeka, Kansas
- VANTAGE (Minnetonka Advanced Professional Studies) in Minnetonka, Minnesota
- The School District of Washington located in Washington, MO
- Westside CAPS, Westside Community Schools in Omaha, Nebraska.

== See also ==
- Secondary education
- Profession
