= Carol Rubin =

American film producer (1945–2001)

- Born: Carol Ann Rubin; March 25, 1945
- Died: November 3, 2001 (aged 56); Sherman Oaks, Los Angeles, California
- Occupations: production supervisor, film producer
- Years active: 1970s – 2001

Carol Ann Rubin (March 23, 1945 – November 3, 2001) was an American film producer and production supervisor, who worked for the ABC television network and was involved in the production of several The Walt Disney Company made-for-television miniseries and films.

== Biography ==
Carol Rubin was born on March 23, 1945. She was the daughter of Samuel Rubin and had one brother, Ted. Rubin was vice-president of development for production companies such as Edgar Scherick Production and Intermedia Entertainment. She subsequently spent the following eleven years as executive producer of miniseries and director of dramatic development for the ABC television network. Rubin supervised the development and production of the television films Roots: The Next Generations, Masada, Friendly Fire, and East of Eden. She also served an associated producer on primetime soap opera Dynasty in the early 1980s.

In 1984, Rubin joined the staff of the Disney Channel. She was an executive director of original films, and was credited as having undertaken a major role in the development and production of the network's created-for-television franchise. Rubin supervised the miniseries and films Great Expectations (1989), Danny, the Champion of the World (1989), Heidi (1993), The Old Curiosity Shop (1995), Brink! (1998), and Zenon: Girl of the 21st Century (1999). On November 3, 2001, she died suddenly while sleeping at her home in Sherman Oaks, Los Angeles. The 2002 DCOM, Cadet Kelly was dedicated to her memory. Rubin was given a burial service at the Old North Church in Forest Lawn Memorial Park in the afternoon on November 9.

== Filmography ==
- Great Expectations (1989)
- Danny, the Champion of the World (1989)
- Heidi (1993)
- The Old Curiosity Shop (1995)
- Brink! (1998)
- Zenon: Girl of the 21st Century (1999)
