= Tamiko Thiel =

American artist (born 1957)

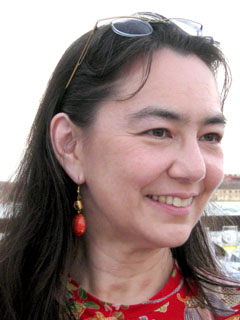
- Born: June 15, 1957 (age 69)
- Education: Stanford University; Massachusetts Institute of Technology; Academy of Fine Arts Munich
- Known for: Public art, new media, virtual reality, augmented reality
- Website: www.tamikothiel.com

Tamiko Thiel (born June 15, 1957) is an American artist, known for her digital art. Her work often explores "the interplay of place, space, the body and cultural identity," and uses augmented reality (AR) as her platform. Thiel is based in Munich, Germany.

== Early life and education ==
Tamiko Thiel was born June 15, 1957, in Oakland, California, and raised in Seattle, Washington. She is the daughter of Midori Kono Thiel, a Japanese-American calligrapher, and Philip Thiel, a German-American. Thiel attended Stanford University and graduated with a B.S. degree in Product Design in 1979. She went on to receive her M.S. degree in Mechanical Engineering in 1983 from Massachusetts Institute of Technology (MIT). There, she studied human-machine design at the school's Biomechanics Lab and computer graphics at the precursors to the Media Lab. In 1991, Thiel received her Diploma in Applied Graphics, specializing in video installation art, from the Academy of Fine Arts, Munich in Munich, Germany.

== Career ==
Thiel's first career was in product design, working at Hewlett-Packard in the Data Terminals Division. She later worked at Thinking Machines Corporation with Danny Hillis, Carl Feynman and Brewster Kahle, heading the design team that created the boolean n-cube hypercube chassis that defined the Connection Machine CM-1 and CM-2 supercomputers' appearance.

From November 1994 to February 1996, she worked for Starbright World as the creative director and producer of the initial system for the Starbright World project, working closely with Steven Spielberg, to create an online interactive 3D virtual world for seriously ill children.

Thiel has had many other exhibits, some of the most notable being her shows "Beyond Manzanar" (a piece about a World War II-era Japanese-American internment camp in California), "The Travels of Mariko Horo", and "Shades of Absence".

She is one of the founding members of Manifest.AR, a group of artists focused on augmented reality, with which she staged spontaneous interventions at Corcoran Gallery of Art in 2013, Tate Modern in 2012, the Venice Biennial in 2011, and Museum of Modern Art (New York City) in 2010.

Her work is included in various permanent museum collections, including the Museum of Modern Art (MOMA), San Jose Museum of Art, and many others.

== Work ==
Thiel's artwork for the last 25 years has focused on "site specific virtual reality installations" and AR projects. Her work has been displayed in international venues including the International Center of Photography, the Institute of Contemporary Art, Boston, Corcoran Gallery of Art, ZKM Center for Art and Media Karlsruhe, Tokyo Metropolitan Museum of Photography, Fondazione Querini Stampalia, Ars Electronica, SIGGRAPH conferences, ISEA International, and others. Thiel's artwork often utilizes augmented reality (AR) as a platform, and uses Layar, an augmented reality viewer. Thiel's works have been layered over locations such as the New York Stock Exchange, the Tate Museum in London, New York's Museum of Modern Art, the Berlin Wall, Piazza San Marco in Venice, and many other locations. Her works are featured in collections like the Museum of Modern Art and the Whitney Museum.

=== Beyond Manzanar (2000) ===
Beyond Manzanar is a large scale, immersive, virtual reality (VR) artwork Thiel co-created in 2000 with Iranian-American artist, Zara Houshmand. The technology located you inside the Manzanar, the known site of one of the ten American concentration camps, where more than 120,000 Japanese Americans were incarcerated during World War II. As you walk around and explore the camp, you physically constrained by the landscape and features, emphasizing the emotional feelings of confinement.

This work is part of the permanent collection at the San Jose Museum of Art and was part of the 2019 exhibition, Almost Human: Digital Art from the Permanent Collection.

=== Clouding Green (2012) ===
Clouding Green was a 2012 augmented reality (AR) installation taking place in various locations in Silicon Valley and in San Francisco. The installation showed animated clouds looming over many major Silicon Valley corporations, the color of the clouds ranged from ashy black to bright green depending on their usage of renewable energy.

=== Unexpected Growth (2018) ===
In 2018–2019, a commissioned and collaborative work with artist /p, Unexpected Growth an augmented reality (AR) installation was part of exhibition Programmed: Rules, Codes, and Choreographies in Art, 1965–2018 at the Whitney Museum of American Art in New York City. Unexpected Growth was site specific to the sixth floor terrace of the museum, showing coral growing on the building alongside small trash and slowly bleaching color over the span of one day.

=== Enter The Plastocene (2021) ===
Augmented reality large screen immersive projections by Tamiko Thiel and /p, 2021. This AR artwork put people in the middle of the garbage they have created, in a combination of video projections and tablets with the AR app. It was first presented at donumenta ART LAB Gleis 1 at Regensburg Central Station, Germany. The second exhibition took place 2022 at the MEET Digital Culture Center in Milan, Italy.

== Awards and honors ==
- 2024 - ACM SIGGRAPH Distinguished Artist Award for Lifetime Achievement in Digital Art
- AWE’s XR Hall of Fame! (Augmented World Expo)
- 2013 – MacDowell fellowship, MacDowell Colony, Peterborough, New Hampshire
- 2013 – Rockefeller Foundation Cultural Innovation Fund Award, awarded to eight artists for Mi Querido Barrio Project (My Beloved Neighborhood Project), a virtual cultural historical tour of El Barrio using mobile augmented reality (AR) by the Caribbean Cultural Center African Diaspora Institute (CCCADI). Tamiko Thiel served as the primary artistic instructor for this project.
- 2009 – IBM Innovation Award, grant awarded to Teresa Reuter and Tamiko Thiel (T+T) for the work "Virtuelle Mauer/ReConstructing the Wall"
- 2007 – Hauptstadtkulturfonds (Berlin Capital City Cultural Fund) Award
- 2004–2005 – Center for Advanced Visual Studies (CAVS) fellow, Massachusetts Institute of Technology (MIT)
- 1996 – Global Information Infrastructure Awards: Winner of Next Generation Award
- 1996 – Asahi Shimbun: Digital Entertainment Award
- 1995 – Cyberedge: Virtual Reality product of the Year Award

== Publications ==
=== Solo authorship ===
- "Cyber-Animism and Augmented Dreams," Leonardo Electronic Almanac (LEA), Istanbul, April 2011.
- "The Design of the Connection Machine," The Designed World: Images, Objects, Environments. Richard Buchanan, Dennis Doordan and Victor Margolin, Ed. Berg, New York, pp. 155–166.
- "Where Stones Can Speak: Dramatic Encounters in Interactive 3D Virtual Reality," chapter in the book Third Person: Authoring and Exploring Vast Narratives, ed. Pat Harrigan & Noah Wadrup-Fruin, MIT Press, Cambridge, MA, USA.
- "Life at the Interface of Art and Technology," ON SCREEN, 911 Media Arts Center, Seattle, WA., USA. Winter 2007, Vol. 18 No.1, pp. 32–34.
- "Beyond Manzanar: Creating Dramatic Structure in Ergodic Narratives," Published in the conference proceedings for Technologies for Interactive Digital Storytelling and Entertainment (TIDSE, now subsumed into the ICIDS conference), Darmstadt, Germany, June 24–26, 2004, Springer Berlin / Heidelberg.
- "Veiled Fantasies," Site Street Online Journal, Fall 2002
- "Dramatic structure in interactive virtual reality," Aedo-ba, Villa Tosca Design Management Center, Milan, Nr. 03/04, Fall 2001 pp. 40–45.
- "Beyond Manzanar: Constructing Meaning in Interactive Virtual Reality," COSIGN 2001 Conference Proceedings, Amsterdam, Holland.
- "Machine Sapiens," Ylem Newsletter, Vol. 15, No. 6, Nov./Dec. 1995. pp. 5–6.
- "The Design of the Connection Machine," (Japanese text) InterCommunication Magazine, InterCommunication Center of the NTT, Tokyo, Japan, No. 8, Spring 1994. pp. 128–135.
- "The Design of the Connection Machine," DesignIssues, The MIT Press, Cambridge, MA, Vol. 10, No. 1, Spring 1994. pp. 5–18.
- "Vijfenzestigduizend Processoren in Twaalf Dimensies," (in Dutch) Computable, Netherlands, 26E Jaargang, Week 22, 4 June 1993, pp. 25, 27.
- "Machina Cogitans," (text in English and German) Genetic Art - Artificial Life, ARS ELECTRONICA, Linz, Austria. pp. 186–194
- "The Connection Machine," AXIS Design Magazine, Number 45, Tokyo, Japan, 1992

=== Collaborative authorship ===
- With Houshmand, Zara. "Beyond Manzanar", [Two] Factorial, !Factorial Press, San Diego, CA, 2003
- With Houshmand, Zara. "Beyond Manzanar," on front Page of NW Nikkei / North American Post, Vol. 18 No.17, April 21, 2001, pp. 1,5.
- With Houshmand, Zara. "Beyond Manzanar," SIGGRAPH 2001 Electronic Art and Animation Catalog and CD-ROM, ACM SIGGRAPH, New York, page 125.
