= Carol Roberts (footballer) =

New Zealand footballer

Personal information
- Full name: Carol Roberts
- Date of birth: 3 February 1964 (age 62)

International career
Years	Team	Apps	(Gls)
1984–1994	New Zealand	7	(1)

Carol Roberts (née Adamson) (born 3 February 1964) is a former association football player who represented New Zealand at international level.

Roberts made her Football Ferns début in a 3–0 win over Switzerland on 8 December 1984, and finished her international career with seven caps and one goal to her credit.
