= Carol Roberts (politician) =

American politician (born 1936)

Carol Antonia Roberts (born June 22, 1936) is an American politician of the Democratic Party in Florida. She is best known for her part in the 2000 Florida election recount, where she served on the Palm Beach County canvassing board.

In 2002, she ran unsuccessfully for Florida's 22nd congressional district seat in the U.S. House of Representatives against Republican incumbent E. Clay Shaw, Jr., finishing with 38 percent of the vote.

She previously served as mayor and city commissioner of West Palm Beach, and as a county commissioner of Palm Beach County, Florida.

She was married to Dr. Hyman J. Roberts, by whom she has six children. For two years (1986–88) she was National President of ACTS, a private foundation assisting communities to Self Help. She served as ACTS' representative for famine relief in East Africa.

Carol and Hyman Roberts have been benefactors to several universities, museums, art galleries and charities. She has volunteered her time on the board of directors for numerous non-profit, educational and civil rights organizations.
