= Carol R. Roberts =

American politician (born 1942)

Member of the New Hampshire House of Representatives from the 4th Hillsborough district
- In office December 3, 2014 – June 8, 2018
- Preceded by: Steve Spratt
- Succeeded by: Jennifer Bernet

Personal details
- Born: Carol Rose Covell; November 9, 1942 (age 83) Lebanon, New Hampshire
- Party: Democratic
- Education: Lesley University (BS); Simmons College (MSLS)

Carol Rose Roberts (born November 9, 1942) is an American politician who served as a member of the New Hampshire House of Representatives. First elected in 2014, she won reelection in 2016 before resigning in 2018 on her relocation outside of her district.
