= Ria Thiele =

German actress, dancer and choreographer

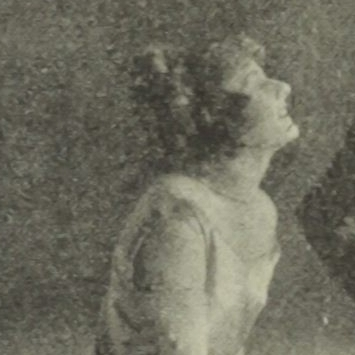
- Born: Maria Thiele; 18 March 1904; Kleve
- Died: 20 April 1996 (aged 92); Düsseldorf, Germany
- Occupations: Actress; Dancer; Choreographer
- Organizations: Düsseldorfer Schauspielhaus; Deutsches Volkstheater, Vienna; Theater des Westens, Berlin; Teatro María Guerrero, Madrid

Maria "Ria" Thiele (18 March 1904 – 20 April 1996) was a German actress, dancer and choreographer who appeared in theatres of European capitals, including the Deutsches Volkstheater in Vienna and Theater des Westens in Berlin.

== Career ==
Born in Kleve, Thiele was the daughter of Otto Thiele and his wife Maria, who had six daughters and a son. The family moved to Düsseldorf-Oberkassel shortly after her birth. When she was aged 15, her father sent her to the Hochschule für Bühnenkunst of the Düsseldorfer Schauspielhaus, run by Louise Dumont and Gustav Lindemann.

She appeared on stage the same year, for example with Gustaf Gründgens, another student, at the garden restaurant Vossen Links in Oberkassel and on the Düsseldorf stage as a fairy in Shakespeare's Ein Sommernachtstraum. She made her official debut on 8 June 1920 as Wendla Bergmann in Wedekind's Frühlings Erwachen.

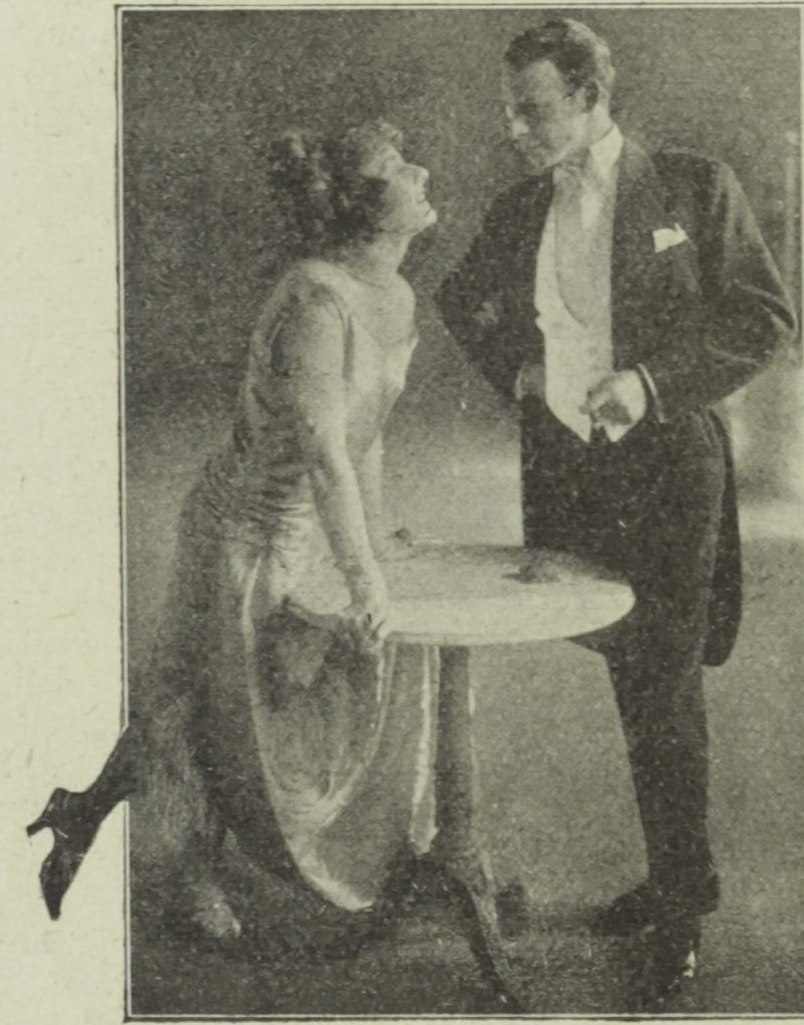
Thiele with Wolf H. Kersten in Antonia by Melchior Lengyel in the Raimundtheater (1925)

When the Düsseldorfer Schauspielhaus was closed in 1922, Thiele accepted a contract with the Deutsches Volkstheater in Vienna, together with her colleague Eugen Dumont who was 27 years older. Her parents opposed it, and the couple therefore got married. During her time in Vienna, Thiele pursued dancing at the school of Rudolf von Laban. She was particularly successful as Anitra in Ibsens's Peer Gynt, also dancing. She held dance performances. Max Brod wrote in a review that scenes of gymnastics and dance were added for her, and noted that her well-trained body appeared ingenious and never boring even without dialogue ("Dieser durchtrainierte Körper wirkt auch ohne Dialog geistreich und nie langweilig.")

In 1926, Thiele divorced Dumont and moved to the Theater des Westens in Berlin, where she appeared alongside Willy Fritsch and Willi Forst. In 1929, she played for six months in Prague, where she was a celebrated favourite with the audience ("gefeierter Liebling des Prager Publikums"). A year later, she married Karl Levinger, an entrepreneur from Ulm. She returned to the Düsseldorfer Schauspielhaus three years later.

Under the Nazi regime, Thiele and her husband moved to Alcalá de Henares near Madrid in 1935 where they ran a chicken farm. During the Spanish Civil War, the farm was confiscated and her husband arrested. Thiele escaped to Marseille and further to Vienna, where she was housed by Fritz Wotruba. Her daughter Lydia was born there in 1937. Her husband was free after five months and followed her. When the Gestapo searched for him in 1938, they moved back to Spain. Levinger was traumatised and planned to emigrate to Chile or the United States. When Thiele objected, she was sent to an asylum (Irrenanstalt). She escaped after four weeks. With the help of friends, she managed a new existence as a teacher of dance and gymnastics. She was a choreographer for the Teatro María Guerrero. Karl Levinger took his life in 1946.

Thiele formed her own successful dance company. She had to give up dancing because of a knee injury and appeared as an actress again.

Thiele moved back to Düsseldorf but accepted no acting contracts, although Gründgens, now Intendant of the Düsseldorfer Schauspielhaus, asked her to become a member of the ensemble. She began writing and became a member of the Freier Deutscher Autorenverband in 1985. She published her memoirs, Und mir wuchsen Flügel, in 1994. She died in Düsseldorf.

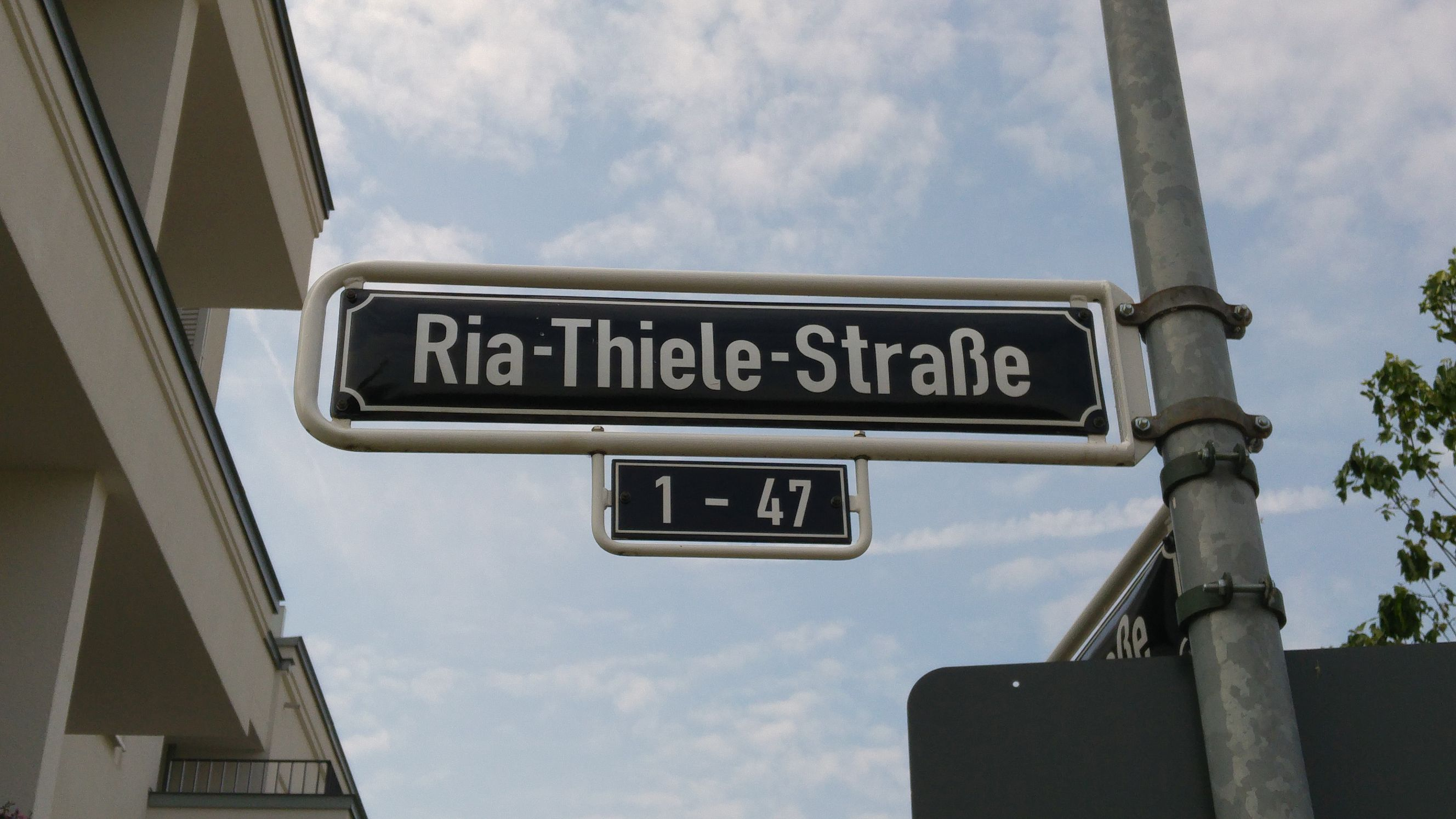
Ria-Thiele-Strasse, Düsseldorf

In 2011, a street in the new Düsseldorf quarter Belsenpark was named after Ria Thiele.

== Publication ==
- Maria Thiele (1994), Und mir wuchsen Flügel. Mein Kampf gegen das Räderwerk der Franco-Justiz. Autobiographisches Zeitdokument (in German), Neuss: Ahasvera, ISBN 3-927720-02-X

== Cited sources ==
- Heide-Ines Willner (1994), Das Entzücken der Stadt. Maria Thiele – Vom Düsseldorf-Oberkasseler Mädchen zum Theaterstar europäischer Bühnen (in German), Düsseldorf: Triltsch, ISBN 3-7998-0065-4
- Verkehrs- und Verschönerungs-Verein, ed. (2004), Unser Jahrhundert. Chronik einer Halbinsel. Düsseldorf-Linksrheinisch 1904–2004 (in German), Düsseldorf: Grupello, ISBN 3-89978-017-5
- "18. März 2004 - Vor 100 Jahren: Maria Thiele in Kleve geboren - Auf der Bühne Europas". WDR. 2004-03-18.
