= Carollo =

Carollo is a surname. Notable people with the surname include:

- Agostino Carollo (Spankox), Italian musician, disc jockey, singer and producer
- Anthony Carollo (1923–2007), American mobster, boss of the New Orleans crime family, son of the mob boss Silvestro Carollo
- Bill Carollo (born 1951), retired American football official
- C. Marcella Carollo, professional astronomer from 1994 to 2019
- Charles "Charley The Wop" Carollo (1902–1979), Italian-born Kansas City, Missouri crime boss during the 1930s
- Giorgio Carollo (born 1944), Italian politician
- Joe Carollo (born 1955), Cuban-American politician, mayor of Miami 1996–1997 and 1998–2001
- Joe Carollo (American football) (born 1940), former American football offensive tackle
- Russell Carollo (1955–2018), American Pulitzer prize-winning journalist
- Sante Carollo (1924–2004), Italian road cyclist
- Silvestro Carollo (1896–1970), nicknamed "Silver Dollar Sam", Italian-American mob boss, boss of the New Orleans crime family
- Vincenzo Carollo (1920–2013), Italian politician from Palermo and member of the Christian Democratic Party (DC)

== See also ==
- Carolle
- Carollo engineers, environmental engineering firm specializing in water and wastewater facilities for municipal and public sector clients in the United States
- Caracollo
- Cariello
- Corallo
- Curillo
