= Barry Mano =

Magazine publisher

- Born: June 12, 1943; Racine, Wisconsin, U.S.
- Died: March 31, 2026 (aged 82); Union Grove, Wisconsin
- Education: University of Wisconsin–Parkside
- Occupation: Publisher
- Years active: 1973-2018
- Known for: Referee magazine

Barry Mano was an American magazine publisher and founder of the National Association of Sports Officials (NASO). During a nearly five decades long career, Mano was one of the leading figures in promoting the professionalization of sports officials at all levels of participation.

== Early life and education ==
Mano was born on June 12, 1943 in Racine, Wisconsin, the son of Helen and Rudy Mano. His mother was a homemaker and his father held a variety of jobs to include working part time as a baseball, basketball, and football sports official. As Barry and his brother Mark grew older, their father introduced them to the world of officiating and by the time Barry was in high school he was refereeing basketball games. In his 20s, he and his brother decided to try their hands at drag racing. They spent nearly a decade traveling to events all over the country with Mark as the driver and Barry as the mechanic. In 1968, the brothers left the racing business with Barry attending the University of Wisconsin–Parkside where he received a bachelor’s degree in economics. He later earned a master’s degree in urban planning from the University of Wisconsin–Milwaukee, while Mark was hired by the NBA as a referee.

== Career ==
After spending several years working for the Joseph Schlitz Brewing Company, Barry left his job when Mark was fired from the NBA, unfairly, they both believed. In 1972, during a game between the Chicago Bulls and Los Angeles Lakers, Mark made a controversial call that nullified a buzzer-beating shot by Chet Walker that would have won the game for the Bulls. The Chicago crowd was so incensed, Mark had to be escorted off the floor by a combined squad of Chicago police officers and Lakers, including teammates Wilt Chamberlain and Jerry West. The following day, Mark was excoriated in the local press for his call. Although his actions were defended by NBA, he was later dismissed from the league.

Seeing a void in how sports officials were treated by fans, the media, and their employers, Barry, Mark, their father Rudy, and a group of investors started Referee magazine with the inaugural issue being published in January 1976. Characterizing the magazine as “by officials, for officials”, it lost money for the first several years causing the brothers to continue working as officials at various sporting events to supplement their incomes. As Referee sales and influence began to spread, Barry founded the non-profit National Association of Sports Officials, which, like the magazine, advocated for sports officials at all levels. NASO membership eventually grew to well over 30,000 with the organization providing members with training, counseling, legal assistance, and liability insurance. As publisher and NASO founder, Barry Mano became a spokesman for sports officials at all levels and was frequently searched out by the media for his opinion on officiating in the United States. While he tirelessly defended sports officials against abuse, he also recognized that fans and the media would not always be happy with outcomes.

"Our assignment is not a popularity contest. It is to know the rules and get the plays called correctly. If those become the core values you have as a sports official, then the rest becomes background noise. Learn to tune that out or learn to use that to feed your desire to do the job better, with more courage and conviction. This undertaking is not for the faint of heart."

== Death ==
Barry Mano died on March 31, 2026. At the time of his death he was survived by his daughter, Julia and his brother, Mark. His wife, Jean Mano prececed him in death in 2024.
