= Red Oberbruner =

American basketball and baseball player, coach, and administrator

Biographical details
- Born: October 5, 1918; Ashland, Wisconsin, U.S.
- Died: September 6, 1991 (aged 72); Burlington, Wisconsin, U.S.

Playing career

Basketball
- 1938–1940: Notre Dame
- 1941–1942: Fort Wayne Zollner Pistons

Baseball
- 1939–1940: Notre Dame
- Positions: Small forward, shooting guard (basketball); Catcher (baseball)

Coaching career (HC unless noted)

Football
- 1948–1961: Milton

Basketball
- 1948–1970: Milton

Baseball
- 1948–1970: Milton
- 1970–1991: Wisconsin–Parkside

Head coaching record
- Overall: 257–198 (basketball)

Accomplishments and honors

Championships
- Football; 1 Badger-Illini (1956)

Kenneth Lewis "Red" Oberbruner (October 5, 1918 – September 6, 1991) was an American basketball and baseball player and college sports coach and administrator. He served as the head football coach at Milton College in Milton, Wisconsin from 1948 to 1961. Oberbruner was also the head baseball coach at the University of Wisconsin–Parkside in Kenosha, Wisconsin from 1970 to 1991.

Oberbruner played professional basketball for the Fort Wayne Zollner Pistons for two seasons—the first while it was an independent team and the next in the National Basketball League (NBL) during 1941–42. He averaged 2.2 points per game in the NBL.

Oberbruner was appointed head coach and director of physical education at Milton in 1948 after working as an assistant coach under Elmer Fenton the previous year. He remained athletic director and head coach of Milton's basketball and baseball teams until resigning in 1970. His basketball teams had a record of 257–198 and his baseball teams were 237–82.

After his days at Milton, Oberbruner was named the first coach in the history of the University of Wisconsin–Parkside baseball program in 1970. His teams were perennial All-District Tournament contenders, and he ended his career among the top-five NCAA Division II coaches in victories (254). He was inducted to the Wisconsin High School Baseball Coaches Association and the National Association of Intercollegiate Athletics District 14 Hall of Fame. After stepping down, the school named their baseball field in his honor on April 11, 1992. The Rangers played their home games at Oberbruner Field until moving to Simmons Field in 2019.

Oberbruner died on September 6, 1991, at his home in Burlington, Wisconsin.

== Head coaching record ==
=== Football ===
Year	Team	Overall	Conference	Standing	Bowl/playoffs
Milton Wildcats (Badger-Illini Conference) (1948–1956)
1948	Milton	3–4	2–3	5th	
1949	Milton	6–2	6–1	2nd	
1950	Milton	2–3–2	2–3–1	4th	
1951	Milton	5–1	5–1	2nd	
1952	Milton	3–3			
1953	Milton	3–3			
1954	Milton	3–3			
1955	Milton	3–3	3–3	T–3rd	
1956	Milton	6–0	5–0	1st	
Milton Wildcats (NAIA independent) (1957)
1957	Milton	0–5			
Milton Wildcats (Badger-Gopher Conference) (1958–1961)
1958	Milton		0–5	6th	
1959	Milton		1–3	T–4th	
1960	Milton	1–4	0–4	5th	
1961	Milton	4–3	1–3	4th	
Milton:					
Total:					
National championship Conference title Conference division title or championship game berth
