= Carolee =

Carolee is a feminine given name. Notable people with the name include:

- Carolee Carmello (born 1962), American actress
- Carolee Schneemann (1939–2019), American visual artist

== See also ==
- Carolle
- Caralee
- Carole
