= Alex Pettit =

American public administration official

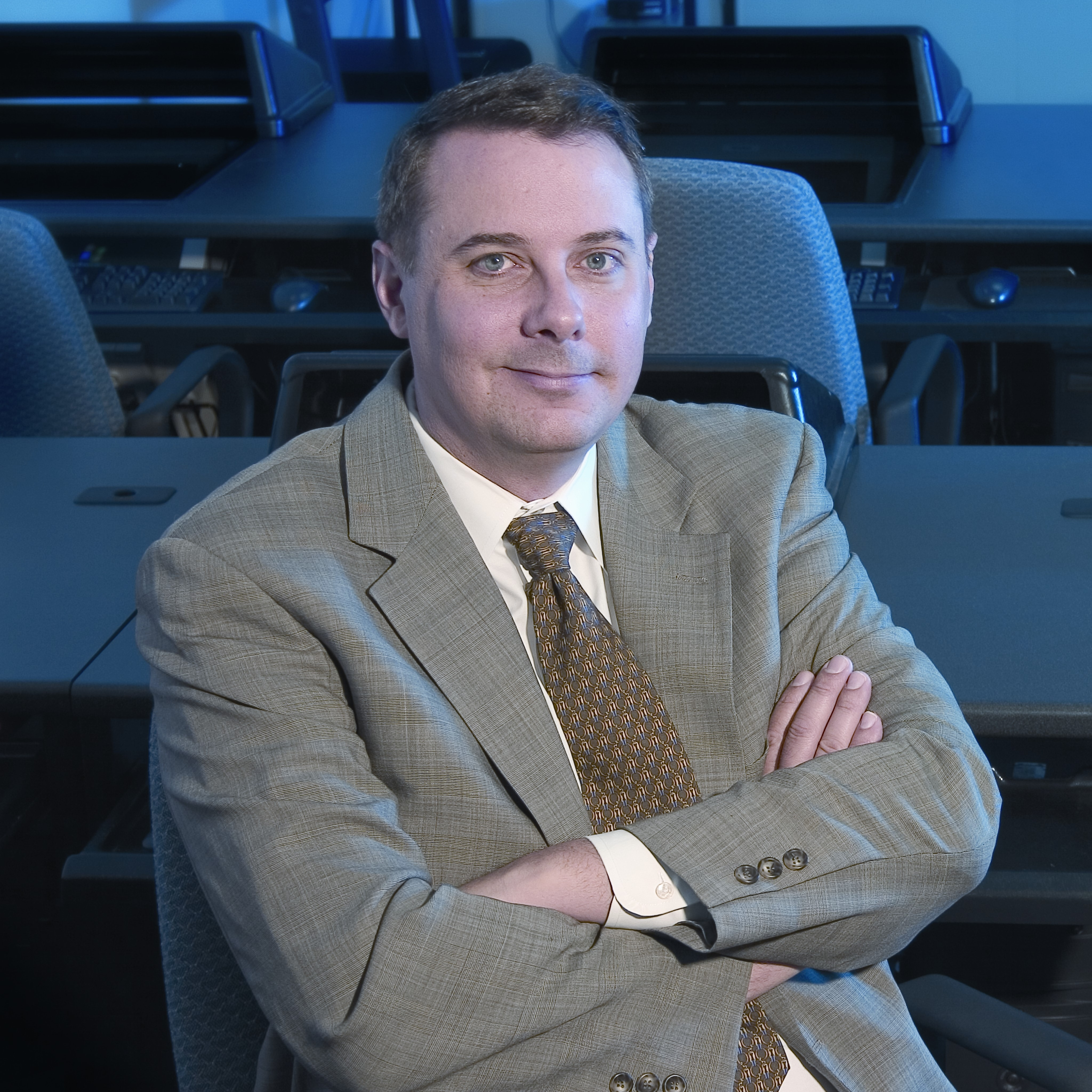
- Alex Pettit, January 2020

Chief information officer of the State of Oklahoma
- In office April 5, 2010 – January 3, 2014
- Governor: Brad Henry; Mary Fallin
- Preceded by: Post created

Chief information officer of the State of Oregon
- In office January 4, 2014 – April 6, 2018
- Governor: John Kitzhaber; Kate Brown

Personal details
- Born: 1966 (age 59–60)
- Occupation: Public administrator

Alex Pettit is an American public administration official who held office as Chief Technology Officer for the State of Colorado Governor's Office of Information Technology. Pettit was formerly the chief information officer for the State of Oregon. As State CIO, Pettit worked in the Department of Administrative Services and was responsible for all information and telecommunication systems for all state agencies.

Pettit was the first CIO for the State of Oklahoma, serving from April 2010 until January 2014. He resigned.

In March 2014, Pettit was appointed interim CIO for Cover Oregon, the agency responsible for the implementation of the Health Care Exchange in compliance of the Affordable Care Act. Cover Oregon was deemed too costly, and scrapped in favor of the federal website. Due to accusations of fraud, an FBI investigation was opened into Oracle Corporation which was contracted for Cover Oregon.

Under Petitt, the Oregon unit came under question, when an audit stated that "steps necessary to make sure the agencies are meeting federal cyber security requirements" had not been taken. There were 2 security breaches in 2014 and 2015.

Pettit was appointed to his position by Governor John Kitzhaber on January 6, 2014.

== Biography ==
Pettit earned his bachelor's degree from the University of Wisconsin–Parkside and received a Master of Business Administration from Loyola University of Chicago. In 2014, he completed his Ph.D. in Interdisciplinary Information Sciences from the University of North Texas.

Pettit began his public career in 1998 in Denton, Texas as the first Chief Technology Officer for the city. He served in this capacity until October 2008. He then worked for private company Marsh McLennan in planning. He served in that position until 2009 when he became a consultant for Brown University where he served as project manager for planning and coordination of Brown's data center.

In 2010, Governor of Oklahoma Brad Henry appointed Pettit as the State's first Chief Information Officer. On January 6, 2011, Governor-elect Mary Fallin announced that she would retain Pettit as State CIO. Pettit left the State of Oklahoma in January, 2014 and assumed the position of CIO for the State of Oregon. In this position, he was responsible for overseeing 40,000 state employees. On April 6, 2018 Pettit resigned his position as the State of Oregon CIO. He served in the administration of Governor Kate Brown. From 2020 to 2025, he served as the Colorado Governor’s Office of Information Technology chief technology officer. During that time, he advised the governor on regulatory frameworks for artificial intelligence and blockchain technology. In 2025, he moved back to Oregon to serve as the state's digital transformation projects director.
