= Cariello =

Cariello is an Italian surname. Notable people with the surname include:

- Alfredo Cariello (born 1979), Italian footballer
- Dominic A. Cariello, American general
- Mario J. Cariello (1907–1985), American lawyer, politician and judge
- Sergio Cariello (born 1964), Brazilian-American comics artist
