= Michael Edward Edgerton =

American composer (born 1961)

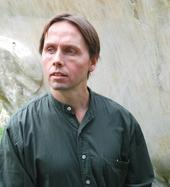

Michael Edward Edgerton (born October 31, 1961, in Racine, Wisconsin) is an American composer and associate professor of music composition and theory at the Guangxi Arts University. He received his D.M.A. in music composition from the University of Illinois at Urbana (1994); the M.M. from Michigan State University (1987) and the B.A. from the University of Wisconsin–Parkside (1984). From 1996 to 1999, Edgerton was a postdoctoral fellow with the National Center for Voice and Speech, based at the Waisman Center at the University of Wisconsin–Madison. He has studied composition with William Brooks, Morgan Powell, Jere Hutcheson and August Wegner.

== Awards/recognition ==
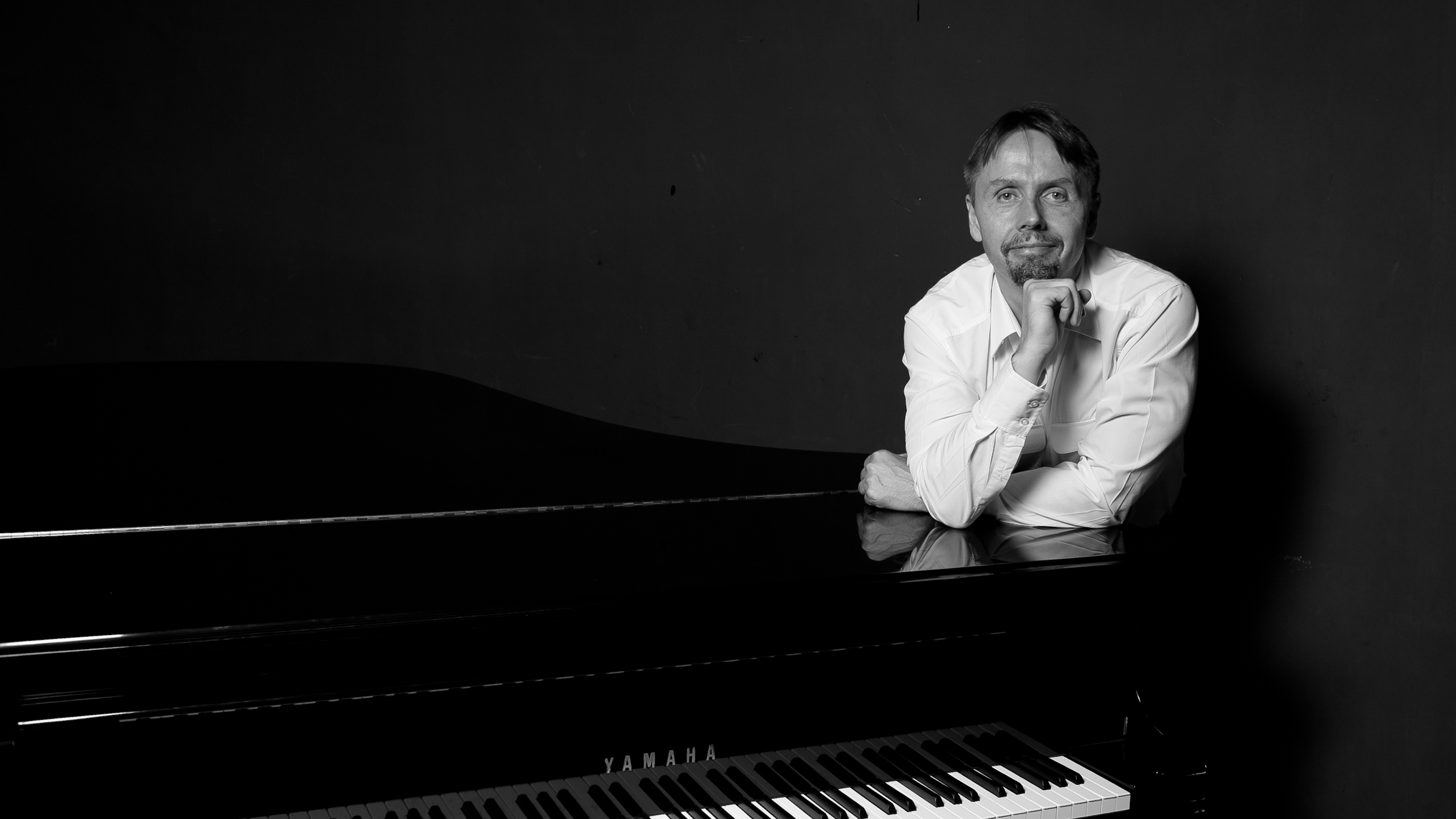
Edgerton, 2013, Experimental Theater at the University of Malaya, Kuala Lumpur

- 2007 Kompositionspreis der Landeshauptstadt Stuttgart
- 2007 Composition Contest of the Netherlands Radio Choir – Semifinalist (Kalevi Matus, #58)
- 2003 5th Dutilleaux International Composition Compétition – Selection (1 sonata, #70)
- 2001 31 Festival Synthese Bourges – Sélection (The Elements of Risk in Creation, #59)
- 1999 Sal Martirano composition competition – Finalist (Regret of a Noiseless Sundering, #22)
- 1995 MacDowell Club Award for composition – First Prize (Unspoken Crime, #9)
- 1993 Friends and Enemies of New Music – reading (Net/Byrinth, #15)
- 1988 Midwest Composers Symposium – selection (A Penny for the Young Guy, #3 )
- 1987 National Federation of Music Clubs Composition Competition – Third Prize (Ai, #5)
- 1987 National Federation of Music Clubs Composition Competition – Honorable Mention (Dwellers of the Southwest, #2)
- 1986 Michigan State University Orchestral Composition Competition – First Prize (The Final Diary of a Branch, #1)

== Style ==
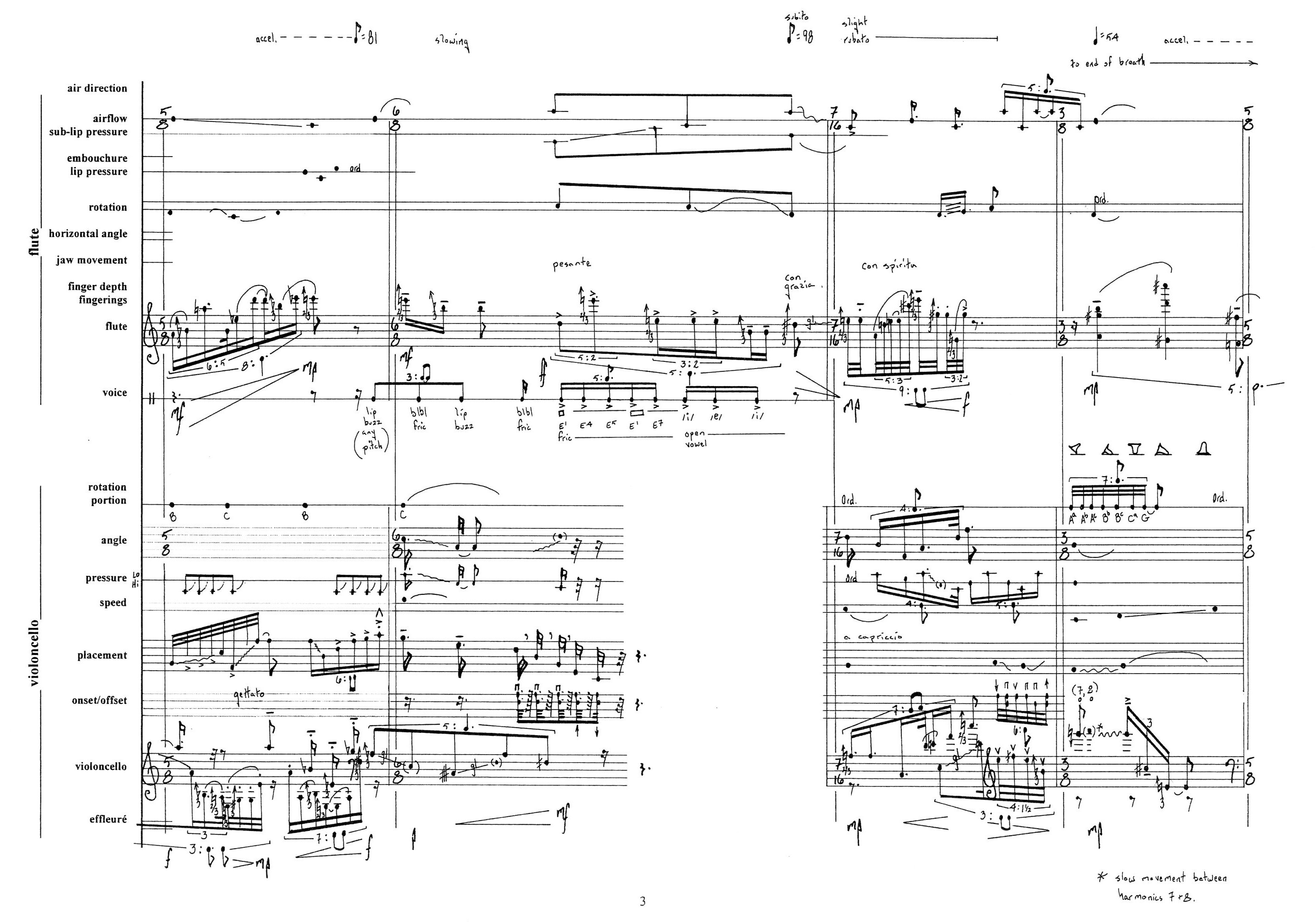
Edgerton: adjusting to beams falling, for flute and cello, #73, 2006

Since mid-1990 Edgerton has been pioneering the compositional use of scaled & desynchronized multidimensional networks in order to unlock nonlinear phenomenon inherent in mechanical sound production systems (voice and musical instruments). These procedures utilize topological inquiry focused on little traveled regions of the total sonic map. For Edgerton, these multidimensional networks do not just focus on articulation, which is dominant with many who utilize multi-parametric organization. Rather, with Edgerton, these networks utilize all structural components of the mechanical system: power, source, resonance and articulation in order to affect a meaningful (perceptible) sound difference from ordinario. Additionally, more than a focus on unusual sounds or performance practice, the systematic use of desynchronized procedures coupled tightly to expected bifurcations amongst attractor states are utilized as intelligent generative procedures encompassing the consonance/dissonance and musical tension of these extra-complex sonorities (tones that exceed a single fundamental frequency with gradually sloping spectra).

In works such as adjusting to beams falling and his String Quartet #1, he attempts to convey an expression similar to Edward Said's notion of an artwork exhibiting "intransigence, difficulty, and unresolved contradiction" in order to provide an "occasion to stir up more anxiety, tamper irrevocably with the possibility of closure and leave the audience more perplexed than before... to explore...a nonharmonious, non-serene tension, and above all, a sort of deliberately unproductive productiveness, going 'against'..."

Linkage. Other composers who have worked with desynchronized and/or multidimensional methods include Richard Barrett, Aaron Cassidy, Frank Cox, Julio Estrada, Brian Ferneyhough, Klaus K. Hübler, among others. Edgerton's work is sometimes associated with New Complexity in music.

== Voice ==
Edgerton is a specialist of the extra-normal voice as composer, pedagogue, researcher and performer.

Voice composition: Edgerton has written numerous compositions involving normal and extra-normal voice. Since the mid-90s his voice compositions have focused on searching for the bio-acoustic limits of vocal sound production that involve: 1) nonlinear phenomena; 2) simultaneous sound sources in the vocal tract; 3) multidimensionalty of vocal sound production. Additionally, Edgerton has incorporated sound production procedures seen in ethnic musical traditions from Tuva, Tibet, South Africa, Korea and India, to name a few. Representative compositions featuring the extra-normal voice include: #82 Cataphora, #77 A Marriage of Shadows, #68 prana, #62 Anaphora, #54 Friedrich’s Comma, #45 Taffy Twisters, among others.

Voice pedagogue: Edgerton is a teacher of voice, focusing on methods of extra-normal voice production that extend western avant-garde (anti)traditions, which are influenced from nonwestern music and informed by voice science. Edgerton’s methods are, in the first instance, based upon the healthy voice (i.e. bel canto) that attempt to explore the biodiversity of sound production, in order to expand the limits of the voice – particularly those involving nonlinear phenomena. Edgerton gives individual lessons as well as workshops. His pedagogical activities includes writings designed to spread the idea of systematic processes in voice exploration, these include a book (The 21st Century Voice), two forthcoming book chapters – one in The Oxford Handbook of Singing and the other in Teaching Singing in the 21st Century and two collections of pedagogical compositions, each focused on a separate aspect of the extra-normal voice.

Voice Research: In 1995 Edgerton was asked by Barney Childs and Phillip Rehfeldt, then editors of the New Instrumentation Series at the University of California Press, to contribute a book discussing extended vocal techniques. As a result, Edgerton applied for and received a 3-year postdoctoral fellowship from the National Center for Voice and Speech (1996 to 1999) to conduct research for this project. Under the supervision of Diane Bless, Edgerton began the formal study of voice science which has led to the publication of articles and his book, The 21st Century Voice, as part of the New Instrumentation Series at Scarecrow Press.

Voice performer: Edgerton as performer focuses on contemporary and ethnic-influenced vocal music as well as in improvised settings. Edgerton views the process of voice production as similar to electro-acoustic composition in which the elements of production: power {airflow}, acoustic source {vocal folds or upper vocal tract disruption}, resonators {lower, upper, nasal vocal tract} and articulation {tongue, velum, lips, etc.} are identified and separately emphasized in order to change timbre or even the class of sound production. Edgerton has improvised with Mathias Bauer, Frédérique Bruyas, Axel Dörner, Fern Chern Hwei, Andrés Galeano, Goh Lee-Kwong, Johan van Kreij, Romain Mercier, Izumi Ose, Hugues Vincent, Yong Yandsen, Etienne Ziemniak. A CD of improvised performance to the text of "The Raven" by Edgar Allan Poe, in three versions: one in translation by Charles Baudelaire, one in translation by Stéphane Mallarmé, and the original by Poe. The CD was a collaboration by Frédérique Bruyas and Edgerton and is titled the raven/le Corbeau edgar Poe published by Escargot MNT.

== Work ==
Orchestra/sinfonietta

- #87__Party Pieces Project, for orchestra (2013)
- #84__The Garden of Risk, for sinfonietta (2009/2012)
- #42__Pyramid of Unas, for orchestra and six voices (1998 – revision needed)
- #01__The Final Diary of a Branch, for orchestra (1985)

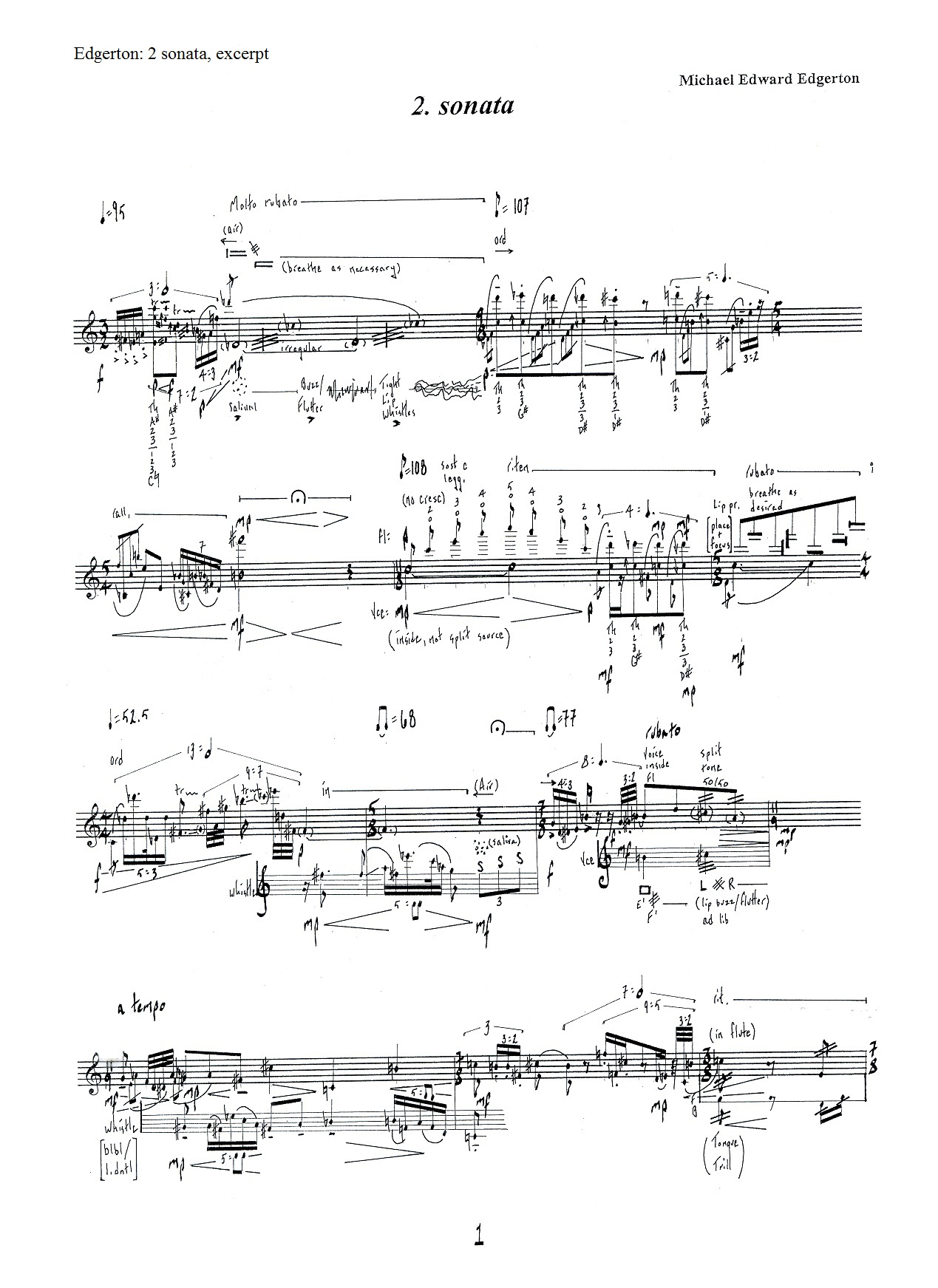
#86_2 sonata, for alto flute, page 1

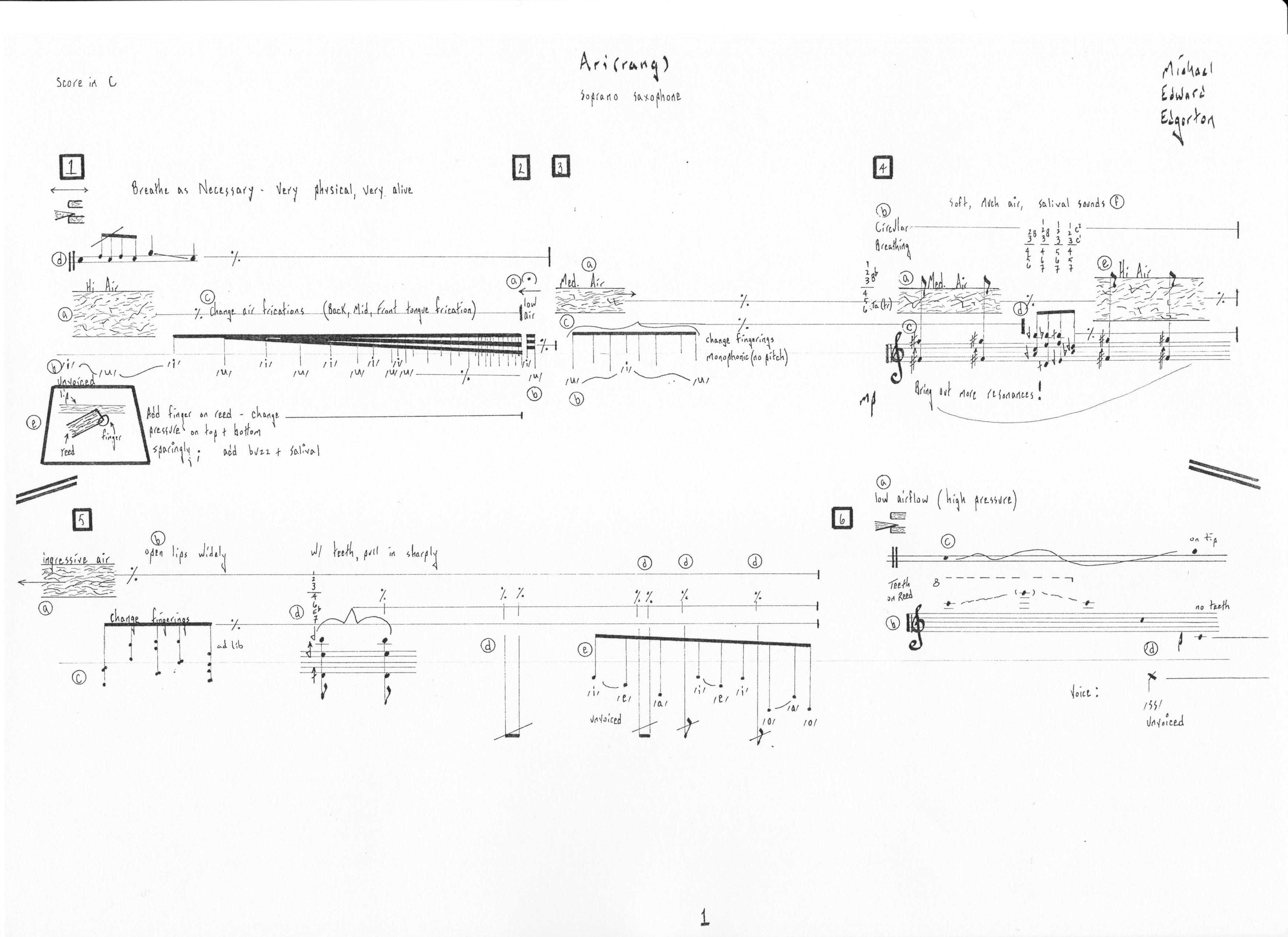
#85a_Ari(rang), for soprano sax, page 1

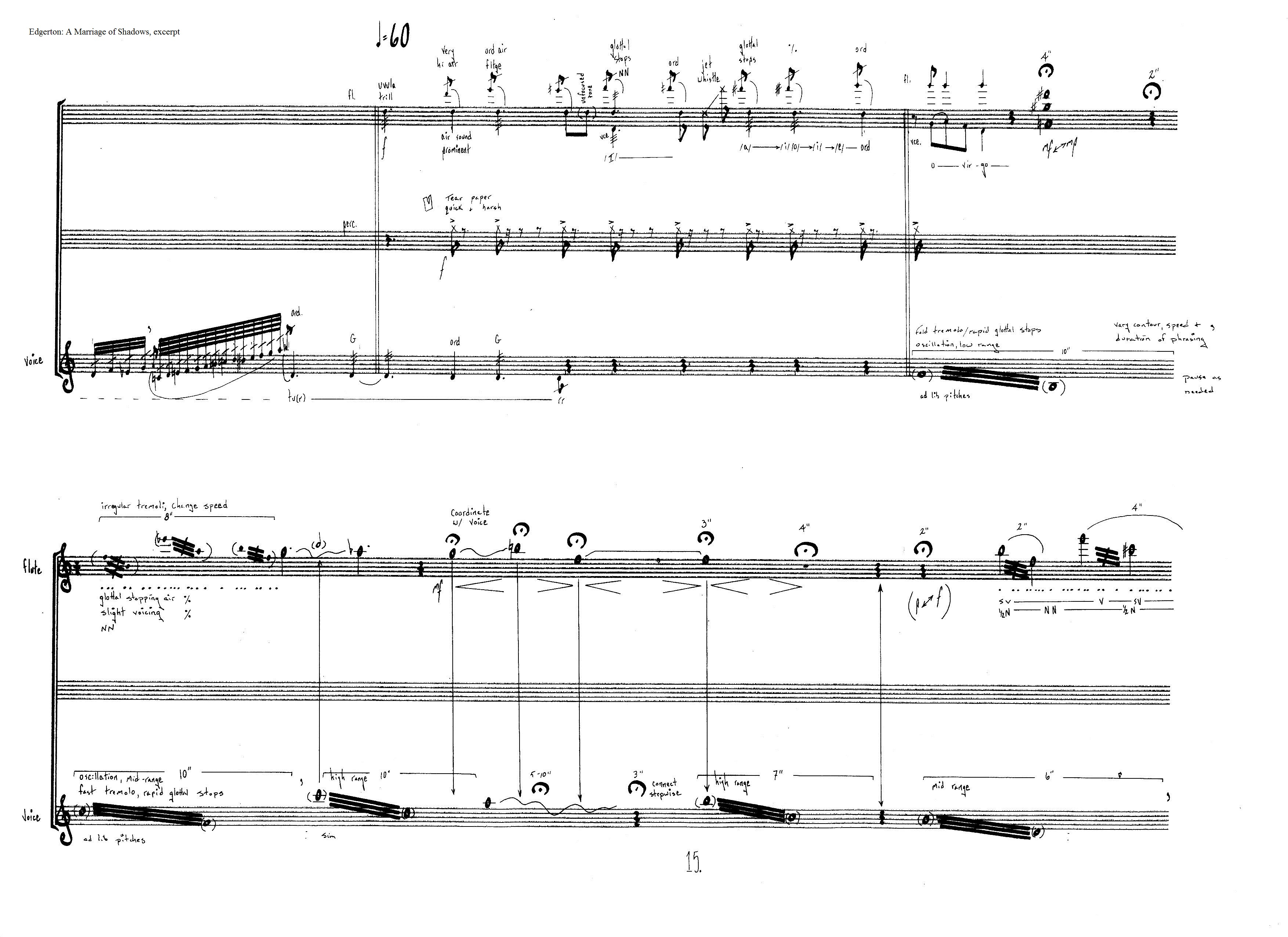
#77_A Marriage of Shadows, for fl, sax, gtr, perc, vce_movement 1, page 15

Opera/music theater

- #33__No!!!, for two voices, rope climbers and drummers (1996)
- #21__A Broken Collaboration, for solo actor, 3 voices, electric guitar and cello (1994)
- #19__The 15th Century Walled Garden – Apokatastasis, for solo percussion, mosh pit, geodesic dome, car hoods, rocks, metal and other objects (1993)
- #18__The Electric Meat Factory, for soprano, chanter, guitar, percussion, wall bass, electronic tape, spatialization in a three-story house played as an instrument (1993)
- #17__Fracture Zone: Clipperton et Ragusii, an underwater drama designed to be performed within the Clipperton Transform Fault in the Pacific Ocean (1993)
- #16__Fama Fraternitatis, for solo voice, assorted instruments, dancers and tunnelers (1992)
- #11__Hour History, an opera for four principal actors, 11 male voices, percussion ensemble (1989)

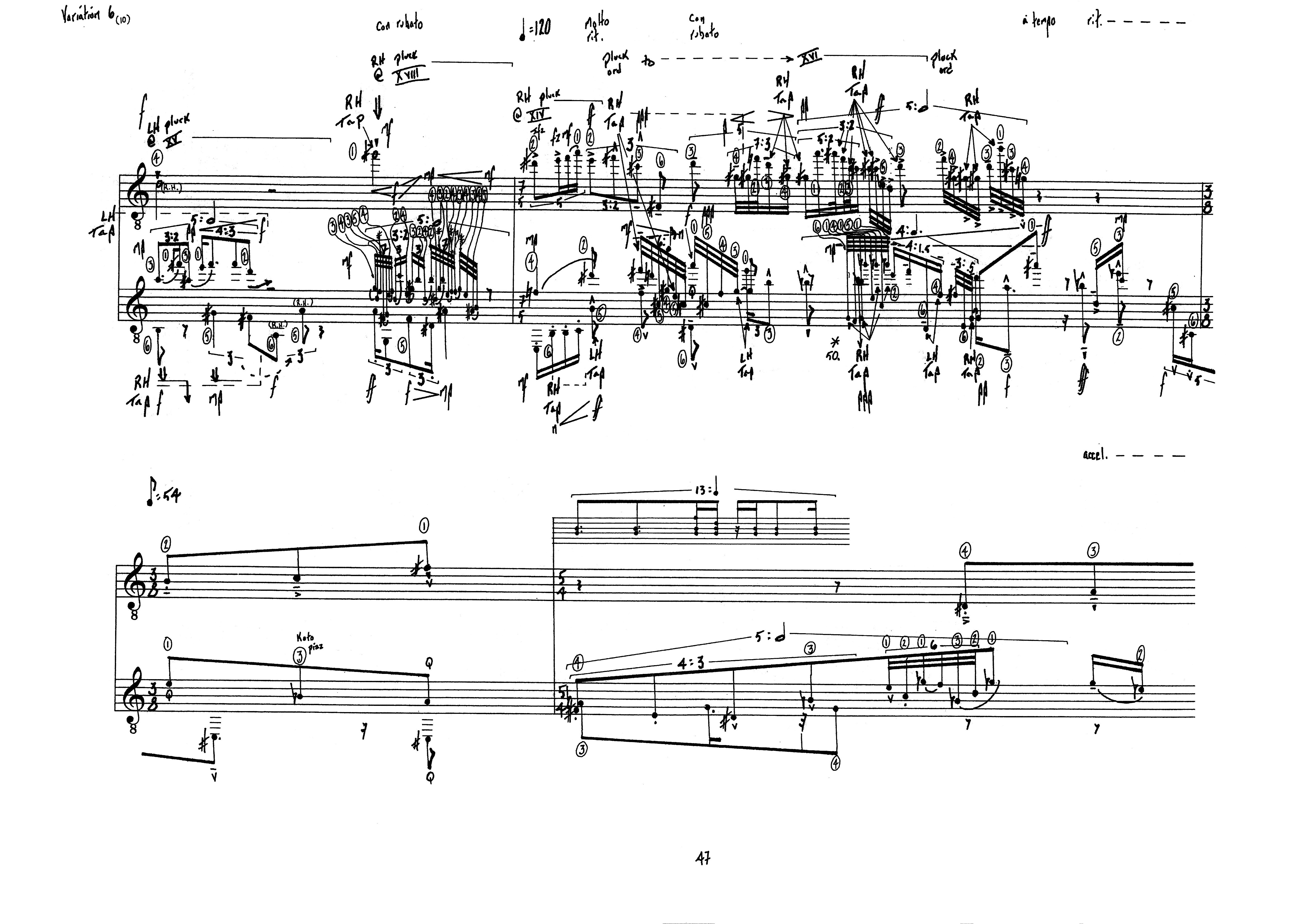
#72_Tempo Mental Rap, variation 6, page 47

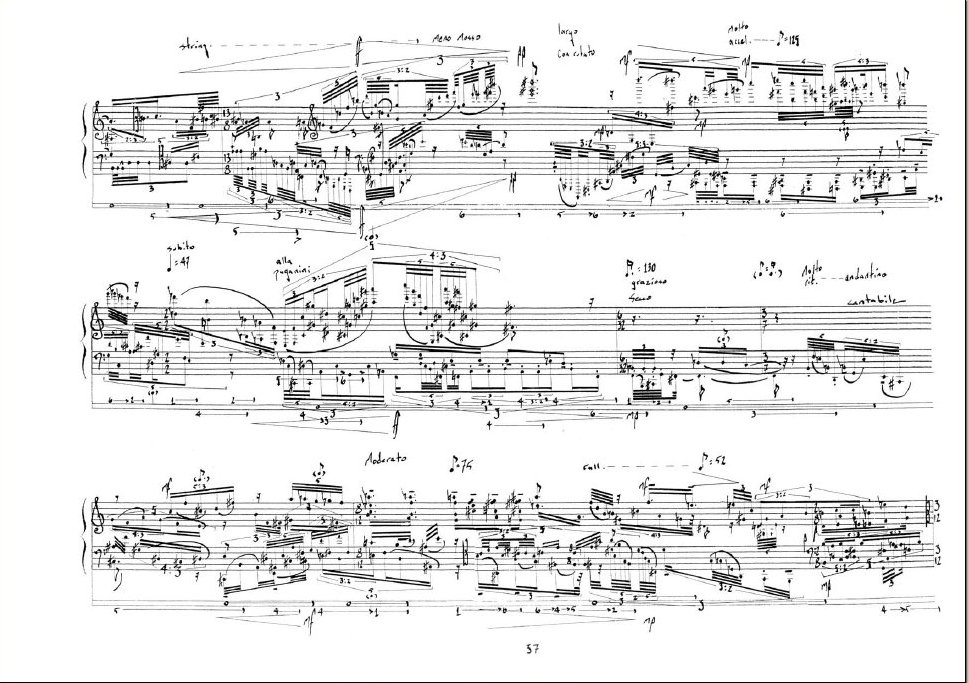
#70_1 sonata, for piano, page 37

Large ensemble

- #92__In Silence I Hide my Loudest Scream, for 9 players (A.Fl., B., Cl., Trpt., Tbn., Perc., 2 Vl., Vla., Vlc.) (2015)
- #85__Folk Songs, for voices and chamber ensemble (2010/2013)
- #75__fragmenta Scotia, for large chamber ensemble and voice (2007)

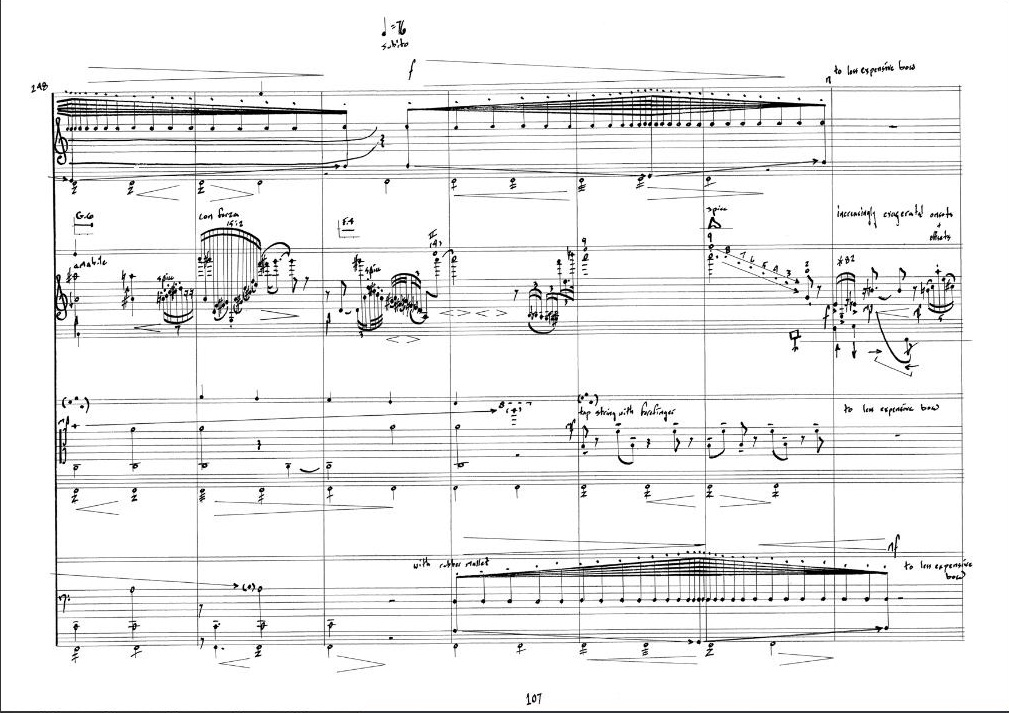
64 String Quartet 1; mmt5, p. 107

Chamber ensemble

- #90__Noise is interrupting my practice: Silence is when my reaction is quiet. Silence is my protest against the way things are, for piano and amplification (2014)
- #89__The Return of Takhi, the last feral horse, for B.Cl., Trpt., Tbn., Vce (2014)
- #78__Balkan Dance, for 4 blockflöte (tenor, bass F, grossbass C, Subbass F) (2008)
- #77__A Marriage of Shadows, for flute (a.fl), Alto (tenor) sax, percussion, gtr, voice (2008)
- #74__illusions, for e.hn, cl, bn, hn, tpt, tbn, pno, vla (2006)
- #73__adjusting to beams falling, for flute and violoncello (2006)
- #67__Kut, for sheng (or accordion/oboe), female voice, violin (2002)
- #66__Sangītaśiromani, for 7 strings (vln & vla) (2002)
- #64__String Quartet #1, for string quartet (2002)
- #63__Koli, for string quartet and bass voice (2001)
- #57__Samsara, for twenty strings (2000)
- #56__le Critérion, for woodwind quartet (fl, ob, cl, bsn) (2000/2008)
- #52__Pakji Studies, for wind, brass and percussion (1999)
- #51__Twelve Miniatures, for wind, brass and piano (1999)
- #50__Pakji, for wind ensemble (1999)
- #44__Agwara-Nanga-Wolof, for steel pans, African drums, brass and saxophone (1998)
- #39__A Holy Person Falls into the Nile as a Pelican, for clarinet and horn (1997)
- #38__Circles et Articulation, for trumpet & piano (1997)
- #37__l’histoire du petit Heure, for percussion ensemble (1997)
- #31__On Music, for flute and viola (1996)
- #28__Lincoln Shrine, for marimba and violin (1995)
- #23__XHAIN, for piano duo (1995/2008)
- #22__Regret of a Noiseless Sundering, for saxophone quartet (1995)
- #15__Net/Byrinth: Rec. Study 1, for trumpet, horn, and trombone (1991)
- #14__Michelle 8091-434, for bass clarinet, b. sax, tuba, double bass, trap set (1991)
- #13__Whose Land? (16’13) rock band and tape (1990)
- #12__The Hidden Thunder of Screaming Souls, for voice and viola (1989)
- #09__Unspoken Crime, for violin, violoncello and piano (1988)
- #08__Expansions 1a, for flute, clarinet, bass clarinet and bassoon (1988)
- #06__Current: The Eternal Mystery, for percussion ensemble (1987)
- #05__Ai, for trumpet, trombone, tuba (1987)
- #03__A Penny for the Young Guy, for narrator, voices, winds, brass, strings (1986)
- #02__Dwellers of the Southwest, for tenor and mixed ensemble (1986)

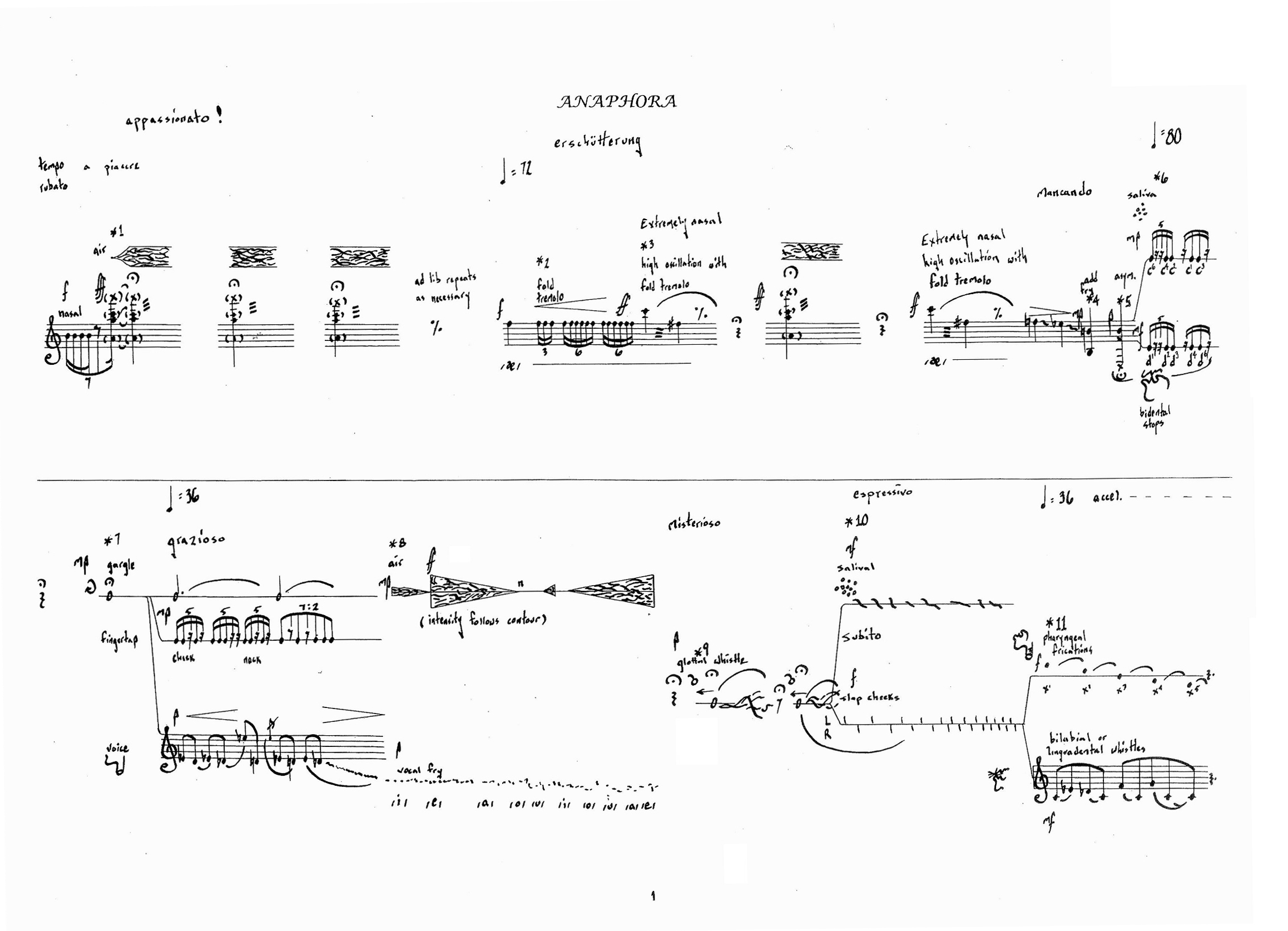
Anaphora, for solo voice, page 1

Solo instrument

- #91__THRUSH, for piano (2015)
- #86__2 Sonata, for alto flute (2011)
- #85.a_Ari(rang), for soprano sax (2010)
- #83__The Book of One Man Dead, for free-base accordion (2009)
- #79__The Oak at Mambre, for doublebass (2008)
- #72__Tempo Mental Rap, for guitar (2005)
- #71__Art from the Edge of the World, for oboe (2005)
- #70__1 sonata, for piano (2004)
- #65__Tractatus I, for solo oboe (2002)
- #55__Mamre, for violin (2000)
- #47__Schreistimme, for bayan (1998)
- #35__Apposte Messe, for air-driven organ (1996)
- #32__Giants, for solo violin (1996)
- #30__"...by the way, your name makes music...", for xylophone (1996)
- #26__David, not too Syl (i), for vibraphone (1995)
- #25__Songs of Vent, for multi-percussion solo (1995)
- #20__The Night of Brahman-The Dance of Fire, for solo violin (1994)
- #04__Expansions, for piano (1986)

Choral/vocal

- #88__abaGa baʁatur, for four voices (2014)
- #85.b_mélodie Coréen, for voice and piano (2012)
- #82__Cataphora – lulus brevicum, for solo voice (2009)
- #81__Desolate Land, for choir (2008)
- #80__Keltainen huone, for choir (2008)
- #76__DRAFT 1/25/2002, for solo voice and two female speaking voices (2007)
- #68__prāna, for four solo voices and non-stable drone (2002)
- #62__Anaphora, for solo voice (2001)
- #61__Divergence, for two voices and electronics (2001)
- #60__Cantor’s Dust, for solo voice and electronics (2001)
- #58__Kalevi Matus, for choir (2000)
- #54__Friedrich’s Comma, for two voices (1999)
- #49__KOSMOS, volume two on reinforced harmonics, for one to four voices (1998)
- #48__KOSMOS, volume one on articulation, for one to four voices (1998)
- #46__Azure Suite, for soprano and overtone singer (1998)
- #45__Taffy Twisters, for voice and percussion (1998)
- #43__Sirens, for choir (1998)
- #41__Lingua-Palatal #1, for two voices (1997)
- #40__24 October 1667, for marine trumpet and voice (1997)
- #36__Mit Unulgn Tri-Ien Psiiii iii, for five voices (1997)
- #34__Worcester Fragments, for four to six voices (1996)
- #27__Mountain Songs, for solo voice (1995)
- #24__Pedagogy Piece, for six voices (1995)

Electronic

- #69__A Little Watter, man, an electronic composition (2003)
- #59__The Elements of Risk in Creation, an electronic composition with optional voice (2001)
- #53__Wassermann, an electronic composition (1999)
- #29__Syale #1, an electronic composition (1995)
- #10__In America, an electronic composition (1989)
- #07__My Country, an electronic composition (1987)

== Scores ==
Publishers

- C. Allen Publications
- Conners Publications/C. P. Press Publications
- TUBA-Euphonium Press
- PRB Productions
- Uetz Music

== Book ==
- Michael Edward Edgerton. The 21st Century Voice: Contemporary and Traditional Extra-Normal Voice. Scarecrow Press. ISBN 0-8108-5354-X.

The text features a comprehensive discussion of extra-complex methods of vocal sound production, within an acoustic and physiologic framework. Most importantly the text and associated recordings propose methods for continued creative exploration. The book has received exceptional reviews and is now available from Scarecrow Press. Due to the comprehensive treatment of extra-complex vocal production within a scientific framework, the book has a broad appeal that extends beyond musical composition and performance to include voice science, acoustics, linguistics, computer modeling and more.
