= Carolla =

Carolla is a surname. Notable people with the surname include:

- Adam Carolla (born 1964), American radio personality, comedian, actor, and podcaster
- Gary Carolla, band member of Centory
- Sylvestro Carolla (1896–1970), Italian-American mob boss

== See also ==
- Carolle
