= Caralee =

Caralee is a given name, a female variant of Charles. Notable people with the name include:

- Caralee McElroy (born 1983), American multi-instrumentalist
- Caralee McLiesh, Australian economist

== See also ==
- Carlee
- Carolee
