= Carolle =

Carolle is a feminine given name. Notable people known by this name include the following:

== Given name ==
- Carolle Brabant, Canadian film executive
- Carolle J. Carter, penname of Carolle J. Kitchens (born 1934), American historian
- Carolle de Ste. Croix (born 1968), Canadian educator, researcher and political figure
- Carolle Zahi (born 1994), French sprinter

== Middle name ==
- Robin Carolle Brantley, full name of Robin Robinson (born 1957), Chicago news anchor

== See also ==
- Carole
- Carolee
- Caroll
- Carolla
- Carollo
- Fábio Carille
