= Coralli =

Coralli is a surname. Notable people with the surname include:

- Claudio Coralli (born 1983), Italian footballer
- Giulio Coralli (born 1641), Italian painter
- Jean Coralli (1779–1854), French dancer and choreographer

== See also ==
- Corallo
