= Irvin G. Wyllie =

American scholar (1920–1974)

Irvin Gordon Wyllie (3 January 1920 – 25 October 1974) was an American historian and professor.

Wyllie studied at Westminster College, Oberlin, and the University of Wisconsin-Madison, where he received his PhD in 1949. He taught at the University of Maryland and University of Missouri (where he was an American Association of University Professors chapter president), before returning to the University of Wisconsin, where he was the first Gordon E. Fox Professor of American Institutions, and chairman of the history department. He was a Ford fellow at Cornell, and a Fulbright lecturer at Gothenburg and Lund.

In 1966 he was appointed as the first chancellor of the newly created University of Wisconsin-Parkside (which at that time did not even have an official name), and served in that capacity until his 1974 death from a heart attack at the age of 54. The school's Wyllie Hall is named for him, and the Wyllie Society for Planned Giving was established at the University in his memory.

== Personal life ==
Born in Pittsburgh, Wyllie married Harriet Fairley, a fellow Westminster alumnus, in 1945; she worked in Madison's public library to help him get his Ph.D., and followed him as he moved from institution to institution.

He died October 25, 1974, at the age of 54 in his Kenosha County home of a heart attack, having been hospitalized the prior May from a previous attack. He was survived by his wife Harriett and three children; she died in 2011.

== Selected bibliography ==
- Wyllie, Irvin G. (1954). The Self-Made Man in America: The Myth of Rags to Riches. Rutgers University Press. OCLC 248341.
- Wyllie, Irvin G. (1959). Social Darwinism and the Businessman. Bobbs-Merrill. OCLC 4611514.
