= Dominic A. Cariello =

United States Army general

Dominic A. Cariello is a former brigadier general in the National Guard of the United States.

== Biography ==
Cariello obtained a B.S. in Mechanical Engineering from the University of Wisconsin–Parkside in 1992. As a civilian he works at a paving and construction manufacturer in Racine, Wisconsin.

== Career ==
Cariello originally enlisted in the United States Army Reserve in 1981 before transferring to the Wisconsin Army National Guard and was commissioned a second lieutenant in 1983. His assignments have included humanitarian work during Hurricane Katrina and a tour of duty in the War in Afghanistan.

Awards he has received include the Bronze Star Medal, the Meritorious Service Medal with three oak leaf clusters, the Army Commendation Medal, the Army Achievement Medal with oak leaf cluster, the Army Reserve Components Achievement Medal with silver oak leaf cluster and bronze oak leaf cluster, the National Defense Service Medal with service star, the Afghanistan Campaign Medal with two service stars, the Global War on Terrorism Service Medal, the Humanitarian Service Medal, the Armed Forces Reserve Medal with mobilization device and silver hourglass device, the Army Service Ribbon, the Overseas Service Ribbon, the NATO Medal, and the Combat Action Badge.
