= Corallo =

Corallo is a surname. Notable people with the surname include:

- Anthony Corallo (1913–2000), Italian-American mobster
- Mark Corallo (21st century), political communications and public relations professional
- Riccardo Corallo (born 1980), Italian footballer
- Salvatore Corallo (1928–2019), Italian politician

== See also ==
- Coralli
- Corallo (submarine)
