= Carroll =

Carroll may refer to:

== People ==
- Carroll (given name)
- Carroll (surname)
- O'Carroll, also known as Carroll, a Gaelic Irish clan
- Mac Cearbhaill, anglicised as Carroll, a Gaelic Irish clan

== Places ==
=== Australia ===
- Carroll, New South Wales

=== United States ===
- Carroll, Iowa
- Carroll, Nebraska
- Carroll, New Hampshire
- Carroll, New York
- Carroll, Ohio
- Carroll, Texas
- Carroll County (disambiguation), various
- Carroll Plantation, Maine
- Carroll Township (disambiguation), various
- Carroll Valley, Pennsylvania
- East Carroll Parish, Louisiana
- East Carroll Township, Cambria County, Pennsylvania
- West Carroll Parish, Louisiana
- Mount Carroll, Illinois

=== Other ===
- Carroll (crater), a crater on the far side of the Moon unofficially named by the Artemis II crew

== Education ==
- Carroll College (Montana)
- Carroll University, Waukesha, Wisconsin
- John Carroll University, Cleveland, Ohio
- Carroll Hall (University of Notre Dame), residence hall
- Carroll School of Management, within Boston College

== Court cases ==
- R v Carroll, Australian High Court case
- Carroll v. United States, which decided that automobile passengers have a reduced expectation of privacy
- United States v. Carroll Towing Co., precedent-setting United States appeals court case

== Companies ==
- Carroll's, Irish tobacco company
- Carroll & Graf Publishers, American book publisher
- Carroll Group, a defunct British property company

== See also ==
- Carol (disambiguation)
- Carrell (disambiguation)
- Carrol
- Caroll
- Carrols (disambiguation)
