= Carole =

Carole is a feminine given name (see Carl for more information) and occasionally a surname.

Carole is a given name and a surname. Notable people with the name include:

== Given name ==
- Carole Achache (1952–2016), French writer, photographer and actress
- Carole B. Balin (born 1964), American Reform rabbi, professor of Jewish history
- Carole Baskin (born 1961), American television personality
- Carole Bayer Sager (born 1944), American lyricist, singer, songwriter, painter
- Carole Byard (1941–2017), American visual artist, illustrator, and photographer
- Carole Bouquet (born 1958), French actress, fashion model
- Carole Bureau-Bonnard (born 1965), French politician
- Carole Cadwalladr (born 1969), British author and investigative journalist
- Carole Cains (born 1943), Australian former politician
- Carole Cook (1924–2023), American actress
- Carole Crawford (1943–2024), Jamaican model, Miss World 1963
- Carole David (born 1954), Canadian poet and novelist
- Carole Davis (born 1958) British model and actress
- Carole Delga (born 1971), French politician
- Carole Demas (born 1940), American actress
- Carole Doyle Peel (1934–2016), American visual artist
- Carole Eastman (1934–2004), American actress and screenwriter
- Carole Easton, British psychotherapist
- Carole Feuerman (born 1945), American artist, hyper-realistic sculptor
- Carole Ann Ford (born 1940), British Actress
- Carole Freeman (born 1949), Canadian politician
- Carole Gaessler (born 1968), French television journalist
- Carole Goble (born 1961), British academic and computer scientist
- Carole Grandjean (born 1983), French politician
- Carole Graves (born 1938), American politician
- Carole Gray (born 1938), Zimbabwean former dancer and actress
- Carole Harris (born 1943), African American designer
- Carole Hill, American anthropologist and professor
- Carole Jacques (born 1960), Canadian politician from Quebec
- Carole Jahme, British biographer
- Carole James (born 1957), Canadian politician, former public administrator
- Carole Joffe, American sociologist
- Carole Jordan (1941–2026), British physicist, astrophysicist, astronomer and academic
- Carole King (born 1942), American singer-songwriter
- Carole Knight (born 1957), British table tennis player
- Carole Landis (1919–1948), American actress
- Carole Lavallée (1954–2021), Canadian politician from Quebec
- Carole Lombard (1908–1942), American actress
- Carole Malone (born 1954), British journalist and political commentator
- Carole Maso, American novelist and writer
- Carole LaBonne, American scientist
- Carole Poirier (born 1958), Canadian politician
- Carole Radziwill (born 1963), American journalist, author, and reality television personality
- Carole Richards (1922–2007), American singer
- Carole Robertson, victim of the 1963 16th Street Baptist Church bombing
- Carole Roussopoulos (1945–2009) Swiss film director and feminist
- Carole Shelley (1939–2018), English actress
- Carole Shepheard (born 1945), New Zealand artist
- Carole Ward Allen, American politician, professor and political consultant
- Carole Zahi (born 1994), French sprinter

== Surname ==
- Lionel Carole (born 1991), French footballer
- Sébastien Carole (born 1982), French footballer

== Other uses ==
- Carole, Medieval dance

== See also ==
- Carle (disambiguation)
- Carol
- Carola
- Carolle
- Carrol
- Carroll
- Caroly (name)
