= Crelle =

Crelle may refer to:

- August Leopold Crelle (1780–1855), German mathematician
- Crelle's Journal, or simply Crelle, a mathematical journal named after August Leopold Crelle

== See also ==
- Crell, a surname
- Lorenz Florenz Friedrich von Crell (1744–1816), German chemist
  - Crell's Annalen, a German chemistry journal
