= Crell =

Crell is a surname. Notable people with the surname include:

- Jan Crell or Johannes Crellius (1590–1633), Polish and German theologian
- Lorenz Florenz Friedrich von Crell (1744–1816), German chemist
- Nicholas Crell or Nikolaus Krell (1551–1601), chancellor of the elector of Saxony
- Samuel Crell or Samuel Crellius (1660–1747), Arian philosopher and theologian, pastor of the church of the Polish Brethren

== See also ==
- Krzysztof Crell-Spinowski (1622–1680), Arian theologian, pastor of the church of the Polish Brethren
- Crell Moset, fictitious Cardassian exobiologist in "Nothing Human", the 102nd episode of Star Trek: Voyager
- Carell
- Carrel
- Carrell
- Crelly
- Criella
- Kurell
- Querelle
