= Carl Wilhelm Scheele =

Swedish German chemist who discovered oxygen (1742–1786)

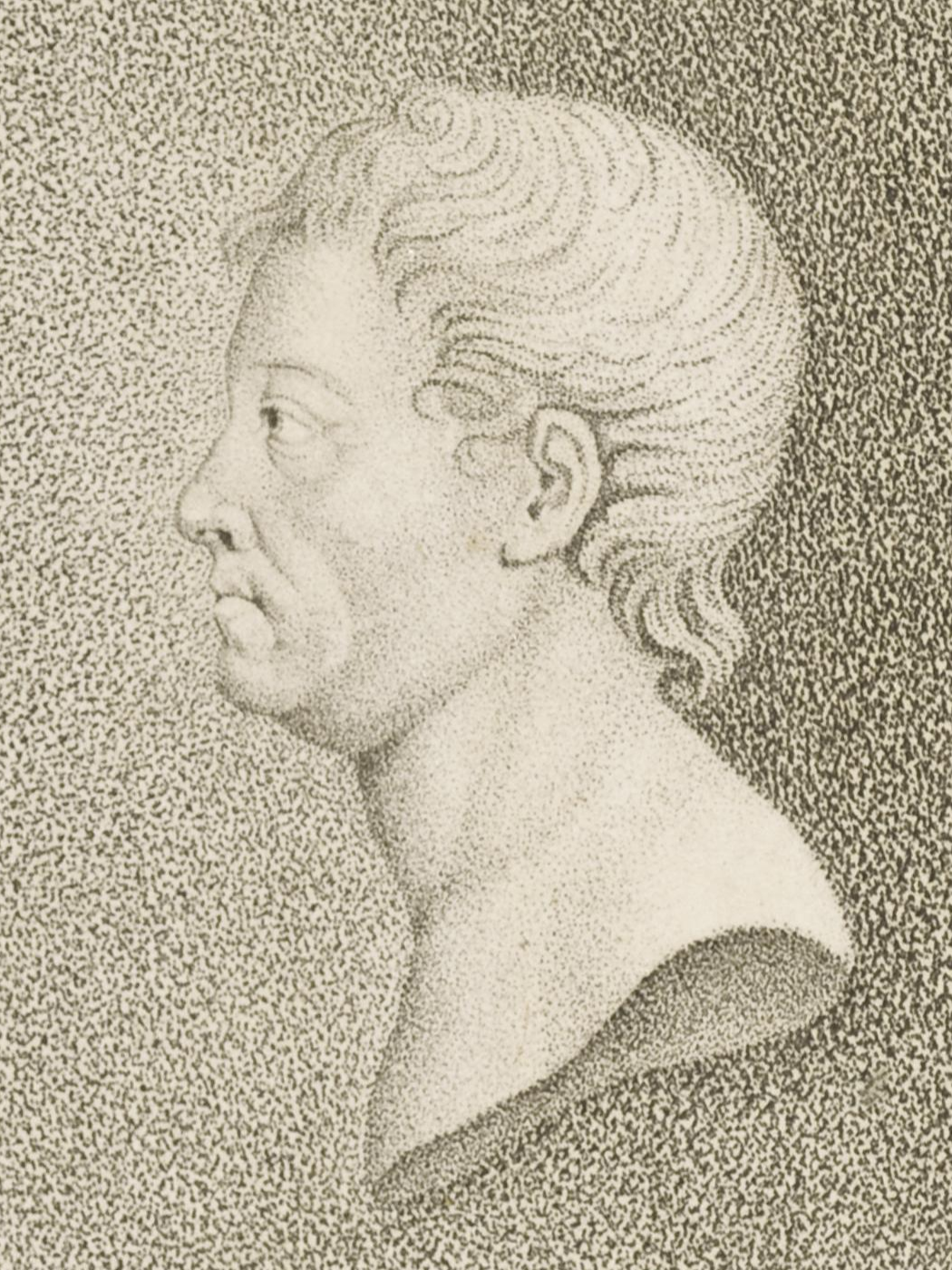
- Portrait engraving of Scheele based on a 1789 commemorative medal, c. 1800
- Born: 9 December 1742; Stralsund, Swedish Pomerania
- Died: 21 May 1786 (aged 43); Köping, Sweden
- Known for: Discovered oxygen (independently), molybdenum, manganese, barium, chlorine, tungsten and more
- Scientific career
- Fields: Chemistry

Carl Wilhelm Scheele (German: [ˈʃeːlə], Swedish: [ˈɧêːlɛ]; 9 December 1742 – 21 May 1786) was a German-Swedish pharmaceutical chemist.

Scheele discovered oxygen (although Joseph Priestley published his findings first), and identified the elements molybdenum, tungsten, barium, nitrogen, and chlorine, among others. Scheele discovered organic acids tartaric, oxalic, uric, lactic, and citric, as well as hydrofluoric, hydrocyanic, and arsenic acids. He preferred speaking German to Swedish his whole life, as German was commonly spoken among Swedish pharmacists.

Doctors said that he died of mercury poisoning, having spent his life working as a chemist.

== Biography ==
Scheele was born in Stralsund, in western Pomerania, which at the time was a Swedish Dominion inside the Holy Roman Empire. Scheele's father, Joachim (or Johann) Christian Scheele, was a grain dealer and brewer from a respected Pomeranian family. His mother was Margaretha Eleanore Warnekros.

Friends of Scheele's parents taught him the art of reading prescriptions and the meaning of chemical and pharmaceutical signs. Then, in 1757, at the age of fourteen, Carl was sent to Gothenburg as an apprentice pharmacist to another family friend and apothecary, Martin Andreas Bauch. Scheele retained this position for eight years. During this time he ran experiments late into the night and read the works of Nicolas Lemery, Caspar Neumann, Johann von Löwenstern-Kunckel and Georg Ernst Stahl (the champion of the phlogiston theory). Much of Scheele's later theoretical speculations were based upon Stahl.

In 1765 Scheele worked under the progressive and well-informed apothecary C. M. Kjellström in Malmö, and became acquainted with Anders Jahan Retzius who was a lecturer at the University of Lund and later a professor of chemistry at Stockholm. Scheele arrived in Stockholm between 1767 and 1769 and worked as a pharmacist. During this period he discovered tartaric acid and with his friend, Retzius, studied the relation of quicklime to calcium carbonate. While in the capital, he also became acquainted with figures including Abraham Bäck, Peter Jonas Bergius, Bengt Bergius and Carl Friedreich von Schultzenheim.

In the fall of 1770 Scheele became director of the laboratory of the great pharmacy of Locke, at Uppsala, about 65 km (40 mi) north of Stockholm. The laboratory supplied chemicals to Professor of Chemistry Torbern Bergman. A friendship developed between Scheele and Bergman after Scheele analyzed a reaction which Bergman and his assistant, Johan Gottlieb Gahn, could not resolve. The reaction was between melted saltpetre and acetic acid that produced a red vapor. Further study of this reaction later led to Scheele's discovery of oxygen (see "The theory of phlogiston" below). Based upon this friendship and respect, Scheele was given free use of Bergman's laboratory. Both men were profiting from their working relationship. In 1774 Scheele was nominated by Peter Jonas Bergius to be a member of the Royal Swedish Academy of Sciences and was elected 4 February 1775. In 1775 Scheele also managed for a short time a pharmacy in Köping. Between the end of 1776 and the beginning of 1777 Scheele established his own business there.

On 29 October 1777, Scheele took his seat for the first and only time at a meeting of the Academy of Sciences and on 11 November passed the examination as apothecary before the Royal Medical College, doing so with the highest honours. After his return to Köping he devoted himself, outside of his business, to scientific researches which resulted in a long series of important papers.

Isaac Asimov called him "hard-luck Scheele" because he made a number of chemical discoveries that were later credited to others.

== Existing theories before Scheele ==
By the time he was a teenager, Scheele had learned the dominant theory of gases which in the 1770s was the phlogiston theory. Phlogiston, classified as "matter of fire", was supposed to be released from any burning material, and when it was exhausted, combustion would stop. When Scheele discovered oxygen he called it "fire air" as it supported combustion. Scheele explained oxygen using phlogistical terms because he did not believe that his discovery disproved the phlogiston theory.

Before Scheele made his discovery of oxygen, he studied air. Air was thought to be an element that made up the environment in which chemical reactions took place but did not interfere with the reactions. Scheele's investigation of air enabled him to conclude that air was a mixture of "fire air" and "foul air"; in other words, a mixture of two gases. Scheele performed numerous experiments in which he heated substances such as saltpetre (potassium nitrate), manganese dioxide, heavy metal nitrates, silver carbonate and mercuric oxide. In all of these experiments, he isolated the same gas: his "fire air", which he believed combined with phlogiston in materials to be released during heat-releasing reactions.

However, his first publication, Chemische Abhandlung von der Luft und dem Feuer, was delivered to the printer Swederus in 1775, but not published until 1777, at which time both Joseph Priestley and Antoine Lavoisier had already published their experimental data and conclusions concerning oxygen and the phlogiston theory. Scheele was credited for finding oxygen with two other people, Joseph Priestley and Antoine Lavoisier. The first English edition, Chemical Observation and Experiments on Air and Fire was published in 1780, with an introduction "Chemical Treatise on Air and Fire".

== The theory of phlogiston ==
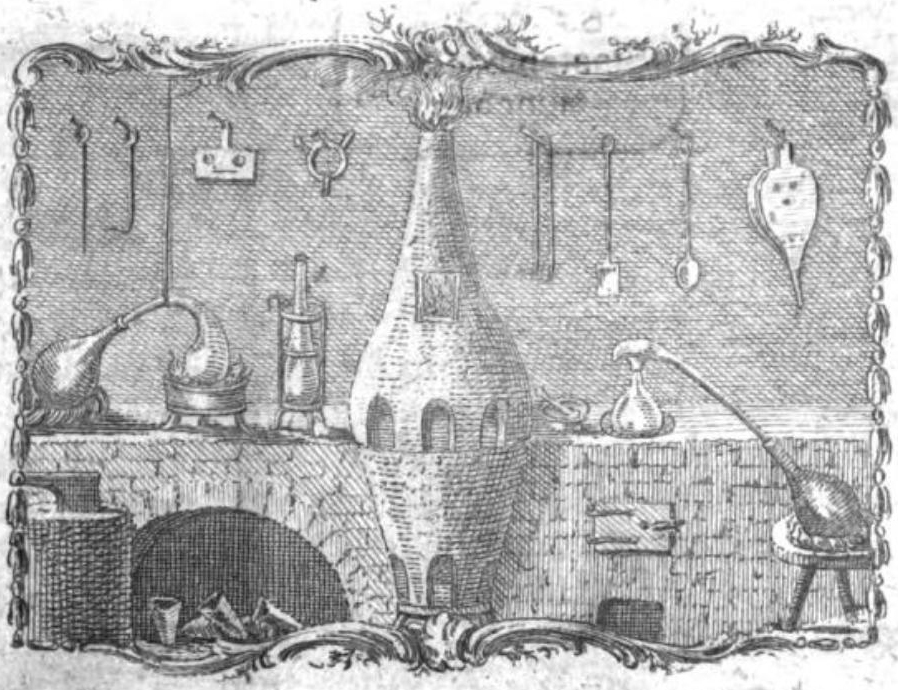
Engraving on the title page of Scheele's Chemical Treatise on Air and Fire (1777)(d. Königl. Schwed. Acad. d. Wissenschaft Mitgliedes, Chemische Abhandlung von der Luft und dem Feuer)

Scheele achieved prolific and important results without the expensive laboratory equipment to which his Parisian contemporary Antoine Lavoisier was accustomed. Through the studies of Lavoisier, Priestley, Scheele, and others, chemistry was made a standardized field with consistent procedures. Although Scheele was unable to grasp the significance of his discovery of the substance that Lavoisier later named oxygen, his work was essential for the abandonment of the long-held theory of phlogiston.

Scheele's study of the gas not yet named oxygen was prompted by a complaint by Torbern Olof Bergman, a professor at Uppsala University who would eventually become Scheele's friend. Bergman informed Scheele that the saltpeter he had purchased from Scheele's employer, after long heating, produced red vapors (now known to be nitrogen dioxide) when it came into contact with acetic acid. Scheele's quick explanation was that the saltpeter had absorbed phlogiston with the heat (had been reduced to nitrite, in modern terms) and gave off a new phlogisticated gas as an active principle when combined with an acid (even a weak acid).

Bergman next suggested that Scheele analyze the properties of manganese(IV) oxide. It was through his studies of manganese(IV) oxide that Scheele developed his concept of "fire air" (his name for oxygen). He ultimately obtained oxygen by heating mercuric oxide, silver carbonate, magnesium nitrate, and other nitrate salts. Scheele wrote about his findings to Lavoisier who was able to see the significance of the results. His discovery of oxygen (ca. 1771) was chronologically earlier than the corresponding work of Priestley and Lavoisier, but he did not publish this discovery until 1777, after both of his rivals had published.

Although Scheele would always believe in some form of the phlogiston theory, his work reduced phlogiston to an unusually simple form, complicated only by the fact that chemists of Scheele's day still believed that light and heat were elements and were to be found in combination with them. Thus, Scheele assumed that hydrogen was composed of phlogiston (a reducing principle lost when objects were burned) plus heat. Scheele speculated that his fire air or oxygen (which he found the active part of air, estimating it to compose one quarter of air) combined with the phlogiston in objects to produce either light or heat (light and heat were presumed to be composed of differing proportions of phlogiston and oxygen).

When other chemists later showed water is produced when burning hydrogen and that rusting of metals added weight to them and that passing water over hot iron gave hydrogen, Scheele modified his theory to suggest that oxygen was the salt (or "saline principle" of water), and that when added to iron, water was reproduced, which added weight to the iron as rust.

== New elements and compounds ==
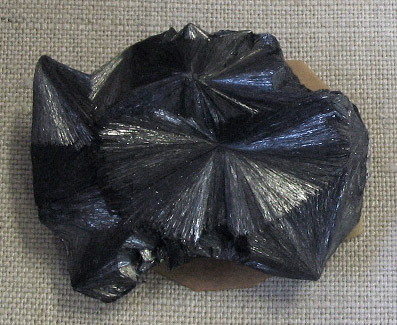
Pyrolusite, or MnO_{2}

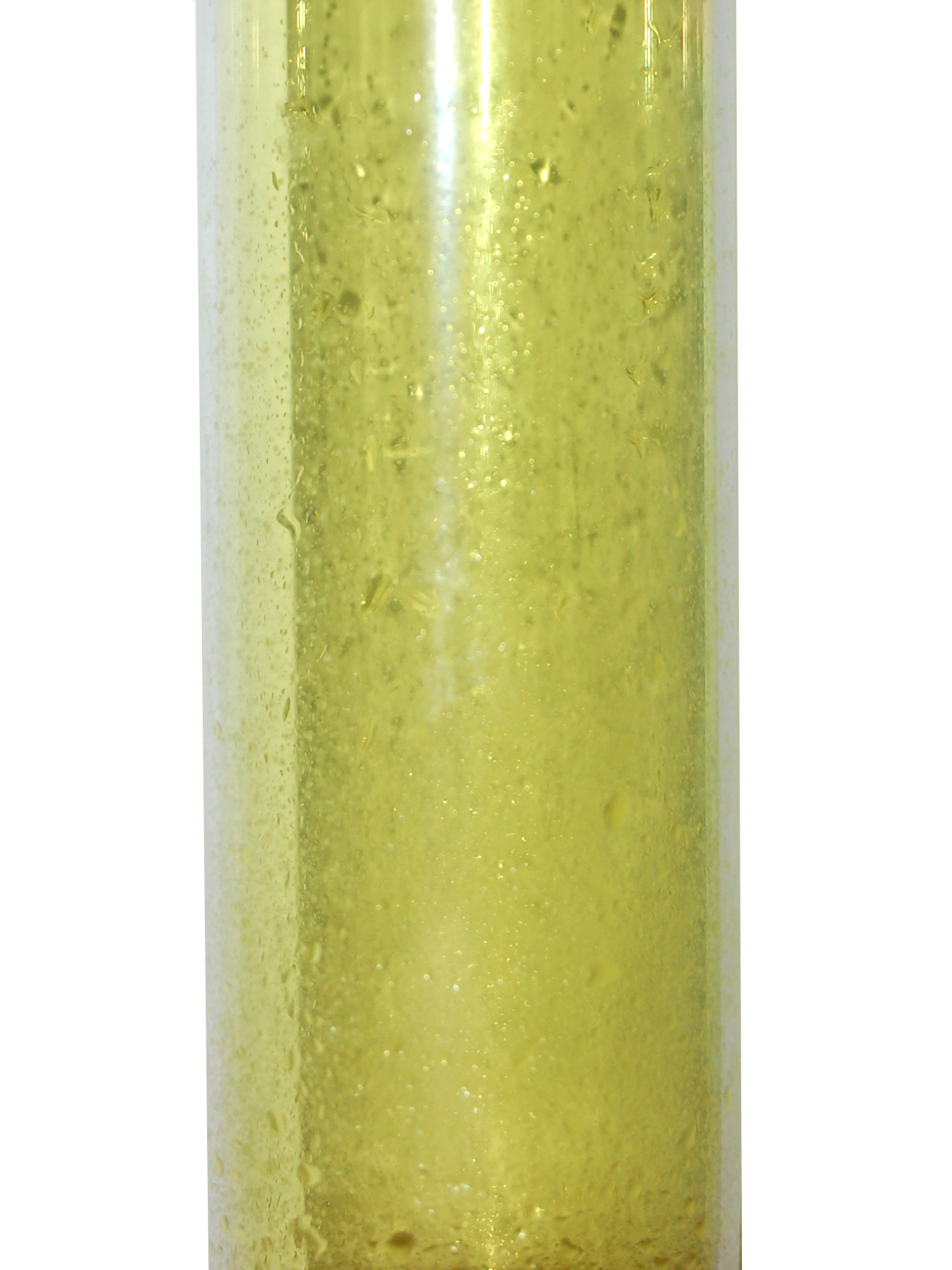
Chlorine gas

In addition to his joint recognition for the discovery of oxygen, Scheele is argued to have been the first to discover other chemical elements such as barium (1772), manganese (1774), molybdenum (1778), and tungsten (1781), as well as several chemical compounds, including citric acid, lactic acid, glycerol, hydrogen cyanide (also known, in aqueous solution, as prussic acid), hydrogen fluoride, and hydrogen sulfide (1777). In addition, he discovered a process similar to pasteurization, along with a means of mass-producing phosphorus (1769), leading Sweden to become one of the world's leading producers of matches.

Scheele made one other very important scientific discovery in 1774, arguably more revolutionary than his isolation of oxygen. He identified lime, silica, and iron in a specimen of pyrolusite (impure manganese dioxide) given to him by his friend, Johann Gottlieb Gahn, but could not identify an additional component (this was the manganese, which Scheele recognized was present as a new element, but could not isolate). When he treated the pyrolusite with hydrochloric acid over a warm sand bath, a yellow-green gas with a strong odor was produced. He found that the gas sank to the bottom of an open bottle and was denser than ordinary air. He also noted that the gas was not soluble in water. It turned corks a yellow color and removed all color from wet, blue litmus paper and some flowers. He called this gas with bleaching abilities, "dephlogisticated muriatic acid" (dephlogisticated hydrochloric acid, or oxidized hydrochloric acid). Eventually, Sir Humphry Davy named the gas chlorine, with reference to its pale green colour.

Chlorine's bleaching properties were eventually turned into an industry by Berzelius, and became the foundation of a second industry of disinfection and deodorization of putrefied tissue and wounds (including wounds in living humans) in the hands of Labarraque, by 1824.

== Death ==
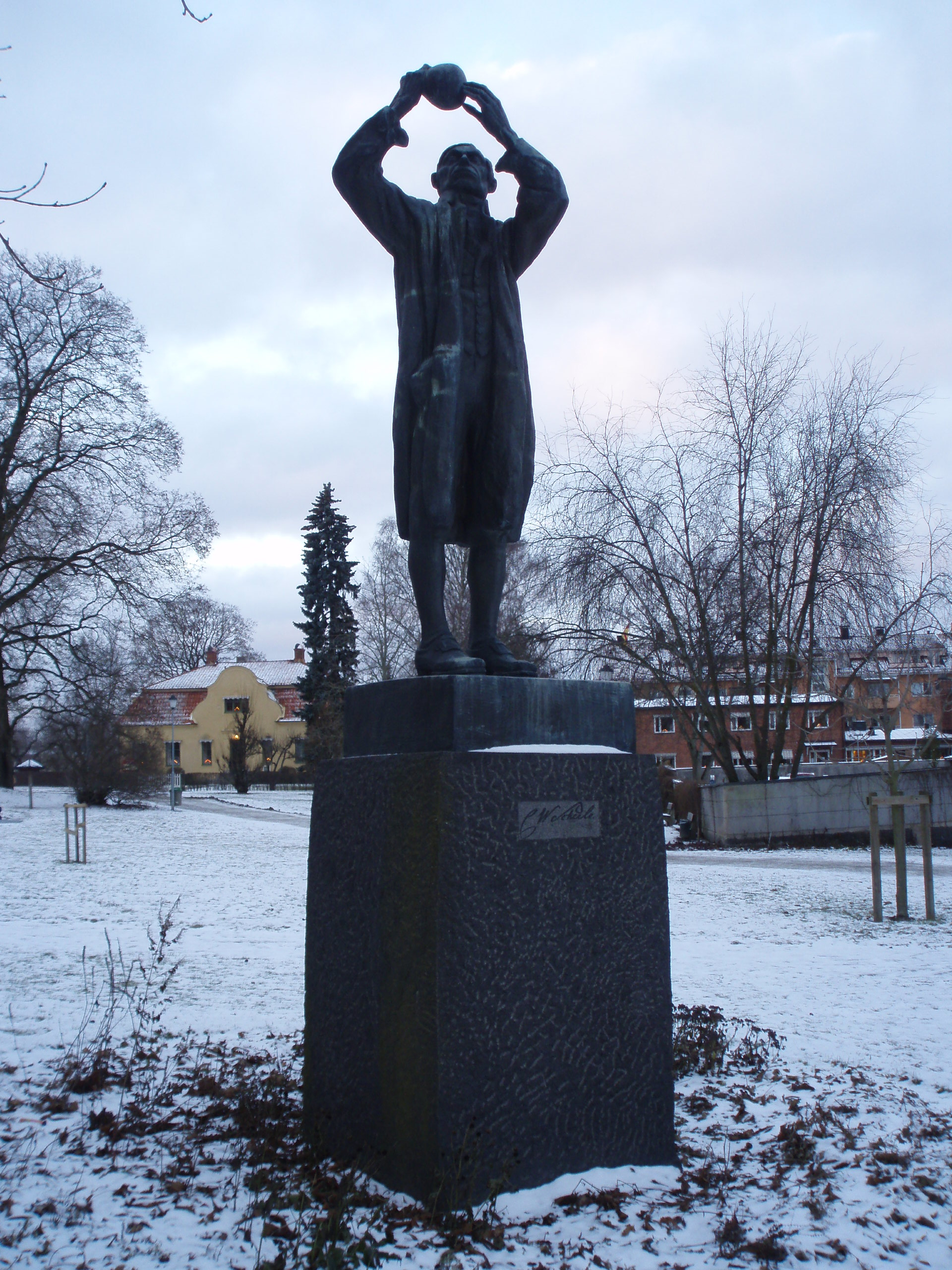
Statue of Scheele in Köping, Sweden

In the fall of 1785, Scheele began to suffer from symptoms described as kidney disease. In early 1786, he also contracted a disease of the skin, which, combined with his kidney problems, so enfeebled him that he could foresee an early death. With that in mind, he married the widow of his predecessor, Pohl, two days before he died, so that he could pass undisputed title to his pharmacy and his possessions to her.

While Scheele's experiments generated substances which have long since been found to be hazardous, the compounds and elements he used to start his experiments were dangerous to begin with, especially heavy metals. Like most of his contemporaries, in an age where there were few methods of chemical characterisation, Scheele would smell and taste any new substances he discovered. Cumulative exposure to arsenic, mercury, lead, and their compounds and, perhaps, hydrofluoric acid, which he had discovered, as well as other substances, took their toll on Scheele. He died at the early age of 43, on 21 May 1786, at his home in Köping.

== Published papers ==
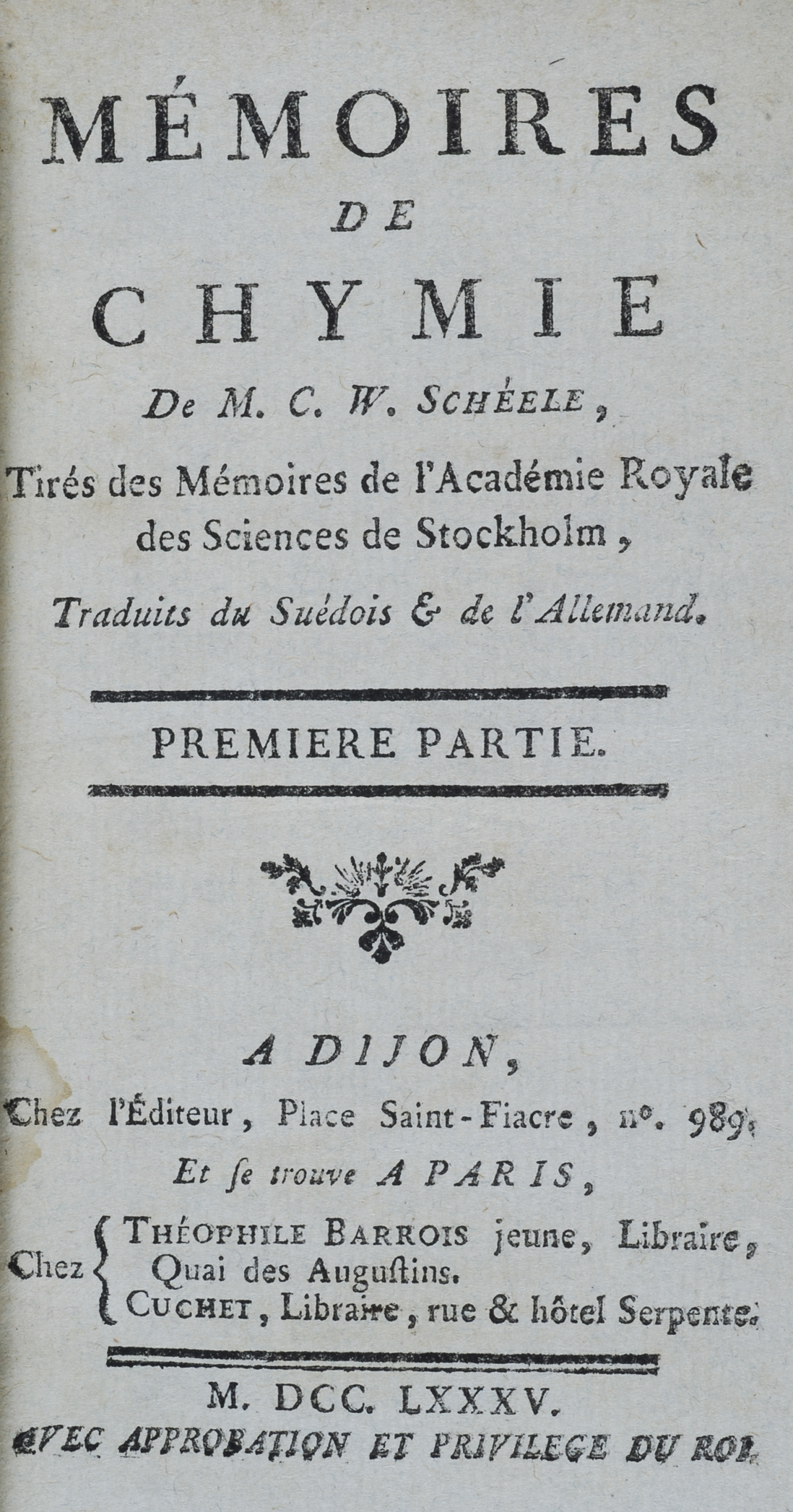
Mémoires de chymie, 1785, French translation by Mme. Claudine Picardet

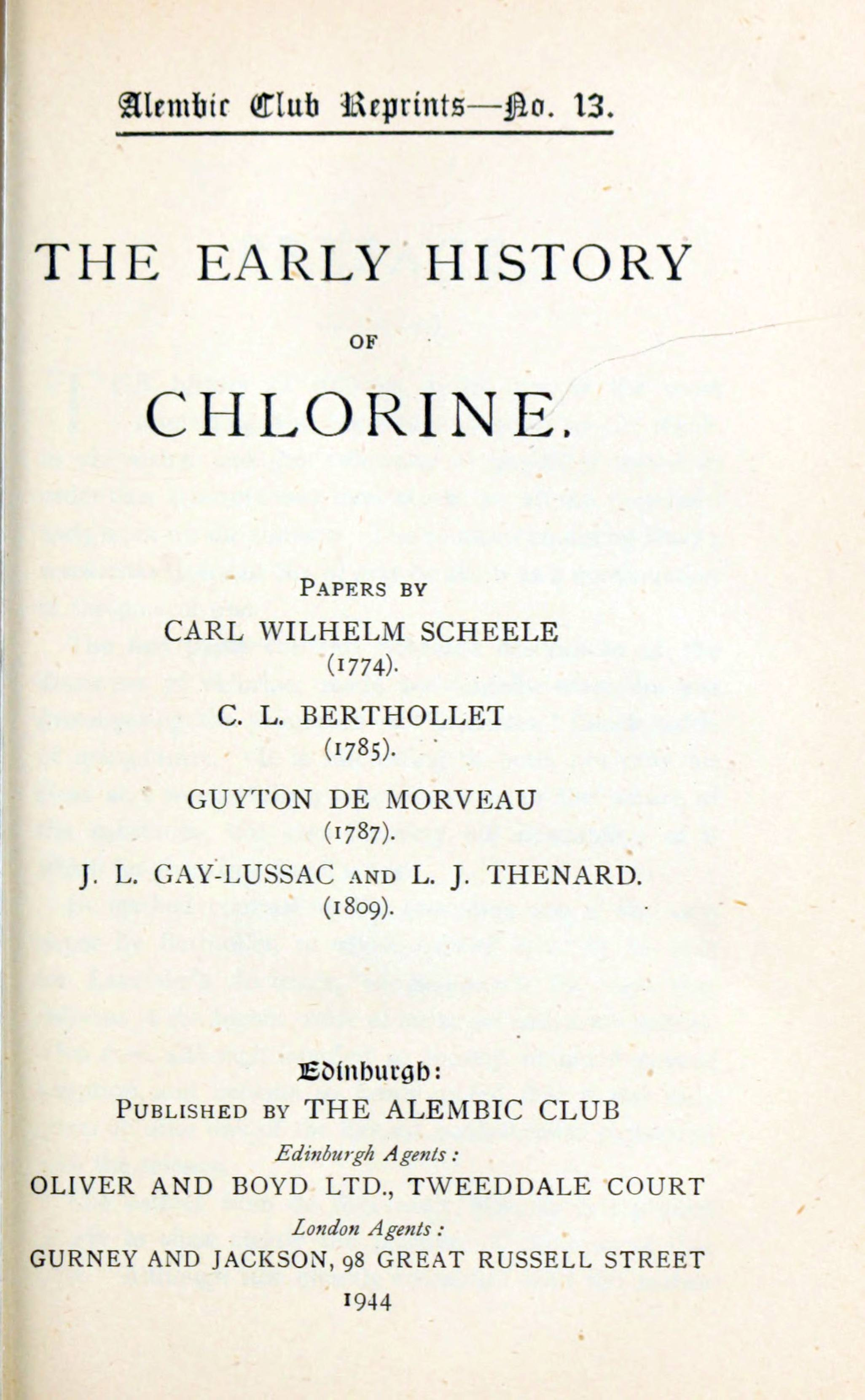
Early history of chlorine, 1944

All of the following papers were published by Scheele within a span of fifteen years.

1. (1771) Fluospar and its Acid
2. (1774) "Braunstein" or Magnesia [ Manganese ], two papers
3. (1775) Benzoin Salt [ Benzoic Acid ]
4. Arsenic and its Acid
5. Silica, Alumina, and Alum
6. Urinary Calculi
7. (1777) Chemical Treatise on Air and Fire
8. (1778) Wet Process for Preparing Mercurius dulcis [ Calomel ]
9. Simple Process for Preparing Pulvis Algarothi [ oxychloride of antimony ]
10. Molybdenum
11. (1778) Preparation of a New Green Color
12. (1779) On the Quantity of Pure Air daily present in the Atmosphere
13. Decomposition of Neutral Salts by Lime or Iron
14. Plumbago
15. Heavy spar
16. (1780) Fluospar
17. Milk and its Acid
18. Acid of Milk sugar
19. On the Relationship of Bodies
20. (1781) Tungsten
21. The Combustible Substance in Crude Lime
22. Preparation of White Lead
23. (1782) Ether
24. Preservation of Vinegar
25. Coloring Matter in Berlin Blue
26. (1783) Berlin Blue
27. Peculiar Sweet Principle from Oils and Fats [ Glycerin ]
28. (1784) Attempt to Crystallize Lemon juice
29. Constituents of Rhubarb-earth [ Calcium Oxalate ] and Preparation of Acetosella Acid [ Oxalic Acid ]
30. The Coloring "Middle-salt" of "Blood lye" [Yellow Prussiate of Potassium]
31. Air-acid [ Carbonic Acid ]; Benzoic Acid. Lapis infernalis ("Air-acid" is Carbon dioxide)
32. Sweet Principle from Oils and Fats. Air-acid
33. (1785) Acid of Fruits, especially of Raspberry
34. Phosphate of Iron; and Pearl-salt
35. Occurrence of Rhubarb-earth [see 29] in various Plants
36. Preparation of Magnesia alba
37. Fulminating Gold. Corn oil [ Fusel oil ]. Calomel
38. Air-acid
39. Lead amalgam
40. Vinegar-naphtha
41. Lime. Ammonia or Volatile Alkali
42. Malic Acid and Citric Acid
43. Air, Fire, and Water
44. (1786) The Essential Salt of Galls [ Gallic Acid ]
45. Nitric Acid
46. Oxide of Lead. Fuming Sulphuric Acid
47. Pyrophorus
48. Peculiarities of Hydrofluoric Acid.

Scheele's papers appeared first in the Transactions of the Swedish Academy of Sciences, and in various periodicals such as Lorenz Florenz Friedrich von Crell's Chemische Annalen. Scheele's work was collected and published in four languages beginning with Mémoires de Chymie by Mme. Claudine Picardet in 1785 and Chemical Essays by Thomas Beddoes in 1786, followed by Latin and German. Another English translation was published by Dr Leonard Dobbin, in 1931.

== See also ==
- Scheelite
- Scheele's Green
- Chemical revolution
- Pharmacy
- Pneumatic chemistry
- List of independent discoveries
