= Carryl =

Carryl is a surname and given name. Notable people with the name are as follows:

== Surname ==
- Charles E. Carryl (1841–1920), American businessman and author
- June Carryl (born 1967), American actress and playwright
- Guy Wetmore Carryl (1873–1904), American author, poet, and humorist
- Mary Carryl (Unknown – 1809), Irish servant

== Given name ==
- Carryl Thomas (born 17 May 1977) is an English actress

== See also ==
- Caral
- Carel
- Carell
- Caril
- Carol (disambiguation)
- Caroll
- Caryl
