= Carell =

Carell is a surname. Notable people with the surname include:

- Lianella Carell (1927–2000), Italian film actress and screenwriter
- Monroe J. Carell Jr. (1932–2008), American businessman and philanthropist
- Nancy Carell (born 1966), American actress, comedian and writer. Wife of Steve Carell
- Paul Carell (1911–1997), German non-fiction writer
- Steve Carell (born 1962), American comedian, actor, producer and writer
- Thomas Carell (born 1966), German biochemist

== See also ==
- Caral
- Carel
- Carrel
- Carrell
- Caril
- Carol (given name)
- Caroll
- Carrol
- Carroll
- Caryl
- Caryll
- Carryl
