= Caryll =

Caryll is both a given name and a surname.

== Given name ==
- Caryll Houselander (1901–1954), woodcarver and ecclesiastical artist
- Caryll Molyneux, 3rd Viscount Molyneux (1624–1699), English army officer

== Surname ==
- Billy Caryll of Billy Caryll and Hilda Mundy (1892–1953), British husband-and-wife comedy duo
- John Caryll (senior) (1625–1711), English Baron
- John Caryll the younger (1667–1736), English Baron
- John Baptist Caryll (1713–1788), English Baron
- Ivan Caryll (1861–1921), Belgian composer

== See also ==
- Caral
- Carel
- Carell
- Caril
- Carol (disambiguation)
- Caroll
- Caryl
