= East Carroll =

East Carroll may refer to:

- East Carroll Parish, Louisiana
- East Carroll Township, Cambria County, Pennsylvania

== See also ==
- Carol (disambiguation)
