= Caryl =

Caryl is both a unisex given name and surname. As a given name, it is an alternate form of Carol that is common for women and Carroll that is uncommon for men. It is also an uncommon surname.

== Given name ==
- Caryl Bagot, 6th Baron Bagot (1877–1961), Irish Guards officer
- Caryl Brahms (1901–1982), pseudonym of English writer Doris Caroline Abrahams (1901–1982)
- Caryl Chessman (1921–1960), convicted robber and rapist
- Caryl Churchill (born 1938), English playwright
- Caryl Parry Jones (born 1958), Welsh singer
- Caryl Kristensen (born 1960), American comedian, sitcom actor and daytime talk show host
- Caryl Parker Haskins (1908–2001), American scientist, author, inventor and philanthropist
- Caryl Phillips (born 1958), Kittitian-British writer
- Caryl Righetti (born 1984), Swiss footballer
- Caryl Thomas (born 1986), Welsh rugby union player
- Caryl Rae Weston (1941–2014), New Zealand professor of banking and management

== Surname ==
- Joseph Caryl (1602–1673), English theologian
- Ronnie Caryl (born 1953), English guitarist

== See also ==
- Caral
- Carel
- Carell
- Caril
- Carol (disambiguation)
- Caroll
- Caryll
