= Annalen =

Annalen may refer to:

- Annalen der Physik, a physics journal
- Crell's Annalen, a chemistry journal
- Liebigs Annalen, a chemistry journal
- Mathematische Annalen, mathematical journal
