= IGAFA =

Instituto Galego de Formación en Acuicultura (IGAFA)
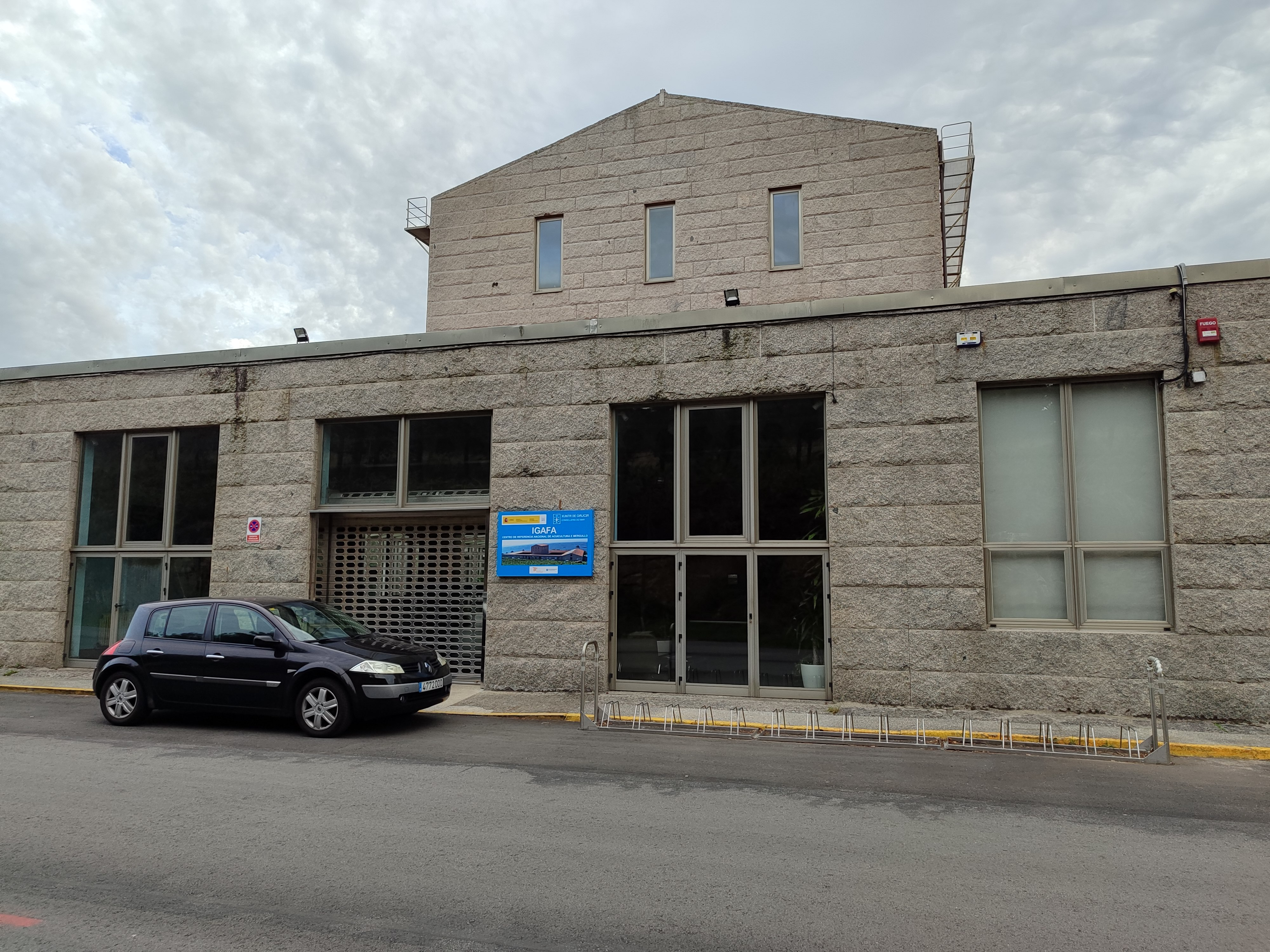
- Facade of the IGAFA center building

Location
- Lugar Ninho de Corvo s/n Illa de Arousa, Galicia; 36626; Galicia
- Coordinates: 42.5609°N 8.8855°W

Information
- School type: State Professional training center
- Status: Active
- Classes offered: Technician courses in aquaculture and maritime activities
- Language: Galician; Spanish

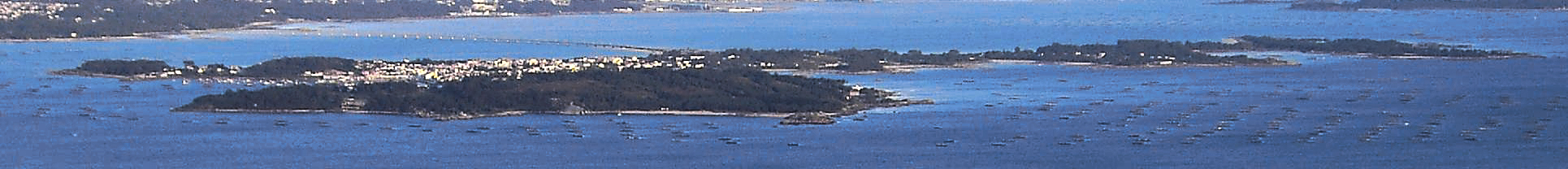
IGaFA is located in NW part of the island

The Galician Institute of Aquaculture Training ( IGaFA or IGAFA ) is an educational body dependent on the Dirección Xeral de Innovación e Desenvolvemento (Directorate General of Innovation and Development) of the Consellería de Pesca e Asuntos Marítimos (Ministry of Fisheries and Maritime Affairs) of the Galician autonomous government (Xunta de Galicia). It is co-financed by the European Social Fund. Courses are taught for obtaining the certificates of shell fisherman, aquaculturist and specialists in marine cultures.

The center is located in the municipality of Arousa Island (Illa de Arousa).

== History ==
The first attempts to find a "Pisciculture" center in the Ría de Arousa were due to Antón Vila Nadal, when he proposed the creation of a single Galician Biological Station, located in Carril at the end of the 19th century. In the pamphlet Objeto y descripción del Acuario Ambulante de la Estación Zoológica de Barcelona y Escuela de Piscicultura de Arosa (1892) he explained the details and set out his ideas about the Station. In 1900 the first stone of the Station was laid in Carril. Under the auspices of the reform of the Museum of Natural Sciences, the establishment was intended to be created, dependent on the University of Santiago de Compostela and in charge of the professor of Natural History. However, it was not until 1952 that the Marine Research Institute was created in Vigo.

Much later, public bodies such as the Center for the Control of the Marine Environment (CCMM), CIMA and INTECMAR were created.

In the second half of the 80s, during the presidency of the Xunta de González Laxe, the IGAFA was tendered, the main architect was Pascuala Campos de Michelena, and others collaborated such as Rodríguez Abilleira and Teresa Táboas. Formally, they sought continuity with the large number of canneries on the island, and the Museo do Mar de Galicia, designed in Vigo by César Portela, bears similarities to the IGAFA building. It was inaugurated in 1992, under the presidency of Fraga Iribarne.

Since 2005, IGaFA has been the "National Center for Occupational Vocational Training in the Aquaculture Training Area" and has been ISO 9001: 2000 certified by the Quality Management System.

== Training offers ==
Occupational training courses in aquaculture were initially held at the center until 1994.

It is possible to study diving and aquaculture courses at the center.

It is part of the Erasmus + organization.

The offer of non-regulated courses includes those of shellfishing and professional diving, since 1999, being the only center in Galicia that provides this training.

=== Specific Vocational Training Cycles ===
The offers of regulated training courses since 1994 is the Specific Vocational Training Cycles :

- Aquaculture Cultivation Operations Technician (Intermediate)
- Higher Technician in Aquaculture Production (Higher Degree)
- In the year 2000, the teaching of the intermediate cycle of adult aquaculture (or Modular) and the Social Guarantee Program "Aquaculture Worker" began.
- In 2001, the middle cycle "Medium Depth Diving Technician" was implemented.
- In the 2003–2004 academic year, the "Master in Innovation, Production Technology and Aquaculture Management" (MITGA) was taught.
- Technician in underwater and hyperbaric operations.

== Facilities ==
The center has common facilities for teaching aquaculture and diving, with 11 classrooms for theoretical classes, a library, an auditorium, science and biology laboratories, an audiovisual classroom and a computer room.

For the specific education of aquaculture it has cultivation facilities of 1,175 m ^{2} with the necessary sections for the conditioning of the breeders, incubation, larval culture, larval feeding ( phytoplankton and zooplankton ) and pre-fattening of cultivated species, in the areas of auxiliary crops, cultivation of fish, shellfish farming and shellfish farming.

In addition, it has four laboratories equipped with optical material for the practices of aquaculture cycles, as well as a workshop on marine culture facilities.

It also has a raft for the cultivation of molluscs, two cages for fattening fish and crustaceans and an intertidal park provided by the Fishermen's Guild of A Illa de Arousa.

In the outer enclosure are located two mini-farms of molluscs, a greenhouse for continental fish farming and facilities of the "Plan of Repopulation of Marine Species of the Galician Coast ".

For professional diving lessons, there are equipped rooms, an indoor swimming pool, an outdoor pool, a hyperbaric chamber, a gas charging station, an aquarium room, a welding workshop, a mechanics workshop and several boats.

== See also ==
- Aquaculture

=== External links ===
- Reference page on the Xunta server
- IGaFa Youtube Channel
- YouTube video with facilities and training offer
- Video of the Open Day (November 2021)
- The center in the TVE program "Aquí hay trabajo" (in Spanish)
