= Carola (disambiguation) =

Carola is a female given name, the Latinized form of the Germanic given names Caroline or Carol.

Carola may also refer to:

== Family name ==
- Josep Pallach i Carolà (1920–1977), a Catalan socialist leader
- Marco Carola (born 1975), an Italian electronic musician and DJ

== Places ==
- Carola, Missouri, an unincorporated community in the United States

== Ships ==
- Carola-class corvette, a group of six 19th century German warships
  - SMS Carola, the lead ship of the class, launched in 1880
- USS Carola IV (SP-812), a US Navy auxiliary patrol boat, built 1885
- SY Carola, a steam yacht built in 1898, now a floating museum ship at Irvine, Scotland
- Carola (yacht 1930), a motor yacht, currently named Talitha

== Other uses ==
- Carola (sea vegetable), several species of edible seaweed
- Coca Carola, a Swedish punk band
