= Carrell =

Carrell is a surname. Notable people with the surname include:

- Al Carrell, columnist, author, radio personality, and home construction/improvement expert
- Alexis Carrel a.k.a. Carrell (1873–1944), French surgeon, biologist and eugenicist
- C. L. Carrell (1875–1933), American entertainment promoter and radio station operator
- Duane Carrell, American football player
- George Aloysius Carrell (1803–1868), rector at Xavier University in Cincinnati, Ohio, and first Roman Catholic Bishop of Covington, Kentucky
- James P. Carrell (1787–1854), minister, singing teacher, composer and songbook compiler
- John Carrell (figure skater), American ice dancer
- Jordan Carrell (born 1994), American football player
- Mike Carrell (1944–2013), American politician and educator
- Monroe J. Carell Jr. (1932–2008), American businessman and philanthropist
- Peter Carrell (born 1959), New Zealand Anglican bishop
- Rudi Carrell (1934–2006), Dutch entertainer
- Suzanne Carrell, founder of the Congrès de la Culture Francaise en Floride

== See also ==
- Carel
- Carrel
- Carell
- Carroll (given name)
- McCarrell
