= Prince Charles Iworah =

American football player (born 1993)

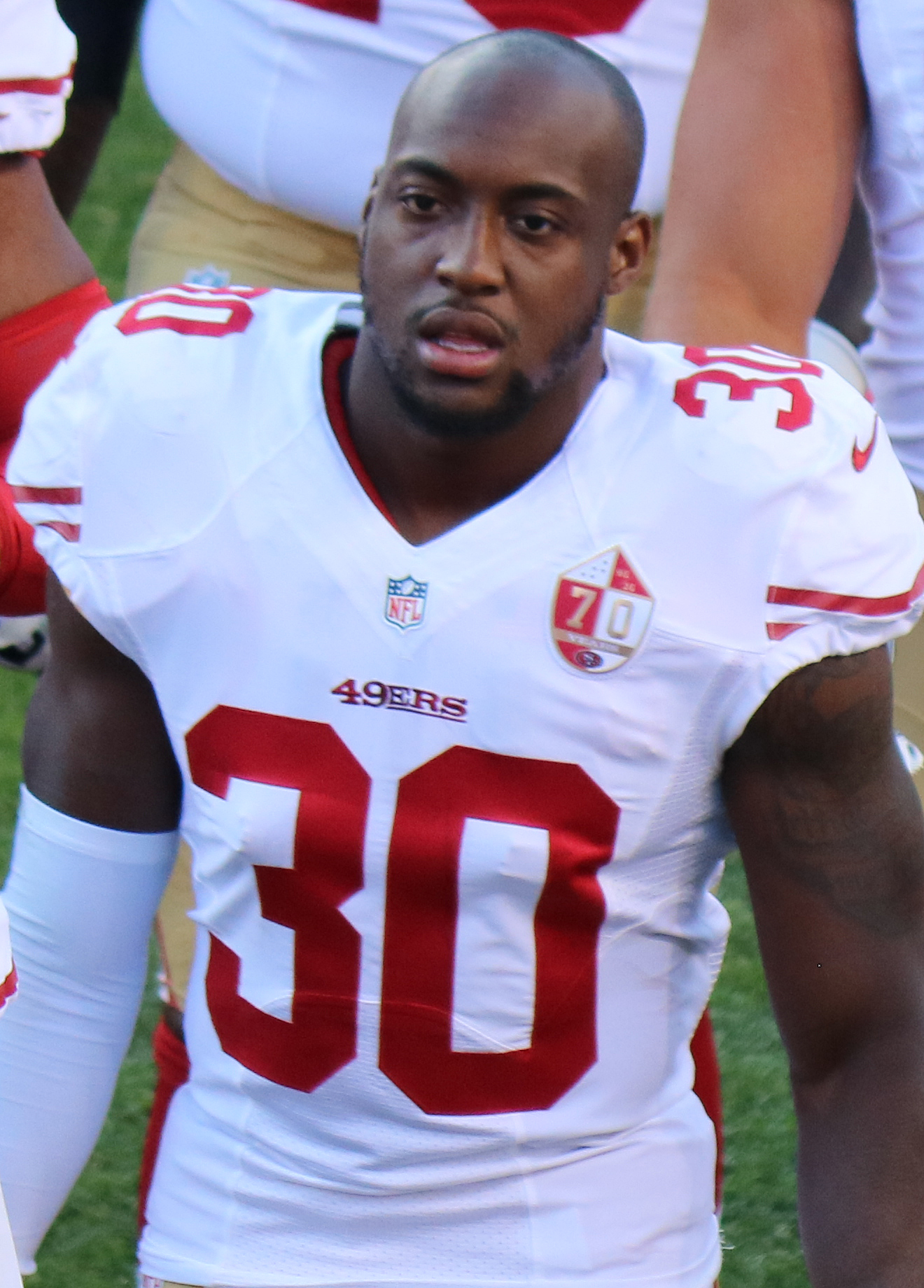
- Iworah with the San Francisco 49ers in 2016

No. 30, 23
- Position: Cornerback

Personal information
- Born: March 11, 1993 (age 33); Nashville, Tennessee, U.S.
- Listed height: 5 ft 11 in (1.80 m)
- Listed weight: 193 lb (88 kg)

Career information
- High school: Father Ryan (Nashville)
- College: Western Kentucky
- NFL draft: 2016: 7th round, 249th overall pick

Career history
- San Francisco 49ers (2016–2017); Kansas City Chiefs (2018)*; Washington Redskins (2018)*; Atlanta Falcons (2018)*; Team 9 (2020); Montreal Alouettes (2021)*; TSL Conquerors (2021); Pittsburgh Maulers (2022); St. Louis Battlehawks (2024)*
- * Offseason or practice squad member only

Career NFL statistics
- Total tackles: 1
- Stats at Pro Football Reference

Prince Charles Iworah (born March 11, 1993) is an American former professional football player who was a cornerback for the San Francisco 49ers of the National Football League (NFL). He played college football for the Western Kentucky Hilltoppers, and was selected by the 49ers in the seventh round of the 2016 NFL draft.

== Early life ==
Iworah attended Father Ryan High School where he was an All-State selection as running back during his senior season in 2010. For that season, he rushed 182 times for 1,096 yards and 11 touchdowns.

== College career ==
Iworah attended Western Kentucky University, where he joined the Hilltoppers during the season and converted to cornerback. As a redshirt freshman in 2012, he appeared in just one game, during which he recorded his first two career tackles. As a redshirt sophomore in 2013, he appeared in 10 games. He recorded 10 tackles while playing primarily as a back-up defensive back and on special teams. As a redshirt junior in 2014, he started all 13 games at cornerback. He recorded 37 tackles, 2.5 tackles-for-loss, one interception and one forced fumble. As a redshirt senior in 2015, he appeared in 13 games. He recorded 42 tackles, one tackle-for-loss, 11 passes defended, and four interceptions.

== Professional career ==
Pre-draft measurables
Height	Weight	40-yard dash	10-yard split	20-yard split	20-yard shuttle	Three-cone drill	Vertical jump	Broad jump	Bench press
5 ft 11 in (1.80 m)	192 lb (87 kg)	4.34 s	1.54 s	2.52 s	4.52 s	7.12 s	40 in (1.02 m)	10 ft 8 in (3.25 m)	25 reps
All values are from Western Kentucky Pro Day.

=== San Francisco 49ers ===
Iworah was selected by the San Francisco 49ers in the seventh round (249th overall) of the 2016 NFL draft. On September 3, 2016, he was released by the 49ers as part of final roster cuts and was signed to the practice squad the next day. On December 20, 2016, he was promoted to the active roster.

On September 1, 2017, Iworah was waived/injured by the 49ers and placed on injured reserve. He was released on December 23, 2017.

=== Kansas City Chiefs ===
On January 4, 2018, Iworah signed a reserve/future contract with the Kansas City Chiefs, but was waived on May 8, 2018.

=== Washington Redskins ===
Iworah signed with the Washington Redskins on July 25, 2018. On September 1, 2018, he was waived for final roster cuts before the start of the 2018 season.

=== Atlanta Falcons ===
On September 13, 2018, Iworah was signed to the Atlanta Falcons' practice squad. He was released on September 19, 2018.

=== 2020–2021 ===
After spending time on the XFL's Team 9 practice squad in 2020, Iworah signed with the Montreal Alouettes of the Canadian Football League on April 7, 2021. He was placed on the suspended list on May 20, 2021, in order to play with the Conquerors of The Spring League in May 2021.

=== Pittsburgh Maulers ===
On May 19, 2022, Iworah signed with the Pittsburgh Maulers of the United States Football League. He was released on February 11, 2023.

=== St. Louis Battlehawks ===
On August 9, 2023, following the XFL Combine, Iworah's league rights were acquired by the XFL's St. Louis Battlehawks. He was signed on December 14, 2023. He was released on March 10, 2024.
