= Del Carril =

Del Carril is a surname. Notable people with the name include:

- Bonifacio del Carril (1911–1994), Argentine writer and politician
- Hugo del Carril (1912–1989), Argentine film actor, film director and tango singer
- Jorge del Carril (1904-?), Argentine bobsledder.
- Justo del Carril (1923–2008), Argentine alpine skier and bobsledder
- Salvador María del Carril (1798–1883), Argentine politician

== See also ==
- Carril, surname
