= A Illa de Arousa =

- Municipality
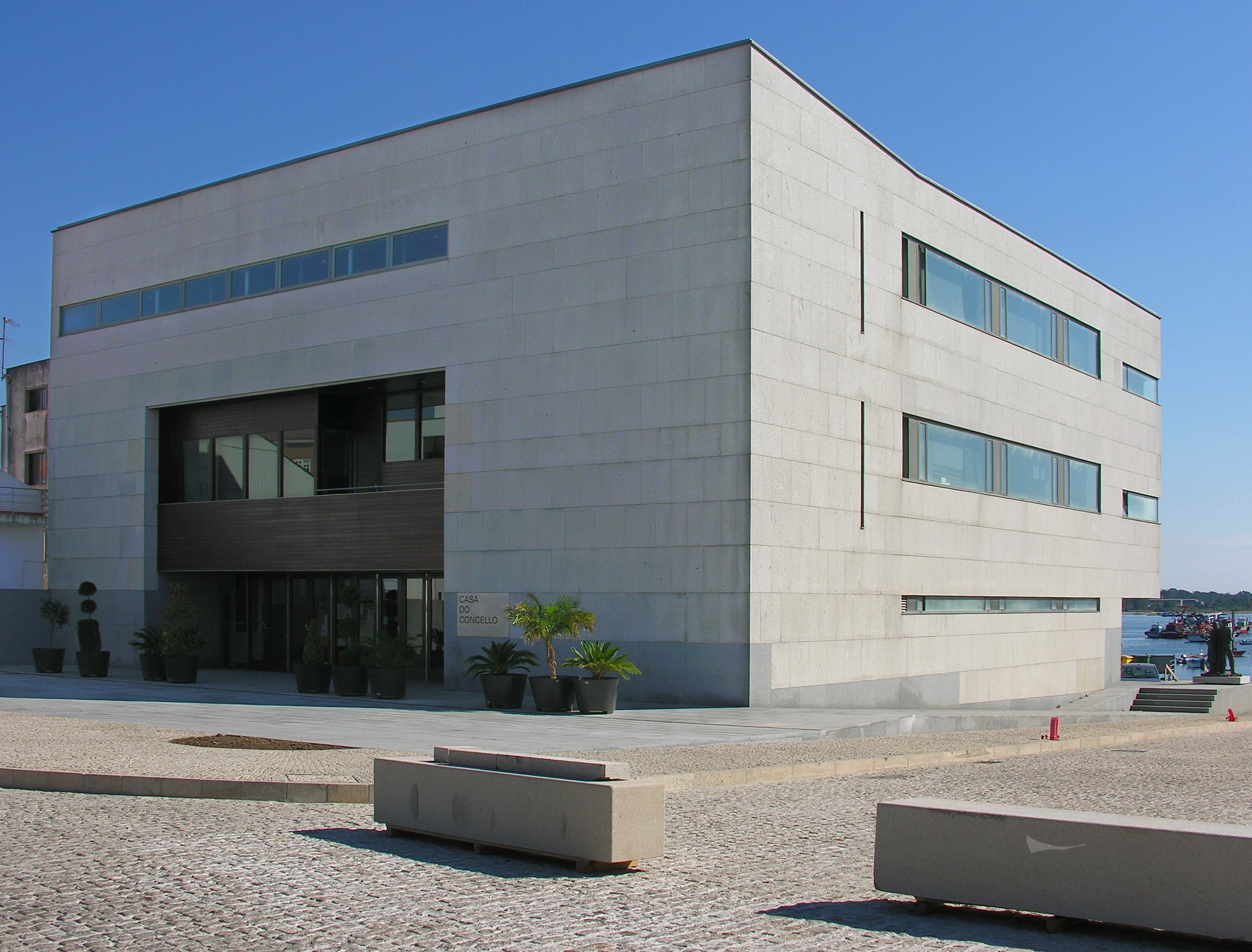
- Town Hall

- Flag Coat of arms

- Location in Spain
- Coordinates: 42°33′16″N 8°51′50″W
- Country: Spain
- Autonomous community: Galicia
- Province: Pontevedra
- Comarca: Salnés

Government
  - Alcalde: Luis Arosa García (PSdeG-PSOE; government alliance with BNG)

Area
  - Total: 7 km^{2} (2.7 sq mi)
- Elevation: 9 m (30 ft)

Population (2025)
  - Total: 4,813
  - Density: 690/km^{2} (1,800/sq mi)
- Demonym(s): Arousán, á
- Time zone: UTC+1 (CET)
  - Summer (DST): UTC+2 (CEST)
- Postal code: 36626
- Website: https://www.ailladearousa.es/

A Illa de Arousa (Galician: [ɐ ˈiʎɐ ð(e) aˈɾowsɐ]; unofficial Spanish: Isla de Arosa) is the only island municipality in Galicia, Spain in the province of Pontevedra. It is located in the heart of the Ria de Arousa. According to 2021 INE the island's population was 4,951 inhabitants. The population is divided into several neighborhoods, and places of interest are the lighthouse's environment, the island of Areoso (close to the Illa de Arousa) and Carreirón Natural Park, which is listed as a special protection zone for heron populations among other birds that inhabit the island. The Holy viewpoint is the highest point on the island. "San Xulián da Illa de Arousa" is the only parish in this island. Some of its beaches are A Area da Secada, A Lavanqueira, O Vao, Camaxe, Carreirón, Espiñeiro and O Cabodeiro.

A Illa de Arousa has five ports. Xufre is the most important and the other important docks include O Campo, Chazo and Cabodeiro.

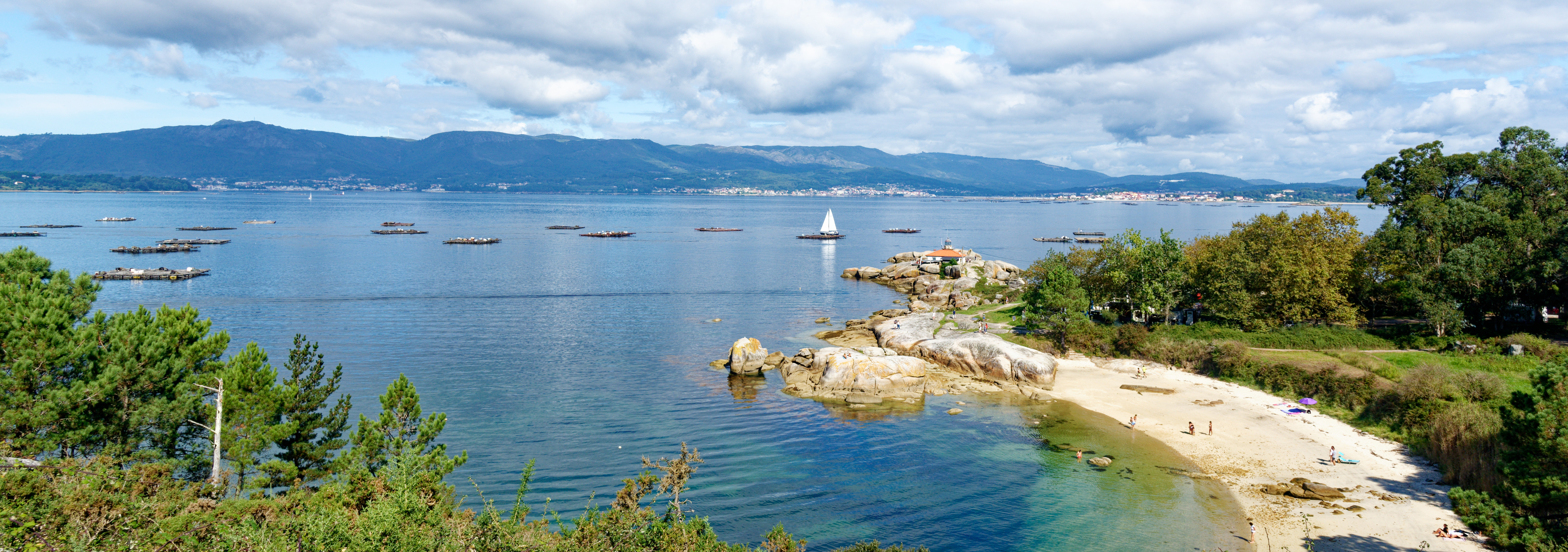
Faro Punta Caballo. Structures in the water are for shellfish farming.

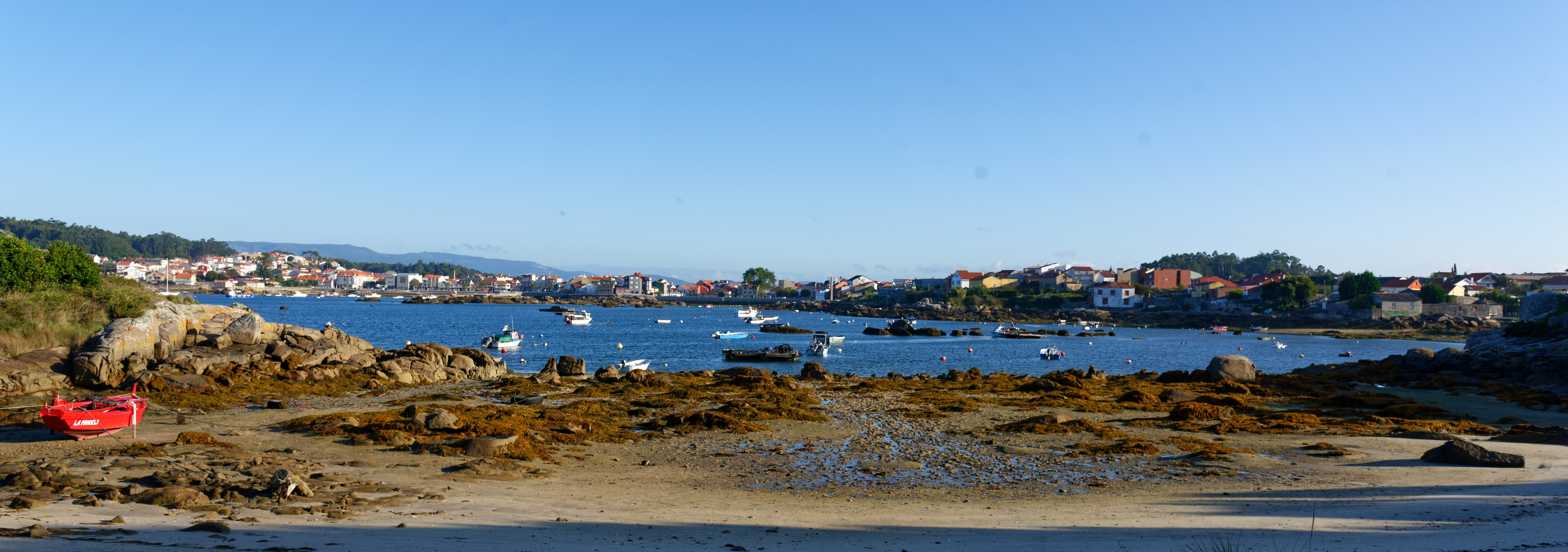
Praia Comboa

== Etymology ==
According to E. Bascuas, "Arousa", registered as insulam Arauza in 899, would belong to the old European hydronymy, and is derived from the Indo-European root *er- 'flow, move'.

== See also ==
- List of municipalities in Pontevedra
- List of islands of Spain
- IGAFA
