= Leonard Dobbin (chemist) =

British chemist and author (1858–1952)

Dr Leonard Dobbin FRSE (30 July 1858 – 3 March 1952) was a chemist and author on the history of chemistry and several chemistry textbooks. He was known as a modest and lovable man.

== Life ==
He was born in Belfast on 30 July 1858. He studied at Queen's College, Belfast and then the College of Science in London before undertaking postgraduate study at Würzburg in central Germany where he gained his doctorate (PhD). He then went to the University of Edinburgh to work as Professor Alexander Crum Brown's assistant. In 1894 he became a lecturer, and in 1924 he was promoted to Reader.

In 1881 he was elected a Fellow of the Royal Society of Edinburgh. His proposers were Alexander Crum Brown, Peter Guthrie Tait, Robert Milner Robertson, and Sir William Turner. With over 70 years as a Fellow he was one of the longest-serving Fellows of all time. He served as vice-president to the Society 1939 to 1942, standing down at the age of 83. He was also Secretary to The Alembic Club.

He translated Albert Ladenburg's Lectures on the Development of the History of Chemistry since the time of Lavoisier into English in 1900.

In later life he lived at 6 Wilton Road in south Edinburgh, close to the university's science facilities at Kings Buildings.

He died in Edinburgh on 3 March 1952, aged 93.

== Publications ==
- Lectures on the Development of the History of Chemistry since the time of Lavoisier (1900)
- Salts and their Reactions (1904)
- Medico-Physical Works (1907) with Crum Brown
- The collected Papers of Carl Wilhelm Scheele (1931)
- A Cullen Chemical Manuscript of 1753 (1936)
- The History of the Discovery of Phosgene (1945)
