= Carol =

Carol may refer to:

== People with the name ==
- Carol (given name)
- Avedon Carol (born 1951), British writer and feminist
- Henri Carol (1910–1984), French composer and organist
- Martine Carol (1920–1967), French film actress
- Sue Carol (1906–1982), American actress and talent agent, wife of actor Alan Ladd

== Arts, entertainment, and media ==
=== Music ===
- Carol (music), a festive or religious song; historically also a dance
  - Christmas carol, a song sung during Christmas
- Carol (Carol Banawa album) (1997)
- Carol (Chara album) (2009)
- "Carol" (Chuck Berry song), a rock 'n roll song written and recorded by Chuck Berry in 1958
- Carol, a Japanese rock band that Eikichi Yazawa once belonged to
- "The Carol", a song by Loona from HaSeul
- "Carol", a song by Slint from Tweez

=== Other uses in arts, entertainment, and media ===
- Carol (anime), an anime OVA featuring character designs by Yun Kouga
- Carol, the title of a 1952 novel by Patricia Highsmith, better known as The Price of Salt
- Carol (film), a 2015 British-American film starring Cate Blanchett and Rooney Mara, based on the Patricia Highsmith novel
  - Carol (soundtrack), soundtrack of the 2015 film
- "Carol", a 2018 episode of Mike Tyson Mysteries
- "Carol" (Not Going Out), a 2021 television episode

== Places ==
- Carol, a crater on the Moon near Ibn Firnas
- Carol City, Florida, a former census-designated place
- Carol Park, a public park in Bucharest, Romania

== Other uses ==
- Mazda Carol, a kei car automobile
- Tropical Storm Carol, a list of tropical cyclones named Carol
- Monthly Carol, a Japanese manga magazine published by Kodansha

== See also ==
- Carole (disambiguation)
- Carrel
- Carrol
- Carroll (disambiguation)
- Carrols (disambiguation)
- Oh Carol (disambiguation)
- King Carol (disambiguation)
- Karol (disambiguation)
