= Father Ryan High School =

Catholic school in Nashville, Tennessee, US

Location
- 700 Norwood Drive; Nashville, Tennessee 37204; United States; 36°5′53″N 86°46′1″W

Information
- Type: Private
- Motto: A Tradition of Faith, Knowledge, Service.
- Religious affiliation: Catholic Church
- Established: 1925
- Oversight: Diocese of Nashville
- Principal: Francisco Espinosa
- Teaching staff: 89.8 (on a FTE basis)
- Grades: 9–12
- Gender: Coeducational
- Enrollment: 863 (2021–22)
- Student to teacher ratio: 19.6
- Colors: Purple, red, and white
- Nickname: Irish
- Accreditation: Southern Association of Colleges and Schools
- Newspaper: The Moina
- Yearbook: Irish Pride
- Website: www.fatherryan.org

Father Ryan High School is a private Catholic high school in Nashville, Tennessee. Founded in 1925 as Nashville Catholic High School for Boys, Father Ryan is located in the Diocese of Nashville. It was the first racially integrated high school in Tennessee.

== History ==
The school was founded 1925 by Alphonse John Smith, the bishop of Diocese of Nashville. It was initially named Nashville Catholic High School for Boys before adopting its current name in 1927 to honor Father Abram Joseph Ryan.

In 1944, students at Father Ryan in conjunction with other schools in Nashville raised nearly $600,000 to purchase a Boeing B-17 Flying Fortress to be named "The Spirit of Father Ryan" during World War II.

In September 1954, the school began admitting black students, making it the first racially integrated school in Tennessee.

On January 4, 1965, Father Ryan competed against Pearl High School in basketball at Municipal Auditorium. This was the first racially integrated athletic contest in Nashville history.

In 1970, the school merged with the Cathedral High School and became coeducational.

== Campus ==
Father Ryan High School's first campus was at 2300 Elliston Place, which was dedicated in 1929. Father Ryan remained there for 62 years and expanded twice, but eventually it outgrew these facilities and during the summer of 1991 relocated to its present home on Norwood Drive in the Oak Hill area of Nashville, TN.

This 40-acre (160,000 m^{2}) site includes an academic building containing computer labs, science labs, and classrooms. There is also the administrative Cloister Building which houses art rooms, band room, dining hall, and the St. James Chapel. The field house contains three full size basketball courts, a wrestling room, workout areas, locker rooms, and coaching offices. The site also has softball, baseball, soccer, football fields and a track. Other additions include a freestanding library, a football stadium, and the Center for the Arts. The most recent addition is a STEAM Lab in the library.

Many remnants of the Elliston Place campus are placed around campus. These include the oak doors, previously the entrance to the old campus, which are now part of the Neuhoff Library. Many bricks inside the Academic Building are from the Elliston Place campus and are labeled as such.

== Demographics ==
The demographic breakdown of the 863 students enrolled in 2021–2022 was:

- Native American/Alaskan - 0.2%
- Asian - 3.2%
- Black - 5.3%
- Hispanic - 5.3%
- White - 82.6%
- Hawaiian/Pacific Islander - 0.6%
- Multiracial - 2.7%

== Arts ==
Father Ryan High School has 31 visual and performing arts programs. These programs include the band, choir, theatre, and other visual and performing arts. Students' art projects are featured in the Gadfly student art magazine at the end of the school year.

Band The Father Ryan Band was founded in 1947. The band has its marching season in the fall, performing at home football games during half-time. In 2012, the band was invited to participate in the Macy's Day Thanksgiving Day Parade. The band is one of Father Ryan's most successful groups. Through the competitive winter season, the band has won numerous state and world champion titles.

Theatre The Purple Masque Players was founded in 1927. The group puts on a play and a musical each year. Students can take theatre as a class and/or participate in the Purple Masque Players club.

== Athletics ==
Father Ryan is a member of the Tennessee Secondary School Athletic Association and Division II Class AAA E/M Region. The Father Ryan athletic program includes football, basketball, soccer, golf, baseball, track, cross country, volleyball, golf, swimming & diving, tennis, softball, wrestling, lacrosse, ice hockey, bowling, cheerleading and rugby.

== House system ==
In 2019, Father Ryan announced plans to create a house system in the style of other catholic schools, which they began in 2020. There are six houses on campus: Elliston, Emerald, Immaculata, Norwood, Oak, and Trinity. Each of these houses has a color, saint, Catholic social teaching, and reason behind its name. These houses compete for a "house cup" which is awarded at the end of the school year.

Elliston House is named after the first campus of Father Ryan located on Elliston Place. The house color is grey and their saint is St. Maximilian Kolbe. Their social teaching is Call to Family, Community, and Participation.

Emerald House is named after the first yearbook at Father Ryan. The house color is green and their saint is St. Kateri Tekakwitha. Their social teaching is Care for God's Creation.

Immaculata House is named after the Immaculate Conception of Mary. The house color is dark blue and their saint is St. Katherine Drexel. Their social teaching is Life and Dignity of the Human Person.

Norwood House is named after the current Father Ryan campus on Norwood Drive. Their house color is teal and their saint is Bl. Pier Frassati. Their social teaching is Rights and Responsibilities.

Oak House is named after the oak doors on the Neuhoff Library (see section Campus above for more information). Their color is chartreuse and their saint is St. Teresa of Calcutta. Their social teaching is Options for the Poor and Vulnerable.

Trinity House is named after the Holy Trinity of the Catholic Church. Their color is orange and their saint is St. Oscar Romero. Their social teaching is Dignity of Workers and Worker's Rights.

== Notable alumni ==
- Charlie Becker, American football player
- Monroe J. Carell, Jr., President & CEO, Central Parking System, Inc.
- David Choby, 11th bishop of the Diocese of Nashville
- Lou Graham, professional golfer
- Thomas Aquinas Higgins, judge
- Chip Saltsman, Former Tennessee Republican Party chairman
- John Lawrence Seigenthaler, journalist
- John Seigenthaler, Jr., journalist
- James F. "Boots" Donnelly, American football player and coach
- Prince Charles Iworah, American football player
- Joejuan Williams, American football player
- Michael Knox, Record Producer / President Peermusic Nashville / CEO Music Knox
