= Carrel =

Carrel is a surname. Notable people with the surname include:

- Armand Carrel (1800–1836), French writer
- Alexis Carrel (1873–1944), French surgeon and biologist
- Dany Carrel (born 1932), French actress
- Félicité Carrel, Italian mountaineer
- Frank Carrel (1870–1940), Canadian journalist, publisher and politician
- Gabriella Carrel (born 1966), Italian cross-country skier
- Jean-Antoine Carrel (1829–1890), Italian mountain climber
- Luigi Carrel (1901–1983), Italian mountain climber

== See also ==
- Carrel (crater), lunar crater named after Alexis Carrel
- Carrel desk, small high-sided desk
- Carel
- Carell
- Carril, surname
- Carrell
