= SY Carola =

Steam yacht from 1898

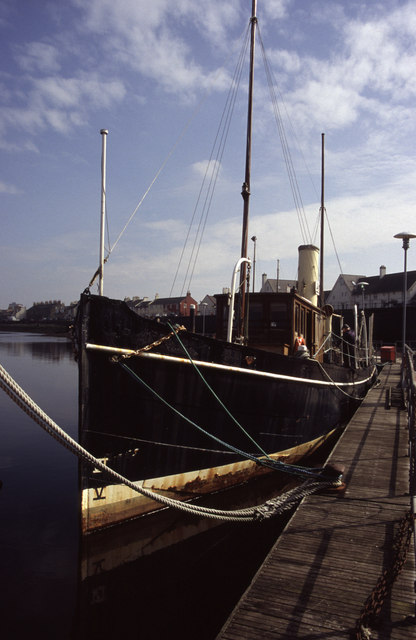
- Carola at the Scottish Maritime Museum

History

- Name: Carola
- Builder: Scott & Sons Shipbuilding & Engineering Co.
- Launched: 1898
- Status: Museum ship

General characteristics
- Type: Steam yacht
- Length: 70.16 ft (21.38 m)
- Beam: 13.11 ft (4.00 m)
- Depth: 7.38 ft (2.25 m)

SY Carola is a steam yacht built in 1898. She is possibly the oldest seagoing yacht in the world despite being no longer operable and used as a museum exhibit in Irvine, Scotland.

== History ==
Built at Scott & Sons Shipbuilding & Engineering Co. at Bowling, on the Clyde, Carola was built for personal use of the Scott family, up until 1959 when the family sold her to a private owner. In 1964, she sold to another private owner, before being purchased in 1981 by a Sussex firm and used for corporate hospitality. She was sold to Plysosene of Southwater, Sussex, and extensively refitted for use as a promotional and corporate hospitality vessel. in 1994, she was then taken to the Scottish Maritime Museum to be a museum exhibit where she has resided ever since. In 2020, according to The Herald, a 3D model of the Carola is available on the Sketchfab marketplace and can be viewed on the museum's official website.
