= Carole Hill =

Anthropologist

Carole E. Hill is an American anthropologist and educator. She is a professor emerita at Georgia Southern University in Statesboro, Georgia. She chaired the anthropology department at Georgia State University in Atlanta.

The University of West Georgia Foundation established a $100,000 endowment to support the study of anthropology and named it in her honor. In 2014 she was interviewed for an oral history project and the interview is part of the University of Kentucky Libraries holdings. She served as president of the Southern Anthropological Society.

== Writings ==
- Current Health Policy Issues and Alternatives: An Applied Social Science Perspective (Southern Anthropological Society Proceedings) University of Georgia Press (1986)
- Cultural Diversity in the U.S. South: Anthropological Contributions to a Region in Transition, a collection of essays edited by Carole E. Hill and Patricia D. Beaver. University of Georgia Press (Southern Anthropological Society Proceedings, No. 31), Athens, 1998.
- Community Health Systems in the Rural American South: Linking People and Policy
- Training Manual in Medical Anthropology
