= Plumbago (disambiguation) =

Plumbago may refer to:

== Genera ==
- Plumbago, the leadworts, a genus of flowering plants
- Plumbago (butterfly), a genus of skipper butterflies

== Materials ==
- Used generically for lead ores such as galena and lead oxides such as red lead
- Plumbago (mineral), an archaic word for the mineral form of graphite
- Plumbago drawing, graphite portraits of the seventeenth and eighteenth centuries
