= Carole Easton =

Carole Easton OBE is chief executive of Young Women's Trust (previously Platform 51), a charity supporting and representing disadvantaged young women. She is a previous Chair of Young Minds, a charity committed to improving the emotional well-being and mental health of children and young people, and Chief Executive at Young Women’s Trust, a charity supporting and representing young women at risk of lifelong financial and emotional insecurity. Easton is also Trustee at Depaul UK, the youth homelessness charity.

== Career ==
Easton began her career as a child and family psychotherapist in the England's National Health Service. Since then, she has worked in the voluntary sector.

Before joining Young Women's Trust, she worked permanently in the public and voluntary sector and, in 2009, undertook a twelve-month assignment at disability advocacy charity SpeakingUp, where she oversaw the merger of the services with Advocacy Partners, and prior to that she was Chief Executive at CLIC Sargent, ChildLine and Cruse Bereavement Care.

Clic Sargent was officially formed in April 2005 when Clic and Sargent Cancer Care for Children merged. Easton took over soon afterwards tasked with integrating the two charities and reducing their overheads.

As Chief Executive of ChildLine, she persuaded the National Society for the Prevention of Cruelty to Children to absorb ChildLine into the larger charity in 2005.

Easton, who was appointed executive director of Cruse Bereavement Care in March 1998 following a realignment and expansion.

Easton was chair of YoungMinds (from 2012 to 2017) and previously a trustee of Missing People (since 2008) and Child Welfare Scheme (CWS) (since 2008) which funds and builds expertise for local health and education services for vulnerable children in Nepal.

Easton was appointed Officer of the Order of the British Empire (OBE) in the 2017 New Year Honours for services to young people.
