= USS Carola IV =

Patrol vessel of the United States Navy

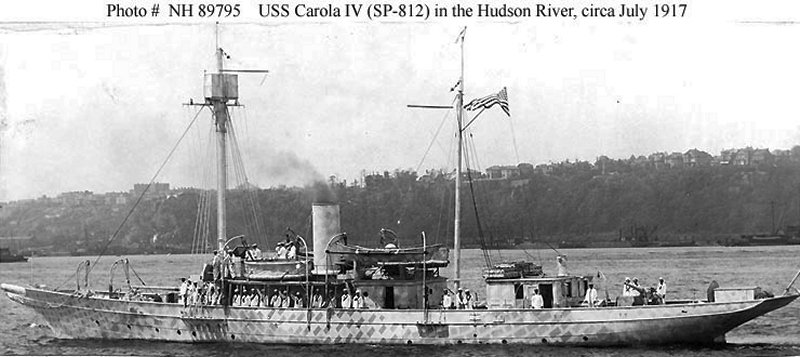
- USS Carola IV off New York, 1917

History

United States
- Name: USS Carola IV
- Builder: Culzean Shipbuilding & Engineering Co, Maidens
- Launched: 1885
- Acquired: June 1917
- Commissioned: July 1917
- Decommissioned: December 1919
- Fate: Sold

General characteristics
- Tonnage: 240 GRT, 145 NRT
- Length: 144.05 ft (43.91 m)
- Beam: 23.15 ft (7.06 m)
- Depth: 13.15 ft (4.01 m)
- Installed power: 110 NHP
- Propulsion: 1 × compound engine; 1 × screw
- Speed: 10 kn (19 km/h)
- Complement: 68
- Armament: 2 x 3-inch (76 mm) guns

USS Carola IV, was a patrol ship of the United States Navy, built in 1885 by Culzean Shipbuilding & Engineering Company, Maidens, South Ayrshire, Scotland, as the steam yacht Black Pearl. She was built for the Earl of Pembroke & Montgomery. In 1895 the yacht was sold to E B Sheldon of Chicago, Illinois, USA. and in 1900 she was purchased by Evans R Dick of Philadelphia, Pennsylvania and renamed Elsa. She was later briefly named Haida and Columbine, but by mid-1910 was owned by Leonard Richards of New York City, Commodore of the Larchmont Yacht Club.

In June 1917, she was purchased by the US Navy for World War I service. Commissioned in early July, she crossed the Atlantic to Brest, France, during that month and the next, voyaging by way of Dominion of Newfoundland and the Azores. After a brief patrol operation along the French coast, in October 1917 Carola IV was condemned as unseaworthy and reduced to harbor service as an accommodation vessel. She was employed in that capacity through the end of the Great War and for a year beyond. Carola IV was decommissioned in late December 1919. The vessel was sold to a local Brest buyer.

The ship was broken up in 1957.
