= Carel van Schaik =

Dutch primatologist

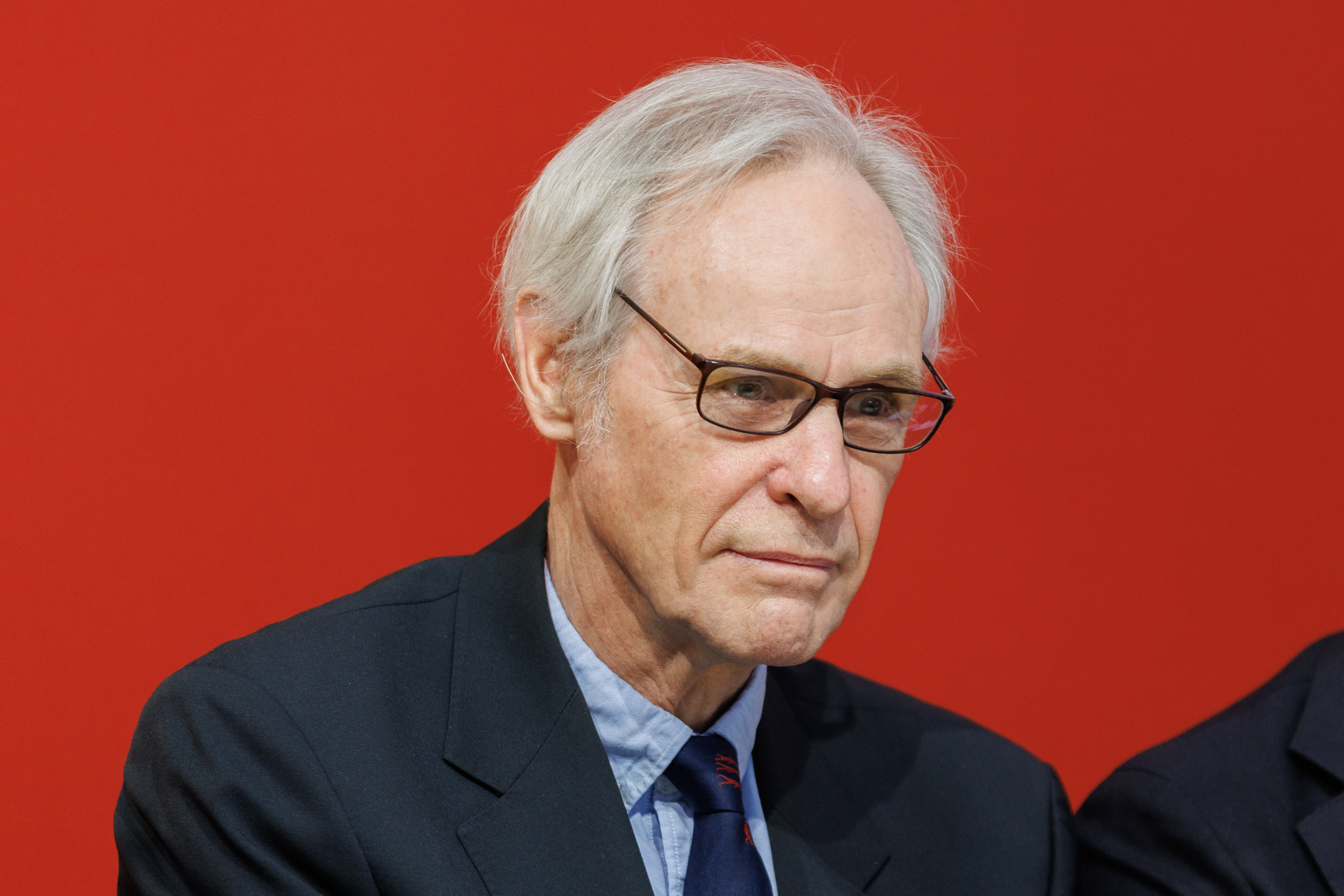
van Schaik in 2025

Carolus Philippus "Carel" van Schaik (born 15 June 1953, Rotterdam) is a Dutch primatologist who since 2004 is professor and director of the Anthropological Institute and Museum at the University of Zürich, Switzerland.

Van Schaik studied biology at the University of Utrecht, graduating in 1979. He was a researcher for the Netherlands Foundation for the Advancement of Tropical Research until 1984 and finished his doctoral dissertation for the Utrecht University in 1985. After positions at this university and at Princeton University, he became associate professor at the Department of Biological Anthropology and Anatomy at Duke University in Durham in 1989. In 2004 he moved to the University of Zurich. In 2007 Van Schaik became a correspondent of the Royal Netherlands Academy of Arts and Sciences.

The interest for the monkeys was born toward the seventies, during an expedition to Sumatra beside his wife. Soon after, van Schaik become always more interested to the monkeys that to the plants, and when in the north-western part of Sumatra he comes upon in the marshy region of the Suaq, he finally meets his orangutans.

His book Among Orangutans: Red Apes and the Rise of Human Culture tells the story of his discovery of a group of orangutans in northern Sumatra and the challenge their tool use and sociality pose to theories of primatology and the insights they offer into key moments in human evolution.

Van Schaik is married (with children) to primatologist Maria van Noordwijk.

== Selected publications ==
- van Schaik, C. P., M. Ancrenaz, G. Borgan, B. Galdikas, C.D. Knott, I. Singleton, A. Suzuki, S. Utami, M. Merrill. (2003) Orangutan cultures and the evolution of material culture. Science 299: 102–105.
- van Schaik, C. P. (1982). Why are diurnal primates living in groups? Behaviour, 87, 120–144.
- van Schaik, C. P., Deaner, R. O. and Merrill, M. Y. (1999). The conditions for tool use in primates: implications for the evolution of material culture. Journal of Human Evolution, 36(6), 719–741.
- van Schaik, C. P. and Dunbar, R. I. (1990). The evolution of monogamy in large primates: A new hypothesis and some crucial tests. Behaviour, 115(1–2), 30–62.
- van Schaik, C. P. and Kappeler, P. M. (1996). The social systems of gregarious lemurs: Lack of convergence with anthropoids due to evolutionary disequilibrium? Ethology, 102(11), 915–941.
- van Schaik, C. P. and Kappeler, P. M. (1997). Infanticide risk and the evolution of male-female association in primates. Proceedings of the Royal Society of London, Series B, Biological Sciences, 264(1388), 1687–1694.
- van Schaik, C. P. and Michel, K. (2016) The Good Book of Human Nature: An Evolutionary Reading of the Bible ((in Dutch) Het oerboek van de mens: de evolutie van de Bijbel, 2016)
- van Schaik, C. P. and van Noordwijk, M. A. (1985). Evolutionary effect of the absence of felids on the social organization of the macaques on the island of Simeulue ( Macaca fascicularis fusca, Miller 1903). Folia Primatologica, 44(3–4), 138–147.
- van Schaik, C. P. and van Noordwijk, M. A., Warsono, B. and Sutriono, E. (1983). Party size and early detection of predators in Sumatran forest primates. Primates, 24(2), 211–221.
