= Carrol =

Carrol is both a surname and a given name. Notable people with the name include:

Surname:

- Enitan Carrol
- Lou Carrol
- Regina Carrol

Given name:

- Carrol Boyes
- Carrol Chandler
- J. Carrol Naish

== See also ==
- Carl (disambiguation)
- Carol (disambiguation)
- Carola (disambiguation)
- Carril, surname
- Carroll (given name)
- Carroll (surname)
- Carrols (disambiguation)
