= Carroll Township =

Carroll Township may refer to:

- Carroll Township, Vermilion County, Illinois
- Carroll Township, O'Brien County, Iowa
- Carroll Township, Tama County, Iowa
- Carroll Township, Platte County, Missouri
- Carroll Township, Ottawa County, Ohio
- Carroll Township, Perry County, Pennsylvania
- Carroll Township, Washington County, Pennsylvania
- Carroll Township, York County, Pennsylvania
