= Carole Jahme =

British writer and science communicator

Carole Jahme is a British writer and science communicator. In her early career she was also a performer and TV producer. She is a Fellow of The Royal Society of Arts.

== Career ==
Carole Jahme has a master's degree in evolutionary psychology.

Before becoming a writer and scientist, Jahme was an actor, model and dancer, and she performed in Gerry Cottle's Circus on 'trapeze, tightrope, clowning, acrobatics'. She appeared as a dancer in the 1992 movie Chaplin and acted in Moll Flanders in 1996. In 1996, she was also the producer on a TV documentary called Sex and Scientists: Beauty and the Beast and in 2000, she was the writer, director and producer on a BBC1 television game show called House of Games, hosted by Carol Smilie.

In 2000, Jahme published a book about female primatologists, including Jane Goodall, Dian Fossey and Birutė Galdikas, called Beauty and the Beasts: Woman, Ape and Evolution, and in 2011 a science-fiction novel followed, called Worth Their Weight in Blood. During the period of 2011–2015, she wrote many articles on psychology and primates for The Guardian.

She wrote and performed two shows at the Edinburgh Fringe: Carole Jahme is Sexually Selected in 2004 and Carole Jahme is Bio-diverse! in 2010. The shows were humorous explorations of scientific topics including gender psychology, human evolution and primate conservation. In 2010, she appeared in a documentary on Animal Planet called Michael Jackson and Bubbles: The Untold Story.

She is currently working on several writing projects as well as researching the evolution of empathy for an anthropology doctorate at University College London.

== Awards ==
- 2004, Wellcome Trust Award for communicating science to the public
- 2010, European Commission Award for comedy-theatre science production
- 2012, Science and Technology Facilities Council Award for public engagement
