= Oh Carol =

Oh Carol may refer to:

- "Oh! Carol", a 1958 Neil Sedaka song
- Oh Carol (1970 album), a compilation album by Neil Sedaka
- Oh Carol (1974 album), a compilation album by Neil Sedaka
- Oh Carol: The Complete Recordings, 1955–66, a 2003 8-CD box with previously unreleased materials from Neil Sedaka
- "Oh Carol" (Smokie song), a 1978 song by Smokie from the album The Montreux Album
- "Oh Carol", a 1995 song by Boyzone from the album Said and Done
- Oh Carol!, a Singaporean sitcom
