= R v Carroll =

Judgement of the High Court of Australia

- Court: High Court of Australia
- Full case name: The Queen v Raymond John Carroll
- Decided: 5 December 2002
- Citation: (2002) 213 CLR 635

Case history
- Prior action: R v Carroll (1985) 19 A Crim R 410 - original murder trial - perjury trial in the Supreme Court of Queensland - Queensland Court of Appeal decision
- Subsequent action: none

Court membership
- Judges sitting: Gleeson CJ, Gaudron, McHugh, Gummow & Hayne JJ

Case opinions
- (5:0) the perjury proceedings should have been stayed, as the Queensland Court of Appeal ordered, because the new trial breached the principle of double jeopardy, and was an abuse of process (per curiam)

R v Carroll (2002) 213 CLR 635; [2002] HCA 55 is a decision of the High Court of Australia which unanimously upheld the decision by a Queensland appellate court to stay an indictment for perjury as the indictment was found to controvert the respondent's earlier acquittal for murder. The court held that charging Raymond John Carroll with perjuring himself in the earlier murder trial by swearing he did not kill the baby Deidre Kennedy was tantamount to claiming he had committed the murder and was thus a contravention of the principles of double jeopardy. The case caused widespread public outcry and prompted calls for double jeopardy law reform.

== Background ==
In October 1983, Carroll was interviewed by the police in relation to the murder of Deidre Maree Kennedy, a baby whose body had been found on the roof of a toilet block in Ipswich, Queensland, in April 1973. A post-mortem at the time had determined Deidre died of strangulation. During the post-mortem bite marks and bruises were noted on the baby's legs, and it was these marks which led police to charge Carroll over the murder, as odontological evidence matched the marks with Carroll's teeth. Carroll was charged with murder.

The murder trial started on 18 February 1985. The prosecution's case was that the teeth marks on Deidre's body were made by Carroll, that he had a propensity for biting small children on the legs and that his alibi was false. Carroll claimed he was at RAAF Base Edinburgh in South Australia at the time of Deidre's death. The jury found him guilty of murder, but the conviction was quashed on appeal. The court of appeal found that the prosecution had led no evidence to disprove Carroll's claim that he was not in Ipswich at the time of the death, that the evidence relating to Carroll's propensity to bite children's legs was prejudicial and inadmissible and that a jury must have entertained a reasonable doubt as to the odontological evidence presented by the prosecution. During the trial, Carroll denied killing the child under oath, thereby committing perjury. The court had to determine whether a perjury charge would infringe the common law rule against double jeopardy.

== Perjury trial ==
By 1999 the police had received substantial new evidence in relation to the case. A witness had come forward who placed Carroll in Ipswich at the time of the killing, another witness claimed Carroll had admitted to him in jail that he had killed Deidre and further evidence relating to the teeth marks was obtained. Carroll was charged with perjury on 12 February 1999. The indictment presented against Carroll claimed he had perjured himself at the 1985 murder trial by swearing he did not kill Deidre Kennedy. In November 2000 a jury convicted him of perjury. Carroll appealed against this conviction.

=== Supreme Court of Queensland - Court of Appeal ===
The Queensland appeal court upheld Carroll's appeal. They found the perjury trial was in essence a re-trial of the original murder trial and that the prosecution case amounted to an abuse of process that contravened principles of double jeopardy. While the court applied an earlier decision by the Queensland Supreme Court, R v El-Zarw, which held that a prosecution such as this would not be an abuse of process if there was substantial new evidence, they found that the evidence presented by the prosecution in the perjury trial was not substantial. The prosecution appealed against this decision.

=== High Court of Australia ===
The High Court dismissed the appeal, finding that a conviction for perjury would inevitably controvert Carroll's previous acquittal for murder and was thus inconsistent with double jeopardy principles. The High Court also ruled that this principle applied whether substantial new evidence had come to light, overruling Queensland authority to that effect. The courts ruling in this case was due to technicality which was established to prevent double jeopardy.

== Public response ==
There was widespread public outcry following this decision. The general perception was that a person who had been found guilty by two juries of murdering a baby had "got off" on a "legal technicality".

Then-Queensland premier Peter Beattie stated that "there was an injustice done in this case". New South Wales premier Bob Carr began a law reform process and the Victorian attorney general, Rob Hulls canvassed the possibility of legislative change.

The Kennedy family told their side of the story in a 2003 ABC Australian Story episode, "Double Bind".

Carroll gave his side of the story in a 60 Minutes interview in 2006.

The double jeopardy law has since been changed through the Criminal Code (Double Jeopardy) Amendment Act 2007 (Qld).
