= Carril =

Carril is a surname. Notable people with the name include:

- Dani Carril (born 1980), Spanish footballer
- Esteban Carril (born 1977), Spanish tennis player and coach
- Iván Carril (born 1985), Spanish footballer
- Jonathan Carril (born 1984), Spanish footballer
- Pete Carril (1930–2022), American basketball coach
- Vicente López Carril (1942–1980), Spanish road racing cyclist

== See also ==
- Caril, given name
- Carrel, surname
- Carrol, given name and surname
- Del Carril, surname
