= Monroe J. Carell Jr. =

American businessman and philanthropist

- Born: 1932
- Died: June 19, 2008 (aged 75–76)
- Resting place: Mount Olivet Cemetery
- Education: Father Ryan High School; Vanderbilt University
- Occupation: Businessman
- Spouse: Ann Scott
- Children: 3 daughters

Monroe J. Carell Jr. (1932 – June 19, 2008) was an American businessman and philanthropist. He was the chairman and CEO of Central Parking Corporation.

== Early life ==
Monroe Carell was a graduate of Father Ryan High School and earned a degree in electrical engineering from Vanderbilt University in 1959.

== Career ==
Carell cofounded Central Parking with Richard Dennis in 1967. By 1980, he had bought out his business partner, and the firm was the fourth largest parking company in the United States. The company went public in 1995, and in 1997 with an estimated worth of $600 million, Carell made the Forbes 400 list. Central Parking was bought by a private equity firm in 2007, and the Carell family, owning nearly half of the shares, walked away with nearly $350 million.

== Philanthropy ==
The Carell family has funded several scholarships and construction projects in the Nashville area. The Monroe Carell Jr. Children's Hospital at Vanderbilt in Nashville, Tennessee is named in recognition of his financial contribution. In 2001, he received the Distinguished Alumnus Award from the Vanderbilt University School of Engineering. In 2008, he was named the Nashvillian of the Year by the Easter Seals of Tennessee

== Personal life ==
Carell was married to Ann Scott (1935–2012) for fifty-two years, and they had three daughters.

== Death ==
Carell died on June 19, 2008.
