= Carrols =

Carrols may refer to:

- Carrols Restaurant Group, largest franchisee of Burger King
- Carrols (Finland), former franchise of original US Carrols chain
- Carrolls, Washington, an unincorporated community
