= Crell's Annalen =

Chemische Annalen für die Freunde der Naturlehre, Arzneygelahrtheit, Haushaltungskunst und Manufakturen
- Discipline: Chemistry
- Language: German
- Edited by: Lorenz Florenz Friedrich von Crell

Publication details
- Former names: Chemisches Journal; Die neuesten Entdeckungen in der Chemie
- History: Founded in 1778

Standard abbreviations
- ISO 4: Chem. Ann. Freunde Nat. Arzneygelahrtheit Haushalt. Manufakturen

Crell's Annalen is a German chemistry journal. It was originally named Chemisches Journal, then Die neuesten Entdeckungen in der Chemie, and later Chemische Annalen für die Freunde der Naturlehre, Arzneygelährtheit, Haushaltungskunst und Manufakturen, which is usually shortened to Chemische Annalen and often referred to as Crell's Annalen after the editor Lorenz Florenz Friedrich von Crell (1744–1816), professor of theoretical medicine and materia medica at the University of Helmstedt; it was first published in 1778.
