= Lorenz Florenz Friedrich von Crell =

German chemist (1744–1816)

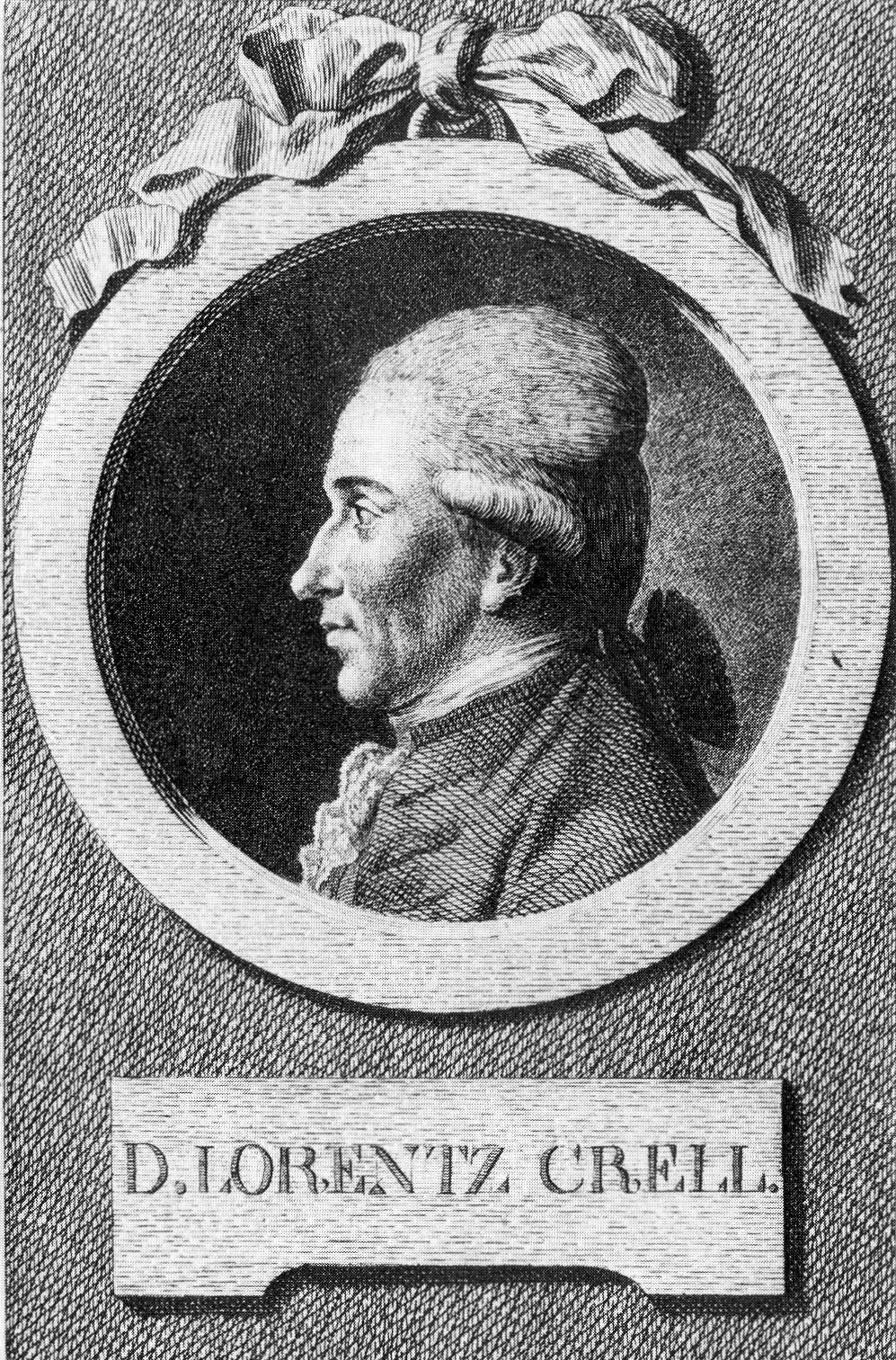
- Born: 21 January 1744; Helmstedt
- Died: 7 June 1816 (aged 71); Göttingen
- Education: University of Helmstedt
- Known for: Publishing the first periodical journal on chemistry starting 1778
- Scientific career
- Fields: Chemist
- Workplaces: Collegium Carolinum, Braunschweig; University of Helmstedt; University of Göttingen
- Doctoral advisor: Gottfried Christoph Beireis

Lorenz Florenz Friedrich von Crell (21 January 1744 – 7 June 1816) was a German chemist. In 1778 he started publishing the first periodical journal focusing on chemistry. The journal had a longer title but was known simply as Crell's Annalen.

== Life and work ==
Lorenz Crell was born in the Duchy of Brunswick's university town of Helmstedt as the son of medical professor Johann Friedrich Crell and grandchild of medical professor Lorenz Heister, who achieved renown in surgery and botany. At the age of fourteen, he entered the University of Helmstedt where, after nearly a decade of taking courses offered by the philosophical and medical faculties, he took his M.D. in 1768. He then made a two-year study tour to Göttingen, Strasbourg, Paris, Edinburgh, and London. In 1771, soon after his return to the Duchy of Brunswick, Crell secured an appointment in Braunschweig's Collegium Carolinum as professor of metallurgy. Three years later, he relocated to the University of Helmstedt as a professor of medicine responsible for theoretical medicine and materia medica. Starting in 1783 till 1810 he was a professor of philosophy and medicine at the University of Helmstedt and from 1810 till his death in 1816 he was a professor of chemistry at the University of Göttingen.

Front cover

In 1778 Crell published the first issue of the Chemische Journal für die Freunde der Naturlehre, Arzneygelahrtheit, Haushaltungskunst und Manufacturen. He changed his journal's name two times, ending up in 1784 with Crell's Annalen. This periodic journal was the first journal focusing primarily on chemistry. Crell stopped publishing the journal in 1804 after the concurrence of the chemical journal of Alexander Nicolaus Scherer and Adolph Ferdinand Gehlen, today published as Journal für praktische Chemie became too strong.

Crell was involved in the sometimes harsh discussion about the phlogiston theory. The experiments of Antoine-Laurent Lavoisier showed that the up to that point accepted theory was probably wrong. Von Crell translated some articles of Richard Kirwan, a supporter of the phlogiston theory. Von Crell defended the theory until 1799 and never openly accepted that it was wrong.

Crell was elected into the German Academy of Sciences Leopoldina in 1778 and the American Philosophical Society in 1786. In 1780 the Duke of Brunswick made him a Bergrat (administrator of mining) and in 1781 he was nobled by the emperor Leopold II (his name changed from Crell to von Crell).
