= Carel =

Carel is a given name, and may refer to:

== Arts ==
- Carel Blotkamp, Dutch artist and art historian
- Carel de Moor, Dutch etcher and painter
- Carel Fabritius, Dutch painter and one of Rembrandt's most gifted pupils
- Carel van Mander, Flemish painter, poet and biographer
- Carel Vosmaer, Dutch poet and art-critic
- Jacques-Philippe Carel (fl. 1723–1760), Parisian cabinet-maker

== Education ==
- Carel Gabriel Cobet, Dutch classical scholar
- Carel van Schaik, Dutch professor and director of the Anthropological Institute and Museum at the University of Zürich, Switzerland

== Other fields ==
- Carel Godin de Beaufort, Dutch nobleman and Formula One driver
- Carel Victor Gerritsen (1850–1905), Dutch radical politician
- Carel Jan Scheneider, Dutch foreign service diplomat and writer
- Carel Struycken, character actor in film, television, and stage
- Johan Carel Marinus Warnsinck, Dutch naval officer and naval historian
- Tobias Michael Carel Asser, Dutch jurist
