= Rachel (given name) =

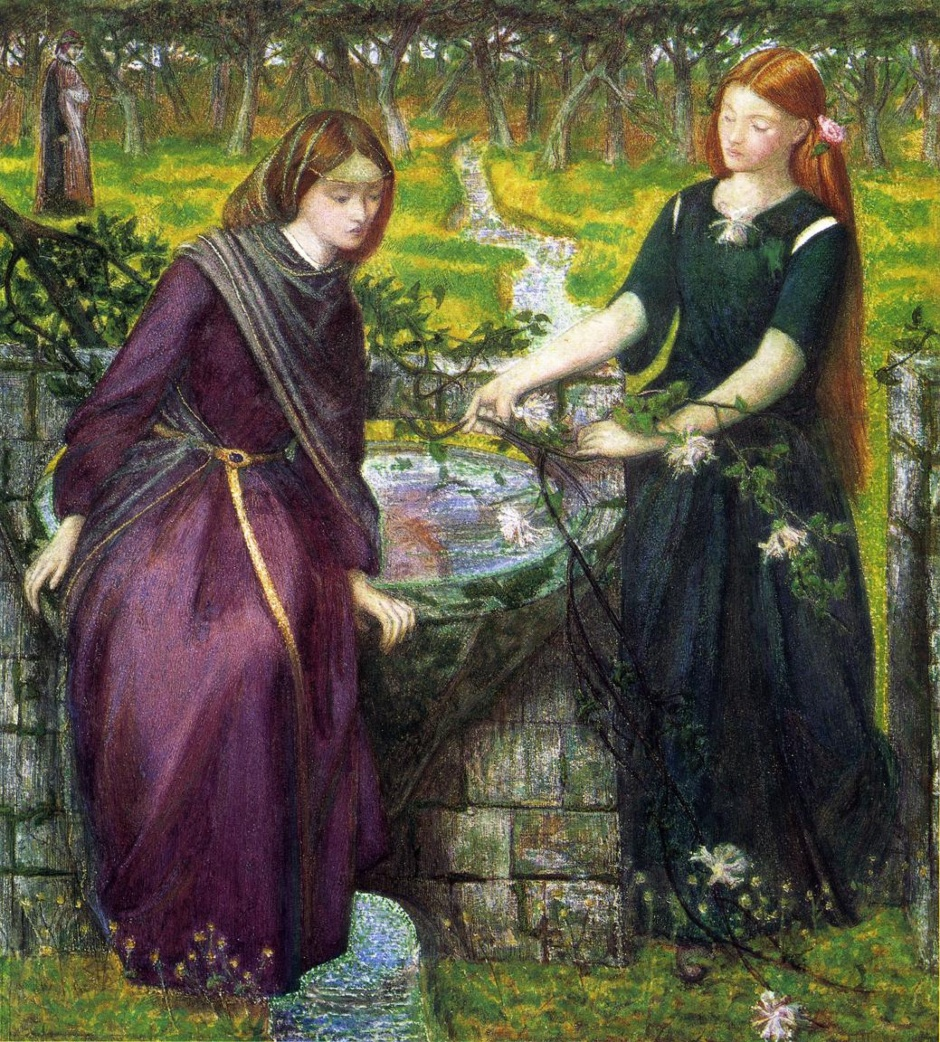
- Dante's Vision of Rachel and Leah, the Biblical Rachel and Leah by Dante Gabriel Rossetti (1855)
- Pronunciation: English: /ˈreɪtʃəl/ RAY-chəl; French: [ʁaʃɛl] German Standard German: [ˈʁaxl̩] Austrian and Swiss Standard German: [ˈraxl̩] Dutch: [ˈrɑxəl] Yiddish: [ˈrɔχl̩] Hungarian: [ˈraːɦɛl] Scottish Gaelic: [ˈrˠaxəl]
- Gender: Female

Origin
- Origin: Hebrew
- Meaning: 'ewe; one with purity'

Other names
- Nicknames: Rae, Rach
- Related names: Rachael, Rae, Rahel, Raquel

Rachel (from Hebrew: רָחֵל, Modern: Raḥel [ʁaˈχel], Tiberian: Rāḥēl [rɔːˈħeːl]; lit. 'ewe') is a feminine given name of Hebrew origin, popularized by the biblical figure Rachel, the wife of Israelite patriarch Jacob.

== History of usage ==
Ashkenazi Jewish matronymic surnames Rokhlin (variants: Rochlin, Rohlin), Raskin, Raskine, Rashkin, Rashkind are derived from variants of the name. The Jewish version of the surname Ruskin is an Americanized form of Raskin.

Sixteenth century baptismal records from England show that Rachel was first used by English Christians in the mid-1500s, becoming popular during the Protestant Reformation along with other biblical names.

The name has been among the five hundred most commonly used names in recent years for newborn girls in France, Ireland, Israel, United Kingdom and the United States.

=== In various languages ===
- Rachael, Rachelle, Racquel
- Rachela (Polish)
- Rachele (Italian)
- Rahel (Turkish)
- Raonaid (Scottish Gaelic)
- Ráhel (Hungarian)
- Rahela (Serbian, Romanian, Croatian)
- راحله (Raheleh) (Persian)
- Ráichéal (Irish)
- Ῥαχήλ (Rhachel) (Greek)
- Raakel (Finnish)
- Rakel (Norwegian, Danish, Swedish, Icelandic)
- Rakul (Faroese)
- Raquel (Portuguese, Spanish)
- Рахиль (Rakhil) (Russian)
- Рахіль (Rachiĺ) (Belarusian)

== Women named Rachel ==
Notable people with the name include:

- Rachel, Biblical figure known for being the wife that Jacob loved
- Rachel, wife of Rabbi Akiva (1st century)
- Rachel (born 1942), French singer of the 1960s
- Rachel of Kittery, Maine (died 1695), American slave murdered by her owner
- Rachel Aaron (fl. 2010s–2020s), American author
- Rachel Aberlin, 16th-century Jewish mystic
- Rachel Alejandro (born 1974), Filipino singer and actress
- Rachel Allen (born 1972), Irish celebrity chef
- Rachel Amanda (born 1995), Indonesian actress, singer and model
- Rachel Ames (born 1929), American actress
- Rachel Anderson (born 1943), English journalist and author
- Rachel Anderson (football agent), the UK's first female FIFA-licensed agent
- Rachel Ankeny, professor of history and philosophy of science
- Rachel Antonoff (born 1981), American fashion designer
- Rachel Attas (1934–2004), Israeli actress and singer
- Rokhl Auerbakh (Rachel Auerbach) (1903–1976), Polish-Israeli writer and historian
- Rachel Azaria (born 1977), Israeli politician
- Rachel Baard, South African theologian
- Rachel Tzvia Back, Israeli poet and translator
- Rachel Balkovec (born 1987), American baseball manager
- Rachel Baskerville (born 1951), New Zealand accounting academic
- Rachel Yanait Ben-Zvi (1886–1979), Israeli author and first lady of Israel
- Rachel Bess, American artist
- Rachel Bianchi-Quarshie, Ghanaian pilot
- Rachel Bilson (born 1981), American actress
- Rachel Blanchard, Canadian actress
- Rachel Bloom (born 1987), American actress
- Rachel Bloomekatz (born 1982), American lawyer
- Rachel Bluwstein (1890–1931), Hebrew-language poet from Palestine
- Rachel Bolan, born James Southworth in 1966, American bassist
- Rachel Boston (born 1982), American actress and producer
- Rachel Brand (born 1973), American lawyer and government official
- Rachel Bromwich (1915–2010), British scholar
- Rachel Brosnahan (born 1990), American actress
- Rachel Brown (born 1980), English footballer
- Rachel Burke, American politician
- Rachel Caine (1962–2020), American writer
- Rachel Cameron (1924–2011), American ballet dancer and teacher
- Rachel Campos-Duffy (born 1971), American television personality
- Rachel Carns (born 1969), American musician and artist
- Rachel Carson (1907–1964), American environmentalist, scientist
- Rachel Chalkowski (born 1939), Israeli midwife and gemach organiser
- Rachel Chiesley, Lady Grange (1679–1745), Scottish woman kidnapped by her husband
- Rachel Concho (born 1936), Native American artist and potter
- Rachel Corrie (1973–2003), American political activist and diarist
- Rachel Corsie (born 1989), Scottish footballer
- Rachel Cosgrove Payes (1922–1998), American author
- Rachel Covey (born 1998), American actress
- Rachel Cowan (1941–2018), American rabbi
- Rachel Crow (born 1998), American actress and singer
- Rachel Cusk (born 1967), Canadian-born novelist
- Rachel Daly (born 1991), English footballer
- Rachel Daquis (born 1987), Filipino volleyball player
- Rachel David (born 1996), Indian actress
- Rachel de Lambert (born 1961), Landscape architect in New Zealand
- Rachel de Montmorency (1891–1961), English painter and stained glass artist
- Rachel de Queiroz (1910–2003), Brazilian author, translator, and journalist
- Rachel Lilian Alfreda de Silva (1920–2001), Sri Lankan Sinhala poet, journalist, and screenwriter
- Rachel Dolezal (born 1977), American former civil rights activist
- Rachel Don (1866–1941), New Zealand preacher and activist
- Rachel Dratch (born 1966), American actress
- Rachel Dror (1921–2024), German Holocaust survivor
- Rachel Eckroth, American singer-songwriter and keyboardist
- Rachel Ehrenfeld, American terrorism expert
- Rachel Elior (born 1949), Israeli historian and philosopher
- Rachel Elkind-Tourre (born 1939), American musician and record producer
- Rachel Elnaugh (born 1964), British entrepreneur
- Rachel Ennis (born 1987), British rhythmic gymnast
- Rachel Entwistle (1980–2006), American murder victim
- Rachel Erickson (born 1999), Canadian curler
- Rachel Evans, Welsh chemist
- Rachel Held Evans (1981–2019), American writer
- Rachel Fabri (born 1985), Maltese singer-songwriter
- Rachel Fannan (born 1986), American singer, songwriter, and poet
- Rachel Feinstein (artist) (born 1971), American artist
- Rachel Feinstein (comedian), American actress and stand-up comedian
- Rachel Félix (1821–1858), French actress
- Rachel Lyman Field (1894–1942), American poet, novelist and children's fiction writer
- Rachel G. Fox (born 1996), American actress and singer
- Rachel Freier (born 1965), American judge
- Rachel Fuller (born 1973), British singer-songwriter
- Rachel Furness (born 1988), Northern Irish footballer
- Rachel Garcia (born 1997), American softball player
- Rachel Kaadzi Ghansah (born 1981), American essayist
- Rachel Goswell (born 1971), English singer-songwriter
- Rachel Grant (born 1977), English actress and TV presenter
- Rachel Griffin-Accurso (born 1982), American YouTuber known as Ms. Rachel
- Rachel Griffith (born 1963), British-American economist
- Rachel Griffiths (born 1968), Australian actress and director
- Rachel Eliza Griffiths (born 1978), American poet, novelist, and photographer
- Rachel Gupta (born 2004), Indian model
- Rachel Gurney (1920–2001), English actress
- Rachel Hardiman (born 1961), Irish cricketer
- Rachel M. Harper, American novelist and academic
- Rachel Harris (born 1979), Australian swimmer
- Rachel M. Harter, American statistician
- Rachel Haugh, English architect
- Rachel Henderson, American politician
- Rachel Hill (born 1995), American soccer player
- Rachel Hilson (born 1995), American actress
- Rachel Hirschfeld (1945/1946 – 2018), animal welfare attorney
- Rachel Hoffman (1984–2008), American murder victim
- Rachel Hofstetter (born 1992), American video game streamer
- Rachel Hollis (born 1983), American author and motivational speaker
- Rachel Homan (born 1989), Canadian curler
- Rachel Hopkins (born 1972), British Labour MP
- Rachel Hopkins (cricketer) (born 1992), English cricketer
- Rachel House (actress) (born 1971), New Zealand actress and director
- Rachel Hunter (born 1969), New Zealand supermodel and actress
- Rachel Hurd-Wood (born 1990), British actress
- Rachel Ikemeh, Nigerian conservationist
- Rachel Imison (born 1978), Australian field hockey player
- Rachel Ingalls (1941–2019), American author
- Rachel Isaacs, American rabbi
- Rachel Isadora (born 1953), American children's author, illustrator, and painter
- Rachel Jackson (1767–1828), wife of U.S. President Andrew Jackson
- Rachel Jacobs (1975–2015), American businesswoman
- Rachel Jarry (born 1991), Australian basketball player
- Rachel Jewkes, South African scientist
- Rachel Johnson (born 1965), British journalist, television presenter, and author
- Rachel Johnson (athlete) (born 1993), American track and field athlete
- Rachel Jones, multiple people
- Rachel Joyce, multiple people
- Rachel Keller (born 1992), American actress
- Rachel Kempson (1910–2003), English actress
- Rachel Kerr, British singer-songwriter and entrepreneur
- Rachel Khoo (born 1980), British cook and writer
- Rachel Klamer (born 1990), Dutch triathlete
- Rachel E. Klevit, American biochemist
- Rachel Kolly d'Alba (born 1981), Swiss soloist violinist
- Rachel Korine (born 1986), American actress
- Rachel Kushner (born 1968), American novelist
- Rachel Levine (born 1957), transgender American assistant secretary of health
- Gertrude Rachel Levy (1884–1966), British author and cultural historian
- Rachel Lindsay (television personality) (born 1985), American television personality
- Rachel Llanes (born 1991), American ice hockey player
- Rachel Lloyd (born 1975), British activist
- Rachel Lloyd (1839–1900), American chemist
- Rachel Lowe (born 2000), Australian footballer
- Rachel Luttrell (born 1971), Tanzanian-Canadian actress
- Rachel MacNair (born 1958), American sociologist and psychologist
- Rachel Maddow (born 1973), American journalist
- Rachel Maltby (born 2007), English footballer
- Rachel Meghan Markle (born 1981), Duchess of Sussex and former American actress
- Rachel Marsden (born 1974), Canadian political columnist
- Rachel Mazuir (born 1940), French politician
- Rachel McAdams (born 1978), Canadian actress
- Rachel McAlpine (born 1940), New Zealand poet, novelist, and playwright
- Rachel McCann (field hockey) (born 1993), New Zealand field hockey player
- Rachel McFarlane, British singer
- Rachel McLean (1971–1991), British murder victim
- Rachel McLish (born 1955), American bodybuilder, actress, and author
- Rachel Lambert Mellon (1910–2014), American horticulturalist, philanthropist, and art collector
- Rachel Millward (born 1977), British politician
- Rachel Miner (born 1980), American actress
- Rachel Mitchell (born 1967), American attorney
- Rachel Morrison (born 1978), American cinematographer and director
- Rachel Newton (born 1985), Scottish singer and harpist
- Rachel Neylan (born 1982), Australian cyclist
- Rachel Nicholls, English opera singer
- Rachel Nichols, multiple people
- Rachel Nickell (1968–1992), British murder victim
- Rachel Noerdlinger (born 1970), American publicist
- Rachel Nordlinger, Australian linguist
- Rachel Notley (born 1964), Canadian politician
- Rachel O'Reilly, British chemist
- Rachel O'Riordan (born 1974), Irish theatre director
- Rachel Oakes Preston (1809–1868), American religious figure
- Rachel Oliver (footballer) (born 1971), New Zealand footballer
- Rachel Oliver (scientist), British material scientist
- Rachel Ong (born 1972), Singaporean politician
- Rachel Oniga (1957–2021), Nigerian actress
- Rachel Owen (1968–2016), Welsh photographer, printmaker, and lecturer
- Rachel Owens (born 1972), American sculptor
- Rachel Parish (born 1981), British sportswoman
- Rachel Parris (born 1984), English comedian and actress
- Rachel Parsons, multiple people
- Rachel Paulose (born 1973), American attorney
- Rachel Pavlou, British manager for diversity and inclusion at the Football Association in England
- Rachel Peace (aka Jane Short) (1881 – died after 1932), British feminist and suffragette
- Rachel Perkins (born 1970), Australian director, producer, and screenwriter
- Rachel Peters (born 1991), Miss Universe Philippines 2017
- Rachel Pizzolato, American model and social media influencer
- Rachel Platten (born 1981), American singer and songwriter
- Rachel Pollack (1945–2023), American science fiction writer, comic book writer, and tarot expert
- Rachel Portman (born 1960), British composer
- Rachel Potter (born 1984), American singer and actress
- Rachel Justine Pries, American mathematician
- Rachel Qitsualik-Tinsley, Canadian writer
- Rachel Quon (born 1991), American-Canadian soccer player
- Rachel Rath (born 1976), Irish actress
- Rachel Reeves (born 1979), British MP for the Labour Party
- Rachel Reilly (born 1984), American television personality and actress
- Rachel Reinert (born 1989), American country singer and songwriter
- Rachel Riley (born 1986), British television presenter
- Rachel Rinast (born 1991), Swiss footballer
- Rachel Roberts, multiple people
- Rachel Robinson (born 1922), American professor and nurse
- Rachel Rodriguez-Williams, American politician
- Rachel Rose (born 1970), Canadian poet, essayist, and short story writer
- Rachel Rose (artist) (born 1986), American artist
- Rachel Rossi (born 1983), American criminal justice lawyer
- Rachel Roy (born 1974), American fashion designer
- Rachel Ruysch (1664–1750), Dutch still-life painter
- Rachel Scott (1981–1999), a victim in the Columbine High School massacre
- Rachel Scott (women's education reformer) (1848–1905), British women's education reformer
- Rachel Sebati (born 1993), South African footballer
- Rachel Irene Seibert (1876–1967), American clubwoman
- Rachel Sennott (born 1995), American actress and comedian
- Rachel Shelley (born 1969), English actress and model
- Rachel Shenton, English actress and screenwriter
- Rachel Shoaf (born 1996), American convicted of murder in 2013
- Rachel Smith (born 1985), Miss USA 2007
- Rachel Smith (gymnast) (born 1993), British rhythmic gymnast
- Rachel Squire (1954–2006), British Labour politician
- Rachel Stephens (1930–2011), American actress
- Rachel Stevens (born 1978), English pop singer
- Rachel Stevens (sculptor), American sculptor
- Rachel Stuart (born 1972), Jamaican-Canadian model and actress
- Rachel Sung (born 2004), American table tennis player
- Rachel Sutherland (born 1976), New Zealand field hockey player
- Rachel Sweet (born 1962), American producer, singer, and actress
- Rachel Talalay (born 1958), American director and producer
- Rachel Talbot Ross (born 1961), American politician and activist
- Rachel Thomas (disambiguation), multiple people
- Rachel Ticotin (born 1958), American film and television actress
- Rachel Trachtenburg (born 1993), American rock singer and drummer
- Rachel Treweek (born 1963), British Anglican bishop
- Rachel True (born 1968), American actress
- Rachel Tucker (born 1981), Northern Irish musical theatre actress, and singer
- Rachel Uchitel (born 1975), American nightclub manager and television personality
- Rachel Unitt (born 1982), English footballer
- Rachel Vail (born 1966), American author
- Rachel Vallarelli, American lacrosse player
- Rachel van Cutsen (born 1984), Dutch badminton player
- Rachel van Dantzig (1878–1949), Dutch sculptor
- Rachael Vanderwal (born 1983), British basketball player
- Rachel Van Hollebeke (born 1985), American soccer player
- Rachel Veltri (born 1978), American actress
- Rachel Viollet (born 1972), British tennis player
- Rachel Wacholder (born 1975), American professional beach volleyball player
- Rachel Wade (born 1990), American teenager convicted of murder
- Rachel Walker (disambiguation), several people
- Rachel Ward (born 1957), English-born Australian actress, columnist, film director, and screenwriter
- Rachel Ward, Countess of Dudley, British civic leader, philanthropist, and foundress of nursing orders
- Rachel Ward (mathematician), American applied mathematician
- Rachel Weisz (born 1970), British actress
- Rachel Whetstone (born 1968), British public relations executive
- Rachel White, multiple people
- Rachel Whiteread (born 1963), English sculptor
- Rachel Wiley, American poet, performer and activist
- Rachel Williams (model) (born 1967), American model and television presenter
- Rachel Williams (footballer) (born 1988), English footballer
- Rachel DeLoache Williams (born 1988), American writer
- Rachel Willis-Sørensen (born 1984), American opera singer
- Rachel O. Wingate (c. 1901–1953), English linguist
- Rachel Yakar (1938–2023), French opera singer
- Rachel Yang (born 1982), Singaporean pole vaulter
- Rachel Yankey (born 1979), English footballer
- Rachel Yehuda (born 1959), American psychiatrist and neuroscientist
- Rachel Yeoh, Malaysian socialite and model
- Rachel York (born 1971), American actress and singer
- Rachel Yurkovich (born 1986), American javelin thrower
- Rachel Z, American pianist and keyboardist
- Rachel Zadok (born 1972), South African writer
- Rachel Zajac, New Zealand forensic psychologist
- Rachel Zeffira, Canadian singer
- Rachel Zegler (born 2001), American actress and singer
- Rachel Zilberberg (1920–1943), Polish resistance fighter during World War II
- Rachel Zimmerman (born 1972), Canadian space scientist and inventor
- Rachel Zoe (born 1971), American fashion designer, businesswoman, and writer
- Rachel Zolf (born 1968), Canadian-American poet
- Rachel Zucker (born 1971), American poet

== Women named Rachael ==
- Hecate (musician) (born 1976), born Rachael Kozak, Swiss music producer
- Rachael Anderson (died 2018), American female murder victim
- Rachael Bella (born 1984), American actress
- Rachael Blackmore (born 1989), Irish jockey
- Rachael Blake (born 1971), Australian actress
- Rachael Bland (1978–2018), Welsh BBC newsreader
- Rachael Boyle (born 1991), Scottish footballer
- Rachael Carpani (1980–2025), Australian actress
- Rachael Cox-Davies (1862–1944), British nurse
- Rachael Denhollander (born 1984), American lawyer and former gymnast
- Rachael Leigh Cook (born 1979), American actress
- Rachael Robinson Elmer (1878–1919), American painter
- Rachael Finch (born 1988), Miss Universe Australia 2009
- Rachael Flatt (born 1992), American figure skater
- Rachael Grinham (born 1977), Australian squash player
- Rachael Gunn (born 1987), Australian breakdancer known as Raygun
- Rachael Harris (born 1968), American actress and comedian
- Rachael Heyhoe Flint (1939–2017), English cricketer
- Rachael Lampa (born 1985), American singer/songwriter
- Rachael Letsche (born 1991), British trampoline gymnast
- Rachael Lillis (1969–2024), American voice actress
- Rachael MacFarlane (born 1976), American voice actress
- Rachael McLaren, Canadian dancer
- Rachael Pratt (1874–1954), Australian army nurse
- Rachael Price (born 1985), American jazz vocalist
- Rachael Ray (born 1968), American celebrity chef and television personality
- Rachael Runyan (1979–1982), American murder victim
- Rachael Sage, American songwriter
- Rachael Scdoris (born 1985), blind American dog musher and cross country runner
- Rachael Sporn (born 1968), Australian female basketball player
- Rachael Stirling (born 1977), British actress
- Rachael Stolzenberg-Solomon, American epidemiologist and dietitian
- Rachael Taylor (born 1984), Australian actress
- Rachael Yamagata (born 1977), American singer-songwriter

== Women named Rachelle ==
- Rachelle Ferrell (born 1961), American vocalist and musician
- Rachelle Ann Go (born 1986), Filipina singer
- Rachelle Keck, American lawyer and academic administrator
- Rachelle Lefevre (born 1979), Canadian actress
- Rachelle Smit, American politician

== Women named Rachele ==
- Rachele Baldi (born 1994), Italian footballer
- Rachele Barbieri (born 1997), Italian road and track cyclist
- Rachele Bruni (born 1990), Italian swimmer
- Rachele Fassera (born 1946), Italian nun and missionary
- Rachele Gilmore, American soprano
- Rachele Lynae (born 1988), American country rock singer
- Rachele Mori (born 2003), Italian hammer thrower
- Rachele Mussolini (1890–1979), wife of Italian dictator Benito Mussolini
- Rachele Mussolini (politician) (born 1974), Italian politician
- Rachele Risaliti (born 1995), Italian model
- Rachele Sangiuliano (born 1981), Italian volleyball player
- Rachele Brooke Smith (born 1987), American actor and dancer
- Alice Rachele Arlanch (born 1995), Italian beauty pageant winner

== Fictional characters named Rachel (or variants thereof) ==
- Rachael, Dickens characters in Bleak House and in Hard Times.
- Rachel, one of the six main characters of Animorphs
- Rachel, a character from the Rhapsody in Blue segment of the Disney movie Fantasia 2000
- Rachel, a character in Stephen King's short story The raft
- Rachael, a replicant in the science fiction film Blade Runner
- Rachel, a friend of Vivian Ward and Kit DeLuca in the romantic movie Pretty Woman
- Rachel, a character in Pokémon Masters EX
- Rachael (Battle Arena Toshinden), a character in the Battle Arena Toshinden fighting game series
- Rachel, a female warrior from the Ninja Gaiden series of video games
- Naughty Rachel, in the British TV Series Green Wing
- Rachel Aldridge, Lady Sinderby, a character introduced in season 5 of the TV show Downton Abbey
- Rachel Alucard, in the BlazBlue video game series
- Rachel Amber, a side character in Life Is Strange and a main character in its spinoff, Life Is Strange: Before the Storm
- Rachel Berry, in the television series Glee
- Rachel Santiago-Bravante, a character from the Filipino drama series Asawa Ko, Karibal Ko
- Rachel Brown, in the play Inherit the Wind
- Rachel Buchman, a character in Rachel getting married
- Rachel Carruthers, in the Halloween film series
- Rachel Chu, in the American romantic comedy-drama film Crazy Rich Asians
- Rachel Creed, wife of the main character in Stephen King's 1983 horror novel Pet Sematary
- Rachel Elizabeth Dare, in the young adult book series Percy Jackson & the Olympians
- Rachel Dalles, a character in the Black Butler manga series and anime
- Rachel Dawes, Assistant District Attorney in the Batman series of movies
- Rachel Duncan, in the TV show Orphan Black
- Rachel Finer, in the Netflix series Grand Army
- Rachel Gardner, in the Angels of Death video game
- Rachel Gatina, in the TV show One Tree Hill
- Rachel Gibson, in Season 5 of Alias
- Rachel Green, in the TV series Friends
- Rachel Greene, a character in the TV series ER, daughter of Mark Greene
- Rachel Hardy, a character from the British soap opera Hollyoaks
- Rachel Kinski, a character in the Australian soap opera Neighbours
- Rachel Lang, the main character in The Rage: Carrie 2
- Rachel Larsen, a.k.a. Rikka Hishikawa, in the anime DokiDoki! PreCure
- Rachel Leighton, also known as Diamondback in Marvel Comics
- Rachel Lynde, a supporting character in Lucy Maud Montgomery's 1908 novel Anne of Green Gables
- Rachel Mason, Headmistress of Waterloo Road in the BBC drama Waterloo Road
- Rachel Menken, Don Draper's client's daughter and a love interest in Mad Men
- Rachel Moore, of Case Closed (Detective Conan)
- Rachel Quinn, a character in Chrononauts and Chrononauts: Futureshock
- Rachel Raskin, a character in The Fairly OddParents: Fairly Odder
- Rachel Roth, the false civilian name of Raven
- Rachel Spies, a minor character in Stephen King's Carrie
- Rachel Summers, a character in the Marvel Universe, daughter of Scott Summers and Jean Grey
- Rachel T. McKenzie (Numbuh 362), from the Cartoon Network animated series Codename: Kids Next Door
- Rachel Taub, a supporting character on the TV show House, the wife of Dr. Chris Taub
- Rachel Teller, a character in the Need for Speed Underground 2
- Rachel Tice, a recurring character in the web series The Most Popular Girls in School
- Rachel Van Helsing, a character in Marvel Comics
- Rachel Walker, a main character in the Rainbow Magic book franchise
- Rachel Wilson, a minor character in the Cartoon Network series The Amazing World of Gumball
- Rachel Zane, a character in the American TV show Suits
- Rachel, a character in the manga and anime series Edens Zero who is the mother of the main heroine Rebecca Bluegarden

== Variant names ==
- Rae, Rachey, Rahel, Rocha, Rochel, Rochie, Rochale, Rochele, Rochlin, Recha, Reche, Reichil, Rela, Releh, Relin, Reiyelina, Rekel, Rikel, Rikla, Rikle, Rasha, Rashe, Rashi, Rashel, Rachelle, Rashil, Rashka, Rashke
- Rashka, Rashke, Slavic-language-influences Ashkenazi Jewish Yiddish-language, diminutive
- Recha, a diminutive; an example is Rachel (Recha), the daughter of the protagonist of the 1779 play Nathan the Wise.
- Rachelsea, a portmanteau of the names Rachel and Chelsea

== See also ==
- Raquel (includes Racquel)
- Rokhlin (includes Rochlin)
