= Baskerville (surname) =

Baskerville is an English surname of Anglo-Norman origin. It is believed to have been used by Norman invaders from Bacqueville (Bacqueville-en-Caux, Sancte Mariae de Baschevilla 1133; Baschevillam, Baskervilla 1155, Baccheville 1176, Bascervilla 1179) in Normandy, many of whom settled along the English-Welsh border.

At the time of the British Census of 1881, its relative frequency was highest in Herefordshire (16.2 times the British average), followed by Cheshire, Devon, Radnorshire, Oxfordshire, Brecknockshire, Cornwall, Wigtownshire, Carmarthenshire and Staffordshire. It has also been corrupted to Basketfield in some families.

The name Baskerville may refer to:

- Albert Henry Baskerville (1882–1908), New Zealand rugby player
- Charles Baskerville (1870–1922), American chemist
- Charles Baskerville (1896–1994), American painter, son of the above
- Howard Baskerville (1885–1909), American missionary in Iran
- John Baskerville (1706–1775), typographer
- John David Baskerville (1857–1926), Canadian politician
- Lorrainne Sade Baskerville (1951–2026), American social worker and activist
- Micah Baskerville (born 1999), American football player
- Paul Baskerville (born 1961), British-German music journalist
- Rachel Baskerville (born 1951), New Zealand accounting academic
- Steve Baskerville (born 1950), American television weather presenter
- Robin Baskerville (born 1950), British diver and gymnastics coach
- Ralph de Baskerville, son of Robert de Basqueville who held Eardisley Castle

== Fiction ==
- William of Baskerville, a fictional character in The Name of the Rose by Umberto Eco.
- In The Hound of the Baskervilles, Arthur Conan Doyle suggests the family are of Irish descent. Sir Henry Baskerville has 'the rounded head of the Celt which carries inside it a Celtic enthusiasm and power of attachment'. (Celt may also refer to Welsh origin which is more likely as the Baskerville name is used in Hertfordshire and welsh borders)
- A prominent group of characters in the Japanese manga Pandora Hearts uses the surname.

== See also ==
- Baskerville typeface
- Baskerville (disambiguation)
- The Hound of the Baskervilles
- The Hound of the Baskervilles (disambiguation)
