= Baskerville (disambiguation) =

Baskerville is a typeface.

Baskerville may also refer to:

- Baskerville (surname)
- Baskerville, Virginia, a census-designated place in Mecklenburg County, Virginia, United States
- Baskerville, Western Australia
- Baskerville House, a building in Birmingham, England
- Baskerville Raceway, a motor racing circuit near Hobart, Australia
- Baskerville, a fictional dog in the gamebook The Curse of Batterslea Hall
- William of Baskerville, the main character of the novel The Name of the Rose

== See also ==
- The Hound of the Baskervilles (disambiguation)
