= Eddie Martinez =

Eddie Martinez may refer to:

- Eddie Martinez (musician)
- Eddie Martinez (artist)
