= Rahel =

Rahel is a feminine given name related to Rachel and may refer to:

- Rachel (romanized Rāḥēl), in the Bible the wife of Jacob and mother of Joseph and Benjamin
- Rahel la Fermosa (c. 1165–1195), Jewish paramour of King Alfonso VIII of Castille
- Rahel Aschwanden (born 1993), Swiss table tennis player
- Rahel Daniel (born 2001), Eritrean long-distance runner
- Rahel Enzler (born 2000), Swiss ice hockey player
- Rahel Frey (born 1986), Swiss racing driver
- Rahel Friederich (born 1986), Swiss orienteering competitor
- Rahel Graf (born 1989), Swiss footballer
- Rahel Hirsch (1870–1953), German physician and professor, first female professor of medicine in the Kingdom of Prussia
- Rahel Indermaur (born 1980), Swiss opera singer
- Rahel Jaeggi (born 1967), Swiss philosopher
- Rahel Kiwic (born 1991), Swiss footballer
- Rahel Kopp (born 1994), Swiss alpine ski racer
- Rahel Michielin (born 1990), Swiss ice hockey player
- Rahel Plaut (1894–1993), German medical doctor, researcher in physiology and first female academic at Hamburg University School of Medicine
- Rahel Repkin (born 1998), Estonian footballer
- Rahel Sanzara, pseudonym of German dancer, actress and novelist Johanna Bleschke (1894–1936)
- Rahel Steinschneider (born 1994), Israeli footballer
- Rahel Straus (1880–1963), pioneering German-Jewish medical doctor, feminist and writer
- Rahel Szalit-Marcus (1888–1942), Jewish artist and illustrator
- Rahel Varnhagen (1771–1833), German writer
- Rahel Tschopp (born 2000), Swiss footballer
- Rahel Vigdozchik (born 1989), Israeli rhythmic gymnast and coach
- Rahel Yohannes (1947 – 2026), Ethiopian singer, instrumentalist and songwriter

== See also ==
- Rahel Romahn (born c. 1993), Kurdish-Iraqi-born Australian actor
