= Hilary Pecis =

American artist (born 1979)

- Born: 1979 (age 46–47); Fullerton, California
- Education: California College of the Arts
- Spouse: Andrew Schoultz
- Children: 1

Hilary Pecis (born 1979) is an American contemporary artist based in Los Angeles whose work focuses on subjects of everyday life in both interior spaces and landscapes. Her work has been shown in national and international exhibitions, and can also be found in the permanent collections of several museums.

== Early life and education ==
Hilary Pecis was born in 1979 in Fullerton, California, moving soon after to Redding, California, where she grew up alongside her two siblings. Growing up, she watched Mark Kistler on the PBS show The Secret City Adventures, to which she and her siblings would follow along with his instructions, making a big impression on Pecis and sparking her interest in art. Although her parents were not artists, they encouraged their children to use their creativity and imagination. During high school, as Pecis began to consider art more seriously; she enrolled in Advanced Placement (AP) art classes, where her art teacher encouraged her to continue her art practice.

Pecis attended the California College of the Arts, where she received her Bachelor of Fine Arts degree in 2006. After completing her BFA, she moved to New York for a brief period in her life, where she worked as a day bartender before returning to California. She went on to receive her Master of Fine Arts degree from her alma mater in 2009.

== Work ==
During her time as a student in college, Pecis' early works focused on maximalism, taking the form of abstract collaged pieces. These works followed the popular medium of the time. She used paper, magazine scraps, spray paint, ink and occasionally glitter to create these collages. She also made digital collages, sometimes cutting these up as well to use for her paper collage.

In 2014, Pecis, her husband Andrew Schoultz, and their son, who was then two, moved to Los Angeles where she made the switch from collage work to painting, which was her second area of focus in her artmaking. She began working at David Kordansky Gallery as a registrar and pursued art as a hobby during her free time. In 2019, Pecis left her job at the gallery to become a full-time artist.

As of 2020, the studio she works from, a warehouse located in Frogtown, includes four other women artists; Ruby Neri, Lily Stockman, Megan Reed, and Austyn Weiner.

Pecis' work has been a part of numerous group and solo exhibitions as well as in the permanent collections of the National Gallery of Art in Washington, D.C., Los Angeles County Museum of Art, Columbus Museum of Art, Palm Springs Art Museum, and Aïshti Foundation in Beirut.

The artist is represented by Timothy Taylor (in London).

== Approach and process ==
Hilary Pecis' subject matter consists of intimate everyday scenes taking the form of still lifes and landscapes. She works from reference photos on her phone (usually taken by herself), which serves as a starting place for her to build off. She then sketches the composition onto the canvas and begins painting until the piece reaches a finishing point.

Pecis' primary medium is acrylic paint on canvas. She uses a brand of paint called Nova Color, a local brand based in Culver City. The use of acrylic within her work allows her to achieve the distinct flatness of her work, which draws her to this medium.

She is influenced by artists David Hockney, Henri Matisse, Pierre Bonnard, and André Derain. Her work is often compared to that of Hockney and Matisse for her vivid use of color.

=== Still Lifes ===
Pecis' still lifes include various interior spaces based on people's homes, often including her own. Her approach to these interiors involves focusing on one item at a time within the composition, leading to a unique take on perspective.

Although Pecis' still life pieces do not directly depict any figures, the spaces themselves serve as a portrait, telling a story of who occupies the space. This quality makes these pieces feel lived in and brings them to life.

=== Landscape and streetscape ===
Pecis takes a different approach to her landscapes, quickly sketching them out to get a sense of how to depict them as a way to understand the more abstract nature of the subject. She finds much inspiration through living in Los Angeles, which she applies to her streetscapes. The reference material for many of her landscape and streetscape works often comes from photographs she takes on her phone while out running or traveling.

== Selected solo exhibitions ==
- 2011 Hilary Pecis, Galleria Glance, Turin, Italy
- 2012 Hilary Pecis, In Accordance, Halsey McKay Gallery, East Hampton, NY
- 2011 Hilary Pecis, Desert Paintings, Halsey McKay Gallery, East Hampton, NY
- 2018 Familiar Views, Guerrero Gallery, San Francisco, CA
- 2019 Hilary Pecis, Adios Verano, Halsey McKay Gallery, East Hampton, NY
- 2020 Delivered by the Foehn Winds, SPURS Gallery, Beijing, China
- 2020 The Space in Between, Crisp-Ellert Art Museum, Flagler College, St. Augustine, FL
- 2021 Hilary Pecis, Stairs, Halsey McKay Gallery, East Hampton, NY
- 2021 Piecemeal Rhythm, Timothy Taylor Gallery, London, UK
- 2021 Art in Focus, Art Production Fund, Rockefeller Center, New York, NY
- 2022 Warmly, Rachel Uffner Gallery, New York, NY
- 2023 Paths Crossed, David Kordansky Gallery, Los Angeles, CA
- 2023 Orbiting, TAG Art Museum, Qingdao, China

== Selected artwork ==
- Flea Market (2021)
- Tulips, Ranunculus, and Oranges (2021)
- Clementine's Bookshelf (2021)
- Bar Bathroom (2022)
- North Hollywood Strip Mall (2022)
- Southern Rim (2022)

== Residencies and awards ==
- 2008 Murphy and Cadogan Fellowship, SF Arts Commission
- 2009 Aurobora Press Residency
- 2011 Heroes and Hearts, San Francisco General Hospital
