= Rakel =

Rakel is a Scandinavian feminine given name meaning "ewe", or "sheep", equivalent to the English Rachel.

People named Rakel include:

- Rakel Dögg Bragadóttir (born 1986), Icelandic handball coach and former player
- Rakel Dink (born 1959), Turkish-Armenian human rights activist
- Rakel Engesvik (born 1998), Norwegian footballer
- Rakel Feldmann, Jewish woman killed, along with her husband, by their guides while trying to escape the Holocaust - see Feldmann case
- Rakel Helmsdal (born 1966), Faroese author and artist
- Rakel Hiltunen (born 1940), Finnish social worker and politician
- Rakel Hönnudóttir (born 1988), Icelandic footballer
- Rakel Karvelsson (born 1977), American former soccer player
- Rakel Laakso (1904–1985), Finnish film actress
- Rakel Liehu (born 1939), Finnish writer
- Rakel Liekki (born 1979), Finnish artist, freelance journalist, writer, director and producer and former pornographic actress
- Rakel Logadóttir (born 1981), Icelandic footballer
- Rakel Mateo (born 1975), Spanish paratriathlete
- Rakel Rodríguez (born 1977), Spanish dancer, choreographer and actress
- Rakel Seweriin (1906–1995), Norwegian politician and Norwegian Minister of Social Affairs
- Rakel Surlien (1944–2025), Norwegian judge, civil servant and politician, Norwegian Minister of the Environment
- Rakel Wahl (1921–2005), Norwegian cross-country skier
- Rakel Wärmländer (born 1980), Swedish actress

== See also ==
- Raquel
- Rachel (given name)
- Rakels, a surname
