= Tschopp =

Tschopp is a surname. Notable people with the surname include:

- Evelyne Tschopp (born 1991), Swiss judoka
- Johann Tschopp (born 1982), Swiss cyclist
- Jürg Tschopp (1951–2011), Swiss biochemist and immunologist
- Marcel Tschopp (born 1974), Liechtenstein long-distance runner
- Marco Tschopp (born 1978), Swiss footballer
- Marie-Christine Tschopp (born 1951), French footballer
- Johann Tschopp (born 1982), Swiss mountain bike racer
- Rahel Tschopp (born 2000), Swiss footballer
- Romy Tschopp (born 1993), Swiss para-snowboarder
- Willy Tschopp (1905–1987), Swiss sprinter

== See also ==
- 29881 Tschopp, a minor planet
- Tschop (disambiguation)
