= Rokhlin =

Rokhlin is a Slavic language-influenced Jewish surname of matronymic derivation. It literally means "Rokhl's", where "Rokhl" is a transcription of Rochl, a Yiddish form of the name Rachel. Variants include Rohlin, Rochlin and (via French) Rochline. The feminine form in Slavic cultures is Rokhlina / Rochlina.

Notable people with this surname include:

== Rokhlin ==
- Lev Rokhlin, Russian Lieutenant-General and politician
- Vladimir Abramovich Rokhlin, Soviet mathematician
- Vladimir Rokhlin Jr., American mathematician and professor at Yale University, son of the above

== Rochlin ==
- Davida Rochlin, American architect
- Emma Rochlin, Scottish field hockey player
- Irma Rochlin, American politician from Florida

== Rohlin ==
- Charlotte Rohlin
- Kimmo Rohlin
- Leif Rohlin

== Other ==
- Vera Rockline (1896–1934), birth name Vera Nikolayevna Rokhlina, Russian post-impressionist painter

== See also ==
- Rashkin (surname)
- Raskin
