= Rachel Nicol =

Rachel Nicol may refer to:

- Rachel Nicol (physician) (1845–1881), founder of Pi Beta Phi and a physician
- Rachel Nicol (swimmer) (born 1993), Canadian competitive swimmer

== See also ==
- Rachel Nichols (disambiguation)
- Killing of Rachel Nickell (1968–1992), British murder victim
