= ZieherSmith =

Coordinates: 40.746062°N 74.006879°W

ZieherSmith is a contemporary art gallery founded in New York City in 2003 and run by Andrea Smith Zieher and Scott Zieher. In 2019, the gallery relocated to Nashville and is currently located in Edgehill at 1207 South Street.

Gallery exhibitions have been widely reviewed, including shows by artists Tucker Nichols, Rachel Owens, Rachel Rossin, Christoph Ruckäberle, Allison Schulnik, Lauren Silva, Paul Anthony Smith, and Mike Womack. From 2014 to 2016, the gallery conducted business as Zieher Smith & Horton during a temporary collaboration with Horton Gallery. The gallery was among the first to show several notable artists including Eddie Martinez, Corin Sworn, and Wes Lang.
