= Rachel Walker =

Rachel Walker may refer to:

- Rachel Walker (singer) (born 1976), English-born singer of Gaelic folk music
- Rachel Walker (field hockey) (born 1979), English field hockey international
- Rachel Walker Turner (1868–1943), American soprano singer
- Rachel Walker, who appeared on Operation Transformation in 2011

== See also ==
- Rachel v. Walker, a "freedom suit" filed by Rachel, an African-American slave in the St. Louis Circuit Court.
