= Maryanne Garry =

New Zealand educational psychology academic

Maryanne Connell-Covello Garry
- Education: University of Connecticut
- Scientific career
- Fields: Educational psychology
- Thesis: Susceptibility to memory distortions as a function of skill (1993)

Maryanne Connell-Covello Garry is a New Zealand educational psychology academic. As of mid-2018, she is a full professor at the University of Waikato. Garry is a Fellow of the Association for Psychological Science.

== Academic career ==
After a PhD titled 'Susceptibility to memory distortions as a function of skill' at the University of Connecticut, she worked at Victoria University of Wellington then moved to the University of Waikato, rising to full professor.

Garry's work involves using 'rigorous experimental methods' to investigate memories, some of which has been widely reported on

== Awards and honours ==
Garry is a fellow or the Association for Psychological Science, an honour granted for "sustained outstanding contributions to the science of psychology in the areas of research, teaching, service and/or application".

== Selected works ==
- Garry, Maryanne, Charles G. Manning, Elizabeth F. Loftus, and Steven J. Sherman. "Imagination inflation: Imagining a childhood event inflates confidence that it occurred." Psychonomic Bulletin & Review 3, no. 2 (1996): 208–214.
- Wade, Kimberley A., Maryanne Garry, J. Don Read, and D. Stephen Lindsay. "A picture is worth a thousand lies: Using false photographs to create false childhood memories." Psychonomic Bulletin & Review 9, no. 3 (2002): 597–603.
- Lindsay, D. Stephen, Lisa Hagen, J. Don Read, Kimberley A. Wade, and Maryanne Garry. "True photographs and false memories." Psychological Science 15, no. 3 (2004): 149–154.
- Loftus, Elizabeth F., Maryanne Garry, and Julie Feldman. "Forgetting sexual trauma: What does it mean when 38% forget?." (1994): 1177.
- Garry, Maryanne, and Devon LL Polaschek. "Imagination and memory." Current Directions in Psychological Science 9, no. 1 (2000): 6–10.
- Garry, Maryanne, Lorraine Hope, Rachel Zajac, Ayesha J. Verrall and Jamie M. Robertson. "Contact tracing: A memory task with consequences for Public Health." Perspectives on Psychological Science 16, no. 1 (10 December 2020): 175–187.
