= Noor Eckhoff =

Norwegian footballer (born 1999)

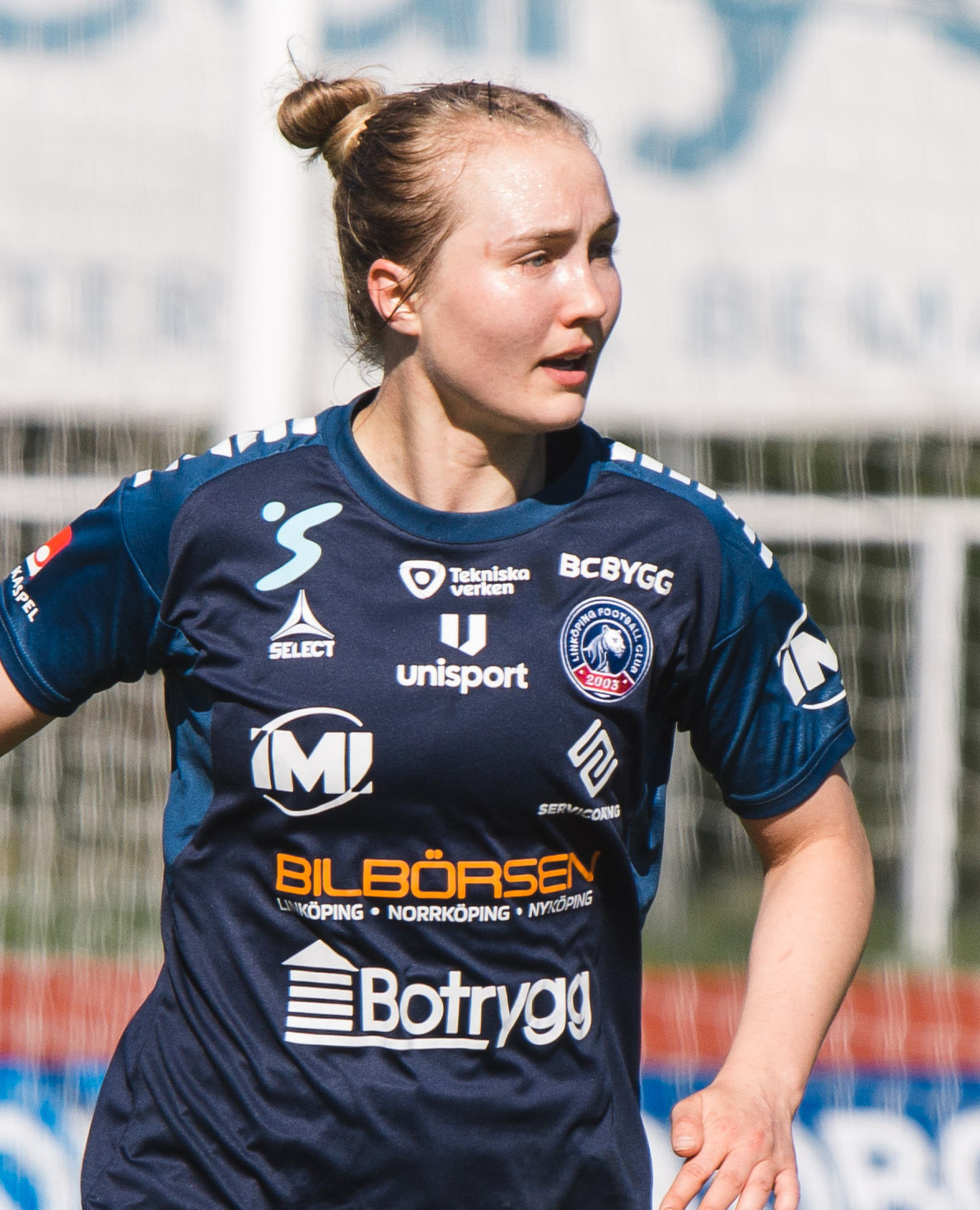
- Eckhoff with Linköpings FC in 2025

Personal information
- Full name: Noor Hoelsbrekken Eckhoff
- Date of birth: 6 December 1999 (age 26)
- Place of birth: Norway
- Height: 1.75 m (5 ft 9 in)
- Position: Midfielder

Team information
- Current team: Vålerenga
- Number: 6

Youth career
- 2007–2011: Koll
- 2011–2018: Lyn

Senior career*
Years	Team	Apps	(Gls)
2018–2019	Lyn	43	(1)
2020	Kolbotn	15	(0)
2021	Melbourne City	7	(0)
2021–2022	Eskilstuna United	46	(6)
2023	Inter Milan	11	(0)
2024–2025	Linköpings FC	50	(0)
2026–	Vålerenga	11	(1)

International career^{‡}
2014	Norway U15	2	(0)
2015	Norway U16	12	(1)
2016	Norway U17	8	(1)
2016–2018	Norway U19	21	(3)
2019–2022	Norway U23	18	(1)
- * Club domestic league appearances and goals as of 14 June 2026 ‡ National team caps and goals as of 20 September 2023

Noor Hoelsbrekken Eckhoff (born 6 December 1999) is a Norwegian professional footballer, who plays as a midfielder for Toppserien club Vålerenga. She has previously played for Norwegian clubs Lyn and Kolbotn in the Toppserien, Australian club Melbourne City in the A-League Women, Swedish clubs Eskilstuna United and Linköpings FC in the Damallsvenskan, and Italian club Inter Milan in the Serie A.

== Club career ==
Eckhoff started playing football because everyone around her were playing, and began by training with Koll IL. She was not particularly good, but thought it was fun to compete, feeling that what she lacked in talent she made up for by training more. She started playing with Koll at the age of 7 and at age 11, switched to Lyn.

After many years in Lyn, Eckhoff signed for Kolbotn in January 2020. After one season in Kolbotn, it was announced in January 2021 that she had signed for Melbourne City in the A-League Women.

When the season in Australia was over, she signed a two-year contract with Swedish club Eskilstuna United in April 2021. In December 2022, the contract with Eskilstuna United was terminated after the club was forcibly relegated due to financial imbalance.

On 18 March 2023, Eckhoff joined Italian club Inter Milan, signing a contract until the end of the season, with an option for another year. On 15 December of the same year, she terminated her deal with the club by mutual consent.

In January 2024, Eckhoff joined Swedish club Linköping FC on a long-term contract until 2026.

Following the expiration of her contract with Linköping FC, Eckhoff signed a contract with Norwegian club Vålerenga lasting until the summer of 2028.

== International career ==
Eckhoff represented Norway at international youth level, playing for the under-15, under-16, under-17, under-19, and under-23 teams.

In June 2018, Eckhoff was called-up to the Norway's under-19 squad for the 2018 UEFA Women's Under-19 Championship.

In August 2022, Eckhoff was selected for the first time on the Norwegian senior national team, as part of Hege Riise's first team squad.

== Style of play ==
Eckhoff is a midfielder with a defensive balance and a willingness to take responsibility. She also has a physical side helping her win duels.

== Personal life ==
Eckhoff is also a cartoonist and has released a Norwegian comics album about her football career; Blør for drakta (Bleeds for the jersey). Her skill became well known and in an interview with Swedish newspaper Östgöta Correspondenten, she took part in a short drawing challenge and agreed to draw the newspaper's front page if her club, Linköping FC, win the championship.

== Bibliography ==
Norvegian publication
Year	Original title	Publisher	Genre
2023	Blør for drakta	Strand forlag (ISBN 9788284420448)	graphic novel
2025	Over streken	Strand forlag (ISBN 9788249530380)	graphic novel
