= Raquel =

Raquel or Racquel is a variation of the given name Rachel. Notable people with the name include:

== Raquel ==
- Raquel (wrestler), Brazilian professional wrestler
- Raquel Alessi (born 1983), American former actress and model
- Raquel Naa Ayorkor Ammah (born 1987), Ghanaian singer, composer and actress
- Raquel Atawo (born 1982), American tennis player
- Raquel Barros (1919–2014), Chilean folklorist
- Raquel Bitton, French singer, actress and playwright
- Raquel Bollo (born 1975), Spanish television personality business woman and model
- Raquel Cabezón, Spanish football midfielder
- Raquel Calderón (born 1991), Chilean actress, singer and lawyer
- Raquel Camaña (1883–1915), Argentine teacher and activist
- Raquel Carriedo-Tomás (born 1971), Spanish singer
- Raquel Cassidy (born 1968), English actress
- Raquel Cepeda, American journalist
- Raquel Chalfi, Israeli poet
- Raquel Dodge (born 1961), Brazilian politician
- Raquel Diaz, Mexican-American professional wrestler, manager, model, and singer
- Raquel Fernandes, Brazilian footballer, born 1991
- Raquel Freire (born 1973), Portuguese film director
- Raquel Garza (born 1967), Mexican actress and comedian
- Raquel González (athlete) (born 1989), Spanish athlete
- Raquel Guerra (born 1985), Portuguese singer and actress
- Raquel Gutiérrez, Mexican militant intellectual
- Raquel Justice (born 2004), American actress and daughter of David Justice
- Raquel Kochhann (born 1992), Brazilian rugby sevens player
- Raquel Lee (born 1986), American actress
- Raquel Liberman (1900–1935), Polish-Jewish immigrant to Argentina
- Raquel del Rosario Macías (born 1982), Spanish singer
- Raquel Morell (born 1959), Mexican actress
- Raquel Olea (born 1944), Chilean writer, professor
- Raquel Olmedo, Mexican actress and singer
- Raquel Pa'aluhi (born 1990), American mixed martial artist
- Raquel Paiewonsky (born 1969), artist from the Dominican Republic
- Raquel Pankowsky (1952–2022), Mexican film and television actress
- Raquel Pélissier (born 1991), Haitian model
- Raquel Pennington (born 1988), American mixed martial artist
- Raquel Pierotti (born 1952), Uruguayan mezzo-soprano opera singer
- Raquel Martínez Rabanal (born 1979), Spanish journalist
- Raquel Rolnik (born 1956), Brazilian architect and urban planner
- Raquel Sánchez Silva (born 1973), Spanish television journalist
- Raquel Silva (born 1978), Brazilian volleyball player
- Raquel Sofía, Puerto Rican singer-songwriter
- Raquel de Souza Noronha, Brazilian footballer, born 1978
- Raquel Tavares (born 1985), Portuguese singer
- Raquel Vizcaíno (born 1967), Spanish handball player
- Raquel Welch (1940–2023), American actress (born Jo Raquel Tejada)
- Raquel Willis, African American writer, editor, and transgender rights activist
- Raquel Yánez (born 1986), Venezuelan actress and model
- Raquel Zelaya (born 1945), Guatemalan economist and politician
- Raquel Zimmermann (born 1983), Brazilian model

== Racquel ==
- Racquel Darrian (born 1968), birth name Kelly Jackson, American former pornographic actress
- Racquel Nugent (born 1968), Australian athlete with disability
- Racquel Sheath (born 1994), New Zealand track cyclist

== Fictional characters ==
- Raquel Alucard, a minor character in the BlazBlue video game series
- Raquel Turner, in the British sitcom Only Fools and Horses
- Raquel Fein, in the Amazon series Transparent
- Raquel "Rocky" Blue, a main character in Shake It Up
- Raquel Wolstenhulme, in the British soap Coronation Street
- Raquel D'Coasta, in the Indian film Vikrant Rona
- Raquel "Raq" Thomas, in the STARZ's Power spin off Raising Kanan

== See also ==
- Rakel, a given name
