= Timothy Taylor (gallery) =

Coordinates: 51.5105°N 0.1497°W

- Type: Art gallery, Mayfair, London
- Director: Timothy Taylor
- Website: www.timothytaylor.com

Timothy Taylor is an international gallery with locations in London, and New York. Founded in Mayfair, London, in 1996, the gallery has worked with post-war and contemporary artists as well as artist estates.

== History ==
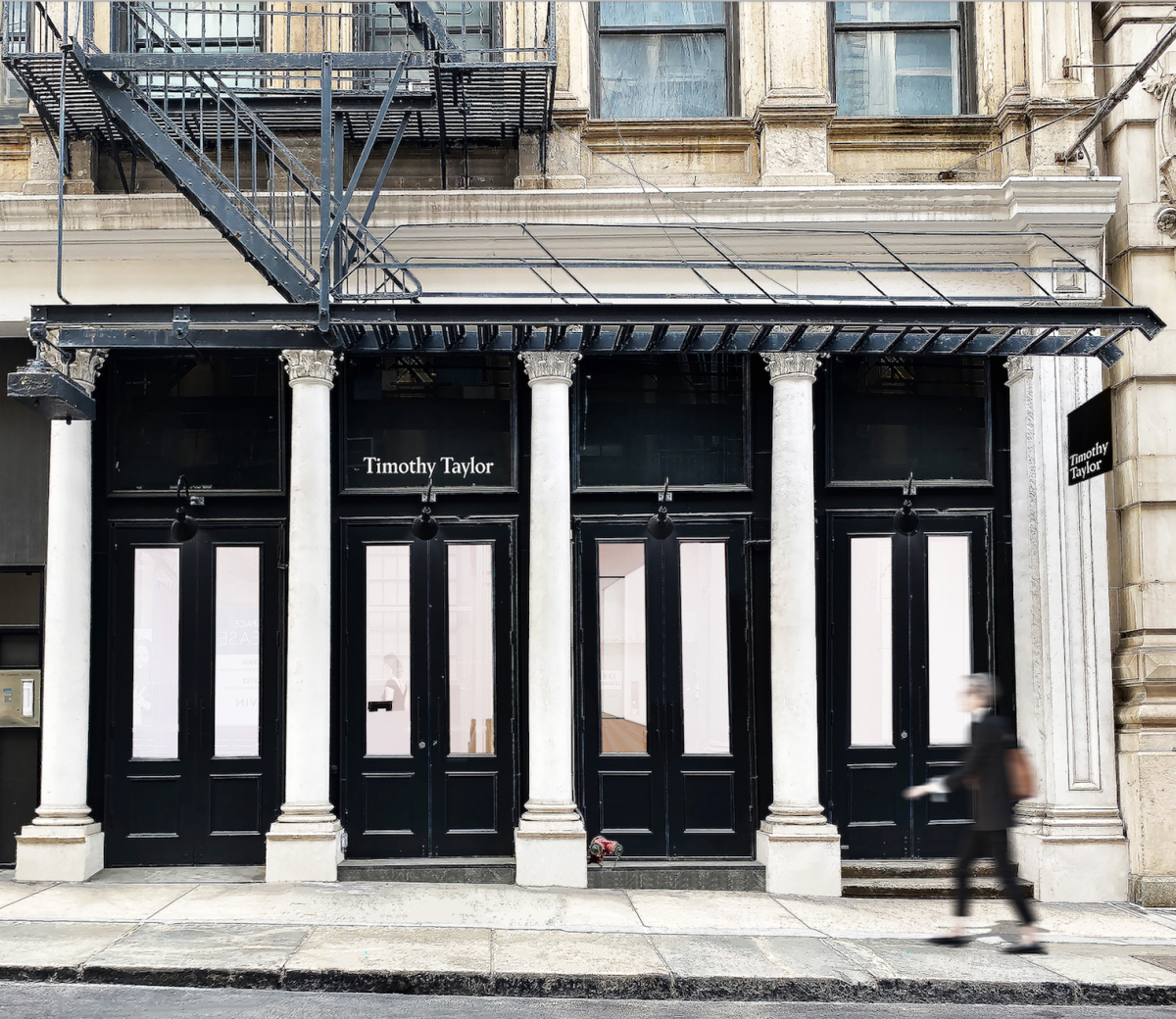
Street view of Timothy Taylor gallery in Tribeca, New York

Timothy Taylor is active in both the primary and secondary markets. The gallery currently represents an intergenerational roster of more than twenty artists and estates from across Europe, Asia, and the Americas, including Alex Katz, Kiki Smith, Antoni Tàpies, and Eddie Martinez. The gallery is known for championing painters whose work is characterized by bold color, distinctive surface treatment, and engagement with the art-historical tradition. Examples include the abstraction of Jonathan Lasker and Chris Martin, to the Symbolist-inflected figuration of Honor Titus and the interiors of Hilary Pecis. Many of these contemporary artists had their London debuts at the gallery. In addition, Timothy Taylor regularly presents historical exhibitions of post-war artists, including Philip Guston, Jean Dubuffet, Agnes Martin, and John Chamberlain.

The gallery's London headquarters is located in a five-story Georgian townhouse at 15 Bolton Street in Mayfair. The gallery expanded internationally in 2016 with the opening of its first New York location on the ground floor of a Chelsea townhouse. In 2023, it opened a 6,000-square-foot flagship space at 74 Leonard Street in Tribeca, renovated by the architectural firm StudioMDA. Alongside its permanent locations, the gallery has a presence in Asia through art fairs, institutional placements, and pop-up exhibitions, such as the first major exhibitions of Sean Scully, Alex Katz, Eddie Martinez, and Antoni Tàpies in mainland China. In addition to regular program, the gallery publishes a range of exhibition catalogues and monographs, with new texts commissioned by leading curators and critics.

== Artists ==
Timothy Taylor Gallery represents numerous living artists, including:

- Gabriel de la Mora (since 2015)
- Alex Katz
- Kiki Smith
- Hilary Pecis
- Marina Adams

In addition, the gallery manages various artist estates, including:

- Antoni Tàpies
- Victor Willing

In the past, the gallery has worked with the following artists and estates:

- Simon Hantaï
- John Chamberlain
- Philip Guston
