= Rashkin (surname) =

Rashkin is a Slavic language-influenced Jewish surname of matronymic derivation. It literally means "Rashke's", where "Rashke" is a Yiddish diminutive form of "Rachel". The Germanic/Yiddish form of the similar derivation is Rashkes.

Notable people with this surname include:

- Valery Rashkin, Russian politician

== See also ==
- Rokhlin
- Raskin
- Rashkind
