= Maren Tellenbröker =

German footballer (born 2000)

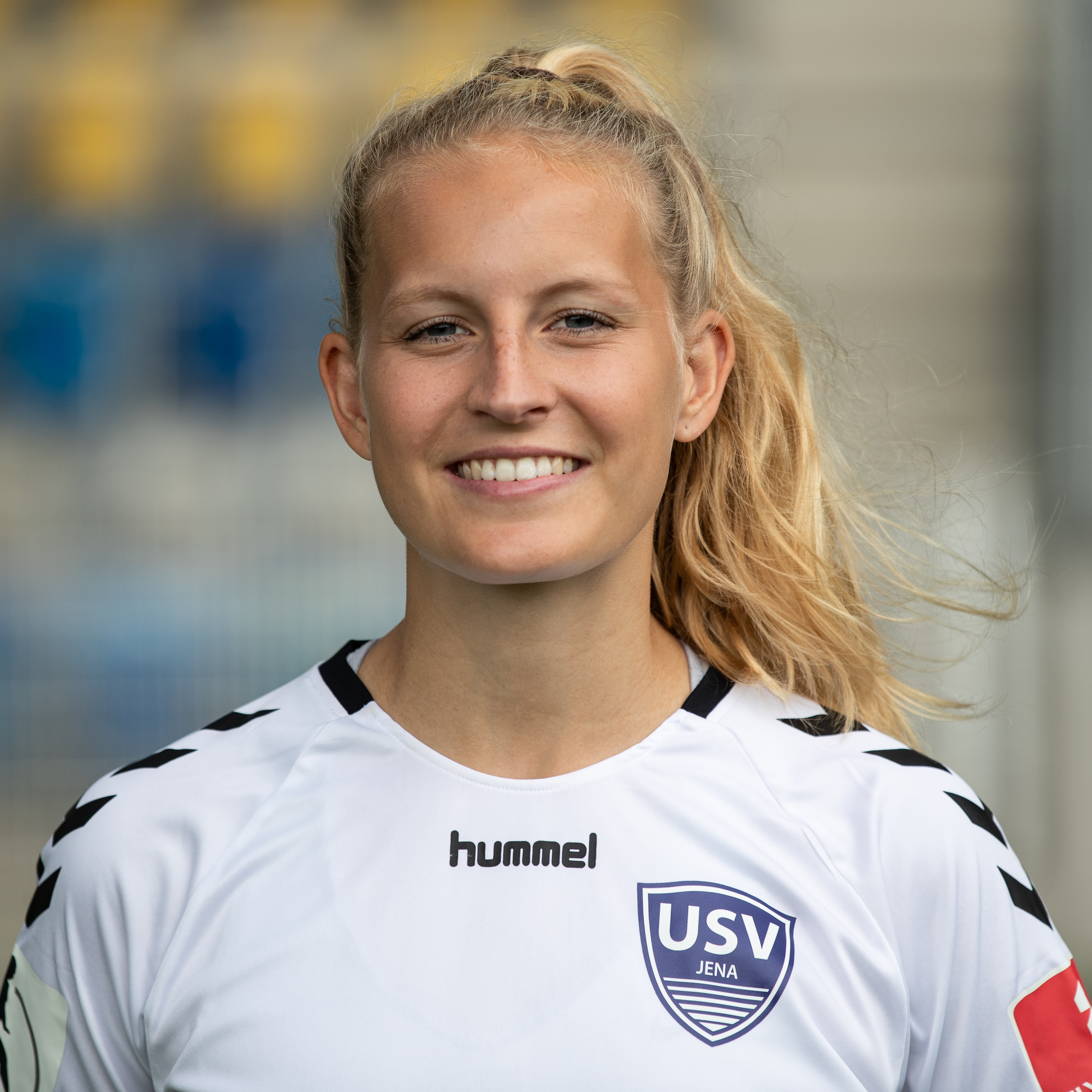

Personal information
- Full name: Maren Marie Tellenbröker
- Date of birth: 15 October 2000 (age 26)
- Place of birth: Bielefeld, North Rhine-Westphalia, Germany
- Position: Midfielder

Maren Marie Tellenbröker (born 15 October 2000) is a German footballer who plays as a midfielder for FSV Gütersloh 2009.
