= Lily Stockman =

American painter (born 1982)

- Born: 1982 (age 43–44); Providence, Rhode Island, US
- Education: Harvard University (BA, Visual and Environmental Studies, 2006), New York University (MFA, Studio Art, 2014)
- Website: lilystockman.com

Lily Stockman (born 1982) is an American painter who lives and works in Los Angeles and Pioneertown, CA.

== Early life and education ==
Lily Stockman studied Visual and Environmental Studies at Harvard University, during which time she spent five months in Ulaanbaatar, Mongolia apprenticing in Buddhist thangka painting at the Union of Mongolian Artists. In 2011, Stockman moved to Jaipur, India to study pigment and Mughal miniature painting. Her time in India culminated with an exhibition at the Threshold Art Gallery in Delhi. Stockman taught undergraduate painting for two years and received her MFA in studio art from New York University, where she studied with painter Maureen Gallace.

== Work ==
Lily Stockman is a contemporary artist known for her unique painting practice, characterized by a vibrant and abstract approach to landscape and color. Stockman's work often involves large-scale canvases that feature bold, expressive brushstrokes and a vivid palette. In addition to her exploration of color, Stockman's paintings often evoke a sense of place and a connection to the natural world, even as they move towards abstraction. She is known for her ability to capture the essence of landscapes and environments while allowing for interpretation and personal reflection.

Stockman's work has been exhibited at Gagosian Gallery in Athens, Greece, Charles Moffett and Cheim & Read in New York, Almine Rech and Timothy Taylor in London, Massimo de Carlo in London, Milan, Paris, and Hong Kong, Jessica Silverman and Berggruen Gallery in San Francisco, Night Gallery, Regen Projects, and the Underground Museum in Los Angeles.

The New Yorker writes, "Stockman’s compositions are both diagrammatic and vaporous, a combination that calls to mind the spiritualist abstractions of the American modernist Agnes Pelton. Although they’re more lyrical, Stockman’s nested shapes also have some of the meticulous magic of Josef Albers’s squares."

Her work has also been reviewed in The New York Times, The Brooklyn Rail, Interview, The Paris Review, New York, Los Angeles Times and Artnet among other publications.

Stockman's work is in the permanent collection of the Smithsonian's Hirshhorn Museum and Sculpture Garden in Washington, D.C., Institute of Contemporary Art (Miami), the Palm Springs Art Museum, the Farnsworth Art Museum in Rockland, ME, the Phoenix Art Museum, and the Orange County Museum of Art in Costa Mesa, CA where she was included in the 2022 California Biennial.

== Selected exhibitions ==
- 2026: A Grass Roof, Solo Exhibition, Massimo de Carlo, Hong Kong
- 2025: Book of Hours, Solo Exhibition, Charles Moffett, New York
- 2024: Minotaur, Solo Exhibition, Fondation Le Corbusier, Paris
- 2023: Nostos, Two-Person Exhibition, Gagosia, Athens, Greece
- 2023: The Glover Group: A Los Angeles Story, Group Exhibition, Massimo de Carlo, Milan
- 2023: Mythopoetics: Symbols and Stories, Group Exhibition, Palm Springs Art Museum, Palm Springs
- 2023: The Waves, Solo Exhibition, Massimo de Carlo, London
- 2022: Tilting Chair, Solo Exhibition, Charles Moffett, New York
- 2022: A Green Place, Solo Exhibition, Almine Rech, London
- 2022: Shrubs, Group Exhibition, Night Gallery, Los Angeles
- 2021: Better Weather: Lois Dodd, Kieran Brenton Hinton, Lily Stockman, Group Exhibition, TOA Presents, Minneapolis
- 2021: Summer Show, Group Exhibition, Almine Rech, Aspen
- 2021: Platform, Group Exhibition, Platform / David Zwirner, New York
- 2020: LA Views, Group Exhibition, Maki Gallery, Tokyo
- 2020: Seed, Stone, Mirror, Match, Solo Exhibition, Charles Moffett, New York
- 2020: Conversational Spirits, Group Exhibition, Jessica Silverman, San Francisco
- 2020: Dwelling is the Light, Group Exhibition, curated by Katy Hessel, Timothy Taylor, London
- 2019: By Women, For Tomorrow’s Women, Group Exhibition, curated by Agnes Gund and Oprah Winfrey, Sotheby's, New York
- 2018: Loquats, Solo Exhibition, Charles Moffett, New York
- 2018: All Over the Moon, Group Exhibition, Cheim & Read, New York
- 2018: My Kid Can Do That, Group Exhibition, curated by Kyle DeWoody, The Underground Museum, Los Angeles
- 2017: Tomorrow's Man, curated by Jack Pierson, Regen Projects, Los Angeles
- 2016: Pollinator, Solo Exhibition, Gavlak, Los Angeles
- 2015: E.1027, Group Exhibition, Joe Sheftel Gallery, New York
- 2015: Plainly to Propound, Group Exhibition, Gavlak, Los Angeles
- 2014: Women, Solo Exhibition, Luis De Jesus, Los Angeles
- 2013: ULTRAVIOLET: 1913–2013, Solo Exhibition, 80WSE Gallery, New York

== Permanent collections ==
- Hirshhorn Museum and Sculpture Garden, Washington, D.C.
- Museum of Contemporary Art, Los Angeles, Los Angeles, CA
- Institute of Contemporary Art (Miami), Miami, FL
- Pennsylvania Academy of Fine Arts, Philadelphia, PA
- Palm Springs Art Museum, Palm Springs, CA
- Peabody Essex Museum, Salem, MA
- Farnsworth Art Museum, Rockland, ME,
- Phoenix Art Museum, Phoenix, AZ
- Orange County Museum of Art, Costa Mesa, CA

== Awards ==
- 2013 Derek Bok Teaching Award, Harvard University, Cambridge, MA
- 2013 Samuel Eshborn Award, New York, NY
- 2012 Martin Wong Foundation Scholarship, New York, NY
- 2011 US-India Educational Foundation Artist's Grant, New Delhi, India
- 2011 Winterline Centre for the Arts Exhibition Grant, Mussoorie, Uttarakhand, India
- 2006 National Geographic Expeditions Council Youth Grant to Mongolia

== Essays & Writing ==
Stockman's essays have been featured in Vogue Magazine, Monocle (UK magazine), and the Iceland Review. In 2019, Charles Moffett Gallery published Stockman's first monograph, Imaginary Gardens with foreword by artist and Paper Monument founder Roger White.
