= Tschop =

Tschop may refer to:

- Chop, Ukraine
- Matija Čop (1797–1835), Slovenian linguist
- Matthias Tschöp, (born 1967), German physician

== See also ==
- Tschopp, a surname
