= Rachel Rossin =

New York installation artist

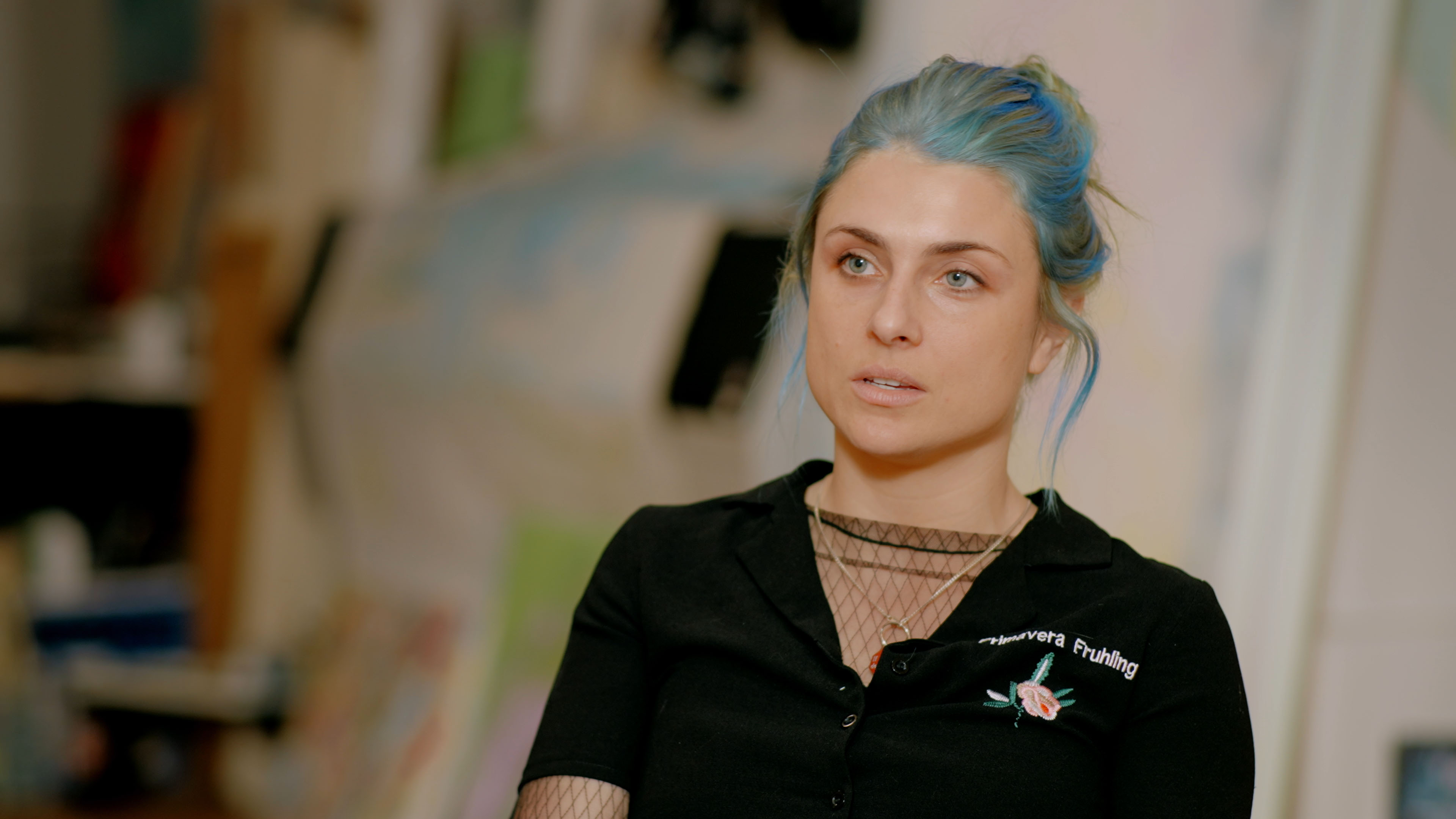
- Born: 1987 (age 38–39); West Palm Beach, Florida

Rachel Rossin (born 1987, West Palm Beach, Florida) is a multi-media and installation artist based in New York City. Whitney Museum of American Art describes Rossin as "a painter and programmer whose multi-disciplinary practice has established her as a pioneer in the field of virtual reality. Her work blends painting, sculpture, new media, gaming, and video to create digital landscapes that focus on entropy, embodiment, the ubiquity of technology and its effect on our psychology."

== Personal life ==
When Rossin was 16, her mother brought her to the Whitney Museum of American Art where she was attracted to Kiki Smith’s wax figures. Rossin expressed that the gallery exhibition had a profound impact on her career, saying “I hated them and I loved them because they were both repulsive and tender. These feelings kept competing and rolling over each other for the front of my mind."

== Career ==
=== Solo Work ===
In 2025, Rossin presented The Totalists, a solo exhibition of paintings informed by "custom AI software employing her own artistic oeuvre as its dataset." The works centered on the concept of the “black box” as a lens for exploring the relationship between contemporary human experience and the hidden technological infrastructures that shape it.

In 2024, Rossin presented Haha Real, a site-specific installation made for Buffalo Bayou Park Cistern, a former underground reservoir. The work was inspired by Rossin's favorite childhood novel, The Velveteen Rabbit, and was set across the vast scale of the space using "technical production, where spotlights comb the cistern’s vast architecture in conversation with 8-channel video."

In 2023, Magenta Plains exhibited Scry, a solo presentation of trans-media paintings and larger scale installation.

In 2022, the KW Institute of Contemporary Art and the Whitney Museum of American Art co-commissioned THE MAW OF, “a transmedia story—a narrative unfolding across multiple platforms and formats—that reflects on the ways in which our bodies and minds are increasingly merging with and altered by technology.” The exhibition was first presented at KW Institute of Contemporary Art in Berlin in 2022, before traveling in 2023 to the Whitney Museum of American Art in New York, and then to the Emerson Contemporary Museum of Art, in Boston, MA.

In 2021, Magenta Plains presented Rossin's work, Boohoo Stamina, which showcased recent multimedia paintings. Dawn Chan reviewed Boohoo Stamina for the New York Times, writing "Rossin’s take is strangely compelling. At times, her compositions evoke the visionary, spray-painted works of the Romanian-American artist Hedda Sterne, to terrific effect. At other times, Rossin somehow gets her brush marks to replicate the pixelated feel of virtual-reality worlds."

In 2017, she debuted a piece The Sky is a Gap, where she mapped a room-scale virtual reality installation to move 3D time and explosions by the user's movements.

From December 9, 2016 to January 15, 2017, the exhibition, My Little Green Leaf was held in partnership with Art in General and kim? Contemporary Art Centre in Riga, Latvia. The installation piece interweaves the viewers interactive experience with virtual reality and physical space.

In 2015, Rossin's exhibition, N=7 / The Wake in Heat of Collapse, located at SIGNAL in New York, New York, was a virtual reality simulation that employs the structure of side-scrolling gameplay to create an immersive, Oculus Rift-based experience. Additionally, in 2015, Rossin held her work, Shelter of a Limping Substrate, at the Elliott Levenglick Gallery. Shelter of a Limping Substrate refers to the underlying layer in 3D imaging. She created formal en plein air paintings, which then were reimagined in virtual reality CAD software.

From October 15—November 14, 2015, Rachel held her work, Lossy, at the ZieherSmith, a contemporary art gallery in New York City. In Rossin's words: “The exhibition posits that our relationship with reality isn't comprised of a separate virtual and real but looks more like a gradient between the two— with most of our modern lives being lived in the action of hopping from screen to screen. Like lossy compression, this process includes entropy as an inherent given— in optimizing what already exists by omitting the excess in worlds with their own internal logic.”

=== Group work ===
In 2024, Rossin was featured in Poetics of Encryption at KW Institute for Contemporary Art, a group presentation that built on concepts addressed in the 2023 book, Poetics of Encryption: Art and the Technocene by Nadim Samman.

In 2023, Rossin was included in Refigured at the Whitney Museum of American Art in New York, which showcased works addressing the intersection of digital and physical materiality.

In 2022, Rossin participated in Signals at Someday Gallery, New York, a group exhibition exploring digital and physical materiality.

In 2018, Rossin collaborated with Cecilia Salama on a store installation for Brazilian shoe company Melissa, with her video piece displayed on large pixelated screens in the store lobby.

In 2017, Rossin took part in After Us at K11 Art Museum in Shanghai, China, presented in collaboration with the New Museum, which examined how Chinese and international artists use surrogates, proxies, and avatars to expand notions of being human. She was also included in ARS17: Hello World! A Survey of Contemporary Art on the Theme of Digital Revolution at Kiasma Museum of Contemporary Art in Helsinki, Finland, which ran from March 31, 2017, to January 14, 2018, presenting international artists engaging with themes of digital transformation. From January 19 to March 3, 2017, Rachel Rossin participated in The Unframed World: Virtual Reality as Artistic Medium for the 21st Century at HeK (House of Electronic Arts Basel) in Basel, Switzerland, a group exhibition exploring artistic approaches to virtual reality. From March 17 to May 31, 2017, she took part in After Us at K11 Art Museum in Shanghai, China, presented in collaboration with the New Museum, which examined how Chinese and international artists use surrogates, proxies, and avatars to expand notions of being human.

== Select Documentary and Video Features ==
- Art21. "Y2Paint: Rachel Rossin," December 19, 2025
- Louisiana Channel. "Rachel Rossin: On the Journey to Self-Creation," September 1, 2023.
- Art21. "Rachel Rossin's Digital Homes," May 5, 2021.
- National Geographic. "Re-Envisioning Reality - Tech+Art, | Genius: Picasso | Rachel Rossin," June 1, 2018.
- Artforum. "Rachel Rossin Talks About Her Life and Work," November 1, 2017.

== Awards and Notable Press Coverage ==
- Forbes Magazine "30 Under 30'"in Art & Style (2017)
- Cultured Magazine "30 under 35'"(2016)
- Fellowship in Virtual Reality at New Museum's Incubator New Inc (2015-2016)
- Kate Spade & Co. Foundation Grant (2015)

== Public Collections ==
- Beth Rudin Dewoody Collection, The Bunker, West Palm Beach, FL
- Borusan Collection, Istanbul, TR
- Guggenheim New York, New York, NY
- Kemper Museum of Art, Kansas City, MO
- Norton Museum of Art, West Palm Beach, FL
- Rhizome and The New Museum, First Look, New York, NY
- Stolbun Collection, Houston, TX
- Whitney Museum of American Art, New York, NY
- Zabludowicz Collection, London, UK
