= Rachel Walker Turner =

American soprano

Rachel Walker Turner (1868–1943), also known as the "Creole Nightingale", was an American soprano.

Walker was born in 1868 in Cleveland, Ohio to parents M.L. (Lenyar) and T.W. Turner. While in Cleveland, she studied music under John Underner, and by 1886, she began performing locally as a soprano singer and pianist. She joined the Midnight Star Concert Company in 1883, touring as a singer with the company. She later joined a concert company as their prima donna soprano and began touring in California.

In 1895, Walker moved to New York for her career. She traveled to London in 1897 and began living abroad until the onset of World War I, eventually returning to the United States in 1915.

Walker died in Cleveland on November 12, 1943.
