= Rachel Nichols =

Rachel Nichols may refer to:

- Rachel Nichols (journalist) (born 1973), American sports broadcaster
- Rachel Nichols (actress) (born 1980), American actress

== See also ==
- Rachel Nicholls, English soprano
- Rachel Nicol (disambiguation)
- Rachel Nickell, English murder victim
