= Rachel White =

Rachel White may refer to

- Rachel White (actress) (born 1978), US-Indian actress
- Rachel White (dancer), professional dancer from Tbilisi
- Rachel White (volleyball) (born 1974), British-born Australian volleyball player
