= Eddie Martinez (artist) =

American visual artist

- Born: 1977 (age 48–49); Groton Naval Base, United States
- Known for: Painting, drawing, sculpture
- Style: Figurative, abstract
- Spouse: Sam Moyer
- Website: Eddie Martinez

Eddie Martinez, When We Were In Good Hands, oil, spray paint, enamel, collaged canvas and silkscreen ink on canvas, 72" x 108", 2016–17.

Eddie Martinez (born 1977) is a New York-based artist best known for large-scale paintings that feature bold color, urgent line and brushwork, and graphic shapes and forms. His style combines painting and drawing, abstraction and representation, and a casual approach to materials with an eclectic iconography of figurative elements. While contemporary in his choice of materials and subjects, he bridges a wide range of historical influences, including CoBrA, Action painting, neo-expressionism and Philip Guston, and classical conventions of portraiture, still life and allegorical narrative, filtered through the lens of daily experience and popular culture.

Martinez has exhibited internationally, including solo museum shows at the Bronx Museum of the Arts, The Drawing Center, Yuz Museum Shanghai, and Museum of Contemporary Art Detroit, and group exhibitions at the Saatchi Gallery in London and Garage Museum of Contemporary Art in Moscow, among others. His work belongs to public institutions including the Bronx Museum, Morgan Library & Museum, Marciano Collection, Saatchi Collection, and Colección Jumex (Mexico City). Martinez is married to artist Sam Moyer, and lives and works in Brooklyn, New York.

== Early life and career ==
Martinez was born in 1977 on the Groton Naval Base in Connecticut. His family moved frequently, particularly after his parents' marriage ended, and he grew up in California, Florida, Texas and Massachusetts. He began creating his own character-based art as an adolescent in San Diego. After moving back to the northeast, he attended the Art Institute of Boston, but found his working style and subject matter more influenced by the urban culture and iconography around him and left after a year.

While in Boston in the early 2000s, he began exhibiting his art and worked as an art handler for the Institute of Contemporary Art, Boston. After a move to Brooklyn in 2004, he began to attract steadily increasing attention through group, solo gallery, and eventually, museum exhibitions. In 2008, he received a Bauernmarkt Residency from the Lenikus Collection in Vienna.

== Work and critical reception ==
Martinez's work shifts between traditional and unconventional modes of abstract and figurative painting and drawing, reinterpreting the past (his own and that of art history) and blurring boundaries to push his practice in new directions. His paintings are described as energetic, visceral and immediate, with bold line, coarse brushwork, and aggressive color and texture achieved through combinations of oil, enamel and spray paint, silkscreening, and collaged elements on canvas. His drawing—key to his work and a significant inspiration for his painting—functions like a spontaneous, daily biographical-journalistic tool; critics describe it as looser and more unrehearsed and speculative than his paintings, comparing its simple style to that of Paul Klee. Martinez prefers a rapid working process, with little pre-thought in order to maintain spontaneity; he likens it to the back-and-forth movement between action and pause, contact and regrouping in boxing. In addition to painting and drawing, Martinez has produced large and small-scale abstract sculpture, made or developed from found objects and cast in bronze, which derive from his painting practice.

Eddie Martinez, The Grass is Never Greener, mixed media on canvas, 72" x 118", 2009.

=== Early work ===
Martinez's first New York solo show at ZieherSmith (2006) presented raw, mixed-media paintings and drawings that critics suggest drew on his immediate environment with an introspective, diaristic focus, creating a dialogue between the external world and the internal syntax of painting. They portray a recurring, whimsical cast of wide-eyed figures in hats, parrots and coiled snakes set in incongruous, sometimes fantastical environments dense with vivid pattern and color, spires, towers and rooftops, road signs and potted plants (e.g., Wild Pilgrims, 2005 or Snakesperience, 2006). Some paintings combine multiple genres (portraiture, still life, allegorical narrative), while others focus on one, as in Mario Situation (2006), which Art In America's David Coggins wrote "reinvigorates the still life … in a spirit of clear-eyed exploration rather than postmodern posturing." Critics have compared the energy and approach of Martinez's early (and later) work to the path between drawing and painting pioneered by Cy Twombly.

In 2010, New York Times critic Roberta Smith characterized Martinez's evolving style as "a kind of updated, liberated Neo-Expressionism" drawing widely from Picasso, early Peter Saul, Arshile Gorky, de Kooning and David Hockney. Others describe its "kitchen-sink quality"—loaded with ideas, gesture and texture, scattered fields, pileups of shapes and cartoony objects, thick brushstrokes, bursts of paint—as functioning like rebuses or hieroglyphs to create not-quite-decipherable messages. In several paintings of this time, Martinez introduced speech bubbles (Back Looker, 2009) or tabletops (The Grass Is Never Greener, 2009), which serve as framing devices for clustered forms or paintings within paintings, and create space within the compositions. Contrasting with the bright cacophony of much of his work, Martinez also explored all-white tableaux with motifs squeezed straight from caulk tubes and all-black canvases with incised images revealing under-layers of coloration (e.g., Bad War). Critics likened some of this work, in its appearance and mix of humor and darkness, to the work of Guston and Basquiat.

In late 2010, Martinez created the 8-by-28-foot installation The Feast (ZieherSmith, Art Basel Miami Beach), a variation on his table paintings that matched expressionistic painting with Renaissance and Baroque historical themes, depicting a raucous banquet table attended by twelve figures; it attracted notice after being purchased by collector Charles Saatchi.

=== Later work ===
In his post-2010 work, Martinez turned toward abstraction. He made a dramatic shift in the solo show "Matador" (Journal Gallery, 2013), paring down his content to a single composition of four interlocking, bulbous shapes in red, blue, yellow and black, repeated on five 7-by-10-foot white canvases, with slight variations in style, arrangement, and texture. The bold color and cartoonish forms recall Miró and Picasso, while the rugged surfaces—viscous oil paint scraped, smudged and attacked with a wide palette knife, housepainter’s brush and disc sander—suggest action painting, complicated by hasty, contemporary bursts of spray paint and banal collaged elements (gum wrappers, baby wipes). The show's title linked the processes of painters and matadors, while its focused variations alluded to the orchestrated repetitions of the bullfight, urban signage and serial art.

Following that show, Martinez took a hiatus from painting and turned to three-dimensional work: modest abstract sculptures of scavenged found objects, initially combined in ramshackle configurations that he painted brightly or in bronze. He translated them into larger, human-scaled pieces using plaster, Styrofoam and wood planks, which were exhibited at Kohn Gallery (2014). That show also featured large gestural, sketchy paintings pared down to airy compositions of colliding, abstract blobby slabs of primary colors (e.g., Perfect Stranger, 2014), that reviews suggest resembled the sculptures.

In his shows "Salmon Eye" (2016) and "Cowboy Town" (2017), Martinez returned with amalgamations of abstraction and figuration emphasizing the immediacy and speed of drawings, which were painted with less textural surface build-up and more white space. They originated as small Sharpie drawings that he enlarged as black silkscreens on canvas, sometimes treating the lines like a blueprint and others times disregarding or obscuring them entirely with oils, enamel, and spray paint. Critics suggested the latter show, which featured forms emerging out of chaos (e.g., When We Were in Good Hands, Cowboy Town) reflected a dystopian response to the contemporary U.S. sociopolitical climate.

Martinez attracted institutional recognition in the latter 2010s, with five museum solo shows in three years. His first, "Ants at a Picknic" at the Davis Museum (2017), presented a new series of large-scale mandala paintings, painted bronze tabletop sculptures and large framed drawings. In the paintings, the mandalas serve as containers for shapes and marks, much like his earlier table works; based on small drawings that he enlarged, they highlight Martinez's command of linework. His immersive, four-wall, salon-style exhibition at The Drawing Center the same year recreated the wall of abstract drawings—done at home and in the world—accruing in his studio over several years. It ultimately comprised roughly two thousand drawings (many swapped in throughout the show), from idle, automatic-drawing doodles to painting studies; some of his paintings were hung over them to highlight the connections between the two mediums.

In his Bronx Museum show, "White Outs" (2018), Martinez reversed course from his typically colorful work by focusing on a process of erasure in which he intentionally blotted out silkscreened drawing forms with varying shades of white. The resulting, large-scale works, characterized by ghostly shapes, occasional bursts of colors and rich textures, suggested a simulated snowstorm (whiteout) while nodding to historical pieces by Robert Ryman, Rauschenberg and Johns. Exhibitions at the Museum of Contemporary Art Detroit ("Fast Eddie") and the Yuz Museum in Shanghai ("Open Feast") in 2019 respectively featured, among other work, new floating "blockhead" paintings reworking an early skull motif and a vibrant 65-foot variation on his table paintings.

Martinez has had three later solo exhibitions at Mitchell-Innes & Nash: "Love Letters" and "Yard Work" (both 2018) and "Homework" (2020). "Love Letters" featured largely abstract paintings based on enlarged images drawn on a small, personalized notepad (the names and address often visible); Identifiable forms arrayed in a loosely associative way occasionally peek out to create a sense of reality described as both playful and discomfiting. "Homework," an online exhibition of small works on cardboard made during the COVID-19 lockdown, continued Martinez's interest in exploring seriality by testing and repeating single compositions and forms.

At the 2024 Biennale Arte, Martinez’s showcased, Nomader, curated by Alison M. Gingeras, at the San Marino Pavilion. The presentation referenced the art movement CoBrA, the artist Philip Guston, and various media like oil and collage, highlighting the theme of, "Foreigners Everywhere."

== Collections ==
Martinez's work is represented in the permanent collections of institutions including the Bronx Museum of the Arts, Modern Art Museum of Fort Worth, Davis Museum at Wellesley College, Marciano Collection, Morgan Library & Museum, Pérez Art Museum Miami, and Rhode Island School of Design Museum in the U.S., the Saatchi Collection and Hiscox Collection in London, and the Colección Jumex (Mexico City). He has also built a recognized base of American, European and Asian private collectors. Two of his paintings were sold at the 2019 International Contemporary Art Fair (FIAC) in Paris for prices ranging up to $150,000; the same year, his 12-foot-wide canvas High Flying Bird (2014) sold at a Christie's auction for US$2 million, while his canvas Empirical Mind State (2009) sold for £615,000 in 2020.

== Exhibitions ==
Martinez's early exhibitions included group shows at the Deste Foundation in Athens, Museum of Contemporary Art of Rome, Museum of Mexico City and Saatchi Gallery, and solo shows at ZieherSmith (2006–10) and Loyal Gallery (Stockholm, 2006–8), among others.

In subsequent years, he has had solo exhibitions at Journal Gallery, Half Gallery and Mitchell-Innes & Nash in New York, Timothy Taylor Gallery (London), Kohn Gallery (Los Angeles) and Perrotin (Hong Kong), and made group appearances at the KUNSTEN Museum of Modern Art and Kunstmuseum Bonn, among others. His first solo museum show took place at the Davis Museum at Wellesley College in 2017, followed by shows at The Drawing Center, Bronx Museum, Museum of Contemporary Art Detroit, and Yuz Museum. Martinez is represented by Timothy Taylor (in London), Mitchell-Innes & Nash (New York) and Perrotin. Previously, he was represented by Blum & Poe (Los Angeles).
