= Raskin =

Raskin (and the feminine variant Raskina) is a surname of Yiddish origin, a matronymic from "Raske", nickname for Rachel. Notable people with this name include:

== In arts, literature and entertainment ==
- Allison Raskin (born 1989), American writer and content creator
- Ellen Raskin (1928–1984), American author (The Westing Game), illustrator, and designer
- Eugene Raskin or Gene Raskin (c.1910–2004), American musician and playwright
- Fred Raskin (born 1972), American film editor
- Jenny Raskin (born 1969), American television producer and filmmaker
- Jessica Raskin (born 1982), American actress
- Jonah Raskin (born 1942), American writer
- Jozef Raskin (1892–1943), Belgian painter and missionary
- Judith Raskin (1928–1984), American soprano
- Lisi Raskin (born 1974), American artist
- Mario Raskin (born 1952), Argentine harpsichordist
- Maurice Raskin (1906–1984), Belgian violinist
- Milt Raskin (1916–1977), American pianist
- Natasha Raskin Sharp (born 1986), Scottish antiques expert and television presenter
- Philip Raskin (born 1947), Scottish landscape painter
- Philip Max Raskin (1880–1944), Jewish/English/American poet
- Robin Raskin (born 1954), American writer
- Saul Raskin (1878–1966), American artist and writer

== In government and politics ==
- Eleanor Raskin (born 1946), former member of the Marxist Weather Underground organization
- Jamie Raskin (born 1962), American politician
- Marcus Raskin (1934–2017), American progressive activist and social critic
- Max Raskin (1902–1984), American politician and judge
- Sarah Bloom Raskin (born 1961), American jurist
- Wouter Raskin (born 1972), Belgian-Flemish politician

== In religion ==
- Aaron Raskin, Chabad rabbi in Brooklyn, New York
- Arie Zeev Raskin (born 1976), Chief Rabbi of Cyprus
- Dovid Raskin (1927–2011), Chabad Hasidic rabbi

== In sport ==
- Dmytro Raskin (born 1995), Ukrainian judoka
- Guillaume Raskin (1937–2016), Belgian footballer
- Nicolas Raskin (born 2001), Belgian footballer
- Tubby Raskin (1902–1981), American basketball player and coach
- Yulia Raskina (born 1982), Belarusian rhythmic gymnast

== In other fields ==
- A. H. Raskin (1911–1993), Canadian-American labor reporter
- Aza Raskin (born 1984), son of Jef Raskin and president of Humanized, makers of Enso
- Jef Raskin (1943–2005), interface designer for the Apple Macintosh
- Lutgarde Raskin, Belgian-American scientist
- Paul Raskin (born 1942), future scenario analysis and sustainability expert
- Victor Raskin (born 1944), Russian-born American linguist

== See also ==
- Rashkin (surname)
