= Rachel Pavlou =

British women's football advocate

Rachel Pavlou is the Women's Development Manager for EDI, History and Heritage at the Football Association (FA) in England and the Crown Dependencies of Jersey, Guernsey and the Isle of Man. She has helped the development of women's football at the FA since 1998.

Pavlou helped the implementation of the FA Women's Super League and has managed both the FA participation and talent development programmes. She is a panel member of the Hall of Fame for both the FA Women's Super League and the National Football Museum.

Pavlou is a trustee of the Aston Villa FC Foundation, and she is a FIFA Women's Football development expert.

Pavlou played football at primary school alongside boys and was chosen for football trials as a seven-year old. She was subsequently brought into school with her parents and told by her headteacher that "over his dead body" would she ever play football in a boys' team and that she should instead play "girls' sports". She has since described the altercation as a "completely and utterly defining moment".
