= Rakels =

Rakels is a surname. Notable people with the surname include:

- Deniss Rakels (born 1992), Latvian footballer
- Heidi Rakels (born 1968), Belgian judoka
