= Rachel Joyce =

Rachel Joyce may refer to:

- Rachel Joyce (triathlete) (born 1978), English triathlete
- Rachel Joyce (writer) (born 1962), British writer
