= Rachel Thomas =

Rachel Thomas may refer to:

- Rachel Thomas (actress) (1905–1995), Welsh character actress
- Rachel Thomas (skydiver) (born 1955), first Indian woman to skydive over the North Pole
- Rachel Thomas (academic) (born 1983), American computer scientist

== See also ==
- Rachael Thomas (born 1986), Canadian politician
