= Rachel Burke =

American politician

Member of New Hampshire House of Representatives for Strafford 2
- In office 2012–2014

Member of New Hampshire House of Representatives for Strafford 3
- In office 2006–2010

Personal details
- Party: Republican

Rachel B. Burke is an American politician. She represented Strafford County on the New Hampshire House of Representatives from 2006 to 2010, and from 2012 to 2014.
