= Maureen Gallace =

American painter based in New York City (born 1960)

- Born: 1960 (age 65–66); Stamford, Connecticut, United States
- Education: Rutgers University (MFA), The Hartford Art School (BFA)
- Known for: Painter
- Website: maureengallace.com

Maureen Gallace (born 1960) is an American painter based in New York City. She has exhibited extensively internationally, including solo exhibitions at MoMA PS1, La Conservera, Spain, the Art Institute of Chicago, and Dallas Museum of Art. Gallace's work was included in the 2010 Whitney Biennial.

== Early life and education ==
Gallace was born in Stamford, Connecticut in 1960. She received her BFA from The Hartford Art School, University of Hartford in 1981 and her MFA from Rutgers University in 1983.

== Career ==
Gallace paints intimately sized landscapes of houses and beaches devoid of people. She has been inspired by the rural New England landscape. Her process involves careful observation, omission, attention to brushstroke, color, and composition. Gallace describes the process of arriving at her streamlined representations as staring at something and breaking it down to what she finds most important. In a review of her show at 303 Gallery in New York in 2015, Peter Schjeldahl surmised that her aim is "description, not of how things look but of how they seem."

In Gallace's oil painting Cape Cod, Early September (2008) there is a simplified white cottage in the center surrounded by a pale blue sky and bright greenery. This painting was a part of the 2010 Whitney Biennial. She creates paintings with visible brushstrokes by painting wet on wet layers of oil on panel. Her technique flattens the perspective in the picture. She excludes details on the cottage, which allows viewers to make their own associations with the image. Gallace's work relates to early American Modernist painting, especially Edward Hopper's representations of small towns and Milton Avery's abstracted seascapes. Schjeldahl also suggests it has kinship with the still lifes of the mid-20th-century Italian painter Giorgio Morandi.

Bruce Hainley selected Beach No. 2 (2013) as the "Best of 2013" in the December 2013 issue of Artforum. He wrote:

Gallace ... makes some of the most intense paintings going. Luminous grays, glissandos of white, and auroral pinks and oranges dramatize her precise blues. In her “seascapes,” ... waves crash upon the shore and the horizons disappear—which is not a minor event for a painter who always considers grounding. While the artist’s photographs (one was reproduced as the show’s announcement card) document specific locales and buildings, some already dismantled by environmental or economic havoc, the paintings transmigrate soulfulness more than they do any topography. Gallace dissolves ongoing nattering about abstraction and representation, achieving the rare, staunch beauty of the quietly hard-won.

== Exhibitions ==
- 2024: Misako & Rosen, Tokyo, Japan
- 2024: Gladstone Gallery, New York, NY
- 2019: Gladstone Gallery, New York, NY
- 2017: MoMA PS1, Queens, NY
- 2013: Overduin and Kite, Los Angeles
- 2011: La Conservera, Ceuti, Murcia, Spain
- 2009: Michael Kohn Gallery, Los Angeles, CA
- 2007: Sprüth Magers, Munich, Germany
- 2007: Paradise Project, Douglas Hyde Gallery, Dublin, Ireland
- 2006: Art Institute of Chicago, Curated by James Rondeau, Chicago, IL
- 2006: 303 Gallery, New York, NY
- 2005: Kerlin Gallery, Dublin, Ireland
- 2004: Douglas Hyde Gallery, Trinity College, Dublin, Ireland
- 2003: Dallas Museum of Art, Curated by Suzanne Weaver, Dallas, TX
- 2003: Maureen Paley Interim Art, London, Great Britain
- 2002: Gallery Side2, Tokyo, Japan
- 2001: Galleria Il Capricorno, Venice, Italy
- 2001: Kerlin Gallery, Dublin, Ireland
- 2001: Fukui City Art Museum, Fukui-shi, Japan
- 1999: Texas Gallery, Houston, TX
- 1997: Johnen & Schottle, Cologne, Germany
- 1996: Museum Schloss-Hardenberg, Velbert, Germany. Catalog
- 1996: Galerie Christian Drantmann, Brussels, Belgium
- 1996: Modulo Gallery, Lisbon, Portugal
- 1995: Kohn Turner Gallery, Los Angeles, CA
- 1994: Jack Hanley Gallery, San Francisco, CA
- 1993: Nicole Klagsbrun Gallery, New York, NY
- 1993: Nielsen Gallery, Boston, MA
- 1990: Julian Pretto Gallery, New York, NY
