= Rachel Stevens (sculptor) =

American sculptor

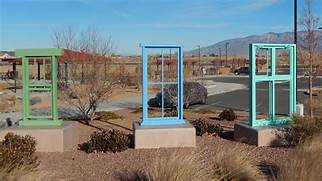
- You are Here displayed at Ventanas Ranch Park, Albuquerque, NM
- Website: Official website

Rachel Stevens is a sculptor, emeritus professor of art at New Mexico State University and a Fulbright Scholar. Stevens has exhibited both in the United States and internationally.

== Exhibitions and installations ==
Stevens's public sculpture, "You are Here", is displayed at Ventanas Ranch Park, in Albuquerque, NM. Her work has been exhibited at the Artists Space, New York, El Paso Museum of Art, Siddhartha Gallery, Kathmandu, Nepal, the Boise Art Museum, Albany Institute of History and Art and the Everson Museum, Syracuse, NY. In 2018, her work, "A Key to the City: Three Ways of Visualizing Jewish Heritage in Lviv" was exhibited at the Lviv Center for Urban History of East Central Europe.

Stevens's work has interpreted the Holocaust in Ukraine in a series of sculptures called The Broken Fragments of My Heart. They reimagine the deep ravines of Ukraine where more than a million Jews were shot during World War II by the German SS and police death squads in what became known as "Holocaust by bullet".

== Fellowships ==
- 2018 Fulbright Scholar to Ukraine: A Key to the City: Three Ways of Visualizing Jewish Heritage in Lviv
- 2006 Fulbright Scholar to Nepal: Sojourner for Form: Sacred Sites and Newari Metal Techniques of the Kathmandu Valley
