= Rachel Zajac =

New Zealand forensic psychologist and academic

- Education: University of Otago
- Known for: Memory and cross-examination of children
- Awards: National Tertiary Teaching Excellence Award (2016)
- Scientific career
- Fields: Forensic psychology
- Workplaces: University of Otago
- Thesis: The effect of cross-examination on the reliability and credibility of children's testimony (2002)

Rachel Zajac is a New Zealand forensic psychologist and professor at the University of Otago in Dunedin.

== Academic career ==
Zajac graduated from the University of Otago in 2002 with a PhD. Her thesis was titled "The effect of cross-examination on the reliability and credibility of children's testimony". She joined the Department of Psychology as a lecturer the following year and was appointed associate professor in 2016. In December 2019 she was promoted to full professor with effect from 1 February 2020.

In March 2015, when a senior lecturer, Zajac won a Teaching Excellence Award presented by the University of Otago, and in August 2016 she won a National Tertiary Teaching Excellence Award valued at NZ$20,000.

Zajac has worked as an expert witness and also trained police, judges, lawyers and forensic scientists in the psychological aspects of criminal investigations. Her research focus is on the evidence given by eyewitnesses, how memory is influenced by social conditions and the interpretation of evidence as it is affected by psychological issues.

== Select publications ==
=== Book chapters ===
- Rachel Zajac. "Investigative interviewing in the courtroom: Child witnesses under cross-examination" in Bull, Ray; Valentine, Tim; Williamson, Tom, eds. (2009), Handbook of psychology of investigative interviewing: Current developments and future directions, Wiley-Blackwell, ISBN 978-0-470-51267-8 doi: 10.1002/9780470747599.ch10
- Rachel Zajac, "Child sexual abuse complainants under cross-examination: The ball is in our court" in Smaal, Yorick; Kaladelfos, Amanda; Finnane, Mike, eds. (2016), The sexual abuse of children: Recognition and redress, Monash University Publishing, ISBN 978-1-925377-38-5

=== Journal articles ===
- Rachel Zajac; Nina Westera; Andy Kaladelfos (1 January 2017). "The 'Good Old Days' of Courtroom Questioning: Changes in the Format of Child Cross-Examination Questions Over 60 Years". Child Maltreatment: 186–195. doi:10.1177/1077559517733815. hdl:1959.4/unsworks_56839. ISSN 1077-5595. PMID 29020792.
- Mohammed M Ali; Nina J Westera; Rachel Zajac; Martine B Powell (5 September 2019). "Australian stakeholders'; views on improving investigative interviews with adult sexual assault complainants". Psychiatry, Psychology and Law. 26 (5): 724–739. doi:10.1080/13218719.2019.1618748. ISSN 1321-8719. PMC 6896420. PMID 31984107.
- Maryanne Garry; Lorraine Hope; Rachel Zajac; Ayesha J Verrall; Jamie M Robertson (10 December 2020). "Contact Tracing: A Memory Task With Consequences for Public Health". Perspectives on Psychological Science: 175–187. doi:10.1177/1745691620978205. ISSN 1745-6916. PMID 33301692.
