= Rachel Parsons =

Rachel Parsons may refer to:

- Rachel Mary Parsons (1885–1956), British engineer
- Rachel Parsons (figure skater) (born 1997), American ice dancer
