= Rachel Owens =

Artist (b. 1972)

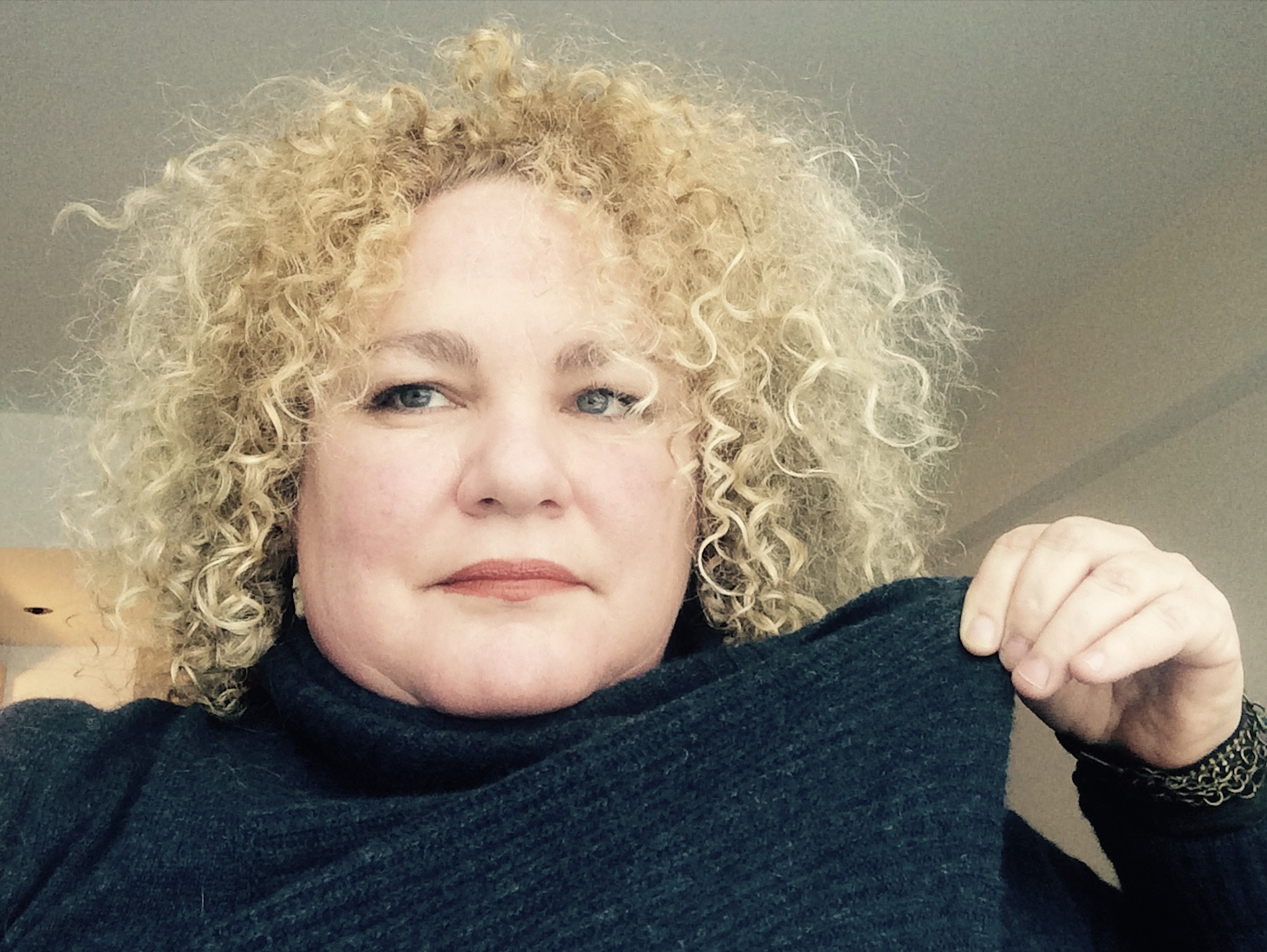
- Born: Rachel Owens; 1972 (age 53–54); Atlanta, Georgia
- Education: School of the Art Institute of Chicago
- Awards: Cultural Humanitarian Grant, US State Department, 2016 Joan Mitchell Grant, 2013 Pollack-Krasner Grant 2008 Harpo Foundation Grant 2007
- Website: www.rachelowensart.org

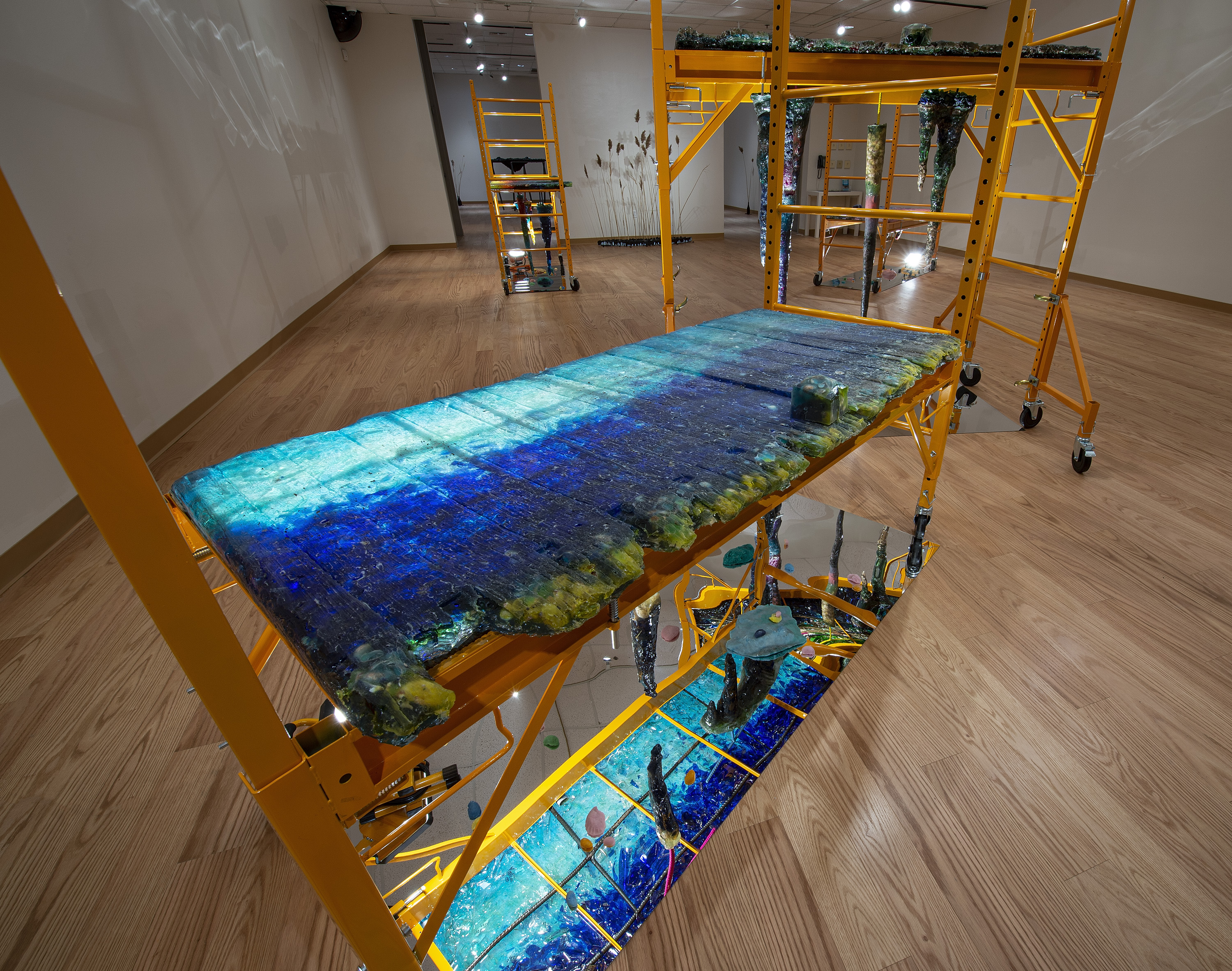
Installation: The Hypogean Tip, 2020 Housatonic Museum of Art Photo courtesy of Paul Mutino

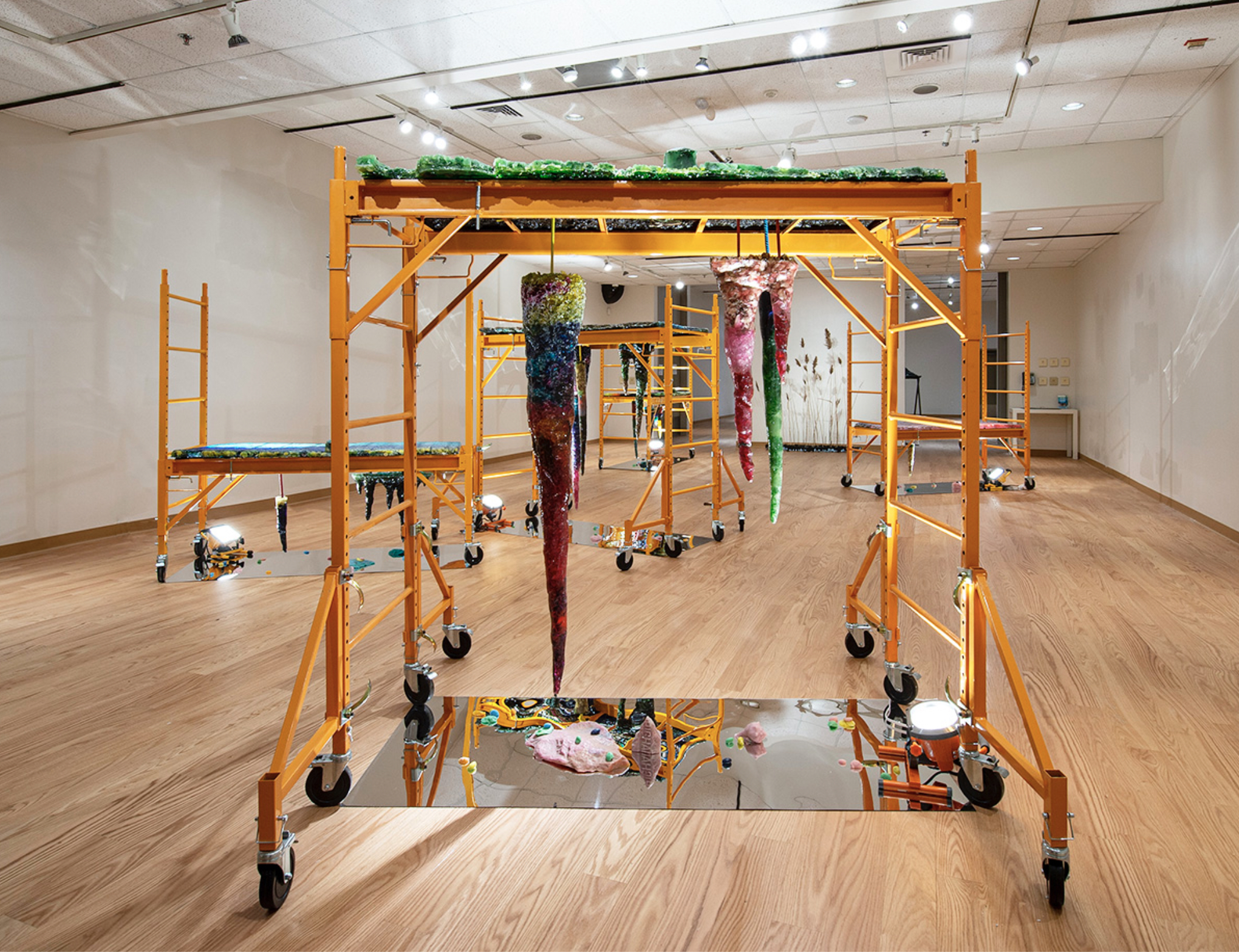
Installation: The Hypogean Tip, 2020Housatonic Museum of Art Photo courtesy of Paul Mutino

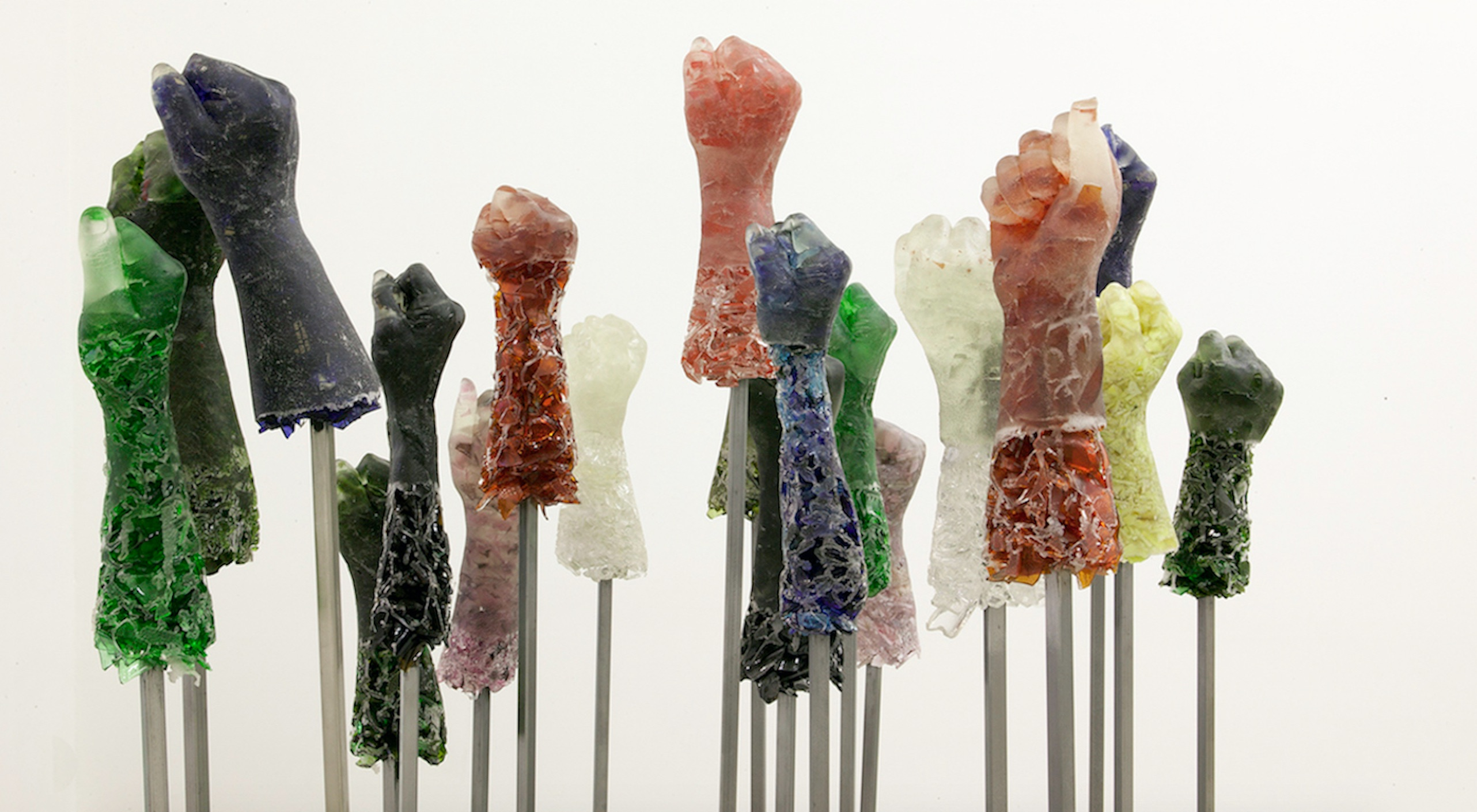
POP's, 2015, part of exhibition Smile Always, Ziehersmith Gallery NYC

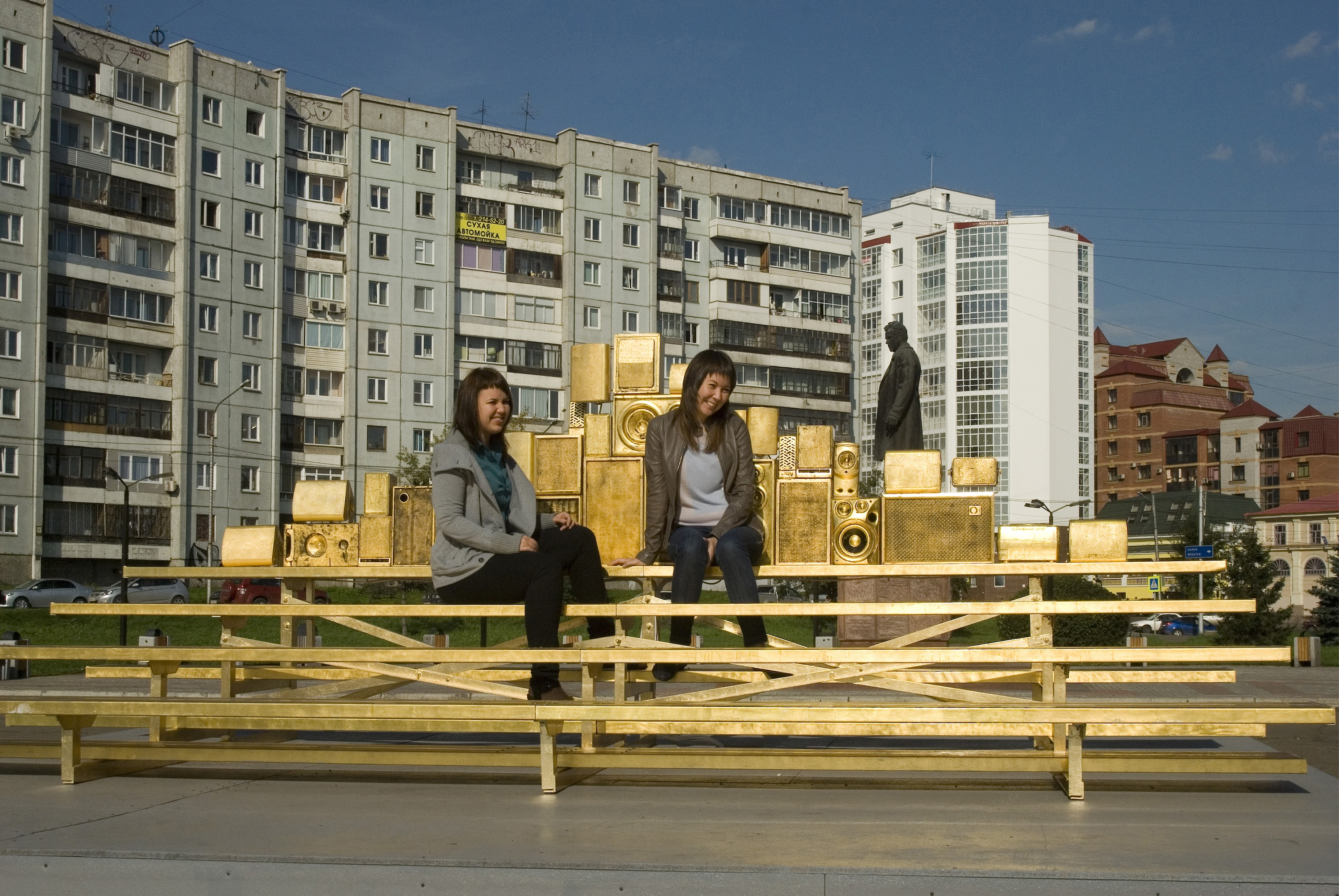
Almost Antipodeans, 2013 Kraznoyarsk, RU

Rachel Owens (born in Atlanta, Georgia, in 1972) is an American artist. She is best known for her multi-media sculptures and installations, which often incorporate a social component. Many of her works are made from crushed glass. She lives and works in New York, NY, and is an assistant professor of art and design at Purchase College, SUNY.

Engaged in broad fields of practice from public art and traditional gallery work to activist based Community Theater, Owens tackles issues of hierarchical social conditions, environmental destruction, consumption and the points where these things intersect. Working sculpturally, performatively and socially, she uses material as meaning: what the sculpture is made of- is what the sculpture means- is what the sculpture does. Bottle shards, cardboard, coal, cut up humvees, and the dust of marble are all used to convey meaning, emotion, and action as they take on forms from porch to iceberg. Often with jobs beyond metaphor, the sculptures become stages, public seating, centers for protest and elevated vantage points.

Owens has been included in exhibitions both in the US and internationally including The X Krasnoyarsk Biennial, RU; Franco Soffiantino Contemporary, IT; Austrian Cultural Forum, NY; The Frist Museum, TN; Socrates Sculpture Park, LIC; and the New Museum Window, NY among others. In February 2020, her solo museum show, The Hypogean Tip opened at The Housatonic Museum of Art in Bridgeport CT. She has had reviews and inclusion in publications including The New York Times, The New Yorker, Art in America, Modern Painters, Flash Art and Triple Canopy Anthology, and she has received grants from the Joan Mitchell, Pollack Krasner, and Harpo Foundations as well as a Cultural Humanitarian Grant from the US consulate. Her work can be found in many collections in the US and abroad, among them; The Beth Rudin Dewoody Collection, The Pritzker Family, Sprint Collection and D. Mullin JR. Owens is assistant professor of art & design and chair of the sculpture department at SUNY Purchase College.

== Education ==
Owens received a BFA from the University of Kansas, Lawrence. She received an MFA from the School of the Art Institute of Chicago in 1999.

== Exhibitions ==
Owens has exhibited internationally.

=== Solo, 2-person and public representations ===
- 2020: Hypogean Tip, Housatonic Museum of Art, Bridgeport CT
- 2019: Museum of the Cave of the Anthropocene, Untitled, Miami, FL (with Esteban Ocamp-Giraldo)
- 2017: MOTHER, Ziehersmith, NYC,
- 2016: Inveterate Composition for Clare, Purchase College, Purchase, NY (ongoing)
- 2015: Smile Always, Ziehersmith and Horton Gallery, NYC
- 2013: Almost Antipodeans, BAM Fischer, Brooklyn | Inveterate Composition for Clare, Frist Center for the Arts, Nashville | Soft Edges, Track 13, Nashville
- 2012: She's Crafty: Emergency Making Action, New Museum window, NYC
- 2011: Inveterate Composition for Clare, Dag Hammarskjöld Park, New York
- 2010: Props, ZieherSmith, New York
- 2008: Harboring, ZieherSmith, New York
- 2007: Wishing Well, presented by ZieherSmith, NADA Art Fair, Miami
- 2006: Overthrows, ZieherSmith, New York
- 2005: Scatter-Hoarder, ZieherSmith, New York

=== Select group exhibitions ===
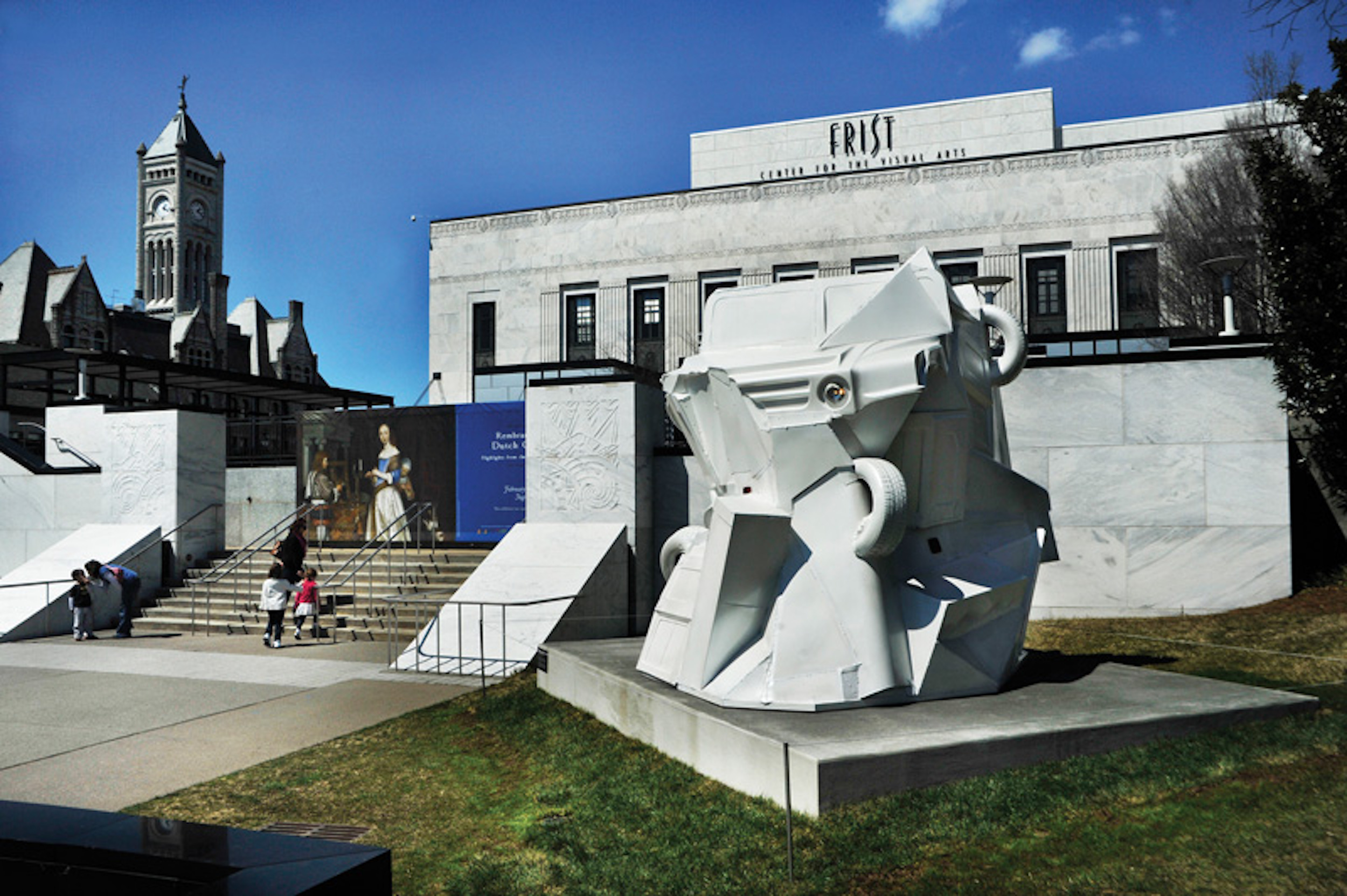
Inveterate Composition for Clare, 2012, Frist Museum of Art, Nashville, Tennessee

- 2020: Happy Hardcore, Miriam Gallery, Brooklyn New York
- 2017: Inaugural Exhibition, The Bunker, Collection of Beth Rudin Dewoody, Palm Beach Florida (through 2019) | Dead Horse Bay, Agnes Varis Center for the Arts, Brooklyn, New York Post-Election, September Gallery, Hudson, New York | Double Edged, Circuit 12, Dallas, Texas | It’s Happening: 50 Years of Public Art in NYC Parks | Phillip Johnson Glass House Summer Benefit, New Canaan Connecticut
- 2016: Kansas City Artists Coalition: 40 years, Kansas City, Missouri | Brural, Temporary Storage, curated by Ilya Shipolovisch, Brooklyn | 12x12, Black Ball Projects, Brooklyn | Gut Rehab, Realty Collective, Brooklyn (organized and exhibited)
- 2015: Artists at Work, The Cantor Center, Stanford University, Stanford California (through 2016) | Alchemy, DC Moore, NYC | Fall Fete, Momenta Art, Brooklyn, New York
- 2014: Untitled, Ziehersmith and Horton, Miami | Romeo and Juliet, Scenic Designer, Falconworks Production, Brooklyn, New York
- 2013: X Krasnoyarsk Biennial, Krasnoyarsk Russia | Creative Time Sandcastle Competition, Klaus Biesenbach judge, Queens
- 2012: Next Wave Art, BAM, Brooklyn New York
- 2011: BNA, ZieherSmith, Nashville, Tennessee
- 2010: Nineteen Eighty-Four, Austrian Cultural Forum, curated by David Harper, Martha Kirszenbaum, & David Komary, New York | Evading Customs_Milan, Le Dictateur, Milan | Knock Knock Who's There? That Joke Isn't Funny Anymore, Armand Bartos Fine Art, New York |
- 2009: Evading Customs, curated by Peter Russo and Lumi Tan, Brown, London | NADA/ART IN/VISIBLE SPACES, 395 Flushing, Brooklyn, New York | Grand Reopening, ZieherSmith, New York
- Lover, curated by Kate Gilmore and Candice Madey, On Stellar Rays, New York On From Here, Guild and Greyshkul, New York | I Thought Our Worlds Were The Same, Zeitgeist Gallery, Nashville
- 2008: New Black, presented by Triplecanopy, Starr Space, Brooklyn, New York
- 2007: EFA 2007 Exhibition (Groundswell), Socrates Sculpture Park, Long Island City, New York
- 2006: Empathetic, curated by Elizabeth Thomas, Temple Gallery, Philadelphia | Ionesco's Friends, curated Irina Zucca, Francosoffiantino Artecontemporanea, Turin
- 2005: No Apology for Breathing, Jack the Pelican Presents, Brooklyn | The Hissing of Summer Lawns, Sara Nightingale Gallery, Watermill, New York
- 2004: Some Exhaust, Lehmann Maupin Gallery, New York | Postcards from the Edge, Brent Sikkema Gallery, New York | Andy Warhol’s Living Room, Sara Nightingale Gallery, Watermill, New York | Falling in Love with the Jailer’s Daughter, Project Green, Brooklyn, New York
- 2003: Brooklyn Underground Film Festival, DUMBO, Brooklyn, New York | Talent Show, Project Green, Brooklyn, New York | Occurrences: The Performative Aspects of Video, Betty Rymer Gallery, Chicago
- 2002: One Day, In a Day, Everyday, part of Sans, APEX art, New York (curated by Mira Schor) | New Homes for America Under Construction, Weather Records, Brooklyn, New York | Parallel Sensations, Williamsburg Art and Historical Center, Brooklyn, New York
- 2000: Hit and Run 4, New York curated by Edward Winkelman

== Public commissions ==
- The Hypogean Tip, Housatonic Museum of Art, Bridgeport CT, 2020
- Life on the Other Side of a Broken Glass Ceiling, NYC Parks Department, 2017
- Machinations, Yeltsin Center, Performance commissioned by US Consulate Moscow, 2016
- Almost Antipodeans, X Krasnoyarsk Biennial, commissioned by BAM and Mikhail Prokhorov Foundation, 2013
- Skin (US), Brooklyn Academy of Music, 2012
- Inveterate Composition for Clare, NYC Parks Department, 2011
- Privet, Austrian Cultural Forum, 2010
- Groundswell, Socrates Sculpture Park, 2007
- Wishing Well, NADA Art Fair, Miami 2007

== Awards and recognition ==
Owens' work has been discussed in the New York Times, Art in America, Hyperallergic, Urban Glass, Sculpture Magazine, and the Village Voice, among other publications. She has received grants from the Joan Mitchell Foundation, the Pollock-Krasner Foundation, the Harpo Foundation, and the United States Embassy in Russia.

== Catalogues and publications ==
The Hypogean Tip, with essays from Robbin Zella, Maisa Tisdale and Stamatina Gregory, Housatonic Museum of Art February 2020

Gut Rehab, newspaper project in conjunction with exhibition, with contributions from Adam Helms, Scott Zieher, Ilya Shipilovitch, Mira Schor

F15, publication as part of Smile Always at Ziehersmith Gallery, NYC 2015 Kraznoyarsk Biennial, essay from Anna Tolstova 2013

Invalid Format: Triple Canopy Anthology, vol. 1, 2012

Nineteen Eighty-Four, Austrian Cultural Forum, essay by David Harper 2010 EAF 2007, Socrates Sculpture Park, essay from Alyson Baker, 2007
