= Rachel Bianchi-Quarshie =

Ghanaian aviator

Rachel Bianchi-Quarshie is a Ghanaian pilot and was the youngest female in the country to fly at a commercial airline.

== Biography ==
Rachel Bianchi-Quarshie is among the few female aviators in Ghana. She became interested in becoming a pilot at the young age of ten when she saw a pilot. She was abused by her step father while growing up and her family was financially incapable of helping her pursue her dream of becoming a pilot. Unable to look further, she enrolled at a school of accountancy and obtained the second part professional Association of Chartered Certified Accountants (ACCA) certification at the age of 22. She later received financial assistance from friends to pursue an education in flight training, which she started in 2008 at Bournemouth Commercial Flight Training Centre in the United Kingdom where part of her family lived. She went on to study at the Stapleford Flight Centre and was awarded the Commencement to Air Transport Pilot Licence in 2010. She again enrolled at the Flight Safety International in the United States in 2011 to obtain a US commercial license. She was awarded One of the "Top 20 2019 global women of excellence" from the Multi Ethnic Advisory Task Force of US congressman Danny K. Davis
