= Rachael Stolzenberg-Solomon =

American epidemiologist and dietitian

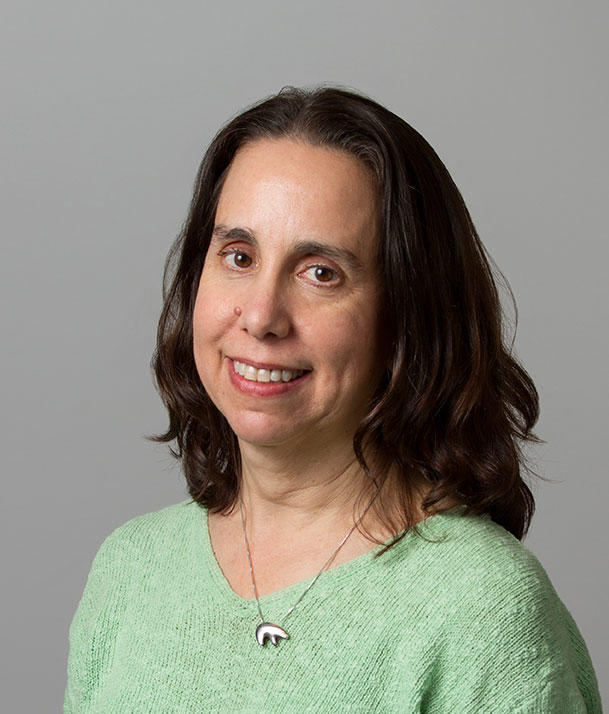
- Education: University of California, Davis; Vanderbilt University; Johns Hopkins Bloomberg School of Public Health
- Scientific career
- Fields: Metabolic epidemiology, nutrition
- Workplaces: National Cancer Institute
- Doctoral advisor: F. Javier Nieto
- Other academic advisors: Demetrius Albanes

Rachael Zoe Stolzenberg-Solomon is an American epidemiologist and dietitian. She is a senior investigator and head of the metabolic epidemiology branch at the National Cancer Institute.

== Life ==
Stolzenberg-Solomon received a B.S. in nutrition and dietetics at the University of California, Davis, followed by a dietetic internship and M.Ed. in health science (nutrition) education at Vanderbilt University Medical Center and Peabody College, respectively. After this training, she worked as a registered dietitian for ten years.

She has an M.P.H. with concentrations in epidemiology and nutrition and a Ph.D., in epidemiology from the Johns Hopkins Bloomberg School of Public Health. Her 1998 dissertation was titled, Pancreatic cancer risk and nutrition-related methyl group availability serum indicators and genetic polymorphisms. Her doctoral advisor was F. Javier Nieto. Demetrius Albanes was her preceptor at the National Cancer Institute (NCI). Stolzenberg-Solomon joined NCI in 1996 as a predoctoral fellow in the cancer prevention studies branch of the former division of cancer prevention and control and later the center for cancer research and was a cancer prevention fellow in the division of cancer prevention and the division of cancer epidemiology and genetics (DCEG). During her fellowship, she worked closely with Joseph Tangrea and Philip R. Taylor.

She became an investigator in DCEG in 2002, and was awarded NIH scientific tenure and promoted to senior investigator in 2011. She heads the metabolic epidemiology branch. Stolzenberg-Solomon has focused much of her research on elucidating the etiology of pancreatic cancer. She has examined dietary, other lifestyle, and genetic factors, including biomarkers related to insulin resistance and metabolomics that may help reveal underlying mechanisms of carcinogenesis. In addition to her work on pancreatic cancer, she has pursued, on a limited basis, other nutrition-related hypotheses including biomarkers in nutritional intervention studies. Stolzenberg-Solomon is a fellow of the American College of Epidemiology and a member of the American Epidemiological Society.
