= Alfreda de Silva =

Sri Lankan poet, journalist and television screenwriter

Rachel Lilian Alfreda de Silva (née Perera; 1920 - 2001) was a Sri Lankan poet, journalist and television screenwriter.

== Biography ==
De Silva studied at St John's College and Girton School, both at Nugegoda, and qualified as a teacher. She later received a Ford Foundation grant to spend a year at the Yale Experimental Theatre and Drama School.

== Selected works ==
- De Silva, A. (1973). Children's poems. Colombo: Hansa Pub.
- De Silva, A. (1977). Out of the dark the sun. Place of publication not identified: publisher not identified.
- De Silva, A. (1990). Pagoda House: Recollections of childhood. Colombo: Alfreda de Silva.
