= Rahel Tschopp =

Swiss footballer (born 2000)

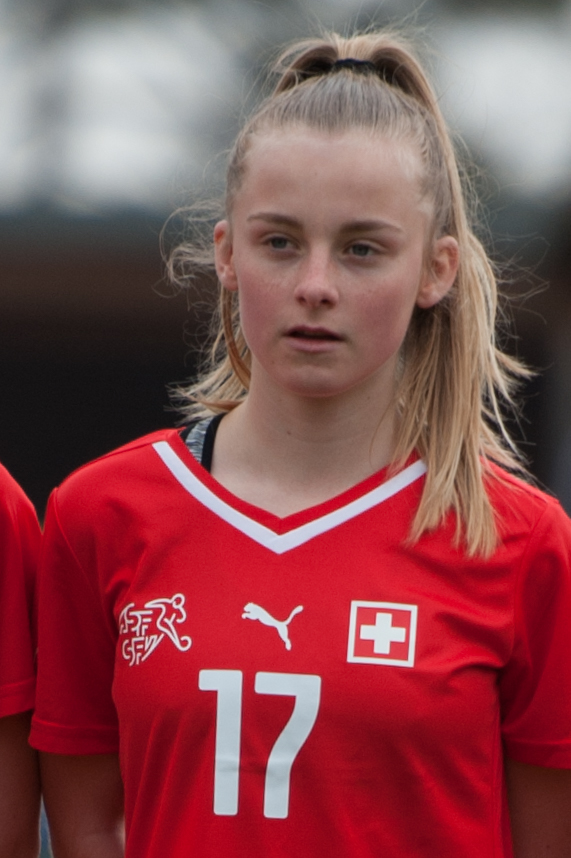
- Tschopp in 2016

Personal information
- Date of birth: 30 May 2000 (age 26)
- Position: Midfielder

International career^{‡}
Years	Team	Apps	(Gls)
- Switzerland
- ‡ National team caps and goals as of 19:21, 30 August 2019 (UTC)

Rahel Tschopp (born 30 May 2000) is a Swiss footballer who plays as a midfielder and has appeared for the Switzerland national team.

== Career ==
=== Club ===
Tschopp joined FC Sachseln when she was just nine years old. In August 2014 she moved to FC Luzern. At FC Sachseln as well as at FC Luzern, she trained and played with boys. Tschopp has been part of the women's team in FC Luzern's National League A since 2016.

=== National team ===
In July 2018, Tschopp played with the Swiss U19 national team at the U19 European Championships at home in Switzerland. She made her debut in the senior team of Switzerland in the World Cup qualifier for the 2019 World Cup in France on November 9, 2018.
