= Rachel Baskerville =

New Zealand accounting academic

- Born: 1951 (age 74–75)
- Education: Victoria University of Wellington
- Scientific career
- Workplaces: Victoria University of Wellington
- Thesis: Dimensions of CCA-1: an Oral History Study of the Failure of the Inflation Accounting Standard in New Zealand (1994)

Rachel Baskerville (born 1951) is a New Zealand academic, and lecturer at Victoria University of Wellington from 1996 to 2020.

== Academic career ==
After a thesis titled 'Dimensions of CCA-1: an Oral History Study of the Failure of the Inflation Accounting Standard in New Zealand' at the Victoria University of Wellington, Baskerville rose to full professor.

== Selected works ==
- Baskerville, Rachel F. "Hofstede never studied culture." Accounting, organizations and society 28, no. 1 (2003): 1–14.
- Baskerville-Morley, Rachel F. "A research note: the unfinished business of culture." Accounting, Organizations and Society 30, no. 4 (2005): 389–391.
- Baskerville, Rachel, and Lisa Evans. The darkening glass: Issues for translation of IFRS. The Institute of Chartered Accountants of Scotland, 2011.
- Cordery, Carolyn J., and Rachel F. Baskerville. "Charity financial reporting regulation: a comparative study of the UK and New Zealand." Accounting History 12, no. 1 (2007): 7-27.
