= The Hound of the Baskervilles (disambiguation) =

The Hound of the Baskervilles is the third of four Sherlock Holmes novels written by Sir Arthur Conan Doyle.

The Hound of the Baskervilles may also refer to:

== Film ==
- Der Hund von Baskerville, a 1914 German silent film
- The Hound of the Baskervilles (1921 film), a British silent film starring Eille Norwood
- The Hound of the Baskervilles (1929 film), a German silent mystery film starring Carlyle Blackwell
- The Hound of the Baskervilles (1932 film), a British film starring John Stuart
- The Hound of the Baskervilles (1937 film), a German film starring Bruno Güttner,
- The Hound of the Baskervilles (1939 film), an American film starring Basil Rathbone
- The Hound of the Baskervilles (1959 film), a British film starring Peter Cushing
- The Hound of the Baskervilles (1978 film), a British comedy film starring Peter Cook

== Television ==
- The Hound of the Baskervilles, a two part episode of the 1968 British television series Sherlock Holmes starring Peter Cushing
- The Hound of the Baskervilles, a 1971 Soviet television film starring Alexander Kaidanovsky
- The Hound of the Baskervilles (1972 film), an American television film starring Stewart Granger
- The Hound of the Baskervilles (1981 film), a Soviet television film starring Vasily Livanov
- The Hound of the Baskervilles (TV serial), a 1982 British television serial starring Tom Baker
- The Hound of the Baskervilles (1983 film), a British television film starring Ian Richardson
- The Hound of the Baskervilles, a 1988 feature-length episode of the British television series The Return of Sherlock Holmes starring Jeremy Brett
- The Hound of the Baskervilles (2000 film), a Canadian television film starring Matt Frewer
- The Hound of the Baskervilles (2002 film), a British television film starring Richard Roxburgh

== See also ==
- Sherlock Holmes and the Baskerville Curse, a 1983 Australian animated television film featuring the voice of Peter O'Toole
- "The Hounds of the Baskervilles", a 1999 episode of the U.K./U.S. animated television series Sherlock Holmes in the 22nd Century
- "The Hounds of Baskerville", a 2012 episode of the British television series Sherlock
- "Hounded", a 2016 episode of the American television series Elementary
