= Raymond =

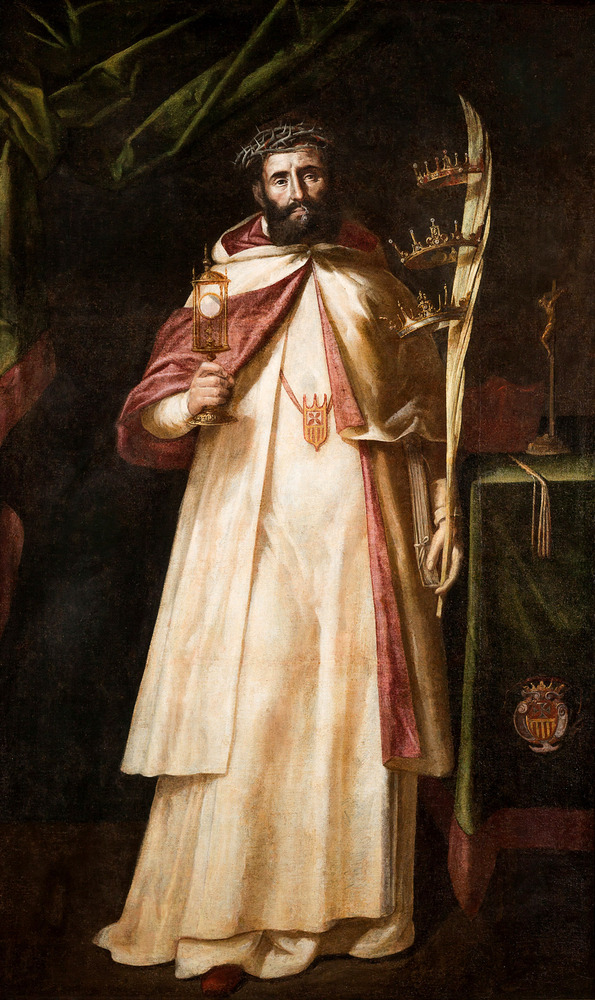
- Saint Raymond Nonnatus
- Pronunciation: /ˈreɪmənd/ French pronunciation: [ʁɛmɔ̃]
- Gender: Male
- Language: German

Origin
- Origin: Germanic
- Meaning: Counseling protector or Famous protector
- Region of origin: Northern Europe

Other names
- Nickname: Ray
- Derived: Ramona

Raymond is a male given name of Germanic origin. It was borrowed into English from French (older French spellings were Reimund and Raimund, whereas the modern English and French spellings are identical). It originated as the Germanic ᚱᚨᚷᛁᚾᛗᚢᚾᛞ (Raginmund) or ᚱᛖᚷᛁᚾᛗᚢᚾᛞ (Reginmund). Ragin (Gothic) and regin (Old German) meant "counsel". The Old High German mund originally meant "hand", but came to mean "protection". This etymology suggests that the name originated in the Early Middle Ages, possibly from Latin. Alternatively, the name can also be derived from Germanic Hraidmund, the first element being Hraid, possibly meaning "fame" (compare Hrod, found in names such as Robert, Roderick, Rudolph, Roland, Rodney and Roger) and mund meaning "protector".

Despite the German and French origins of the English name, some of its early uses in English documents appear in Latinized form. As a surname, its first recorded appearance in Britain appeared in 1086, during the reign of William the Conqueror, in the Domesday Book, with a reference to Giraldus Reimundus.

The most commonly used names for baby boys based on "Ragin" in 2009 were, in descending order, Raymond, Ramiro, Rayner, Rein, Reingard, Reynard, and Reynold. Its many other variants include Raiment, Raimo, Raimond, Raimondi, Raimondo, Raimund, Raimundo, Ramon, Ramón, Ramond, Ramondelli, Ramondenc, Ramondi, Ramondini, Ramondino, Ramondo, Ramondou, Ramonenc, Ramonic, Ramundi, Rayment, Raymonenc, Raymonencq, Raymont, Raymund, Redmond, Redmonds, Reim, Reimund, Reinmund, Rémon, Rémond, Reimondo, Remondeau, Remondon, Rémont, Reymond, Rimondi, and Rimondini.

== Translations and variations ==
- Albanian: Rajmond
- Ancient Germanic: Raginmund, Raimund
- Arabic: ريمون (Rimun)
- Basque: Erramun, Erramon
- Belarusian: Райманд (Rajmand)
- Bengali: রেমন্ড (Rēmanḍa)
- Bulgarian: Реймонд (Rejmond)
- Catalan: Ramon, Raimon
- Chinese Simplified: 雷蒙德
- Chinese Traditional: 雷蒙德
- Croatian: Rajmund
- Czech: Rajmund
- Danish: Ramund
- Dutch: Remon, Ramone, Raemon, Raemonn, Ramond, Ramonte, Remone
- English: Raymund, Raymond, Ray, Raymon, Rayman, Raymann, Raymen, Raymone, Raymun, Raemonn, Redmond, Radmond, Radmund, Reddin, Redmund, Reimond, Reymon, Reymound, Reymund, Raimond, Raimonds
- Estonian: Raimund, Raimond
- Finnish: Raimo, Reima
- French: Raymond, Raymonde (feminine), Reimonde
- German: Raimund, Reimund
- Greek: Ραϋμόνδος (Raf̱̈móndos, Raÿmóndos), also Ρεμούνδος (Remoúndos)
- Gujarati: રેમન્ડ (Rēmanḍa)
- Hebrew: ריימונד
- Hindi: रेमंड (Rēmaṇḍa)
- Hungarian: Ramón, Rajmund
- Indonesian: Raimundus, Raymond, Remon, Raymundus, Raymund
- Irish: Réamann, Radmond, Redmond, Redmund, Reamonn, Ré
- Italian: Raimondo, Raimondi, Raymondo, Reimondo, Reimundo
- Japanese: レイモンド (Reimondo), レーモンド (Rēmondo)
- Kannada: ರೇಮಂಡ್ (Rēmaṇḍ)
- Marathi: रेमंड (Rēmaṇḍ)
- Korean: 레이몬드 (Reimondeu)
- Latin: Raimundus
- Latvian: Raimonds
- Limburgish: Remao, Mao
- Lithuanian: Raimundas, Raimondas
- Macedonian: Рејмонд (Rejmond)
- Nepali: रेमंड (Rēmaṇḍa)
- Norwegian: Rådmund, Råmund
- Old Norse: Ráðmundr, Rámundr
- Persian: ریموند
- Polish: Rajmund
- Portuguese: Raimundo
- Punjabi: ਰੇਮੰਡ (Rēmaḍa)
- Romanian: Reimond
- Russian: Раймонд (Raymond)
- Scots: Raymond, Raymie, Ray
- Scottish Gaelic: Reamonn
- Serbian: Рејмонд (Rejmond)
- Slovene: Rajmund
- Spanish: Raymond, Raimundo, Raymundo, Raemondo, Raimondo, Raimando, Raimundo, Raimond, Raymondo, Reymundo, Reimundo, Mundo, Mando, Raimon, Raiman, Ramón
- Swedish: Ramunder
- Tagalog: Ramón, Raymundo
- Bisaya: Rimond
- Tamil: ரேமண்ட் (Rēmaṇṭ)
- Telugu: రేమండ్ (Rēmaṇḍ)
- Thai: เรย์มอนด์ (Rey̒ mxn d̒)
- Ukrainian: Раймонд (Raymond)
- Urdu: ریمنڈ
- Welsh: Raimwnt
- Yiddish: רייַמאָנד (Ryyamʼánd)
- Yoruba: Remondi

== Given name ==
=== People ===
==== Pre-modern era ====
===== Nobility =====
- Raymond I of Toulouse (died 865)
- Raymond II of Toulouse (died 924)
- Raymond III of Toulouse (died 978)
- Raymond IV of Toulouse (c. 1041 or 1042–1105), Count of Tripoli from 1102 to 1105
- Raymond V of Toulouse (1134–1198)
- Raymond VI, Count of Toulouse (1156–1222)
- Raymond VII, Count of Toulouse (1197–1249)
- Raymond II of Tripoli (c. 1115–1152), Count of Tripoli from 1137 to 1152
- Raymond III of Tripoli (c. 1142–1187), Count of Tripoli from 1152 to 1187
- Raymond of Poitiers (c. 1115–1149), Prince of Antioch
- Raymond Roger Trencavel (1185–1209)
- Raymond of Burgundy (1070–1107), married to Queen Urraca of Castile
- Raymond of Antioch (c. 1195–1213), eldest son of Bohemond IV of Antioch

===== Saints =====
- Raymond of Penyafort (c. 1175–1275), medieval Catalan canon lawyer; patron of canon lawyers and of all lawyers in Spain
- Raymond Nonnatus (1204–1240), Catalan ransomer of hostages; patron of pregnancy, childbirth, childbirth-related professions, of the falsely accused, and of the seal of the confessional
- Raymond of Fitero (died 1163), founder of the military order of the Knights of Calatrava

===== Chroniclers =====
- Raymond of Aguilers (1096–1099), chronicler of the First Crusade

==== Modern world ====
===== Artists and entertainers =====
- Ray Romano, actor who played Ray Barone in Everybody loves Raymond
- Raymond Antrobus (born 1986), British poet
- Raymond Bagatsing (born 1967), Filipino actor
- Raymond Bailey (1904–1980), American actor
- Ray Bolger (1904–1987), American entertainer of stage and screen
- Raymond Bouchard (1945–2026), Canadian actor
- Ray Bradbury (1920–2012), American science fiction and fantasy author
- Raymond Briggs (1934–2022), English illustrator, cartoonist, graphic novelist, and author
- Raymond Burr (1917–1993), Canadian actor
- Raymond Carver (1938–1988), American short story writer and poet
- Raymond Chandler (1888–1959), American novelist and screenwriter
- Ray Charles (1930–2004), American singer, songwriter and pianist
- Raymond Chow (1927–2018), Hong Kong film producer
- Raymond Dalton (born 1990), American singer-songwriter, vocalist on Can't Hold Us
- Raymond E. Feist (born 1945), American fantasy writer
- Ray Gillen (1959–1993), American rock singer-songwriter
- Raymond Gutierrez (born 1984), Filipino host
- Ray Harryhausen (1920–2013), American-British animator and special effects creator
- Raymond Hawthorne (1936–2025), New Zealand theatre director
- Ray William Johnson (born 1981), American internet comedian, actor and musician
- Raymond Kaskey (born 1943), American sculptor
- Raymond van de Klundert, also known as Ray Kluun (born 1964), Dutch novelist
- Raymond Lam (born 1979), Hong Kong singer and actor
- Raymond Lauchengco (born 1964), Filipino actor and singer
- Raymond Leppard (1927–2019), British-American conductor, harpsichordist, composer and editor
- Raymond Massey (1896–1983), Canadian actor
- Raymond S. Persi (born 1975), American actor
- Raymond Pettibon (born 1957), American artist
- Raymond Queneau (1903–1976), French poet and novelist
- Raymond Ramnarine, Trinidadian and Tobagonian singer
- Raymond Scott (1908–1994), American composer, band leader, pianist, engineer, record producer, and inventor
- Raymond Smullyan (1919–2017), American mathematician, concert pianist, logician, Taoist philosopher, and magician
- Raymond Sudre (1870–1962), French sculptor
- Raymond Joseph Teller (born 1948), one-half of the duo Penn & Teller
- Raymond Templier (1891–1968), French jewellery designer
- Raymond Wong Pak-ming (born 1948), Hong Kong actor and film producer
- Raymond Wong Ho-yin (born 1975), Hong Kong actor

===== Politicians and activists =====
- Raymond Baldwin (1893–1986), American politician
- Raymond Eddé (1913–2000), Lebanese politician
- Raymond L. Finch (1940–2023), judge of the District Court of the Virgin Islands
- Raymond Gagnon (born 1948), American politician
- Raymond Garneau (born 1935), Canadian politician
- Raymond Ho (born 1939), member of the Legislative Council of Hong Kong
- Raymond Höptner (born 1999), German politician
- Raymond Mhlaba (1920–2005), South African anti-apartheid activist
- Raymond Poincaré (1860–1934), President of France and leader of France during World War I

===== Religious figures =====
- Raymond Leo Burke (born 1948), American Roman Catholic prelate
- Raymond Lahey (1940–2022), Canadian disgraced former Roman Catholic bishop
- Raymond Pichard, French priest and television presenter

===== Scientists =====
- Raymond Cattell (1905–1998), British-American psychologist
- Raymond Davis Jr. (1914–2006), American chemist and Nobel Prize winner in physics
- Raymond Gesteland, American geneticist
- Raymond Herb (1908–1996), American nuclear physicist

===== Sportsmen =====
- Raymond van Barneveld (born 1967), Dutch darts player
- Raymond Berry (born 1933), American football player
- Raymond Calais (born 1998), American football player
- Raymond Daniels (martial artist) (born 1980), American martial artist
- Raymond Domenech (born 1952), French football manager
- Raymond Hunter (1938–2020), Irish cricketer and rugby union player
- Raymond Kopa (1931–2017), French football player
- Raymond Riotte (1940–2026), French road bicycle racer
- Raymond Rowe (born 1984), American professional wrestler
- Raymond Townsend (born 1955), American basketball player
- Raymond Vohasek (born 1999), American football player

===== Other =====
- Raymond Arsenault (born 1948), American historian
- Raymond Clare Nowland, Australian architect
- Raymond Bernard (1923–2006), French esotericist
- Raymond Bessone (1911–1992), British hairdresser known as "Mr Teasy-Weasy"
- Raymond B. Blake, Canadian historian
- Raymond Blanc (born 1949), French chef
- Raymond S. Brandes (1924–2014), American archeologist and historian
- Raymond Byrd (1895–1926), African-American kidnapped victim
- Raymond Chien (born 1952), president of MTR and chairman of Hang Seng Bank in Hong Kong
- Raymond Fife (died 1985), American murder victim
- Ray Honeyford (1934–2012), English headmaster and writer
- Raymond Kelly (born 1941), Commissioner of the New York Police Department
- Ray Kurzweil (born 1948), American author, inventor, and futurist
- Raymond Lisle (1910–1994), American attorney, officer in the US Foreign Service, and Dean of Brooklyn Law School
- Raymond Loewy (1893–1986), French-born American industrial designer
- Raymond McCreesh, Irish republican hunger striker who died in 1981
- Raymond Murray (1913–2004), US Marine Corps officer
- Raymond Washington (1953–1979), American gangster, founder of the Crips street gang
- Raymond Williams (1921–1988), Welsh academic, novelist and critic

=== Fictional characters ===
- Raymond Barone, main character in the television sitcom Everybody Loves Raymond
- Raymond Curto, a character on The Sopranos
- Raymond Cocteau, mayor/governor/dictator of San Angeles in the 1990s movie Demolition Man
- Raymond Doyle, in the British TV series The Professionals
- Father Raymond "Ray" Mukada, a character from Oz
- Raymond Reddington, main character in the English TV series The Blacklist
- Raymond Stantz, main character in the 1984 film Ghostbusters
- Raymond Shaw, main character in the novel The Manchurian Candidate played on film in 1962 by Laurence Harvey and 2004 by Liev Schreiber
- Mr. Raymond, the English name of the main character "Don Ramón" from the animated television series El Chavo Animado.
- Raymond Sullivan, antagonist of Dead Rising 2
- Raymond, a cat villager in Animal Crossing: New Horizons
- Raymond Holt, openly gay police captain in the comedy series Brooklyn Nine-Nine

=== Performance characters ===
- Raymond, the mascot for the Tampa Bay Rays Major League Baseball team

== Surname ==
=== People ===
- Adèle Raymond, wife of Augustin-Norbert Morin, hence the village of Sainte-Adèle
- Alex Raymond (1909–1956), American comic strip artist
- Alexandre Raymond (1872–1941), French architectural historian from Constantinople
- Alfred John Raymond (1856–1935), mayor of Brisbane
- Allen Raymond, American political consultant
- Antonin Raymond (1888–1976), Czech architect
- Arthur Bugs Raymond (1882–1912), American Major League Baseball pitcher
- Candy Raymond (1950–2025), Australian actress
- Carrie B. Raymond, American musician and educator
- E. A. Raymond (Edwin A. Raymond, 1861–1918), Wisconsin state legislator
- Edward Burleson Raymond (1848–1914), American rancher, politician, banker and founder of Raymondville, Texas
- Eleanor Raymond (1887–1989), American architect
- Eric S. Raymond (born 1957), American software developer
- Eugene Raymond (1923–?), South African Army major-general, Surgeon-General and physician
- Francine Raymond (born 1956), French-Canadian author-compositor-interpreter
- Gary Raymond (born 1935), British actor
- George Raymond (1914–1999), civil rights activist from Pennsylvania
- George Raymond Jr. (1943–1973), civil rights activist from Mississippi
- George Lansing Raymond (1839–1929), American professor of aesthetic criticism
- Georges Raymond (1897–1918), French World War I flying ace
- Glenda Raymond (1922–2003), Australian soprano
- Harold Raymond aka Tubby Raymond (1926–2017), American college football and baseball coach and player
- Harry Raymond (footballer), English footballer from 1908 to 1924
- Henry Jarvis Raymond (1820–1869), American journalist, founded The New York Times
- Jade Raymond (born 1974), Canadian video game producer and television personality
- Janice Raymond (model) (born 1951), Playboy Playmate of the Month for December 1974
- Jim Raymond (1917–1981), American comic strip artist
- Jonathan Raymond, American writer
- Lee Raymond (born 1938), American chairman of Exxon Mobil
- Lisa Raymond (born 1973), American tennis player
- Lucas Raymond (born 2002), Swedish ice hockey player
- Marietta Sherman Raymond (1862–1949), American violinist, musical educator, orchestral conductor
- Mason Raymond (born 1985), Canadian National Hockey League player
- Nathaniel Raymond (born 1977), American human rights investigator and anti-torture advocate
- Oliver Raymond (c.1605–1679), English MP
- Pamela Raymond, American biologist
- Paul Raymond (publisher) (1925–2008), English pornographer
- Richard Raymond (pianist) (born 1965), Canadian pianist
- Richard Raymond (Texas politician) (born 1960)
- Rosanna Raymond (born 1967), New Zealand artist, poet, and cultural commentator
- Ruth Raymond (1897–1986), English artist
- Sophia Burrell (née Raymond, 1753–1802), English poet and dramatist
- Thomas Lynch Raymond (1875–1928), twice mayor of Newark, New Jersey
- Tito Raymond (born 1969), American bodybuilder
- Usher Raymond IV, aka Usher (born 1978), American musician

=== Fictional characters ===
- Leon Raymond, a protagonist from The Haunted House animated series
- Ronnie Raymond, the first Firestorm from DC Comics

== See also ==
- Raymond-Roupen (died 1219), Prince of Antioch
- Ray (disambiguation)
- Raimond
