= Raimondi =

Raimondi may refer to:

- Raimondi (surname), an Italian surname
- Raimondi Chapel, a chapel within the church of San Pietro in Montorio, Rome
- Raimondi District, a district in the middle Atalaya Province in Peru
- Raimondi Park, park in Oakland, California, United States of America
- Raimondi Stele, a sacred object and significant piece of art of the Chavín culture
- Raimondi's yellow finch, a species of bird in the family Thraupidae

== See also ==
- Raimondo
- Raimondo (surname)
