= Raimondi (surname) =

Origin
- Derivation: Derived from Raimondo, an Italian form of the Germanic given name Raymond.
- Region of origin: Italy; Northern Italy

Other names
- Variant forms: Raimondo, Raymondo, Reimondo, Reimundo

Raimondi is an Italian surname. Notable people with the surname include:

- Aldo Raimondi (1902–1997), Italian painter
- Andrea Raimondi (born 1990), Italian footballer
- Antonio Raimondi (1824–1890), Italian-born Peruvian geographer and natural historian
- Ben Raimondi (1925–2020), American football player
- Billy Raimondi (1912–2010), American baseball player
- Carlo Raimondi (1809–1883), Italian engraver and painter
- Cristian Raimondi (born 1981), Italian footballer
- Diego Raimondi (born 1977), Argentine footballer
- Edoardo Raimondi (1837–1919), Italian painter
- Elvira Raimondi (1866–1920), Italian painter
- Elviro Raimondi, Italian painter
- Franca Raimondi (1932–1988), Italian pop singer
- Giancarlo Raimondi (born 1972), Italian cyclist
- Gianni Raimondi (1923–2008), Italian operatic tenor
- Guido Raimondi (born 1953), Italian judge
- Ildikó Raimondi (born 1962), Hungarian-Austrian operatic soprano
- Jessica Raimondi (born 1999), Italian professional racing cyclist
- John Raimondi (born 1948), American sculptor
- Leopoldo Raimondi (1938–2020), Italian footballer
- Luigi Raimondi (1912–1975), Italian Roman Catholic cardinal
- Marcantonio Raimondi (1480–1534), Italian engraver and printmaker
- Mario Raimondi (born 1980), Swiss footballer
- Nicolás Raimondi (born 1984), Uruguayan footballer
- Pietro Raimondi (1786–1853), Italian composer of sacred music and operas
- Ruggero Raimondi (born 1941), Italian bass-baritone operatic singer and actor
- Sergio Raimondi (born 1968), Argentine poet
- Stefano Raimondi (born 1998), Italian swimmer
- Timoleon Raimondi (1827–1894), Italian-born Roman Catholic Prefect and Vicar Apostolic of Hong Kong

== See also ==
- Raimondo (surname)
