= Raimond =

Male given name and family name

Raimond is both a masculine given name and a surname. Notable people with the name include:

== Given name ==
- Raimond Aumann (born 1963), German footballer
- Raimond Beccarie de Pavie, Seigneur de Fourquevaux (1508–1574), French soldier, politician and diplomat
- Raimond Gaita (born 1946), Australian philosopher
- Raimond van der Gouw (born 1963), former Dutch footballer
- Raimond Kaugver (1926–1992), Estonian writer
- Raimond Kolk (1924–1992), Estonian writer and critic
- Raimond Lis (1888–1916), French gymnast
- Raimond Valgre (1913–1949), Estonian composer and musician

== Surname ==
- Isabelle Raimond-Pavero (born 23 February 1961) is a French politician
- Jean Jacques Raimond, Jr. (1903–1961), Dutch astronomer
- Jean-Bernard Raimond (1926–2016), French politician
- Jean-Michel Raimond (born 1955), French physicist
- Julien Raimond (1744–1801), Haitian indigo planter

== See also ==
- Raimond-Roger
- Raimund (disambiguation)
- Raymond
- Raymund
