= Mondini =

Mondini is a surname from Northern Italy, especially Lombardy but also Verona and Bologna. It is derived from a shortening of the given name Raimondo ('Raymond'). Notable people with the surname include:

- Fulgenzio Mondini, 17th-century Italian painter
- Gianpaolo Mondini (born 1972), Italian cyclist
- Giorgio Mondini (born 1980), Swiss racing driver
- Luca Mondini (born 1970), Italian footballer
- Stefano Mondini (born 1987), Italian footballer

== See also ==
- Franco Mondini-Ruiz (born 1961), American artist
- Mondini dysplasia, inner ear abnormality
- Mondina
- Mondino
