= Jacopo Berengario da Carpi =

Italian physician

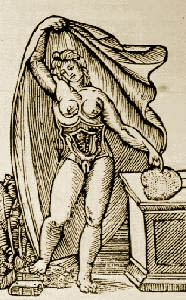
Anatomical plate by Jacopo Berengario da Carpi depicting a pregnant woman with opened uterus

Jacopo Berengario da Carpi (also known as Jacobus Berengarius Carpensis, Jacopo Barigazzi, Giacomo Berengario da Carpi or simply Carpus; c. 1460 – c. 1530) was an Italian physician. His book "Isagoge breves" published in 1522 made him the most important anatomist before Andreas Vesalius.

== Early years ==
Jacopo Berengario da Carpi was the son of a surgeon. As a youth he assisted his father in surgical work, and his surgical skills became the basis of his later work as a physician. In his late teens, through the association of his family with Lionello Pio, Berengario came under the tutelage of the great humanist printer, Aldo Manuzio who came to Carpi to tutor Alberto III Pio and apparently included Berengario in his instruction. In the 1480s, Berengario attended university in Bologna receiving his degree in medicine in 1489.

== Fame through mercury cure for syphilis ==
After obtaining his degree, Berengario returned to his father and assisted him with his surgery practice for a short time, but the influx of the "French disease" in 1494 provided Berengario with a chance to advance his career as a physician. Traveling to Rome, he treated several patients who suffered from the ailment. Judging by an admittedly one-sided account, his work in Rome was a mix of financial success and medical failure. As quoted in Lind's introduction to the Isagoge, Benvenuto Cellini provided a scathing account of Berengario's practice of treating syphilis with doses of mercury while charging "hundreds of crowns" paid in advance. Berengario apparently developed enough of a reputation that the Pope invited him into his service, but he turned down the offer and left Rome shortly thereafter.

== Anatomy in Bologna ==
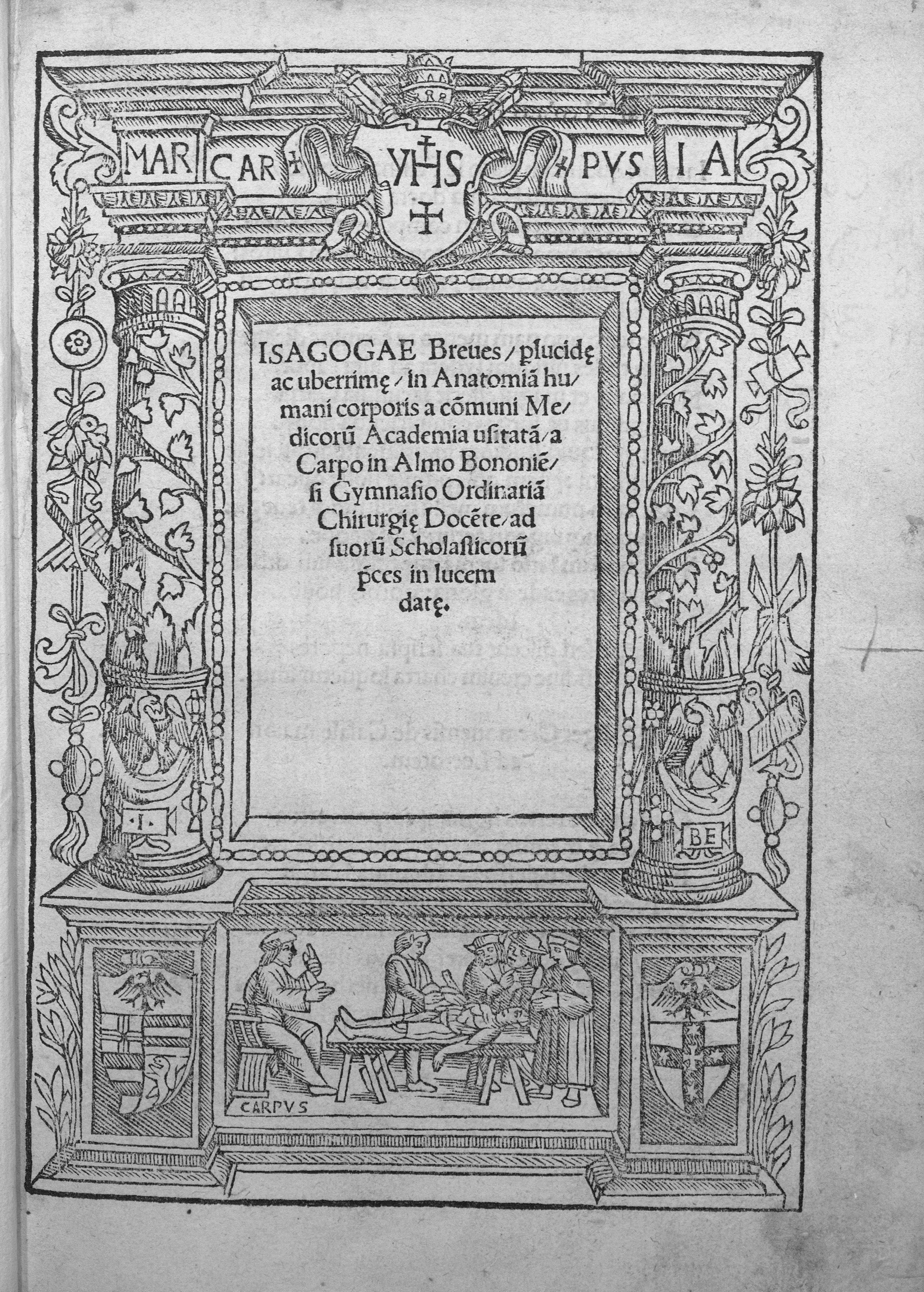
Isagogae

Shortly after his work in Rome, he was appointed Maestro nello Studio at Bologna, a university whose faculty were only rarely foreign and then only when they were scholars of considerable reputations. Berengario’s reputation and personal connections with powerful patrons were indeed quite strong. In 1504, the Pope granted him Bolognese citizenship, and he was asked to treat distinguished patients on several occasions including Alessandro Soderini (relative of a Cardinal and part of the Medici family) in 1513 and Lorenzo de' Medici, Duke of Urbino in 1517. Along with his reputation, Berengario increased his wealth becoming a collector of a variety of artworks including a Roman statue, a painting attributed to Raphael and a pair of vases by Cellini and eventually a house large enough to hold them all.

By all accounts, Berengario was both a popular teacher and an accomplished cultivator of powerful friends. Official university records indicate his success as a teacher over one of his colleagues. He was adept enough at diplomacy to be made court surgeon to the Duke of Ferrara in 1529 after leaving Bologna despite having been condemned to pay a fine or have his nose cut off in 1500 for speaking insultingly of that ducal court. Berengario’s personality is commonly characterized by citing his tendency to violent confrontation. In 1511, he attacked and robbed a stipendiary of the Pope. Also in 1511, he attacked a doctor who sought refuge in a nearby house. The wife of the owner of the house was injured in the process. In 1520, for reasons not quite clear, Berengario along with an entourage attacked the home of Zambelli Petenghi with the intention of taking possession of it and killing its owner. Unable to gain entry, he was forced to content himself with doing damage to the house instead. Apparently due to his personal connections, he remained unpunished for any of his misdeeds.

== Legacy ==
Berengario’s publishing record began in 1514 with an edition of Mondino. In 1518 he published his De fractura cranei and in 1521 his Commentary on Mondino. The Commentary was then supplemented by the Isagogae Breves in 1522 which was a greatly condensed version of the same work “for the common use of all good men”.

Berengario made several important advances in anatomy including the first anatomical text augmented by illustrations, "Anatomia Carpi. Isagoge breves perlucide ac uberime, in Anatomiam humani corporis". This book emphasized the sensory over textual versions of the truth, an emphasis on dissection of human cadavers, some first denials of Galenic anatomy based on personal experience in dissection, and a preference for dissection of numerous bodies following a specific program of investigation. Whereas other anatomists claimed few actual dissections to their name, in 1522 Berengario da Carpi claimed to have anatomized several hundred bodies. He also denied the existence of Galen's rete mirabile. Later Vesalius claimed he was the first to do so.

== Anthology ==
- Berengario da Carpi, Jacopo (1530). Isagogae breues et exactissimae in anatomia humani corporis. Henricus Sybold.
- Berengario da Carpi, Jacopo (1521). Commentaria cum amplissimis additionibus super Anatomia Mundini.
- Berengario da Carpi, Jacopo (1651). De fractura Cranii, liber aureus. Lugduni Batavorum, ex Officin Joannis Maire.
