= Raymund =

Raymund can be both a given name and surname. Notable people with the name include:

Given name:

- Raymund Fugger (1489–1535), German businessman, Reichsgraf and art collector
- Raymund Hart (1899–1960), senior commander in the Royal Air Force during World War II
- Raymund Havenith (1947–1993), German classical pianist
- Raymund Schwager (1935–2004), Swiss Roman Catholic priest and theologian

Surname:

- Monica Raymund (born 1986), American actress and director

== See also ==
- Raymond
