= Raimund =

Raimund is thought to be a variant of the name Raymond. It is closely related to .

Raimund may refer to:

== People ==
=== Given name ===
- Raimund Abraham (1933–2010), Austrian architect
- Raimund Bethge (born 1947), East German bobsledder
- Raimund Hagelberg (1927–2012), Estonian economist and professor
- Raimund Haser (born 1975), German politician
- Raimund Herincx (1927-2018), British operatic bass baritone
- Raimund Krauth (1952–2012), German footballer
- Raimund Kull (1882–1942), Estonian conductor and composer
- Raimund Hermann Siegfried Moltke (1869–1958), German writer and economist
- Raimund Marasigan (born 1971), Filipino rock musician and record producer
- Raimund Pigneter (20th century), Italian luger
- Raimund von Stillfried (1839-1911), Austrian photographer

=== Surname ===
- Ferdinand Raimund (1790-1836), Austrian actor and dramatist

== Other uses ==
- Raimond, a name, variant spelling of Raimund
- Raimund Theater, a theatre in Vienna, Austria

== See also ==
- Raymund Schwager (1935-2004), Swiss Roman Catholic theologian
