= Mondino =

Mondino is an Italian surname from Cuneo and Turin, originally a shortening of the given name Raimondo ('Raymond').

== People with the name ==
=== Surname ===
- Aldo Mondino (1938–2005), Italian sculptor and painter
- Diana Mondino (born 1958), Argentine economist, academic and politician
- Diego Mondino (born 1994), Argentine footballer
- Eduardo Mondino (born 1958), Argentine journalist and politician
- Jean-Baptiste Mondino (born 1949), French photographer and music video director
- Umberto Mondino (1883–1964), Italian general

=== Given name ===
- Mondino de Luzzi (c. 1270– 1326), Italian physician, anatomist and professor of surgery

== See also ==
- Mondina
- Mondini
