= Remond =

Remond or Rémond is a surname of French origin. Notable people with the surname include:

- Alain Rémond (born 1946), French humor columnist
- Carol Remond, American journalist
- Charles Lenox Remond (1810–1873), American orator, abolitionist, and military organizer
- Jacques Rémond (born 1948), French former footballer
- Cristina Rémond, Canadian beauty queen
- Remond Willis (born 1985), Canadian football player
- René Rémond (1918–2007), French historian and political economist
- Sarah Parker Remond (1826–1894), American physician, lecturer, and abolitionist; sister of Charles
