= Raymond Höptner =

German politician (born 1999)

Member of the Landtag of Rhineland-Palatinate
- Assuming office 18 May 2026
- Succeeding: Anke Simon
- Constituency: Ludwigshafen am Rhein I

Personal details
- Born: 1999 (age 26–27)
- Party: Christian Democratic Union

Raymond Höptner (born 1999) is a German politician who was elected member of the Landtag of Rhineland-Palatinate in 2026. He has served as mayor of Mundenheim since 2024.
