= Raymond Gesteland =

American geneticist

Raymond Gesteland is an American geneticist, currently Distinguished Professor Emeritus at University of Utah. He received his Ph.D. at Harvard University in Biochemistry and his B.S. and M.S. at the University of Wisconsin, also in Biochemistry.
