= Leopoldo Raimondi =

Italian footballer (1938–2020)

Personal information
- Date of birth: March 2, 1938
- Place of birth: Parma, Italy
- Date of death: November 8, 2020 (aged 82)
- Height: 1.73 m (5 ft 8 in)
- Position: Defender

Senior career*
Years	Team	Apps	(Gls)
1956–1959	Parma	42	(0)
1959–1960	Alessandria	9	(0)
1960–1962	Roma	10	(1)
1962–1963	Sambenedettese	29	(0)
1963–1964	Venezia	10	(0)
- * Club domestic league appearances and goals

Leopoldo Raimondi (March 2, 1938 in Parma – November 8, 2020) was an Italian professional football player.

He played for 2 seasons (19 games, 1 goal) in the Serie A for U.S. Alessandria Calcio 1912 and A.S. Roma.
