= Pamela Raymond =

American scientist

Pamela A. Raymond, also published as Pamela Raymond Johns, is an American biologist. She is the Stephen S. Easter Collegiate Professor Emerita at University of Michigan College of Literature, Science, and the Arts.

== Education ==
Raymond earned a B.S., M.S., and Ph.D. from University of Michigan.

== Career ==
Raymond was a faculty member at Harvard Medical School and Michigan Medicine. She was a visiting professor at University of Lausanne, University of Utah, and University of California, San Francisco. Raymond was a professor of molecular, cellular, and developmental biology at University of Michigan College of Literature, Science, and the Arts. Raymond's lab investigated the molecular bases of cell signaling regulating retina neurogenesis and neuronal specificity. Her lab uses zebrafish as a genetic model to research retinal stem cells. From 1997 to 2002, Raymond was the associate provost for academic and faculty affairs at University of Michigan. From 2008 to 2014, she was department chair of Molecular, Cellular, and Developmental Biology. Raymond retired on July 1, 2017. Post-retirement, she has been an advocate for equality, diversity, and outreach in STEM.
