= Raimondo (surname) =

Raimondo is an Italian surname. Notable people with the surname include:

- Antonio Raimondo (born 2004), Italian football forward
- Gina Raimondo (born 1971), American politician and Secretary of Commerce under the Biden administration
- Justin Raimondo (1951–2019), American author and the editorial director of the website Antiwar
- Miguel Ángel Raimondo (born 1943), Argentine football midfielder
- Saverio Raimondo (born 1984), Italian actor and comedian

== See also ==
- Raimondi (surname)
- Raimondo
