= Edoardo Raimondi =

Italian painter

Edoardo Raimondi (Parma, July 26, 1837 - Reggio, April 12, 1919) was an Italian painter, known for landscapes and genre subjects.

== Biography ==
He was the son of the painter Carlo Raimondi, and a resident of Reggio, in Emilia. He either trained or was strongly influenced by Antonio Fontanesi, and exhibited frequently in Turin in the 1880s.

At the 1872 Mostra in Milan, he exhibited a studio "dal vero" depicting: Il viatico nei dintorni di Parma: and I mandriani. In 1877 at Naples, he exhibited Rivierschi del Po fuggenti dall' inondazione del Decembre 1872 and Le raccoglitrici di cicoria. In 1881 at Milan, he exhibited: Capraio; Giovane porcaro, and Le rive del Po. In 1883 at Rome, he displayed: Un mattino d'Ottobre sulle rive del Po and In attesa del treno. In 1884 at Turin, he exhibited paintings depicting scenes of the Running of the Bulls in Pamplona, and a canvas depicting Fisherman in the Lago di Bieva (Lake Biwa in Japan. In 1886 at the Mostra of Livorno, he exhibited: Bandiera nera in vedetta, (Scene in the War of Tonkin), and Vecchio parco. Other works include Entrata del toro a la vara; Ricordi di San Rossore; Passaggio lombardo, Pianura, and Boscaglia. He completed the battle paintings: Ulani austriaci annientati dall’artiglieria italiana a Villafranca (Battle of Custoza (1866)) and Prince Amedeo ferito a Monte Croce, now found in the Pinacoteca Stuard of Parma. In 1864, he also painted some orientalist canvases, including I Turcos a Robecchetto, La Quiete, and Costumi del Cairo.
