= Alexandre Raymond =

Constantinople-born French architectural historian

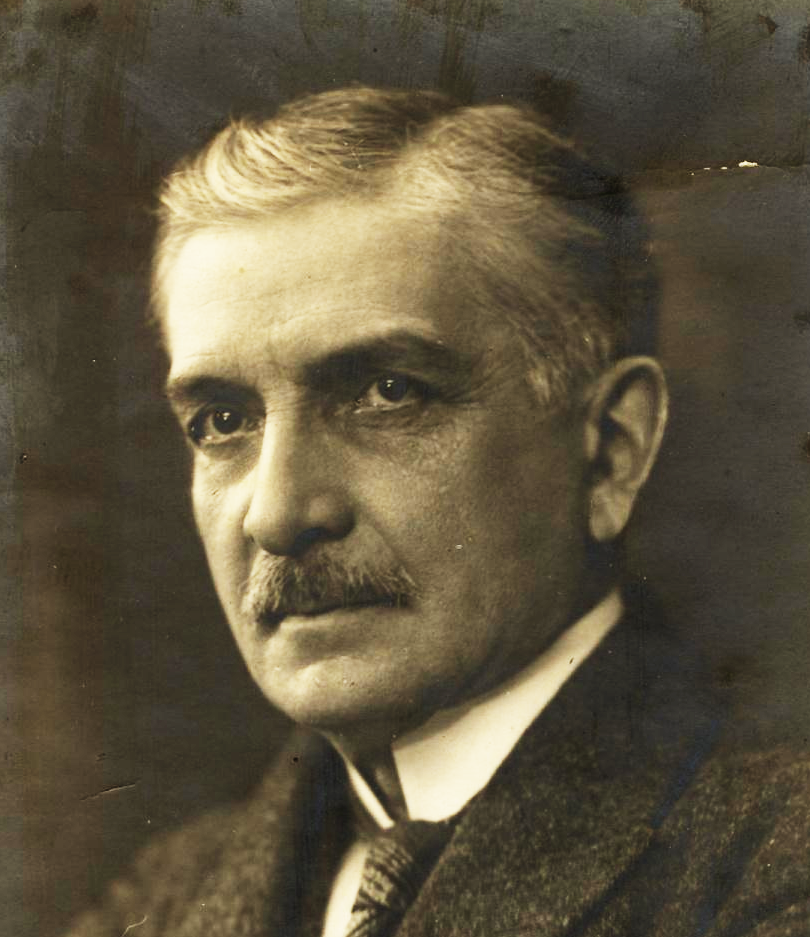
- Born: 22 January 1872; Constantinople, Ottoman Empire
- Died: 16 May 1941 (aged 69); Nanterre, France
- Occupations: Architect, artist, cartographer, writer, illustrator
- Years active: 1900–1940
- Notable work: L'Art Islamique en Orient, La Basilique d'Ayia-Sophia de Constantinople, Théodora de Byzance (Islamic Art in the East, The Basilica of Ayia-Sophia of Constantinople, Theodora of Byzantium)

Signature
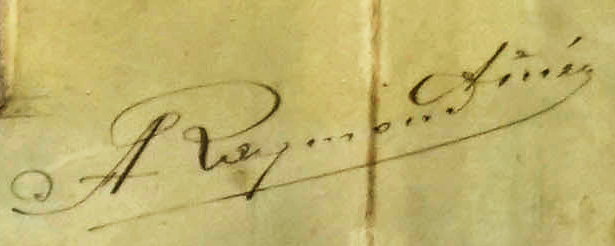

Alexandre Marc Raymond (22 January 1872 – 16 May 1941) was a French Orientalist architect and artist. After working in Islamic art, he turned to Byzantine art. During the last twenty years of his life he undertook substantial work, in particular on Hagia Sophia.

== Biography ==
=== Early life ===
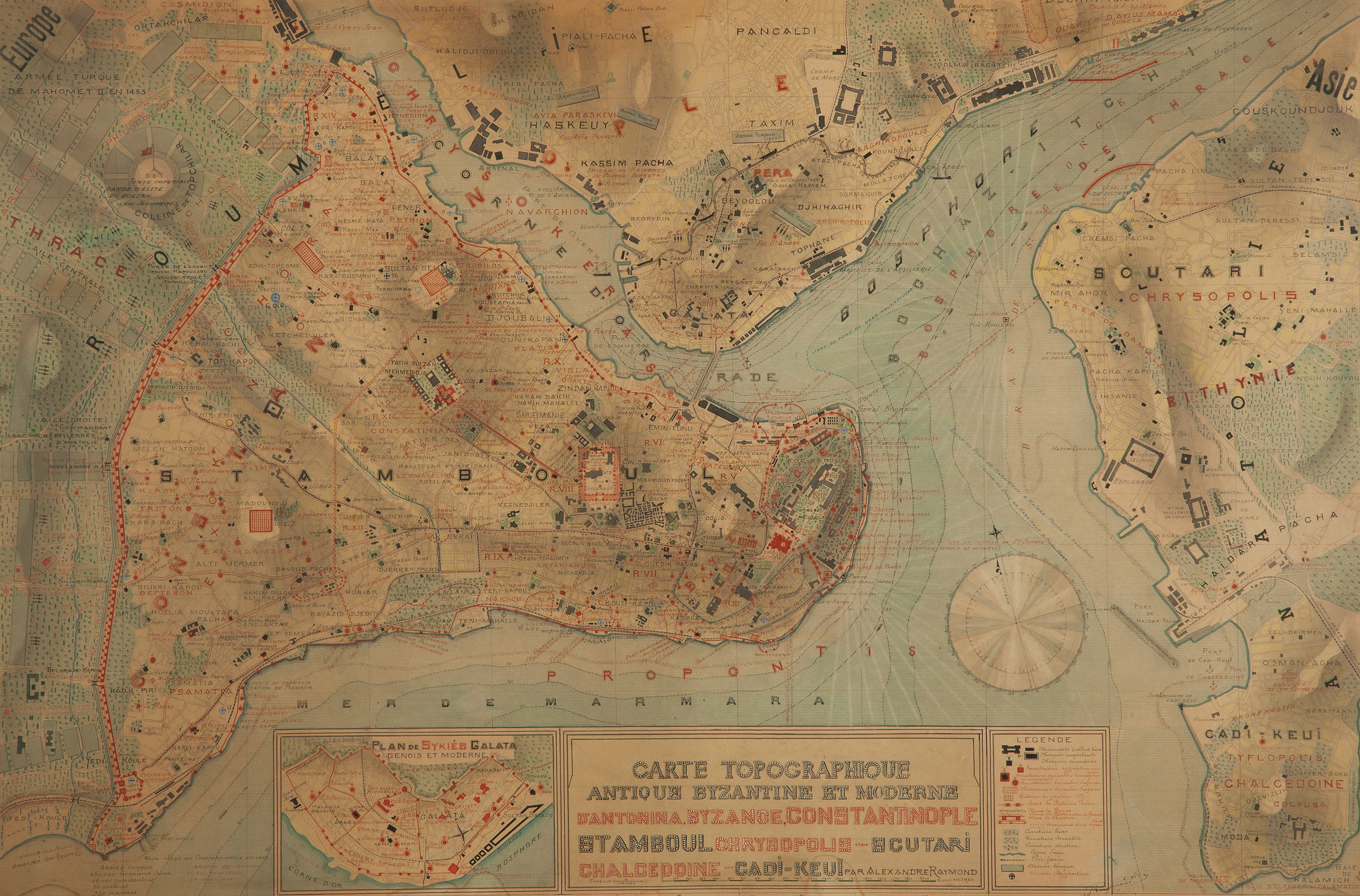
Plan of ancient and modern Constantinople drawn by Alexandre Raymond

Alexandre Marc Raymond was born on 22 January 1872 in Constantinople, in Turkey, then part of the Ottoman Empire. He was the son of Marc Raymond, architect, born in Constantinople in 1846, and Rose Valsamaki, Greek Orthodox, born in Cephalonia.

In 1894, he began studying at Sanayi-i Nefise Mektebi (School of Fine Arts) in Constantinople where he was a student of Alexander Vallaury.

== Ottoman Empire (1893–1922) ==
=== Architecture ===
Between 1888 and 1892, Raymond traveled to ancient cities of Konya, Iznik, Bursa, Yenişehir and made drawings of Islamic architecture.

From 1894, Raymond drew the blueprints for the Bursa Institute of Sericulture, an Ankara agency building – probably that of Régie de Tabac, and an Adapazarı agency building of Régie de Tabac.

In 1908, he published L’Art de la Construction en Turquie (The Art of Construction in Turkey, in French), dealing with the construction market, material and labor conditions, and technical and legal arrangements in the Ottoman Empire at the beginning of the 20th century.

He partnered with his brother César who ran a bookshop, Librairie Raymond, where his written works were sold.

=== Reproductions of religious monuments and adornments ===
Alongside his incoming-generating activity as an architect, from the age of 16 (1888) until 50 (1922), Raymond travelled around the Ottoman Empire and created reproductions of religious monuments and adornments. He also produced several plans of Constantinople.

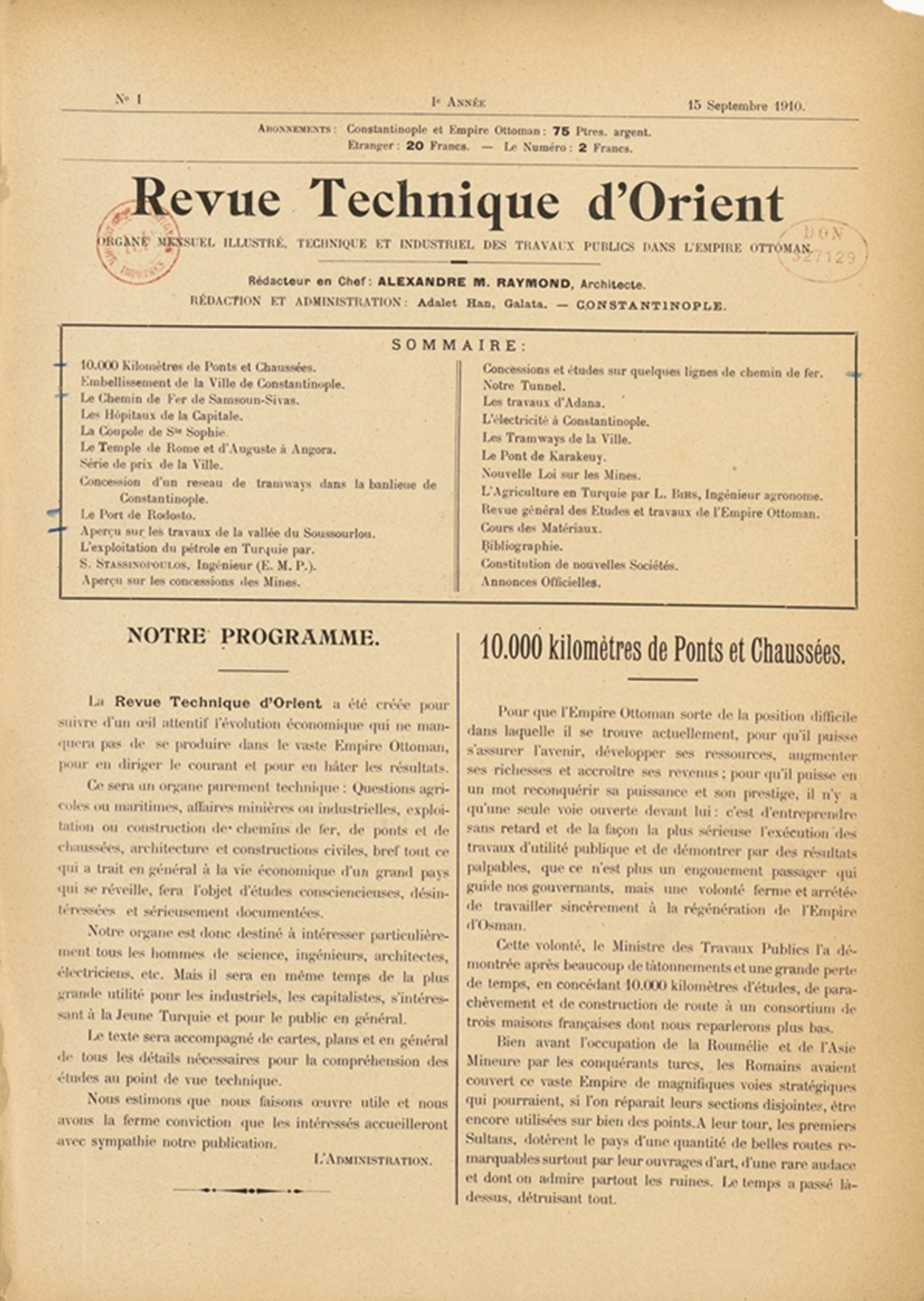
Revue Technique d'Orient

=== Revue Technique d’Orient ===
From 1910 to 1911, Raymond was Editor-in-chief of the Revue Technique d’Orient, a monthly technical journal in French, first published in Constantinople in September 1910. He also edited the periodical Genie Civil Ottoman, where contemporary Ottoman architectural projects were published. It was the journal of the Association des Architectes and Ingenieurs en Turquie, of which Raymond was a founding member in 1913.

=== End of the Ottoman Empire and leaving Constantinople ===
Between 1914 and 1918, the First World War caused the collapse of the Ottoman Empire and the ascent to power of the nationalist Mustafa Kemal Atatürk in Turkey. Greece moved to action to overthrow Mustapha Kemal. The Greco-Turkish War broke out in 1919. The massacres of the Greek population living on Turkish soil compelled Raymond, whose Greek-born wife was threatened, to flee his native city for Europe.

== In France ==
Raymond arrived in Europe in 1922 and settled in Paris in 1927. He nonetheless retained links with the newly formed republic of Turkey, and prepared sketches for Turkey's projected participation in the 1925 International Exposition of Decorative Arts in Paris.

=== L’Art islamique en Orient I, II and III (Islamic Art in the East I, II and III) ===
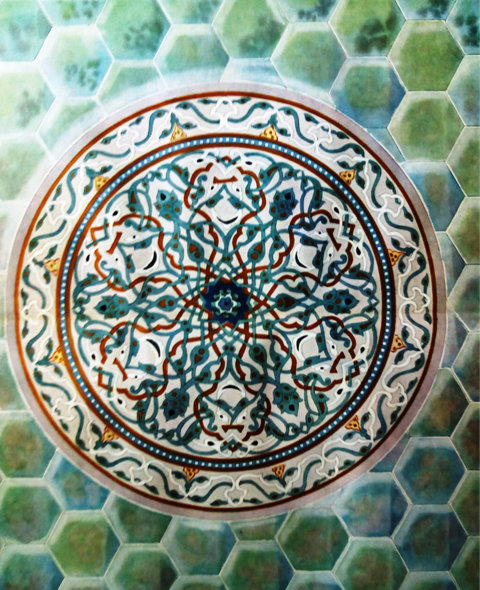
L'Art Islamique en Orient 1

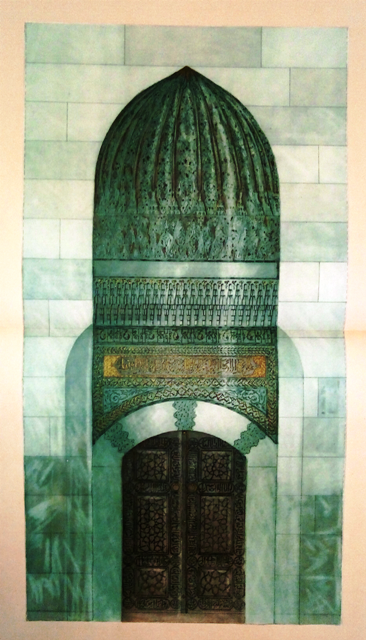
Portail du Mausolé de Tchélébi Sultan à Brousse (1421)

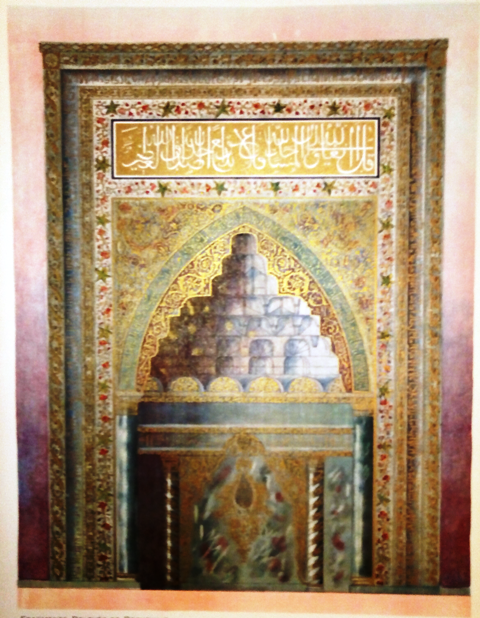
Mirhrab de la Mosquée à Brousse

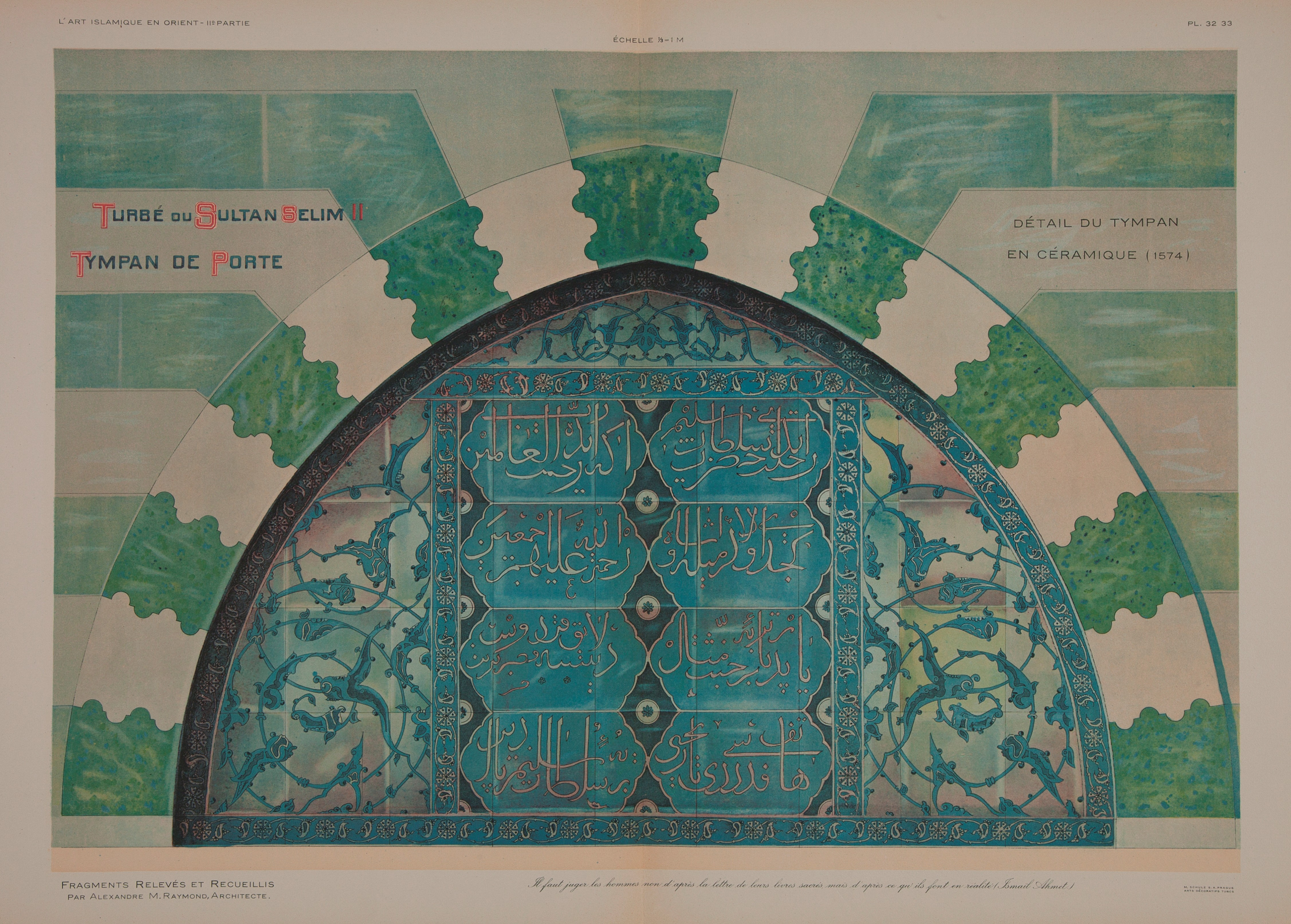
Turbé du Sultan Sélim II

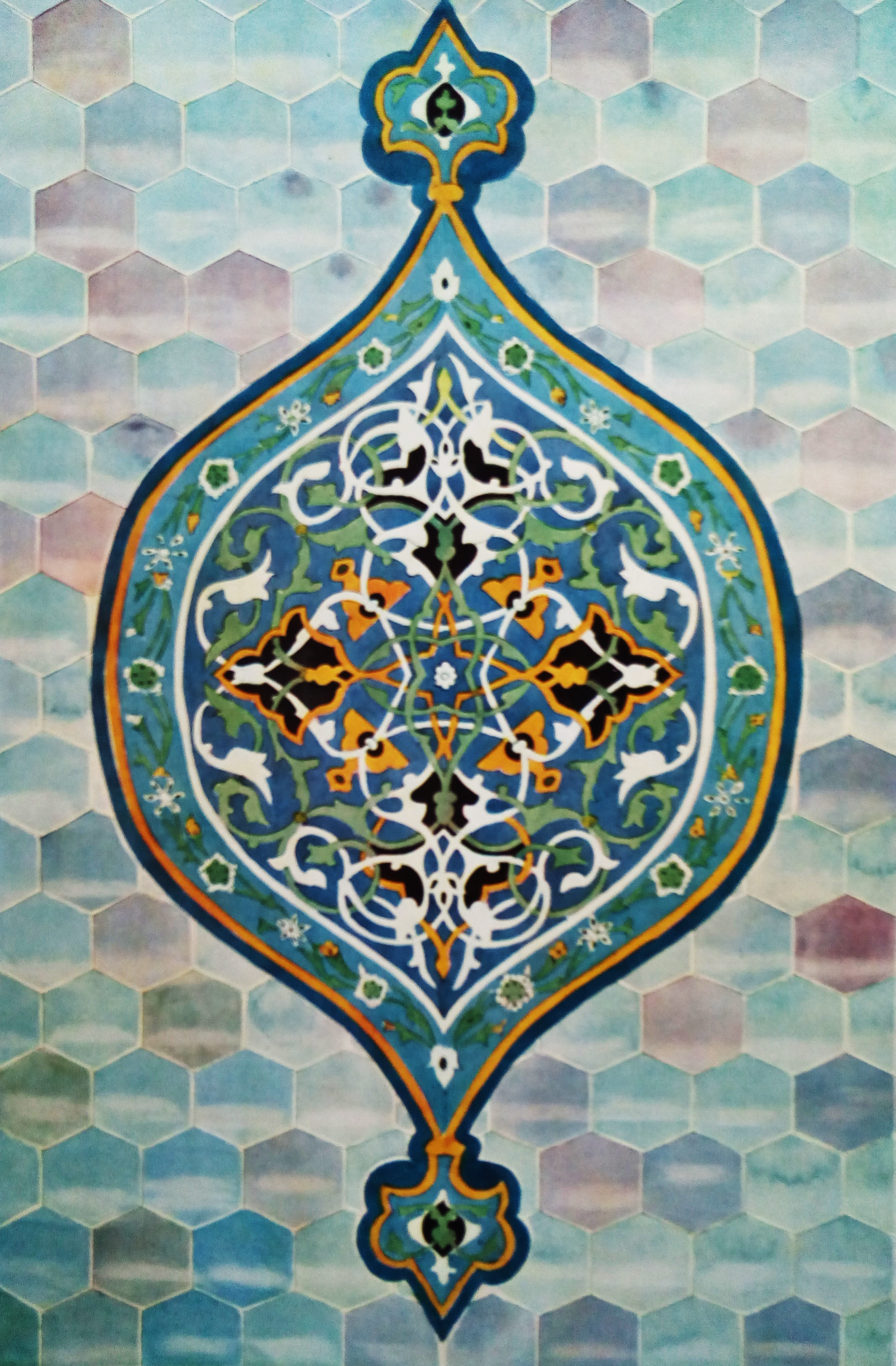
Turbé du Sultan Mohamed 1

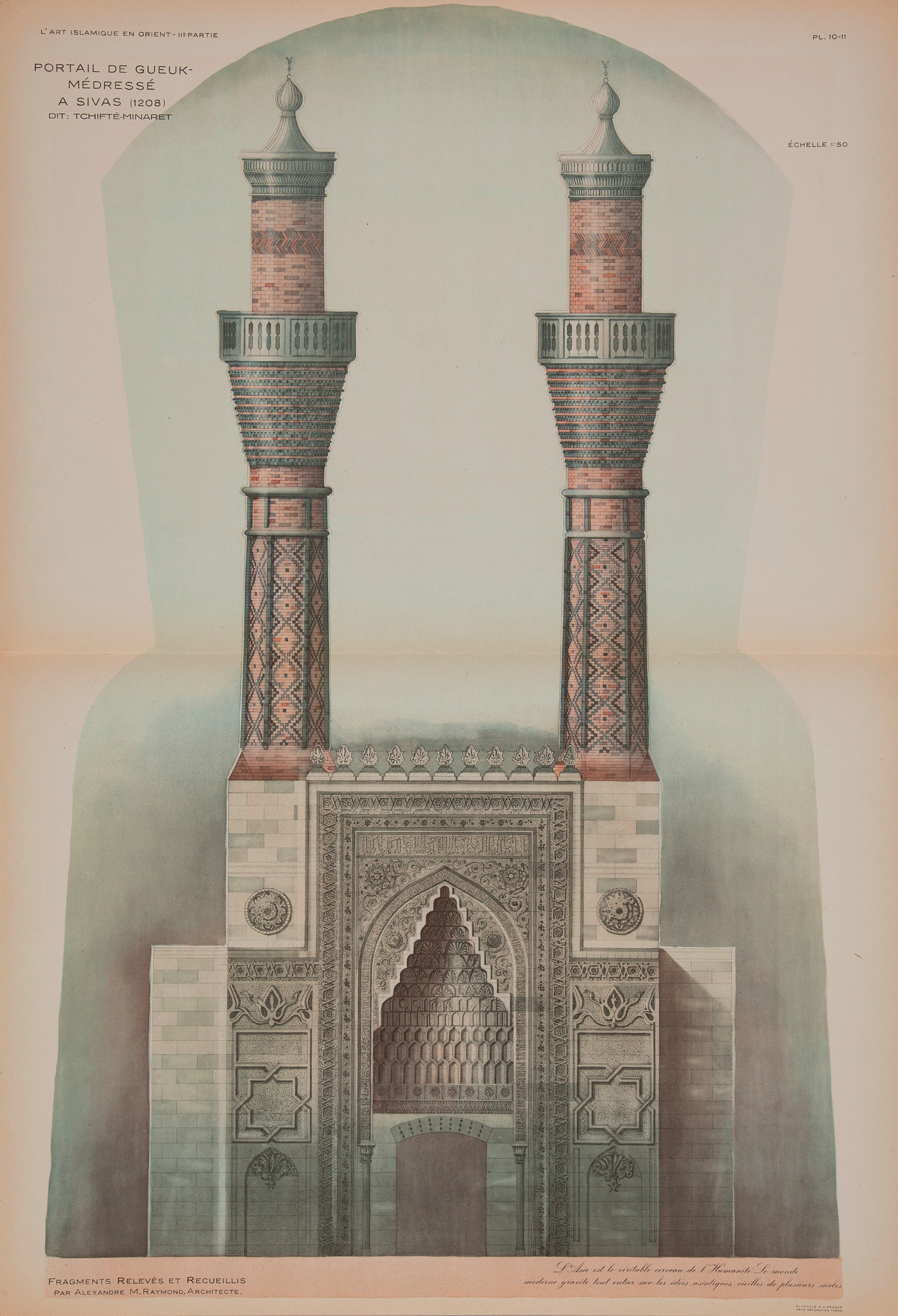
Portail de Geuk-Médréssé à Sivas dit Tchifté Minaret,

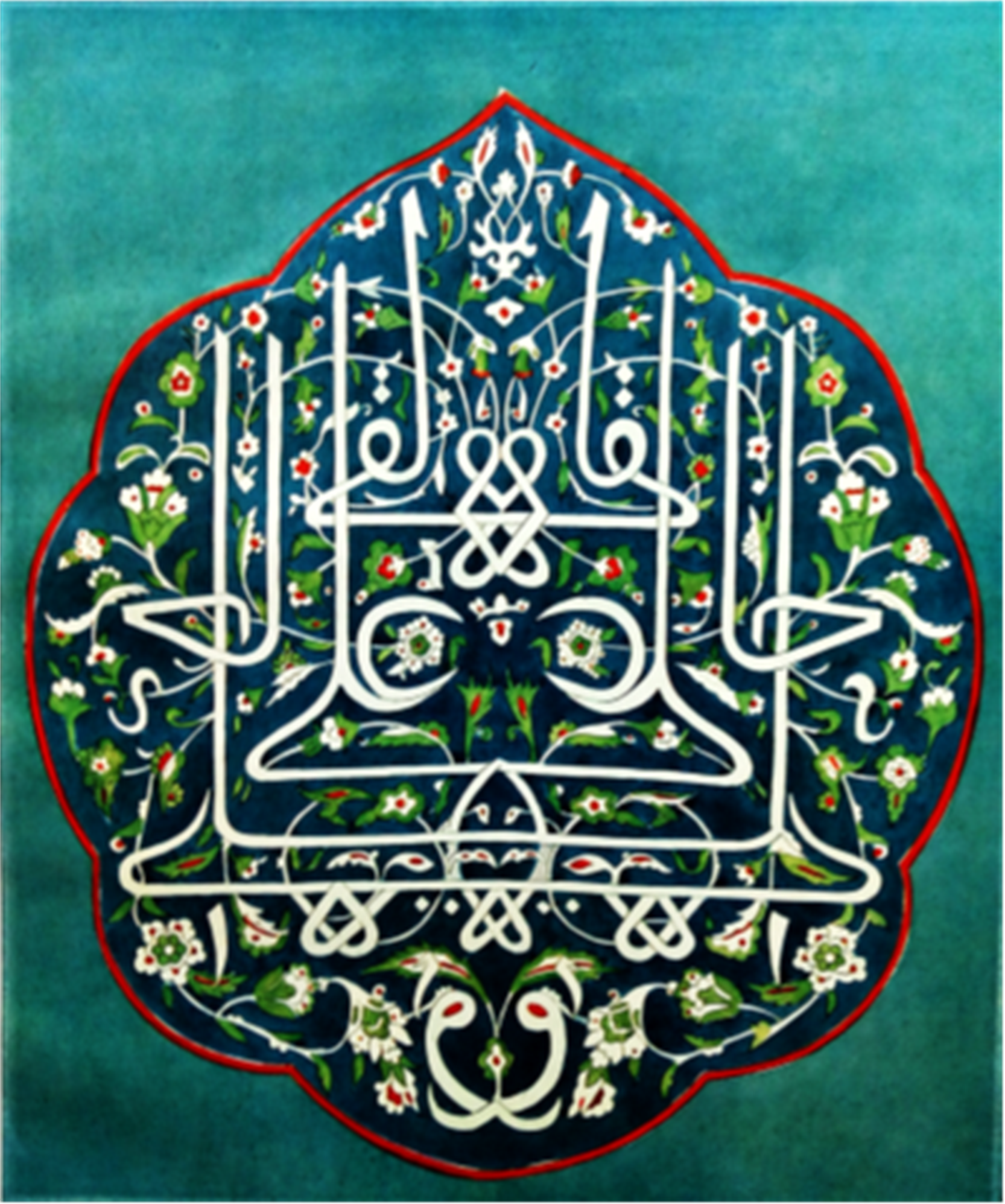
Echraf-Zad Pacha Djami à Isnik (1619),

In 1922, he worked on publishing the first book of his Islamic art reproductions, Alttürkishe Keramik or L’Art islamique en Orient – Première Partie (Islamic Art in the East – Part One, published in French). In 1923, with the financial backing of American millionaire Charles Crane, he commissioned the printing of L’Art islamique en Orient, Deuxième Partie (Fragments d’architecture religieuse et civile) (Islamic Art in the East, Part Two (Fragments of Religious and Civil Architecture)) and L’Art islamique en Orient, Troisième Partie (Islamic Art in the East, Part Three), published in French in Prague by the Printing House Schulz.

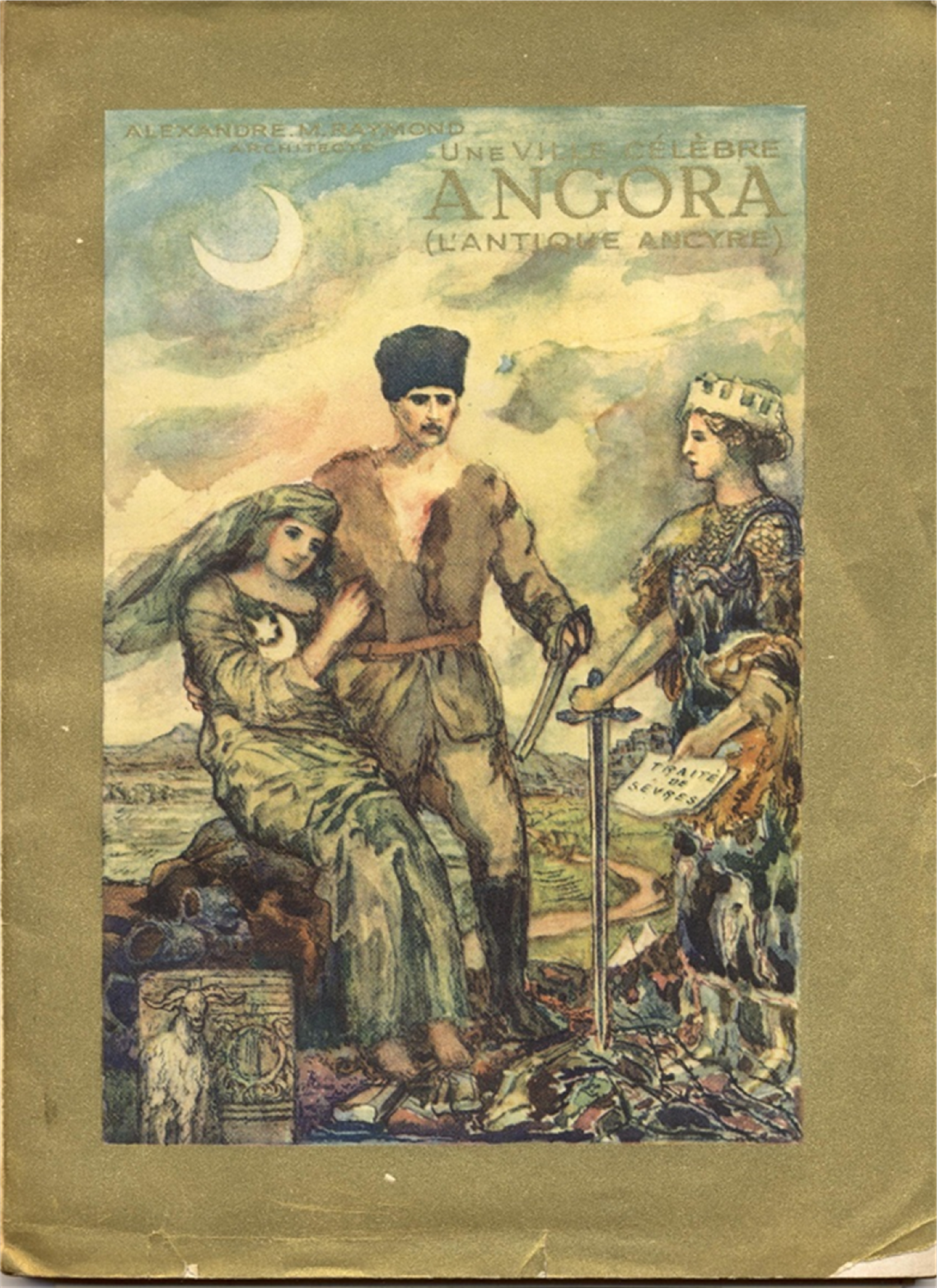
Une ville célèbre l'Angora ou l'antique Acyre (A Famous city Angora or antique Acyra) book cover

== Une ville célèbre, l’Angora ou l’antique Ancyre (A Famous city, the Angora or the Antik Ancyra) ==
In 1923, at the same time as publishing L’Art islamique, Raymond published a volume on the treasures of Turkey, Une ville célèbre, l’Angora ou l’antique Ancyre (A Famous City, Angora or Antique Ancyra) once again with Schulz. It also discusses the history of Ankara. This book is dedicated to the memory of Pierre Loti. The book was reviewed in a 1926 edition of Revue des études byzantines by L. Barral, who called it "abundantly but unevenly illustrated". He praised Raymond's plan of the town of Yeni-Chéir, and twelve plates of the Temple of Augustus and Rome, particularly two where Raymond had "attempted an interesting reconstruction of the same temple transformed into a church".

=== Faïences décoratives de la Vieille Turquie (Decorative Faience in Ancient Turkey) ===
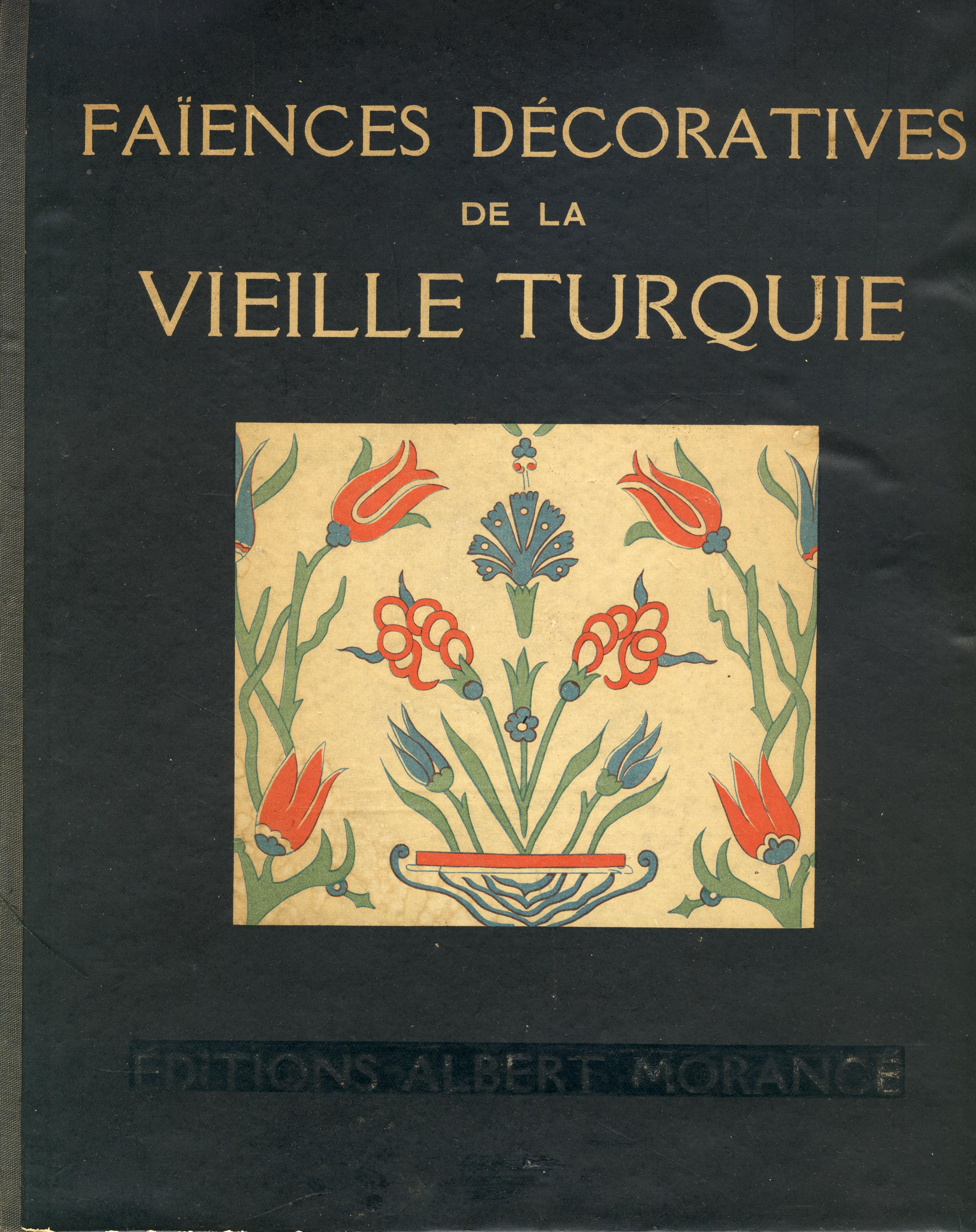
Cover of Faïences Décoratives de la Vieille Turquie (Decorative Faience in Ancient Turkey) 1927

Raymond published Faïences décoratives de la Vieille Turquie (Decorative Faience in Ancient Turkey) through the Paris publisher Albert Morancé; a little book that reproduced some of the plates from L'Art Islamique en Orient and introduced new ones.

== La Basilique d'Αγία Σοφία de Constantinople (The Basilica of Hagia Sophia of Constantinople) ==
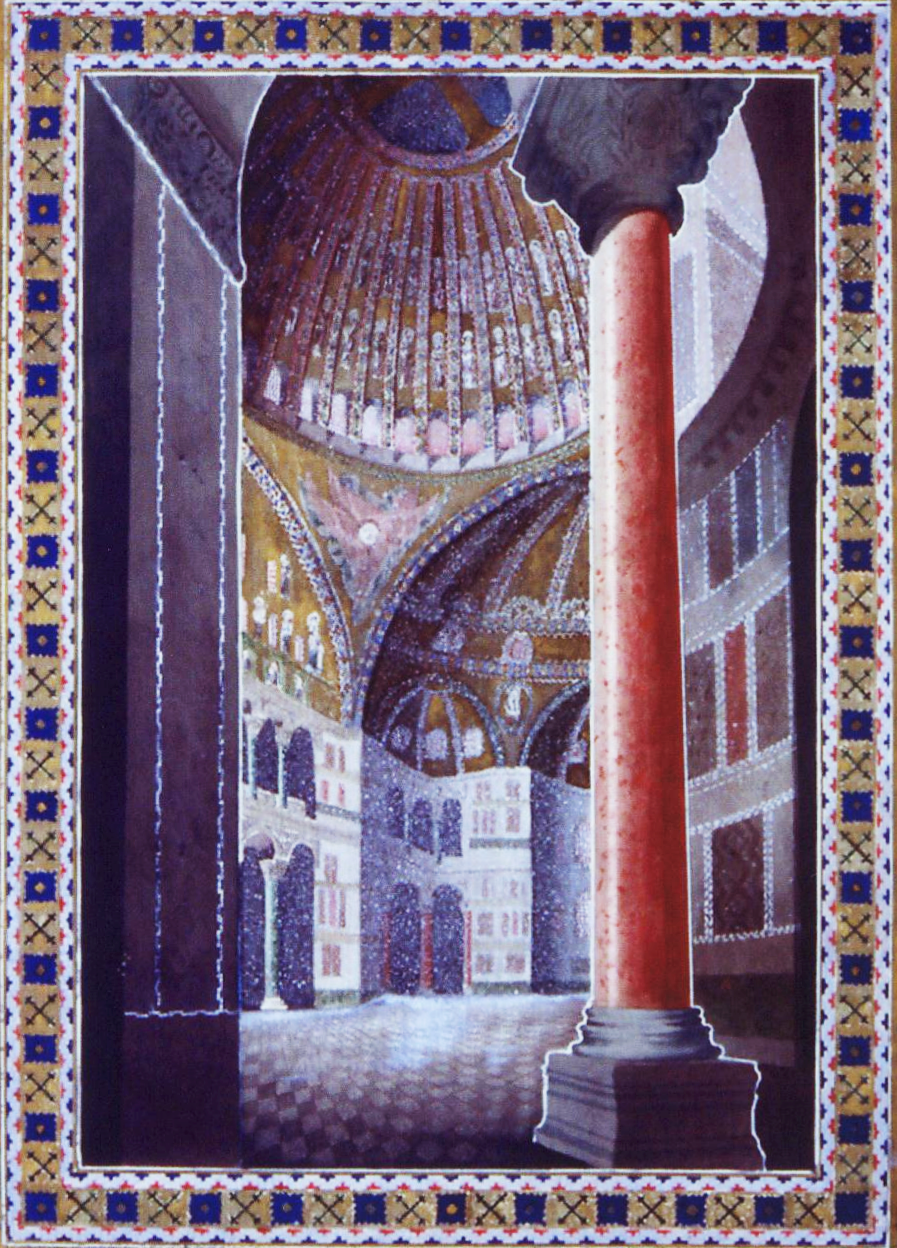
Hagia Sophia – Perspective au Gynécée

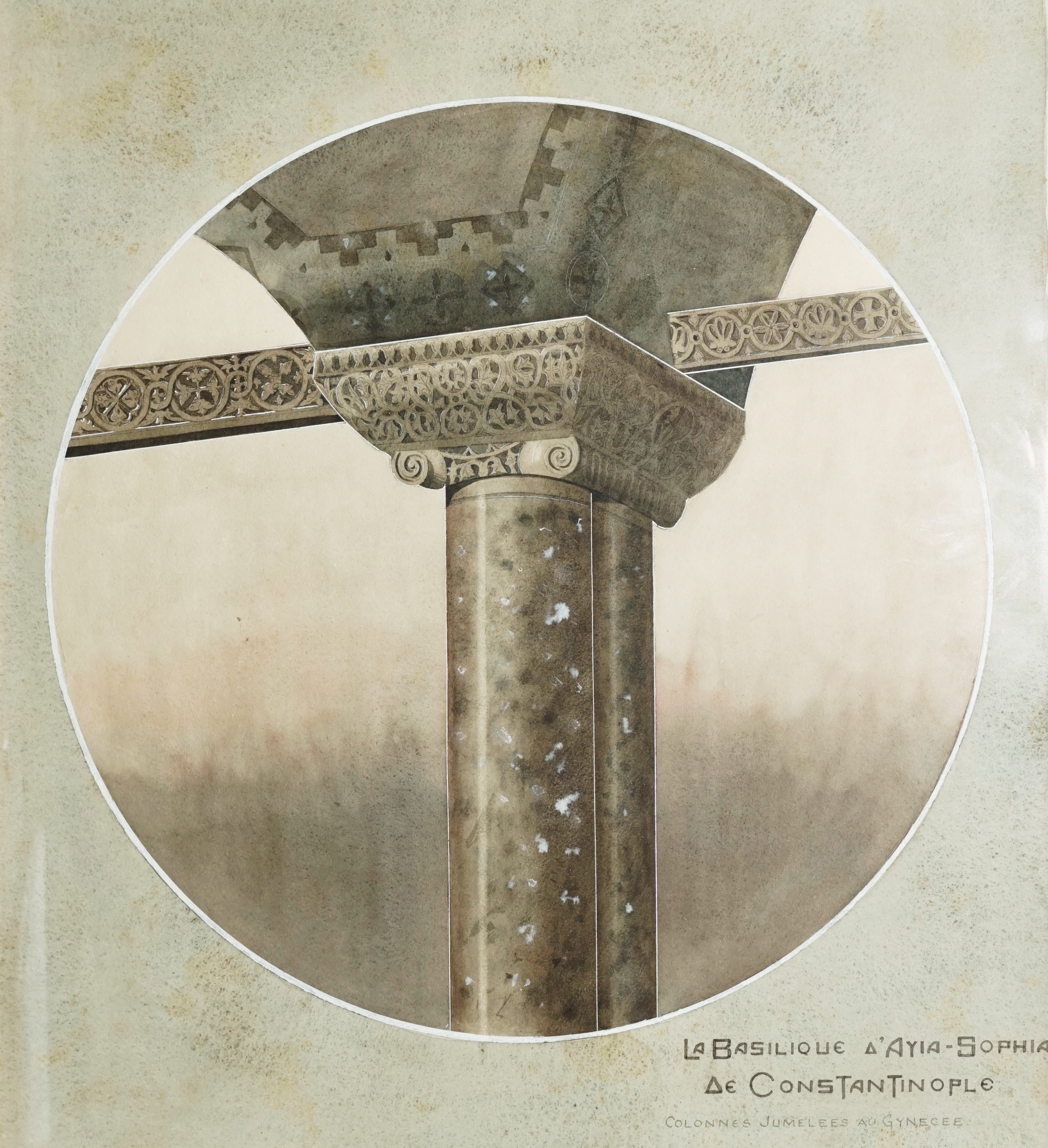
Hagia Sophia – Colonnes jumelées au gynecée

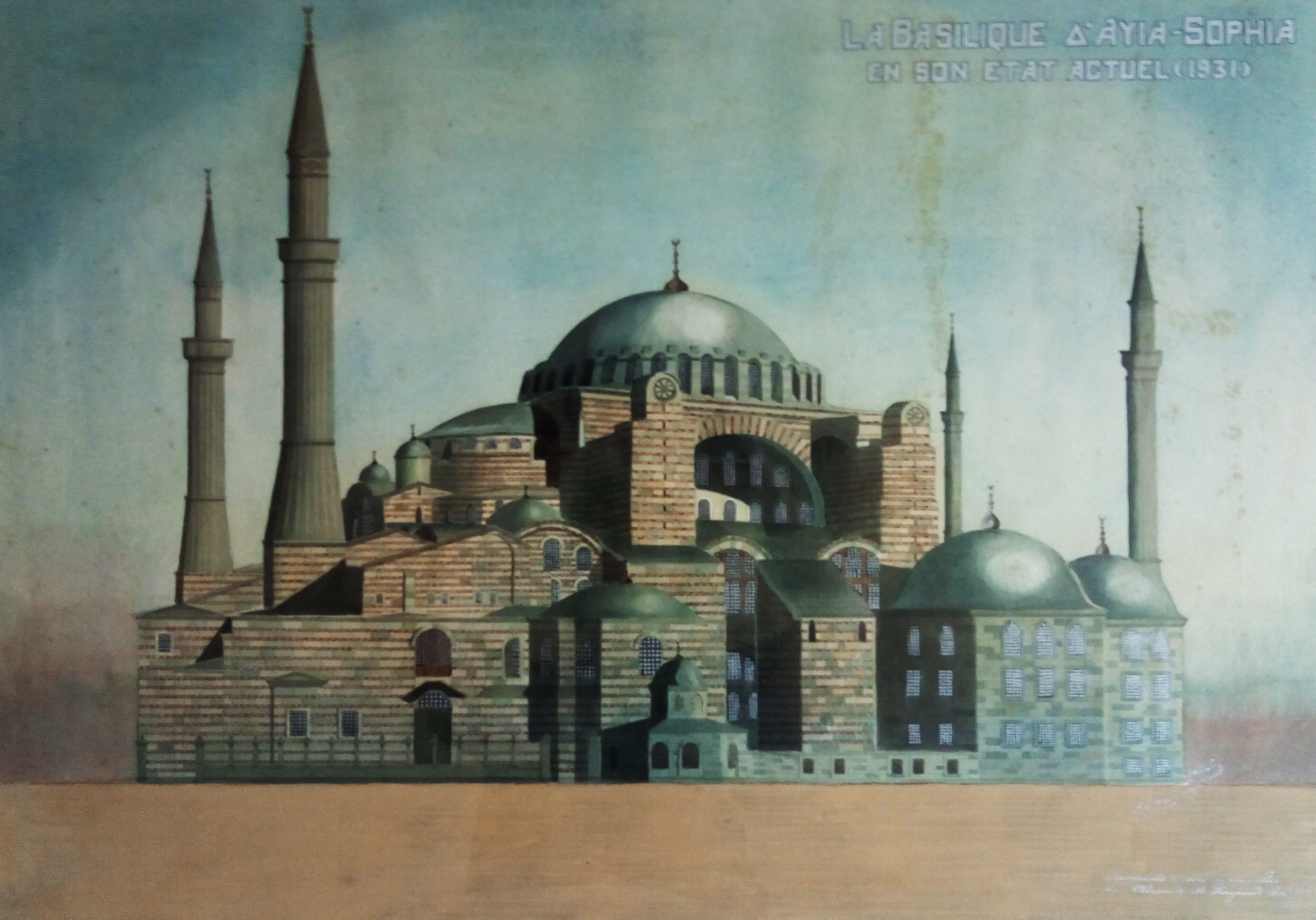
Hagia Sophia – 1931

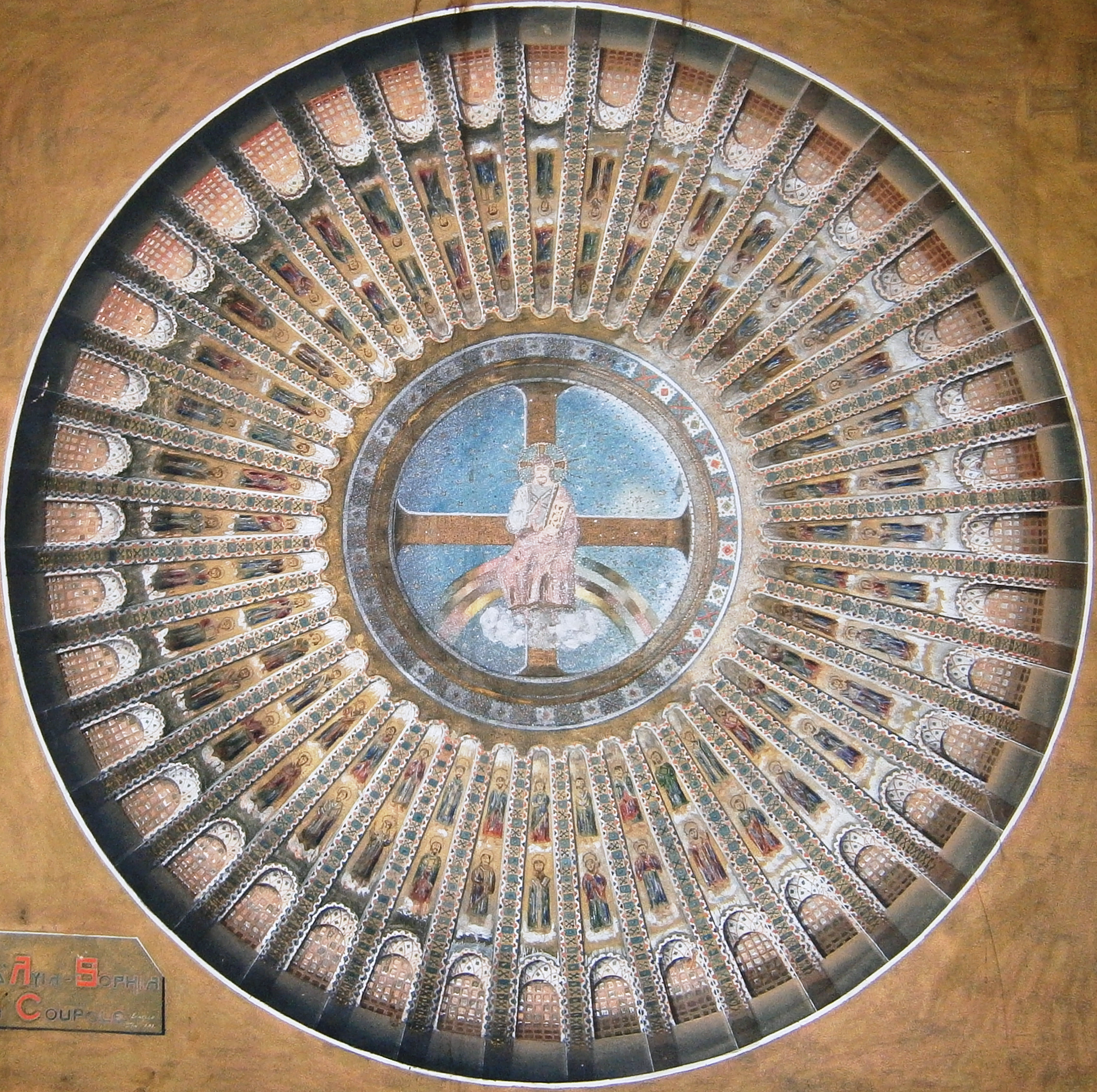
Hagia Sophia – La Coupole – Le Christ Pentocrator

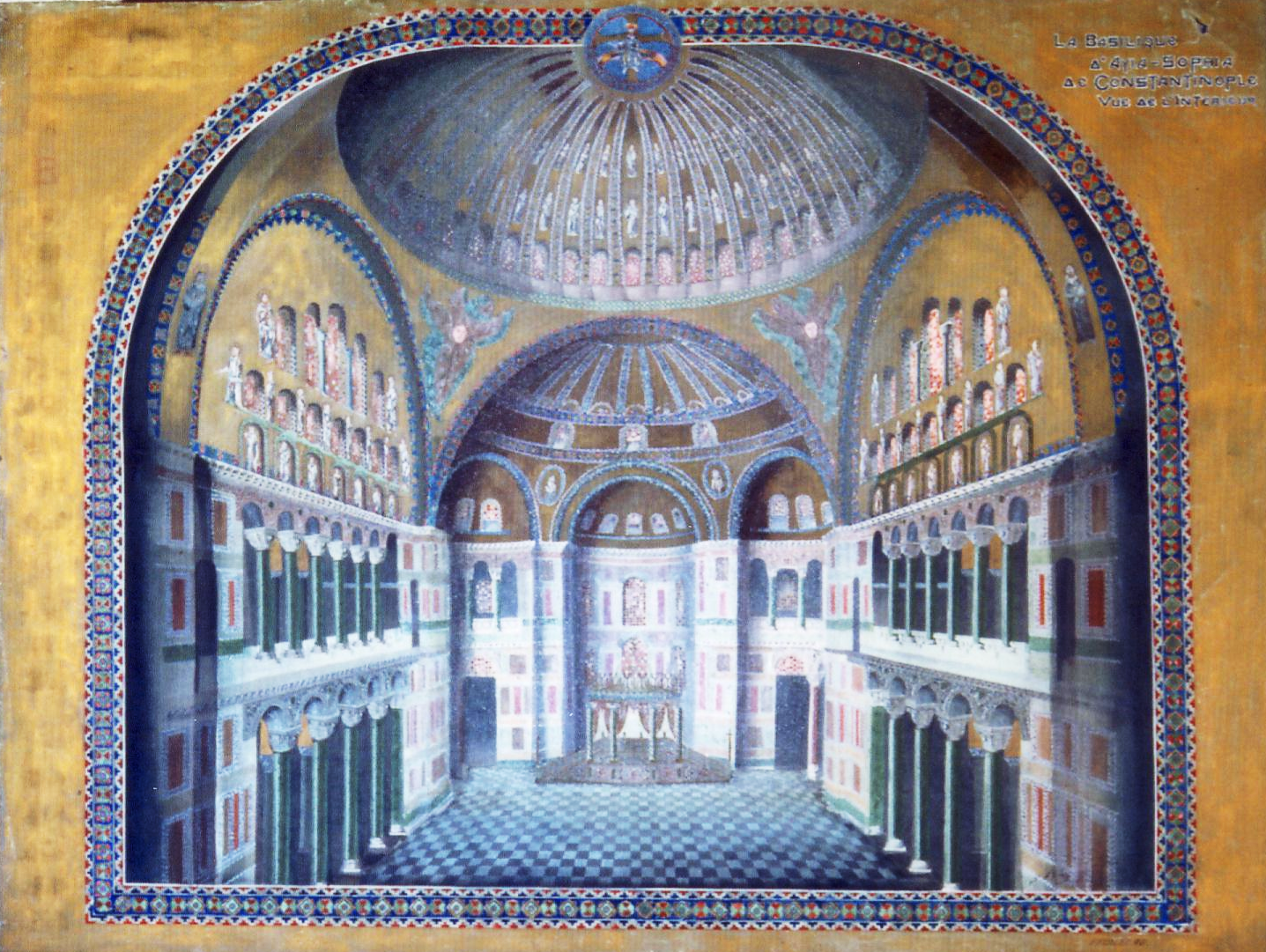
Hagia Sophia – Vue de l'intérieur

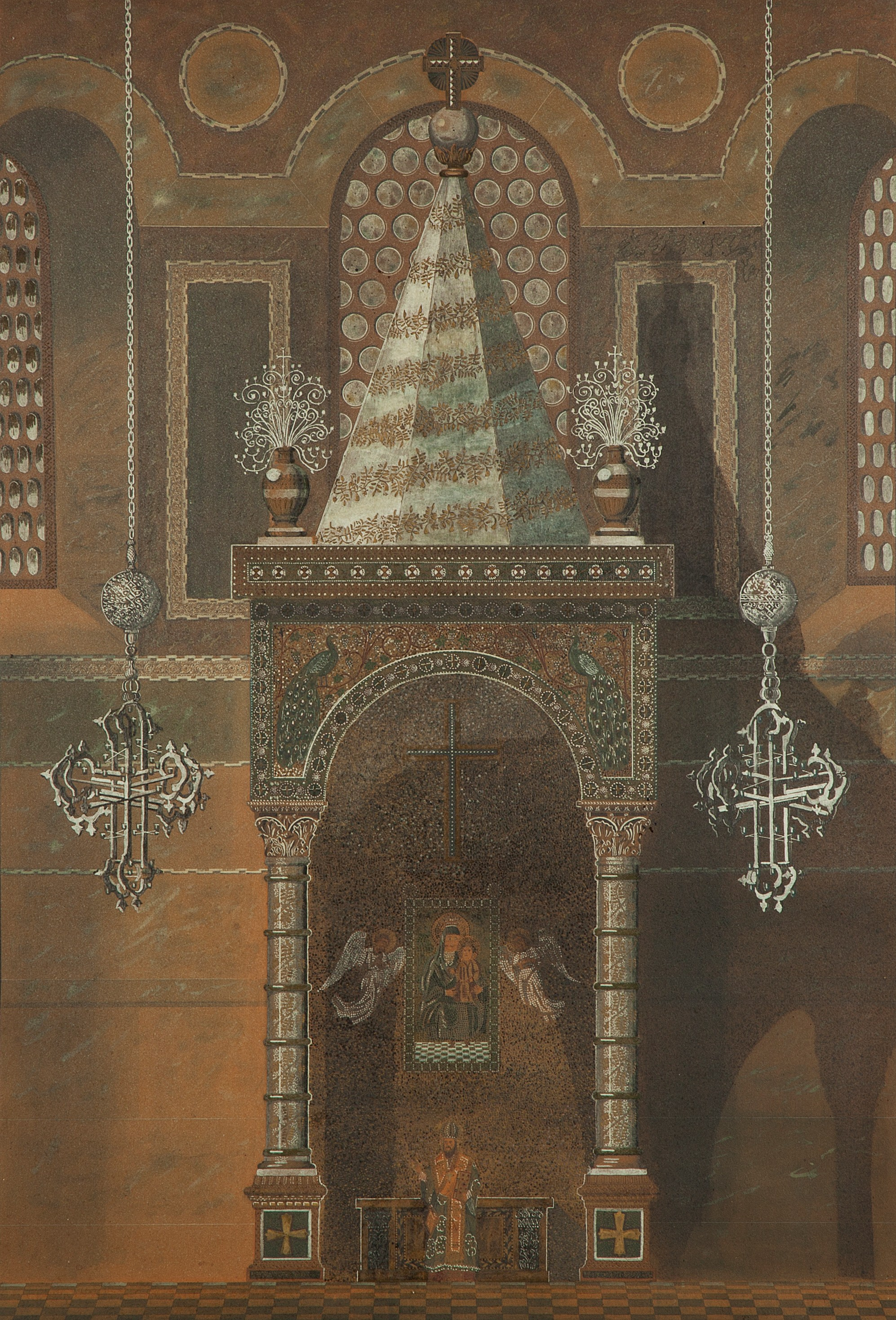
Hagia Sophia – Reconstitution du Yéron

Over the next two years, Raymond worked on a colossal project that he considered to be his life’s work: La Basilique de Sainte Sophie (Αγία Σοφία) de Constantinople (The Basilica of Hagia Sophia of Constantinople). This was published in 1933. He used his knowledge of the monument, the work and notes left by his father, the architect Marc Raymond, and a substantial number of photographs of the inside of the building. The undeniable originality of the drawings (ink, watercolour, gold-leaf and silver paintings) is that they represent Hagia Sophia before the Muslims covered it with lime mosaics. Only one drawing of Hagia Sophia, relating to the period when Alexandre Raymond took on his work, 1931, existed.

The entire work totals some 88 representations of various sizes. The drawings are complemented by the text describing Hagia Sophia (Αγία Σοφία) written by Procopius of Caesarea, the anonymous text of the Holy Wisdom (also known as Holy Sophia, Divine Wisdom), and a historic and descriptive text from the author.

=== La Basilique des Saints-Apôtres (Church of the Holy Apostles) ===
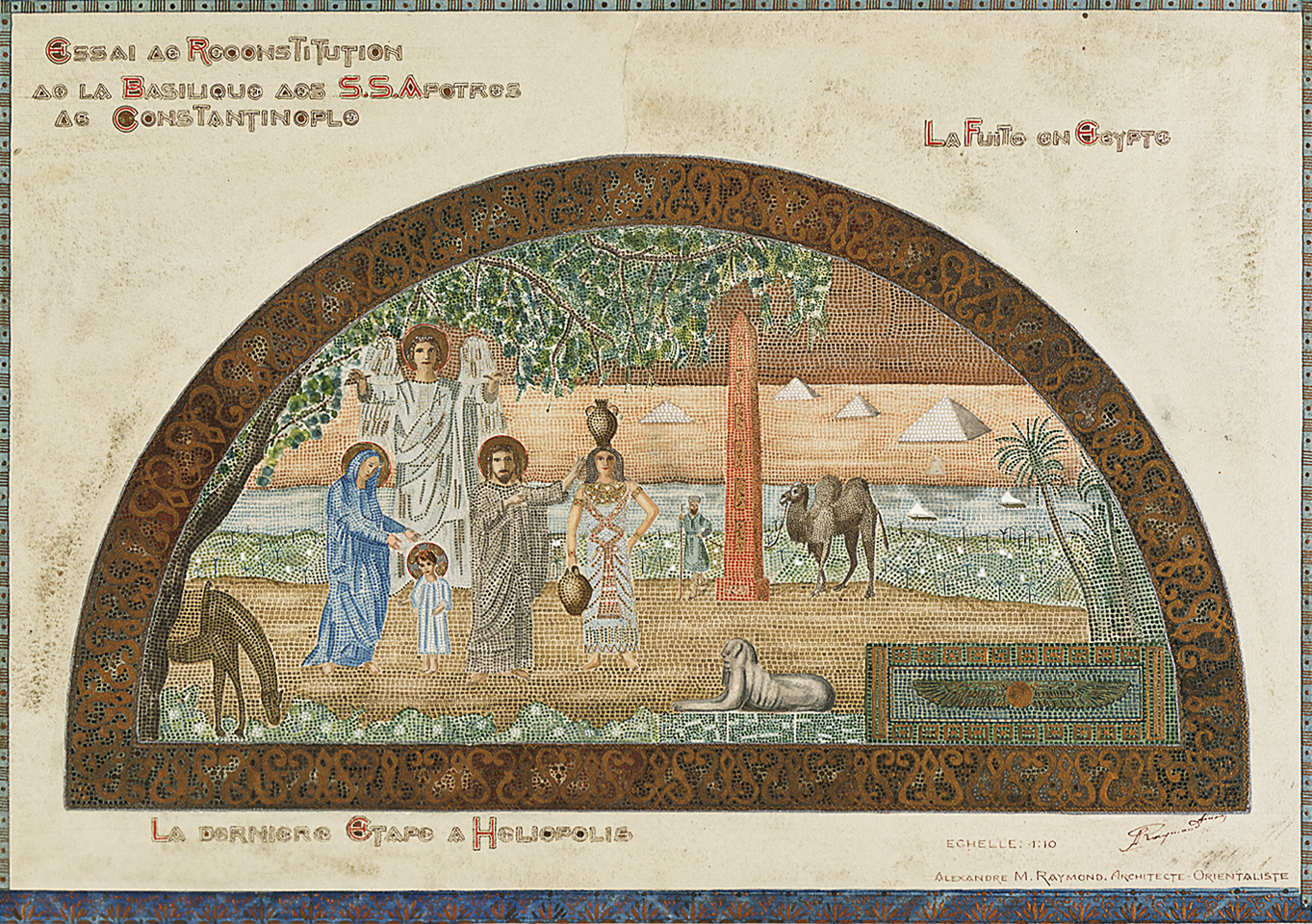
Les Saints-Apôtres – Fuite en Egypte dernière étape

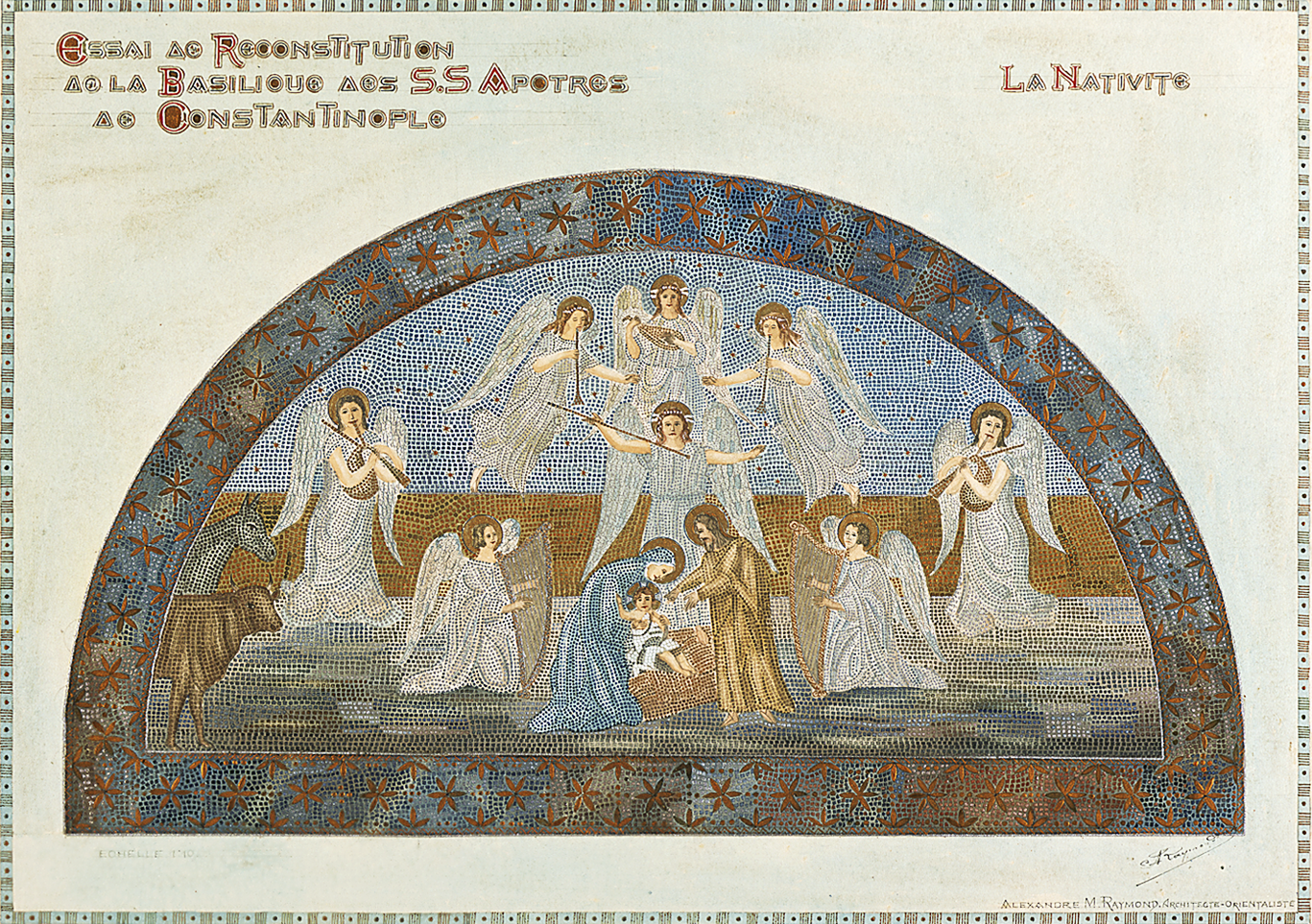
Les Saints-Apôtres – La Nativité

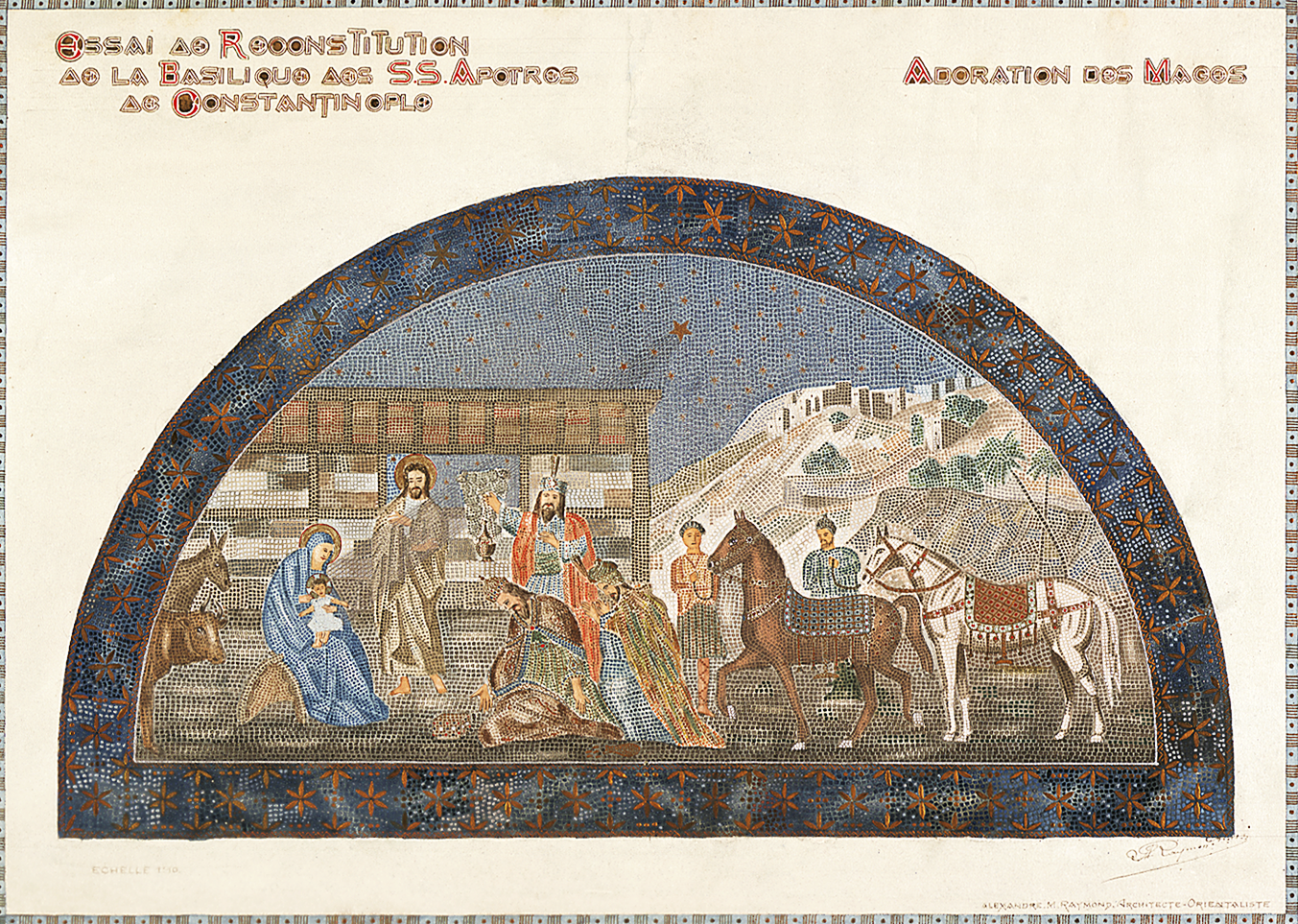
Les Saints-Apôtres – Adoration des Mages

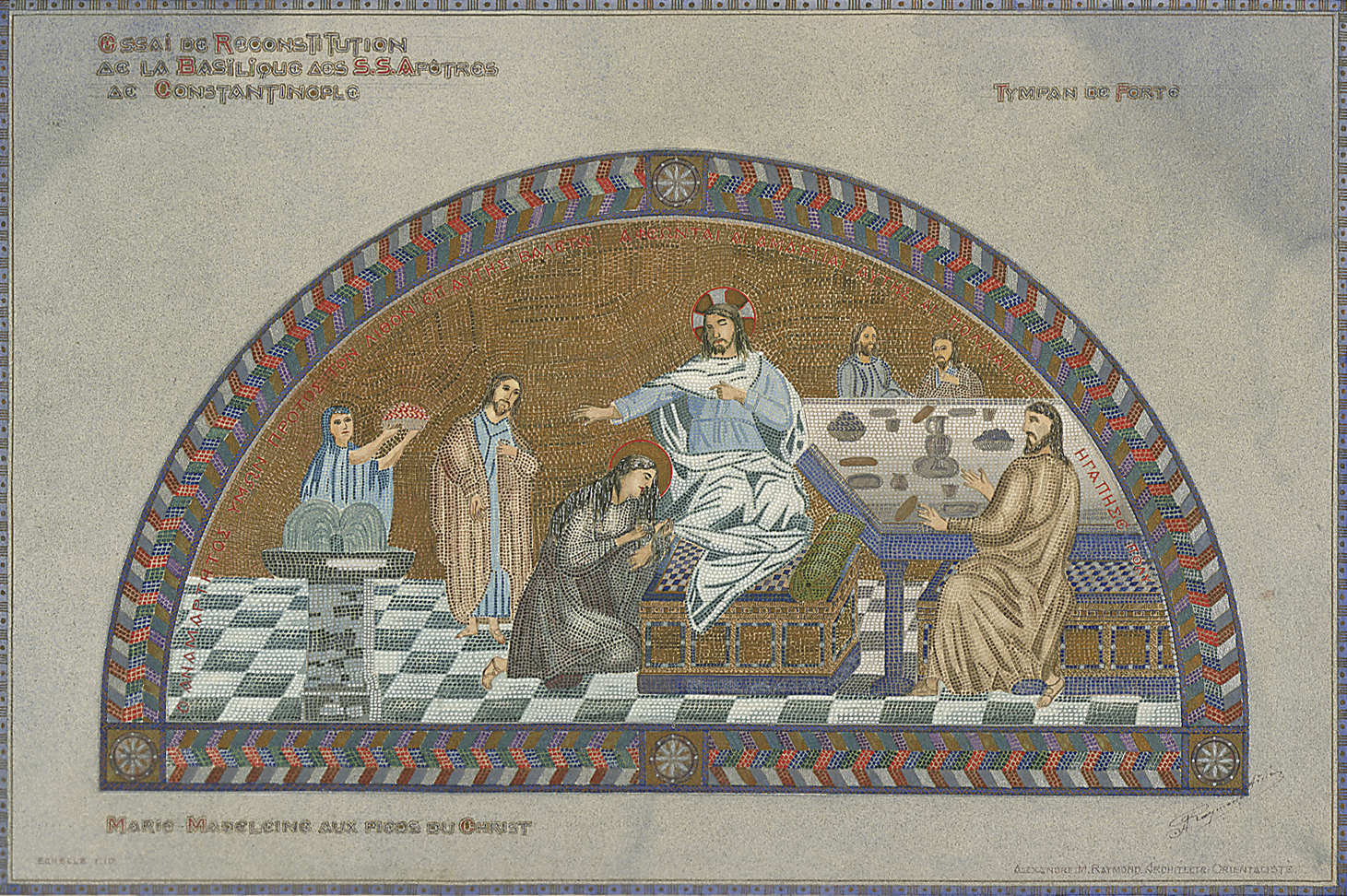
Les Saints-Apôtres – Marie-Madeleine

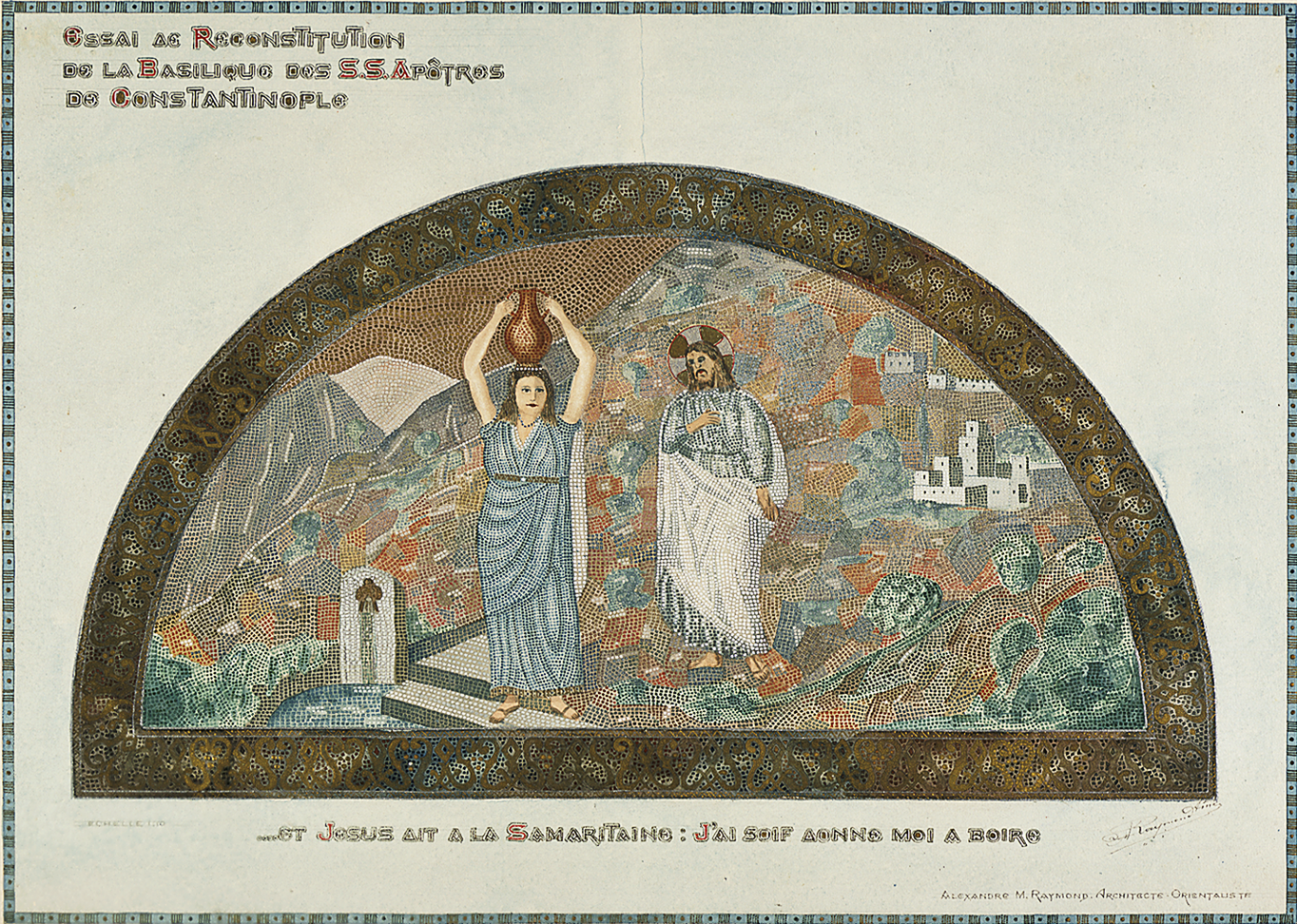
Les Saints-Apôtres – La Samaritaine

Alexandre Raymond became interested in Christian art and developed a technique that required great rigour, which we could call “micro-mosaics”. By drawing from the texts written by Procopius of Caesarea, Constantine of Rhodes and Constantine Mazarius, he drew 35 representations of the Church of the Holy Apostles including a series of illustrations of the life of Jesus.

=== Exhibition in June 1933 in Paris ===
General Gouraud granted his patronage for an exhibition in the function hall of the town hall of the 13th district of Paris.

The exhibition, Visions féeriques d’Orient (Fantasy Perspectives of the East), grouped together some 172 plates: 80 plates from the Basilique de Sainte-Sophie de Constantinople (Basilica of Hagia Sophia of Constantinople) and 92 plates from L'Art Islamique en Orient (Islamic Art in the East). Raymond’s name was not mentioned on the cover of the exhibition brochure.

== Mosaics ==
=== Byzantine mosaics ===
Raymond created 55 plates grouped together under the title Essai de reconstitution de mosaïques byzantines (Attempt to reproduce Byzantine mosaics). He portrayed the most famous mosaics of Greek, Italian and Turkish churches. He used photographs that he divided into segments and then scale reproduced down to the finest detail; a technique that would much later be known as “micro-mosaics”.

=== Theodora ===
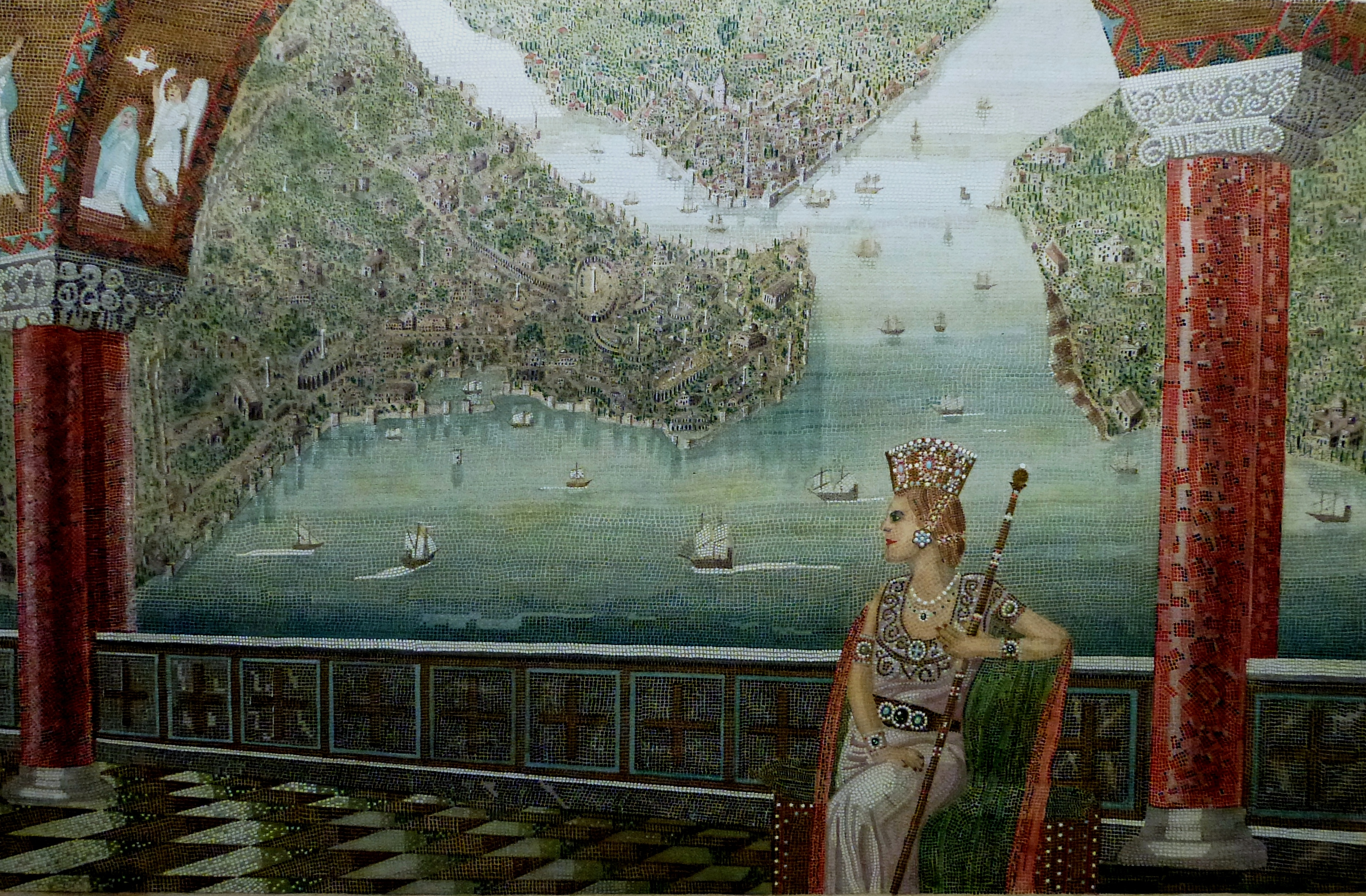
Théodora

Pursuing with mosaics, Raymond created 14 original illustrations of highlights of the life of Empress Theodora, his final work, which he completed on 12 March 1940.

=== Micro-mosaics ===
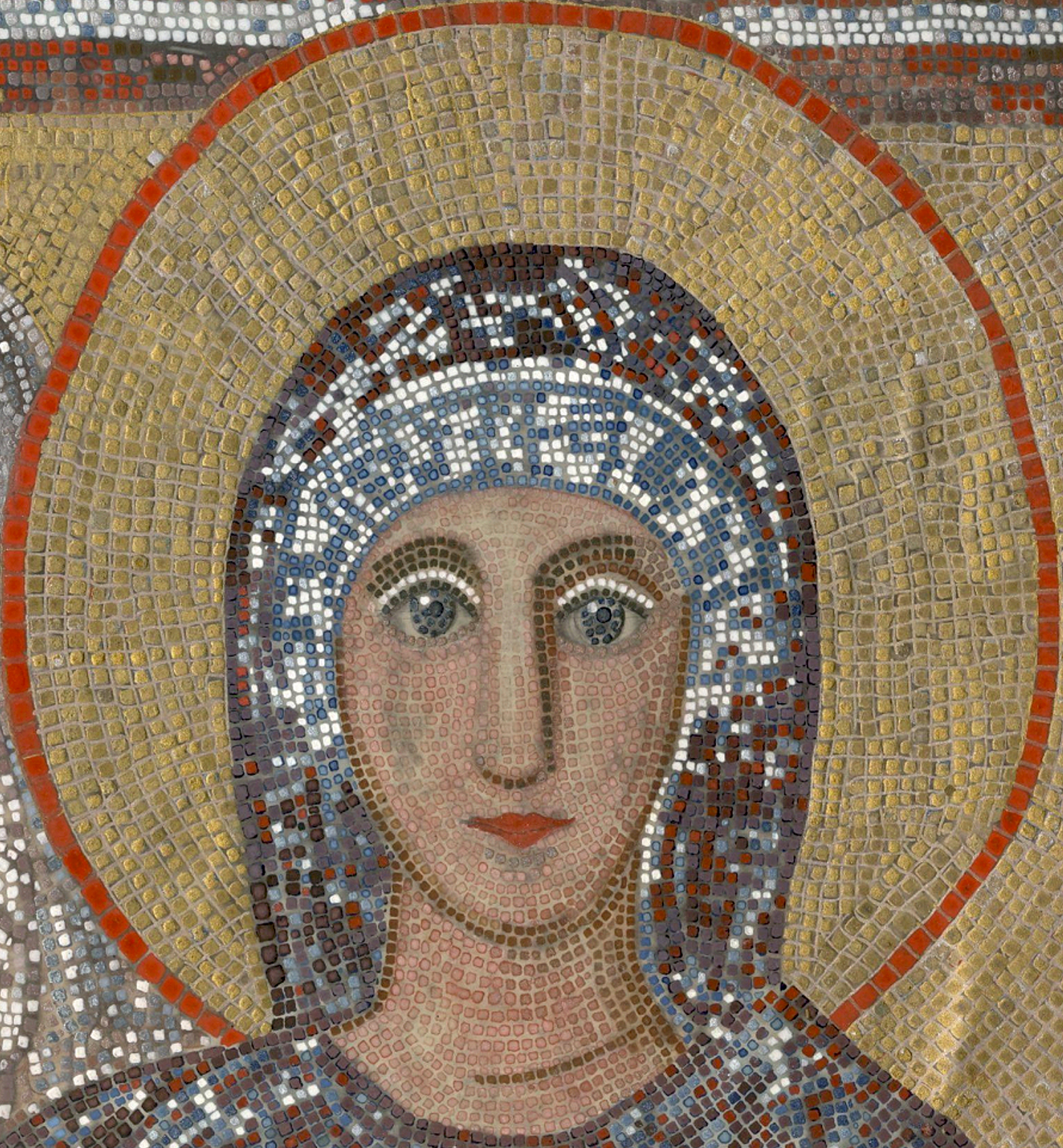
The virgin, near an angel (detail)

Raymond’s “micro-mosaics” evoked pointillism and the yet-to-come pixellation. Raymond worked with a plank of wood on his lap, a magnifying glass in one hand and a paintbrush or a dip pen in the other. He would cut the tip of the nib so he could reproduce the tesserae perfectly.

== Death ==
Raymond died in Nanterre, on 16 May 1941 at the age of 69. He is buried in the Gabriel Péri Communal Cemetery in Colombes.

== Exhibitions ==
- 1933, 10–30 June, Vision féériques d’Orient (Fantasy Perspectives of the East), Paris, town hall of 13th district
- 1956, 26 May – June, Festival d’architecture et d’art monumental (Monument Architecture and Art Festival), Grand Palais, Paris. Exhibition of some originals from La Basilique de Sainte Sophie (Αγία Σοφία) de Constantinople (The Basilica of Hagia Sophia of Constantinople).
- 1999, 2 September – 9 October, Yapı Kredi Cultural Centre, exhibition space of the Sermet Çifter Library, İstiklál Cad. 285, Beyoğlu, Turkey. Exhibition of originals from L’Art Islamique en Orient 1, 2 et 3 (Islamic Art in the East 1, 2 and 3).
- 2021–2022, Exhibition at the Péra Museum – November 2021 – March 2022 – of several of his originals concerning Ayia-Sophia, Theodora and Constantinople (Istanbul).

== Major works ==
=== Paintings, drawings and plans ===
- Plan de l’Institut pour la Construction Séricicole de Brousse (Plan for the Institute for sericulture development in Bursa) (1893)
- Plan des Travaux de Parachèvement de l’Agence d’Angora (Working drawings for the completion of the Ankara Office) (1895)
- Plan de Construction de l’Agence à Ada Bazar (Construction plans for the Ottoman Public Debt Office in Adapazari) (1896)
- Sanctuaires Byzantins (Byzantine Sanctuaries)
- L’Art Islamique dans le Vilayet de Brousse (18 cartes et croquis) (Islamic Art in the Bursa Vilayet (18 cards and sketches)
- L’Art Islamique en Orient (première partie) ou Vieilles Faïences Turques (36 dessins), première édition : Alttürkishe Keramik, (Islamic Art in the East (part one) or Ancient Turkish Faience (36 drawings), first edition: Alttürkishe Keramik, Published by Apollo, Bologna, 1923, (with an introduction by Charles Wulzinger, 36 drawings (40 Plates) printed by Schulz on behalf of Librairie Raymond (bookshop) (Péra, Constantinople); second edition printed in France in Montauban. A large book planned to be the first of a set of three books with the general title L’Art Islamique en Orient (Islamic Art in the East).
- L’Art Islamique en Orient (deuxième partie) ou Fragments d’Architecture Religieuse et Civile (Islamic Art in the East (part two) or Fragments of Religious and Civil Architecture) printed in Prague, 1924, 52 CMY drawings, Librairie Raymond, oriental art and archaeology publications, Péra – Constantinople – Dedicated to Charles Richard Crane with a preface by the author dated 15 July 1923.
- L’Art Islamique en Orient – Troisième Partie (Islamic Art in the East – Part Three). It was to include 60 drawings of panelling, fountains, illuminations, of the Sokollu Mehmed Pasha Mosque in Stamboul, the Selimiye Mosque in Edirne, masterpiece of the architect Atik Sinan with timeline, plans, longitudinal and transverse sections, 12 pages of text (49 x 35.5 cm), unpublished.
- Faïences Décoratives de la Vieille Turquie (Decorative Faience in Ancient Turkey), Paris, Albert Morance, 1927, 29 plates including 3 double pages. Loose sketches and plans in document files, half-black canvas, first flat image illustrated in colour.
- La Basilique de Sainte Sophie (Αγία Σοφία) de Constantinople (The Basilica of Hagia Sophia of Constantinople), 88 drawings (ink, watercolour, gouache, gold-leaf paint): pillars, doorways, corridors, vaults, the great cupola, mosaics, plans, façades, longitudinal and transverse sections, general perspectives, marble facings, major mosaic icons. Three descriptive manuscripts by Procopius of Caesarea, by Anonymous and by the author, 1928–29.
- Essai de Reconstitution de la Basilique des Saints-Apôtres (Attempt to reproduce the Basilica of the Holy Apostles) 37 drawings, 1933.
- Mosaïques Byzantines (Byzantine Mosaics) 55 drawings, 1935.
- Théodora de Byzance (Theodora, Byzantine Empress) 14 drawings, 1940. Published texts
- L’Art du constructeur en Turquie (The Art of Construction in Turkey), 1908, Alexandria.
- Revue Technique d’Orient, 1910–1911, as Editor-in-Chief: miscellaneous articles.
- Une ville célèbre Angora (L’antique Ancyre) (A Famous City, Angora (Antique Ancyra)), Schulz, Prague, 1924.
