= Raimundo =

The name Raimundo may refer to:

- Raimundo, 2nd Duke of Castel Duino (1907–1986)
- Raimundo Calcagno, Spanish screenwriter
- Raimundo Rolón, brief President of Paraguay
- Raimundo Orsi, Argentinian footballer
- Raimundo Diosdado Caballero, Catholic miscellaneous writer
- Raimundo Andueza Palacio, former President of Venezuela
- Raimundo de Ovies, American religious leader, author, columnist, and humanitarian
- Raimundo Fernández Villaverde, Spanish statesman
- Raimundo Pérez Lezama, Spanish/Basque footballer
- Raimundo de Madrazo y Garreta, Spanish realist painter
- Ueslei Raimundo Pereira da Silva, Brazilian footballer
- Raimundo Lulio, writer and philosopher
- Oscar Raimundo Benavides, former President of Peru
- Raimundo of Toledo, French Archbishop of Toledo
- Raimundo Ferreira Ramos, Brazilian footballer
- Raymond of Penyafort, Spanish Dominican friar
- Raimundo Santiago, actor
- Raimundo Yant, Venezuelan boxer
- José Raimundo Carrillo, early Spanish settler
- Wilson Raimundo Júnior, Brazilian footballer
- José Raimundo Martínez, founder of the ETB (company)
- Raimundo Justin Alexander III, Portuguese Largest Landowner Portugal
- Raimundo António Rodrigues Serrão, Portuguese colonial governor of Portuguese Guinea
- Raimundo Fajardo, drummer of El Otro Yo
- Raimundo Camacho, Bolivian wrestler at the 1984 Summer Olympics

== In fiction ==
- Raimundo Pedrosa, character in American animated television series Xiaolin Showdown (2003–2006)

== Places ==
- San Raimundo, municipality in the Guatemala department of Guatemala

== See also ==
- Raimundos, a Brazilian band
