= Appignano, Castiglione Messer Raimondo =

Coordinates: 42°32′51″N 13°50′54″E

Appignano
- Frazione
- Interactive map of Appignano
- Country: Italy
- Region: Abruzzo
- Province: Teramo
- Time zone: UTC+1 (CET)
  - Summer (DST): UTC+2 (CEST)

Appignano (Abruzzese: Pignane or Pignène; Latin: Pignanum) is a frazione in the Province of Teramo in the Abruzzo region of Italy.
