= Raimondo =

Given name

Raimondo is an Italian given name. Its English equivalent is Raymond. Notable people with the name include:

- Raimondo Boucheron (1800–1876), Italian composer, chiefly of sacred music
- Raimondo D'Inzeo (1925–2013), Italian show jumping rider
- Raimondo del Balzo Orsini (died 1406), nobleman of the Kingdom of Naples
- Raimondo delle Vigne (1330–1399), leading member of the Dominican Order
- Raimondo di Sangro (1710–1771), Italian nobleman, inventor, soldier, writer and scientist
- Raimondo Epifanio (1440–1482), Italian painter of the Renaissance period
- Raimondo Feletti (1887–1927), Italian physician and zoologist
- Raimondo Franchetti has been the name of more than one Italian baron
- Raimondo Guarini (1765–1852), Italian archaeologist, epigrapher, poet, college president, and teacher
- Raimondo Manzini (1668–1744), Italian painter
- Raimondo Manzini (journalist), Catholic journalist, Christian Democratic member of Italy's Parliament
- Raimondo Montecuccoli (1608–1680), Italian military general, prince of the Holy Roman Empire and Neapolitan duke of Melfi
- Raimondo Ponte (born 1955), former Swiss-Italian footballer
- Raimondo Prinoth, Italian luger who competed during the 1960s
- Raimondo Spiazzi (1918–2004), Italian Catholic theologian, advisor to Pius XII, and Mariologist
- Raimondo Tommaso D'Aronco (1857–1932), Italian architect
- Raimondo Viale Don Raimondo Viale (1907–1984), Italian Catholic priest
- Raimondo Vianello (1922–2010), Italian film actor, comedian, and television host

== See also ==
- Raimondo (surname)
- Appignano (Castiglione Messer Raimondo), frazione in the Province of Teramo in the Abruzzo region of Italy
- Castiglione Messer Raimondo, town and comune in Teramo province in the Abruzzo region of eastern Italy
- Civitella Messer Raimondo, comune and town in the Province of Chieti in the Abruzzo region of Italy
- Italian cruiser Raimondo Montecuccoli, Condottieri class light cruiser serving with the Italian Regia Marina during World War II
- San Raimondo, Siena, church in Siena, Tuscany, Italy
