= RAE =

RAE may stand for:

- Arar Domestic Airport (IATA:RAE), Saudi Arabia
- Radiodifusión Argentina al Exterior, Argentina's shortwave international broadcaster
- RAE Bedford, Royal Aircraft Establishment (Bedford)
- RAE Systems
- RAE (Ring, Adair & Elwyn), tube, a type of Endotracheal tube used in anaesthesia
- Real Academia Española (Royal Spanish Academy), official overseer of the Spanish language
- Régional (ICAO code), a French airline
- Relative age effect, whereby participation is higher amongst the eldest of an age group
- Research Assessment Exercise
- Restore America's Estuaries, Coastal Habitat Restoration non-profit organization
- Retinol Activity Equivalents, a term referring to vitamin A activity
- Romani people, Ashkali and Balkan Egyptians
- The Rock-afire Explosion
- Royal Aircraft Establishment (later Royal Aerospace Establishment), a former British research establishment
- Royal Australian Engineers, army corps
- Russian Expo Arms, international military exhibition

== See also ==
- Rae (disambiguation)
