= Rae =

Rae may refer to:

== People ==
- Rae (given name), including a list of people with the given name
- Rae (surname), including a list of people with the surname

== Nicknames for ==
- Desirae
- Rachel (given name)
- Rachelle
- Raquel
- Raven (given name)
- Reema
- Reena (disambiguation)
- Rekha (born 1954)
- Reshma (1947–2013)
- Raelyn
- Valkyrae

== Science ==
- RaE, the historic notation of Bismuth-210 isotope

== Entertainment ==
- Norma Rae, 1979 American film
- The Rock-afire Explosion, an animatronic robot band
- Rae (album), an album by American singer-songwriter Ashe

== Places ==
- Rae Parish, municipality in Harju County, Estonia
- Rae, Harju County, village in Rae Parish, Harju County, Estonia
- Rae, Pärnu County, village in Vänrda Parish, Pärnu County, Estonia
- Rae craton (in geology of northern Canada)

== See also ==
- Behchoko, Northwest Territories, made up of the former communities of Rae and Edzo
- Raekwon (born 1970), American rapper
- RAE (disambiguation)
- Ray (disambiguation)
- Rey (disambiguation)
- Rhea (disambiguation)
