= Rae (given name) =

- Gender: Unisex

Origin
- Origin: Scottish, German
- Meaning: fortress, counsel

Other names
- Related names: Ray, Raymond, MacRae

Rae is a unisex given name. The Scottish name Rae is often associated with the Gaelic term "rath" which means "fortress." Rae is also the female variant of the Old High German Ray from regin meaning "counsel".

== People ==
- Rae Allen (1926–2022), American actress
- Rae Anderson (squash player) (born 1953), Australian squash player
- Rae Anderson (athlete) (born 1997), Australian Paralympic athlete
- Rae Armantrout (born 1947), American poet
- Rae Baker (born 1973), British actress
- Rae Bernstein (1904–1999), American pianist
- Rae Bridgman, Canadian anthropologist and writer
- Rae Burrell (born 2000), American professional basketball player
- Rae Carruth (born 1974), American football player
- Rae Carson (born 1973), American writer
- Rae Dawn Chong (born 1961), Canadian actress
- Rae Cousins, American politician
- Rae Dalven (1904–1992), American professor
- Rae Earl (born 1971), British writer
- Rae L. Egbert (1891–1964), American politician
- Rae Lil Black, Japanese model, social media influencer, and former pornographic actress
- Rae Featherstone (1907–1987), Australian architect
- Rae Hendrie (born 1976), Scottish actress
- Rae Howells, Welsh writer
- Rae Johnstone (1905–1964), Australian jockey
- Rae Helen Langton (born 1961), Australian philosopher
- Rae Morris (born 1992), British singer
- Rae O'Donnell, Hong Kong international lawn and indoor bowler
- Rae Russel (1925–2008), American photographer
- Rae Samuels (1887–1979), American vaudeville entertainer
- Rae Sanchini, film and television producer known for Titanic, Dark Angel, and True Lies among others
- Rae Weston (1941–2014), New Zealand professor of banking and management
- Rae White (born 1985), Australian poet and writer
- Rae Woodland (1922–2013), British singer
- Rae Hoffstetter (Valkyrae) (born 1992), American streamer and YouTuber

== Fictional characters ==
- Rae Cummings, on American soap opera One Life to Live
- Rae Thomas, on American soap opera Passions
- Rae Wilson, on British television series Hollyoaks
- Shrinking Ray/Rae, superhero in the Invincible comics and its television adaptation
- Rae Taylor, main protagonist of I'm in Love with the Villainess
- Rachael "Rae" Theresa Doe, protagonist in American comic strip Rae the Doe

== See also ==
- Rae Sremmurd, American hip hop duo
- Rae (disambiguation)
