= Ray (given name) =

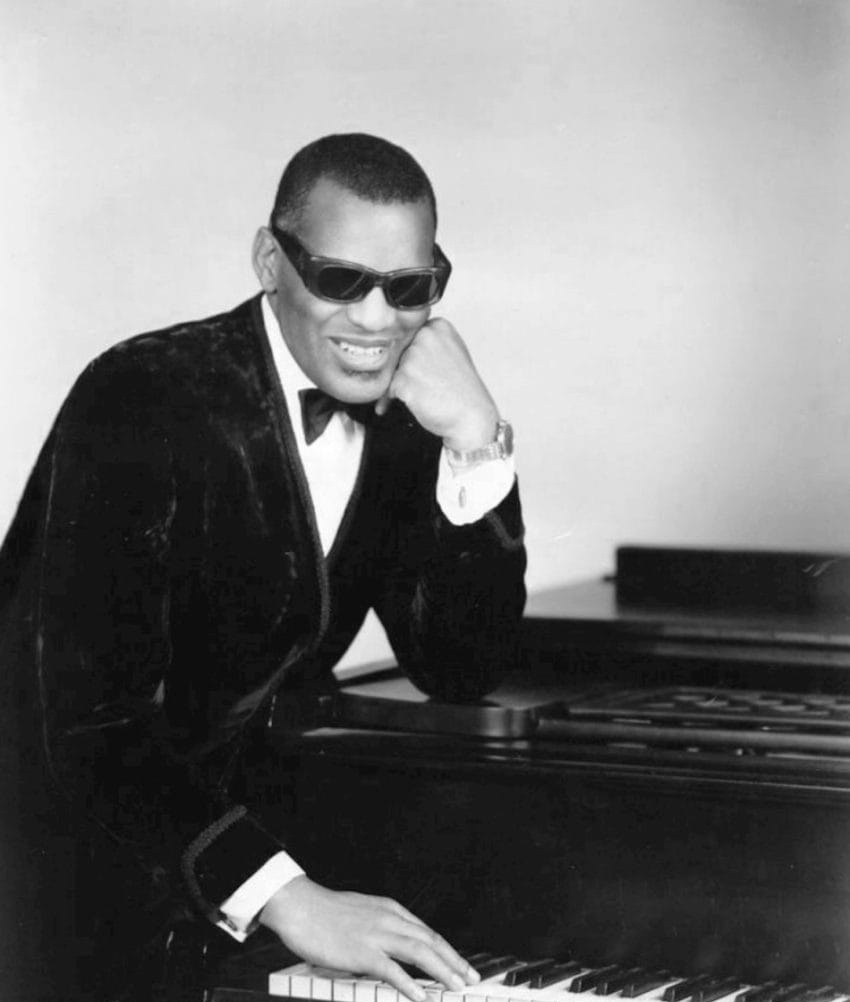
- Ray Charles in 1969
- Pronunciation: /reɪ/
- Gender: Male

Other names
- Related names: Raymond, Rachel

Ray is a given name and short form (hypocorism) of the given name Raymond and Rachel.

== Politics ==
- Ray Aguilar (born 1947), Nebraska state senator
- Ray Aguilera, Pueblo, Colorado City council member
- Ray Ahipene-Mercer (born 1948), New Zealand city councillor in Wellington
- Ray Frenette (1935–2018), Canadian politician in New Brunswick
- Ray Gricar (1945–2011), district attorney of Centre County, Pennsylvania
- Ray Groom (born 1944), Australian lawyer, sportsman and politician
- Ray Harmel (1905–1998), South African anti-apartheid activist
- Ray LaHood (born 1945), American politician
- Ray Liberti, American politician
- Ray Mabus (born 1948), American politician, Secretary of the Navy and former Governor of Mississippi
- Ray Martin (politician) (born 1941), Canadian politician, former leader of the Alberta New Democratic Party
- Ray Mattox (1927–2005), American politician
- Ray Michie (1934–2008), Scottish politician
- Ray Price (speechwriter) (1930–2019), President Richard Nixon's chief speechwriter
- Ray Salva (born 1947), American politician
- Ray Alexander Simons (1914–2004), South African communist and trade unionist
- Ray Strachey (1887–1940), British feminist politician, artist and writer
- Ray Tarver (1921–1972), American dentist and politician
- Ray White (politician), Canadian politician
- Ray Whitney (politician) (1930–2012), UK politician
- Ray Wyatt, American politician

== Music ==
- Ray (musician) (born 1990), Japanese singer and radio personality
- Ray Abrams (musician) (1920–1992), American jazz and jump blues tenor saxophonist
- Ray Alexander (musician) (1925–2002), American jazz drummer and vibraphonist
- Ray Anderson (musician) (born 1952), American jazz trombone and trumpet player
- Ray Anthony (born 1922), American bandleader, trumpeter, songwriter and actor
- Ray BLK (born 1994), British singer and songwriter
- Ray Boltz (born 1953), American Christian singer-songwriter
- Ray Brown Jr. (born 1949), American jazz and blues pianist and singer
- Ray Brown (musician) (1926–2002), American jazz double bassist
- Ray Bryant (1931–2011), American jazz pianist, composer
- Ray C (born 1982), Tanzanian musician
- Ray Charles (1930–2004), American singer, songwriter, musician and composer
- Ray Charles (musician, born 1918) (1918–2015), American musician, leader of The Ray Charles Singers
- Ray Chen (born 1989), Taiwanese-American violinist
- Ray Conniff (1916–2002), American bandleader and arranger
- Ray Dalton (born 1991), American singer-songwriter, best known for his role on Can't Hold Us
- Ray Davies (born 1944), English rhythm guitarist, vocalist and songwriter for The Kinks
- Ray Davis (musician) (1940–2005), member of The Parliaments, Parliament, Funkadelic, and The Temptations
- Ray Dorset (born 1946), British guitarist, singer, and founding member of Mungo Jerry
- Ray Fisher (singer) (1940–2011), Scottish folk singer
- Ray Griff (1940–2016), Canadian country music singer-songwriter
- Ray Hedges, English songwriter and record producer
- Ray Heindorf (1908–1980), American songwriter, composer, conductor, and arranger
- Ray Isaac (singer), Australian singer
- Ray LaMontagne (born 1973), American singer-songwriter
- Ray Lev (1912–1968), American classical pianist
- Ray Lewis, American rhythm and blues singer and member of The Drifters
- Ray Luzier (born 1970), American drummer
- Ray Manzarek (1939–2013), American musician, singer, producer, film director and author, best known as a founding member and keyboardist of The Doors
- Ray Martin (orchestra leader) (1918–1988), British-Austrian orchestra leader born Kurt Kohn
- Ray Parker Jr. (born 1954), American guitarist, singer, songwriter and producer
- Ray Pennington (1933–2020), American country music singer-songwriter
- Ray Peterson (1939–2005), American pop singer
- Ray Price (1926–2013), American country singer-songwriter and guitarist
- Ray Sawyer (1937–2018), American singer, founding member of Dr. Hook & the Medicine Show
- Ray Singleton (1937–2016), American producer, songwriter, and vocalist
- Ray Thomas (1941–2018), English flautist, singer-songwriter, founding member of The Moody Blues
- Ray Toro (born 1977), American rock guitarist

== Sports ==
- Ray (wrestler) (1982–2018), Hong Kong professional wrestler
- Ray Bassil (born 1988), Lebanese trap shooter
- Ray Abruzzese (1937–2011), American college and football player
- Ray Adduono (born 1947), Canadian ice hockey player
- Ray Agnew (born 1967), American National Football League player
- Ray Alexander (gridiron football) (born 1962), American National Football League and Canadian Football League player
- Ray Allan (born 1955), Scottish footballer
- Ray Allen (born 1975), American National Basketball Association player
- Ray Allison (born 1959), Canadian National Hockey League player
- Ray Amm (1927–1955), Rhodesian motorcycle racer
- Ray Amoo, Nigerian boxer of the 1970s and 1980s
- Ray Anderson (boxer) (born 1944), American light heavyweight boxer
- Ray Austin (boxer) (born 1970), American boxer
- Ray Austin (American football) (born 1974), American National Football League player
- Ray Bourque (born 1960), Canadian National Hockey League player
- Ray Brown (offensive lineman) (born 1962), American National Football League player
- Ray Brown (safety) (1949–2023), American National Football League player
- Ray Brown (American football, born 1936) (1936–2017), American National Football League quarterback
- Ray Brown (Negro leagues pitcher) (1908–1965), Negro league baseball pitcher
- Ray Brown (rugby league) (born 1957), Australian rugby league footballer
- Ray Chapman (1891–1920), American baseball player
- Ray Cillien (1939–1991), Luxembourg boxer
- Ray Collins (baseball) (1887–1970), Major league Baseball Player (Pitcher for Boston Red Sox)
- Ray Coney (born 2005), American football player
- Ray Emery (1982–2018), Canadian National Hockey League goaltender
- Ray Graves (1918–2015), American college football and National Football League player and college football coach
- Ray Guy (1949–2022), American National Football League Hall-of-Fame punter
- Ray Hanken (1911–1980), American National Football League player
- Ray Harroun (1879–1968), American racecar driver
- Ray Isaac (American football), American football player
- Ray Illingworth (1932–2021), British cricketer
- Ray Jauch (born 1938), coach in the Canadian Football League, United States Football League and Arena Football League
- Ray Julian (born 1936), English cricketer
- Ray Lazdins (born 1964), Canadian discus thrower
- Sugar Ray Leonard (born 1956), American boxer
- Ray Lewis (born 1975), American National Football League player
- Ray Lewis (referee) (born 1944), English association football referee
- Ray Lewis (sprinter) (1910–2003), Canadian track-and-field sprinter
- Ray Mabbutt (1936–2016), English footballer
- Ray Martin (baseball) (1925–2013), American Major League Baseball pitcher
- Ray Martin (English footballer) (born 1945), English footballer
- Ray Martin (pool player) (born 1936), American pool player
- Ray Milo (born 1954), American football player
- Ray Nitschke (1936–1998), American Hall-of-Fame National Football League player
- Ray Perkins (1941–2020), American football player and coach
- Ray Price (cricketer) (born 1976), Zimbabwean cricketer
- Ray Price (motorcyclist) (1937–2015), American motorcycle drag racer, designer and engineer
- Ray Price (rugby) (born 1953), Australian rugby union, and rugby league footballer of the 1970s and 1980s
- Ray Rice (born 1987), American National Football League player
- Ray Ritchie (Australian rules footballer) (1889–1950), Australian rules footballer
- Sugar Ray Robinson (1921–1989), American Hall-of-Fame boxer born Walker Smith Jr.
- Ray Sefo (born 1971), New Zealand fight promoter and retired kickboxer, boxer, and mixed martial artist of Samoan descent
- Ray Tesser (1912–1982), American National Football League player
- Ray Voltz, American soccer goalkeeper
- Ray Wallace (footballer) (born 1969), English footballer
- Ray Wells (born 1980), American National Football League player
- Ray Whitney (ice hockey) (born 1972), Canadian National Hockey League player
- Ray Wilkins (1956–2018), British footballer and football coach
- Ray Witter (1896–1983), American football player

== Film and TV ==
- Ray Abruzzo (born 1954), American actor
- Ray Aghayan (1928–2011), Iranian-American costume designer in the film industry
- Ray Alan (1930–2010), English ventriloquist and television entertainer
- Ray Austin (1932–2023), British television director
- Ray Bolger (1904–1987), American actor, singer and dancer
- Ray Boyle (1923–2022), American film and television actor
- Ray Cokes (born 1958), English television presenter and video jockey
- Ray Combs (1956–1996), American comedian, actor and game show host
- Ray Cox (1881–1957), American actress and vaudeville performer
- Ray Fisher (born 1987), American actor, known for his role as Cyborg in the DC Extended Universe
- Ray Gallardo, American film director and cinematographer
- Ray Girardin (1935–2019), American film, stage, and television actor
- Ray June (1895–1958), American cinematographer
- Ray Kellogg (1919–1981), American film and television actor
- Ray Liotta (1954–2022), American film actor
- Ray MacDonald (born 1977), Thai actor, adventurer and television presenter
- Ray Martin (born 1944), Australian television presenter
- Ray Mears (born 1964), British TV personality and survival specialist
- Ray Milland (1907-1986), Welsh-American actor and film director
- Ray Park (born 1974), Scottish actor and martial artist
- Ray Porter, American actor
- Ray Quinn (born 1988), English actor
- Ray Reyes (1970–2021), Filipino-American singer and actor
- Ray Romano (born 1957), American actor, comedian and screenwriter
- Ray Shirley, American actress
- Ray Stark (1915–2004), independent film producer
- Ray Stevens (born 1939), American country- and pop singer-songwriter and comedian
- Ray Stevenson (1964–2023), Northern Irish actor
- Ray Szmanda (1926-2018), American radio and television announcer
- Ray Walston (1914–2001), American character actor
- Ray Winstone (born 1957), British actor, notable for parts in gangster films
- Ray Wise (born 1947), American actor

== Business ==
- Ray Anderson (entrepreneur) (1934–2011), founder and chairman of Interface Inc.
- Ray Dalio, founder and co-CIO of Bridgewater Associates, the world's largest hedge fund
- Ray Davis (businessman), American billionaire businessman, chief executive officer of Energy Transfer Partners and owner of the Texas Rangers of Major League Baseball
- Ray Kroc (1902–1984), American businessman and philanthropist who built up the McDonald's Corporation

== Academia ==
- Ray Allen Billington (1903–1981), American historian
- Ray Blanchard (born 1945), American-Canadian sexologist
- Ray Hyman (born 1928), American Professor Emeritus of Psychology at the University of Oregon, author, magician and critic of parapsychology
- Ray Kurzweil (born 1948), American author, computer scientist, inventor and futurist

== Writing and journalism ==
- Ray Anderson (journalist), American reporter for The New York Times
- Ray Bradbury (1920–2012), American fantasy, science fiction, horror and mystery writer
- Ray Galton (1930–2020), British scriptwriter
- Ray Marcano, American medical reporter and music critic
- Ray Martin (television presenter) (born 1944), Australian journalist

== Other ==
- Raymond Affleck (1922–1989), Canadian architect
- Ray Brown (designer) (born 1959), Australian clothing designer
- Ray Comfort (born 1949), New Zealand-born Christian minister and evangelist
- Raymond G. Davis (1915–2003), US four-star general and recipient of the Medal of Honor
- Ray Eames (1912–1988), American artist, designer and filmmaker
- Ray Frank (1861–1948), Jewish religious leader in the United States
- Ray Gosling (1939–2013), British gay rights activist
- Ray Herman (1920–1996), American publisher, editor, writer, penciller and inker
- Ray Howard-Jones (1903–1996), Welsh painter
- Ray Johnson (1927–1995), American artist
- Ray Jones (chaplain) (born 1934), Anglican priest
- Ray Lewis (youth worker) (born 1963), Guyanese-born youth worker and former deputy mayor of London
- Ray Milne (1914–2007), Scottish cinephile, translator and schoolteacher
- Rachel Browne (born Ray Minkoff; 1934–2012), American dancer, teacher and choreographer
- Ray Navarro (1964–1990), American artist, filmmaker, and HIV/AIDS activist
- Ray William Johnson (born 1981), American YouTube comedian

== Fictional characters ==
- Ray (DC Comics), a comics character
  - Ray (Ray Terrill), the second version of the character
- Ray (Ninjago), a character in Ninjago
- Ray (The Promised Neverland), a main character in the manga series The Promised Neverland
- Ray the Flying Squirrel, a video game character from Sonic the Hedgehog
- Ray Barone, main character in the American sitcom Everybody Loves Raymond
- Raymond "Ray" Curto, a character on The Sopranos
- Ray Donovan, titular main character in the American TV drama series Ray Donovan
- Father Ray Mukada, priest character in the American TV drama series Oz
- Ray Garraty, a protagonist character from Stephen King dystopian Novel The Long Walk
- Ray Stantz, a character in the Ghostbusters series
- Ray Wilkins (Scary Movie), a character in the Scary Movie film franchise

== See also ==
- Rae (given name)
