= North Carolina Coastal Federation =

- North Carolina Coastal Federation Inc.
- Formation: 1982; 44 years ago
- Type: Nonprofit
- Tax ID no.: 58-1494098
- Legal status: 501(c)(3)
- Headquarters: Newport, North Carolina
- Region served: Coastal North Carolina
- Executive Director: Todd Miller
- Website: Official website

The North Carolina Coastal Federation is a nonprofit organization that works with coastal residents and visitors to protect and restore the beautiful and productive N.C. coast. The four main areas in which the federation operates include: coastal advocacy; environmental education; habitat and water quality restoration and preservation; and support in the improvement and enforcement of environmental laws. The federation headquarters are located in Newport (Ocean), North Carolina, with regional offices in Wanchese and Wrightsville Beach, North Carolina. The federation is currently a member of Restore America's Estuaries (RAE).

== History ==
The federation's current executive director, Todd Miller, started the federation in 1982 after receiving a grant from the Mary Reynolds Babcock Foundation to preserve N.C.'s sounds and wetlands. Shortly after the federation began, it spearheaded a movement to oppose a 120,000-acre project to strip-mine peat bogs from Albemarle to Pamlico sounds. Through the assembly of concerned scientists, fishermen and environmentalists, the proposal was defeated in 1984 and today many of the formerly targeted areas are now national wildlife refuges.

== Mission ==
The North Carolina Coastal Federation empowers coastal residents and visitors from all walks of life to protect and restore the water quality and critically important natural habitats of the N.C. coast.

== Actions ==
Actions on Industrial Development: The federation has joined with numerous groups to help aid in the protection against water contaminants such as mercury and phosphates. The federation helped stop the construction of a sulfur plant in Morehead City that was to be built along the port wall, located directly on the Intracoastal Waterway. It helped prevent the establishment of industrial mines across the coast, specifically on the Cape Fear River located north of Wilmington. It is currently teaming up with doctors, environmental groups and thousands of concerned citizens in opposing a project from Titan America to create a large cement kiln that would release toxic substances into the water and air, projected to destroy over 1,000 acres of coastal wetlands. The federation is also monitoring proposals which could allow for oil and gas explorations across the coastal watersheds.

Actions on Beach Protection: With hurricanes being prevalent along the coast of NC, The dune lines prevent overwash and cause erosion. Furthermore, this prevents the marsh and estuaries from getting the nutrients and sand deposits it needs to survive. NCCF continuously supports safeguards along NC's coastal beaches and islands. One example of such an action is NCCF's partnership with NOAA and other environmental organizations to design and implement the Jokey's Ridge Living Shoreline and Oyster Reef Restoration Project in the Outer Banks of NC.

Actions on Polluted Runoff: One of the major focuses regarding advocacy is to reduce the amount of stormwater runoff that enters the waters along the coast of NC. The federation works with local communities, schools and environmental organizations to develop strategies to decrease stormwater runoff in coastal waterways. Stormwater runoff is the most significant water quality issue along the coast, specifically in the White Oak River and other coastal waters, as the influx of pollutants threatens the wellbeing of the ecosystem.

Actions on Habitat & Water Quality Restoration: Currently there are numerous state agencies partnering with federation studying ways to implement "living shorelines" and promote healthy estuary, beach and shoreline management.

== Advocacy ==
=== Environmental Issues ===
Northeast Coast Issues: The Mattamuskeet Drainage District in Hyde County spans over 42,500 acres and discharges water through major tributaries and canals into the Pamlico Sound and Intracoastal Waterway. Stormwater runoff is a major concern due to the high concentrations of bacteria and nutrients from agriculture and other nearby sources that lead to water contamination. The federation is working with farmers to restore wetlands and reduce discharges of farm drainage to the estuaries.

Southeast Coastal Issues: Titan America is proposing to build one of the largest cement producing and strip mining industries in the U.S. on the Cape Fear River. Emissions from the facility would release large amounts of mercury into the air and water supply that would threaten local ecosystems and approximately 1,000 acres of coastal wetlands. This project is also projected to negatively impact surface and groundwater quality throughout the Cape Fear River Basin.

Central Coastal Issues: One of the most beautiful rivers on the N.C.'s coast is the White Oak River, which is polluted by stormwater runoff pollution. Numerous areas of the river are closed to the harvest of oysters and clams because of bacteria contamination caused by land uses that cause polluted stormwater runoff.

=== Accomplishments ===
Northeast Coast Accomplishments: Through grant funding and other collaborations with the Environmental Protection Agency (EPA), the federation focuses efforts on restoring the water quality of the Pamilco Sound area. More specifically the federation works on projects to minimize the amount of bacteria that contaminates this vast underwater ecosystem.

Southeast Coast Accomplishments: Bradley and Hewletts Creeks are currently the subjects of bacteria pollution, with stormwater runoff being the predominant source. The federation helped to devise a plan to restore the water quality in these areas and actively works to reduce stormwater pollution.

Central Coast Accomplishments: The federation's central coast branch completed projects in the evaluation and reduction of stormwater flow into the White Oak River Watershed by advocating and implementing low impact development.

== Education ==
=== Accomplishments ===
The Coastal Advocacy Institute: The Coastal Advocacy Institute is an internship program through the federation in which students have the opportunity to learn about current issues from world-renowned scientists, nonprofit professionals and coastal management experts. Interns also partake in summer projects to further help NCCF in its mission to protect the coast.

Jones Island Environmental Education and Restoration Area: In October 2007 the federation entered into a collaborative effort with Audubon North Carolina, the N.C. Division of Parks and Recreation and the N.C. Clean Water Management Trust Fund to purchase 17 acres of Jones Island, an island located in the middle of the White Oak River. Shortly after the purchase, the island was turned over to the NC State Parks System through a memorandum agreement for the federation to mutually administer an education program for students and adults. Jones Island is also home to numerous fishery projects, student camping excursions and field trips for students and tourists.

Student Involvement in Restoration Projects: Nearly 5,000 students have helped plant marsh grasses, create oyster reefs and implement rain gardens to reduce water contamination from stormwater runoff. The students establish and continue to monitor the projects throughout their volunteer experiences. Through this program students are able to gain hands-on experience while helping to restore the estuaries along NC's coast.

Northeast Coast Education: Teaching students the importance of reducing stormwater runoff has been a key component of NCCF. Students created rain gardens as a means of reducing stormwater runoff into waterways at numerous schools throughout the coastal regions including: Columbia Middle School, First Flight Elementary School, First Flight Middle School, Kitty Hawk Elementary School, Manteo High School and Manteo Middle School.

Central Coast Education: Jones Island, located on the White Oak River near the town of Swansboro, is part of Hammocks Beach State Park. This unique island serves as a center for environmental education and restoration projects led by the federation and the N.C. State Parks System. Students come to Jones Island to rebuild natural habitats and learn about the native ecology of the island. Typical projects include planting marsh grasses such as Spartina and building oyster reefs in an effort to create "living shorelines" around the island. These projects also improve water quality through oysters' ability to filter 50 gallons of water per day.

Southeast Coast Education: Through collaboration with the federation, Alderman Elementary School in Wilmington, N.C., implemented a rain garden to catch stormwater runoff and improve the water quality of nearby areas. Six additional rain gardens were installed in the year of 2011 at Bradley Creek Elementary School, also located in Wilmington. These collective projects have diverted over 100,000 gallons of stormwater runoff and served as an educational link between hands-on experiences and the importance of native ecology and hydrology on local water quality.

== Restoration and Preservation ==
=== About ===
The Federation's Habitat Restoration and Preservation Program works to maintain, rebuild, and uphold N.C.'s most threatened ecosystems while raising public attention to the inherent worth and beauty of coastal environments. The projects include work with oyster reefs, wetlands, and longleaf pine forests. A large focus of the Habitat Restoration and Preservation Program is the development of "living shorelines" which serve as alternatives to standard shoreline bulkheads. In addition, the Program aims to protect and restore coastal water quality through watershed hydrology projects.

=== Issues ===
Northeast Coast Issues: Durrant's Point is an area of land protecting Hatteras Harbor, which was disappearing at a rate of 5 to 10 feet per year due to significant erosion. In March 2011, the federation partnered with Dare County officials and volunteers to install a low-profile granite sill spanning over 320 feet to divert wave energy and protect recently restored and existing marsh.

Central Coast Issues: Beacon Island, located in the Pamlico Sound, is home to one of nine nesting sites of the Brown Pelican in the state of N.C. Beacon Island supported approximately 423 nesting pairs of Brown Pelicans in 2011. In efforts to address the pressing issue of erosion, NCCF has partnered with Audubon North Carolina to rebuild the nesting habitat of the Brown Pelican through a grant from TogetherGreen. Additional funding providers include the Southeast Aquatic Resources Partnership, NOAA and Restore America's Estuaries.

Southeast Coast Issues: In the Lockwood Folly River watershed there is an influx of pollution from stormwater runoff. Such runoff can contain sediments, fecal bacteria and other pollutants that enter the watershed and lead to problems within the ecosystem. To confront this issue, the federation has partnered with residents to build and implement two large rain gardens that will catch stormwater runoff from the surrounding paved areas of marinas, parking lots and roads.

=== Accomplishments ===
Low Impact Development: The federation works on multiple projects supporting Low Impact Development (LID), a fairly recent strategy in reducing and preventing stormwater pollution in land development. Through collaboration with coastwide partners and governments, NCCF is establishing stormwater reduction measures at current areas of stormwater pollution and creating LID ordinances for recent development in addition to retrofitting current projects. Such efforts include the construction and installation of wetlands, rain barrels, bio-retention areas, large cisterns and rain gardens with the goal of protecting and restoring the coastal swimming waters and shellfish population from bacterial pollution.

Restoration Efforts: Since 2005 the federation has worked alongside over 1700 volunteers to restore Hammock's Beach State Park by planting over 43,000 saltmarsh plants—including black needlerush, salt meadow hay and smooth cordgrass—to help prevent erosion along the vulnerable shoreline. In addition, the federation created over 700 feet of oyster shell bag sills and released more than 10,000 bushels of loose oysters in shallow waters. Each year the federation creates several acres of new oyster reefs to improve coastal water quality and provide valuable habitat for oysters and other important marine species.

Contributions to Science: The federation is currently working on a large wetlands restoration project in North Carolina at North River Farms in Carteret County to reduce direct agricultural discharges into estuaries. Furthermore, the federation is working with scientists at N.C. State University and U.S. Geological Survey to gain scientific understanding of carbon sequestration through the creation of wetlands in efforts to mitigate climate change.

== Relevant Information ==
=== Living Shorelines ===
Concrete seawalls, bulkheads and revetments are examples of hardened structures traditionally used to stabilize shorelines that ironically increase erosion rates, reduce the shoreline's capacity to undergo natural processes and minimize estuarine habitats. NCCF feels that the best approach to battle erosion issues is to plan for erosion to occur and build as distant from the water's edge as possible. However, when this isn't possible NCCF supports utilizing stabilization techniques that induce the least amount of damage to natural ecosystems and uphold the natural structure of the marsh areas. One such approach NCCF takes is advocating for the construction of "living shorelines" when necessary. Living shorelines are new alternatives to stabilize shorelines that utilize organic materials such as oyster reefs, coir fiber logs, wetland plants, stones, sand fill, and submerged aquatic vegetation. Living shorelines protect surrounding intertidal and riparian environments, improve water quality by filtration of runoff, decrease erosion rates and create terrestrial and aquatic habitats.

== Coastal Review ==
The federation publishes the Coastal Review, a nonprofit news service that covers issues related to North Carolina's coasts. It has been published since 1983 and is archived as part of the North Carolina Coastal Federation Papers at University of North Carolina Wilmington's Center for Southeast North Carolina Archives and History. The Coastal Review is distributed to federation members on a quarterly basis.
