= MSA Safety =

American manufacturing company

MSA Safety Incorporated
- Type: Public
- Traded as: NYSE: MSA; S&P 400 Component
- Industry: Safety equipment
- Founded: 14 June 1914; 112 years ago
- Headquarters: Cranberry Township, Pennsylvania
- Key people: Steve Blanco, CEO
- Products: SCBA; Gas detector Hard hat Safety harness Respirator; Thermal imaging camera
- Revenue: ▲US$1.87 billion (2025)
- Number of employees: 5,000
- Website: www.msasafety.com

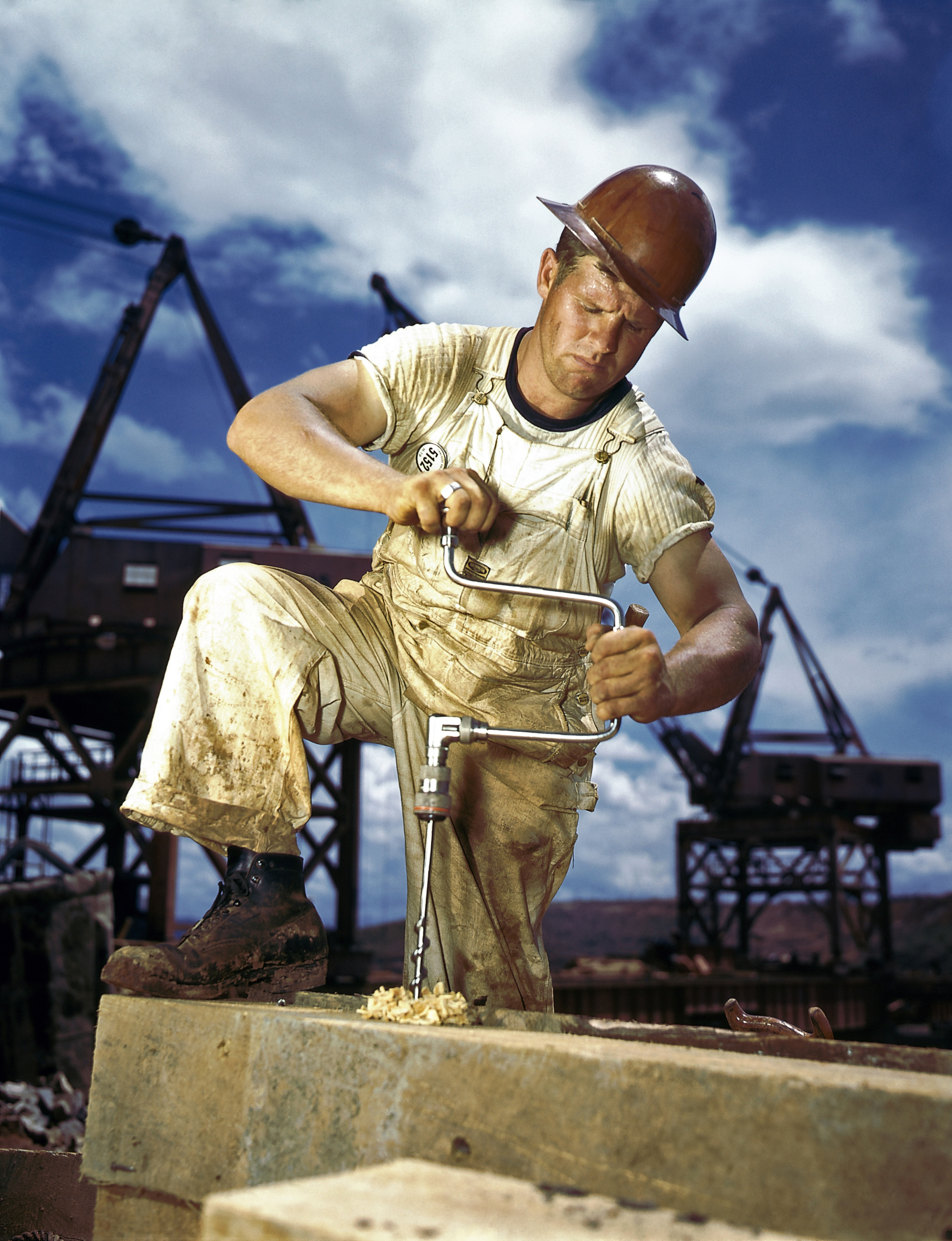
Construction worker wearing an MSA Skullgard hard hat at Douglas Dam, Tennessee (TVA), 1942

Mine Safety Appliances, or MSA Safety Incorporated, is an American manufacturer and supplier of safety equipment designed for use in a variety of hazardous conditions in industries such as construction, the military, fire service, and chemical, oil, and gas production. MSA is based in the Pittsburgh suburb of Cranberry.

Best known for its Bakelite Skullgard hard hat, the company’s product line includes gas monitoring and detection instruments, filter-type respirators, gas masks, breathing apparatus used by firefighters, thermal imaging cameras, firefighter helmets, ballistic body armor, military communications systems, a broad range of industrial head and fall protection products, and safety products for Do-It-Yourself consumers.

The corporation's assets are managed through two business segments: MSA North America and MSA International. MSA has sales and manufacturing operations throughout the world and sells products to customers in more than 140 countries. While the majority of MSA's products are available only through distributors, the company does sell head, eye, ear, respiratory and body protection products to individuals through a variety of hardware and home center retail outlets.

== History ==
MSA was founded on June 14, 1914 after development of the Edison Safety Mining Lamp by mining engineer John T. Ryan Sr. and George H. Deike with help from Thomas Edison following a terrible mine explosion in West Virginia in 1912. The mining lamp was a battery-powered headlamp for miners to help prevent methane-related explosions caused by open flame lamps. Since the turn of the 21st century, MSA has seen record sales. Only a small portion of the company's current products involve mining related products. The company’s competitors include Industrial Scientific Corporation, RAE Systems and Dräger.

In May 2026, MSA announced that it would buy Autronica Fire & Security, which sells fire and gas detection systems, for $555 million from Sentinel Capital Partners.

== Products ==
=== Breathing Apparatus ===
Mine Safety Appliances Co. has been manufacturing oxygen breathing apparatus for decades.

Their "Chemox" chemical rebreather, primarily designed for use in mines, has been modified for use on Mount Everest in 1952 and 1986. They are stated to be simple in construction and operation. It is essentially a canister of potassium superoxide connected to one-way flow valves to an air bag and thence to the user, as in Rebreathers whose absorbent releases oxygen hereinabove. There are no controls or operable valves of any kind. Breathing rate controls oxygen production. The main disadvantage is the 4-lbs canisters are good for only about 45-minutes of rapid climbing before another canister must be switched in. The canisters supply about 6 hours of sleeping oxygen.

=== Hard hats ===
MSA also produces protective hard hats. MSA went on to produce a lighter and more streamlined helmet known as the "Topgard" in the 1960s. MSA brand firefighting helmets were notably used by the Los Angeles County Fire Department and were seen regularly on 1970s TV shows.

MSA continues to manufacture firefighting protective helmets and in 2000 acquired competitor, Cairns Helmets.

== Sites ==
- MSA Corporate Center – Cranberry Township, Pennsylvania
- John T. Ryan Memorial Lab – Cranberry Township, Pennsylvania
- Murrysville, Pennsylvania – Murrysville, Pennsylvania
- Jacksonville, North Carolina – Jacksonville, North Carolina
- Lake Forest, California – Lake Forest, California
- Toronto, Ontario – Toronto, Ontario
- Edmonton, Alberta – Edmonton, Alberta
- MSA General Monitors - Galway, Ireland
