= Restore America's Estuaries =

U.S. non-profit organization

- Founded: 1994
- Type: non-profit
- Purpose: Environmentalism
- Location: Washington, D.C., United States
- Region served: United States
- Method: Education, training, research, lobbying
- Volunteers: Over 300,000
- Website: estuaries.org

Restore America's Estuaries (RAE) is a national 501(c)(3) non-profit conservation organization dedicated to preserving the nation's network of estuaries through coastal protection and restoration projects which promote the richness and diversity of coastal life. Based in Washington, D.C., with staff in Seattle, Colorado, and Florida, Restore America's Estuaries is an alliance of eleven community-based coastal conservation organizations that includes the American Littoral Society (ALS), Chesapeake Bay Foundation (CBF), Coalition to Restore Coastal Louisiana (CRCL), Conservation Law Foundation (CLF), Galveston Bay Foundation (GBF), North Carolina Coastal Federation (NCCF), Save The Bay – San Francisco (STB-SF), EarthCorps, Save The Bay – Narragansett Bay (STB-NB), Save the Sound (STS) - a program of Connecticut Fund for the Environment, and Tampa Bay Watch (TBW).

Restore America's Estuaries works with community, private, and governmental organizations at the national, state, and local level to build partnerships and secure resources to restore and preserve estuarine habitats. Its sphere of work includes supporting on-the-ground community-based restoration projects, creating tools and resources to guide the restoration process, and, engaging and uniting key stakeholders in a biennial national conference and through outreach efforts.

Since its creation in 1994, RAE and its members have restored more than 56,000 acres (230 km^{2}) of coastal habitat, yielding countless benefits to vital food supplies, human health, job creation, and quality of life. This work has been accomplished by raising and leveraging more than $25 million in funding for habitat restoration, resulting in the completion of more than 800 local restoration projects throughout the U.S. In addition, over 300,000 volunteers have contributed toward the restoration effort.

== History ==
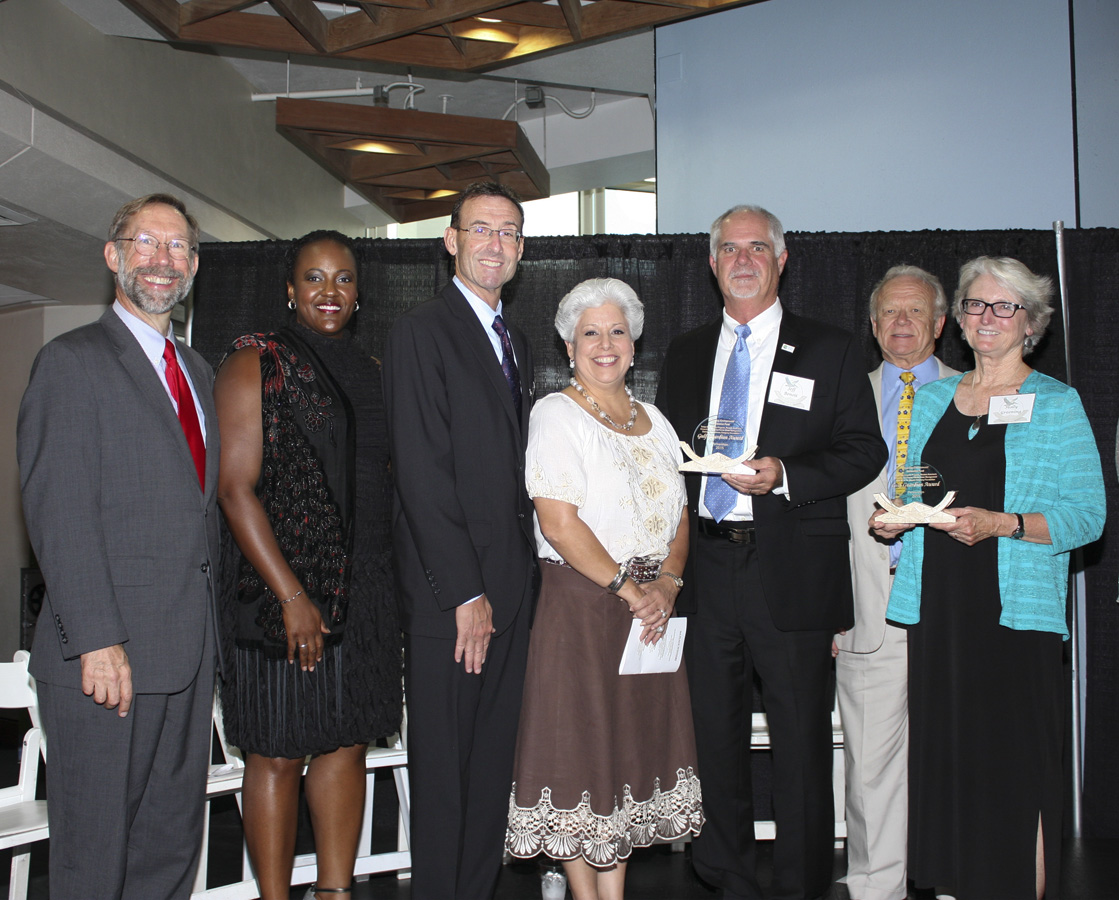
Restore America's Estuaries (represented by then-President Jeff Benoit, third from right) was recognized by the Environmental Protection Agency in 2012 for its Tampa Bay Estuary Program.

In 1994, Pew Charitable Trusts conceived an initiative that would link coastal organizations across the United States and work on the national level to further empower them at the local level. Eight existing coastal organizations (ALS, CLF, CBF, CRCL, NCCF, PFPS, STB-SF, STB-NB) were invited to attend a meeting in Philadelphia. The group decided that on-the-ground habitat restoration of coasts and estuaries would be the most effective focus on which to work together. Soon after, these eight non-profit organizations, along with GBF, created Restore America's Estuaries. In 1997, two more organizations, TBW and STS, joined.

Restore America's Estuaries operated from the American Littoral Society offices until December 14, 1999, when it became incorporated. In June 2000, the IRS granted Restore America's Estuaries 501(c)(3) status.

=== Timeline of RAE history ===
1994	PEW Charitable Trust begins work on an initiative that ties together existing coastal organizations at the national level in order to strengthen the organizations by creating networks and connections that would benefit local and state level activities. PEW convenes a meeting of invited organizations in Philadelphia. They decide to create a national organization focused on conducting coastal habitat restoration. First meeting included ALS, CLF, CBF, CRCL, NCCF, PFPS, STB-SF, and STB-NB. GBF, STS, and TBW were invited to join following the first meeting.
August 1995	First Executive Director hired; First meeting held and name, mission, structure established. Official date of establishing Restore America's Estuaries, but ALS acts as the administrative/financial organization.
December 1999	RAE Incorporated in Virginia
March 2000	Principles of Estuarine Habitat Restoration published in partnership with Estuarine Research Federation.
May 2000	First NOAA/RAE Partnership Agreement
June 2000	RAE receives IRS 501(c)(3) status
November 2000	Estuary Restoration Act signed into law
April 2002	Release of National Strategy to Restore Coastal and Estuarine Habitat
November 2003	Inaugural Conference on Coastal and Estuarine Habitat Restoration - Baltimore, Maryland
September 2004	2nd National Conference - Seattle, Washington
December 2006	3rd National Conference - New Orleans, Louisiana
November 2007	Estuary Restoration Act (ERA) reauthorized in Water Resources Development Act of 2007 (WRDA)
October 2008	4th National Conference – Providence, Rhode Island
September 2009	RAE adopts new logo
February 2010	"Hope for Habitats" published
August 2010	"Action Plan for the Development of a National Greenhouse Gas Offset Protocol for Tidal Wetland Restoration and Management" Published
November 2010	5th National Conference – Galveston, Texas
September 2011	"Jobs and Dollars" Published
May 2012	"Climate-Adapt-Mitigate" Published
October 2012	6th National Conference - Tampa, Florida
March 2014	EarthCorps replaces People for Puget Sound in RAE Alliance
November 2014	7th National Summit (aka conference) in Partnership with the Coastal Society - National Harbor, Maryland

== Member organizations ==
Eleven coastal conservation organizations located across America's coastlines make up Restore America's Estuaries. They are the primary partners and recipients of support from the organization. The Executive Director, President, or a Vice President from each organization sits on the Restore America's Estuaries' Board of Directors.

- American Littoral Society
- Chesapeake Bay Foundation
- Coalition to Restore Coastal Louisiana
- Conservation Law Foundation
- Galveston Bay Foundation
- North Carolina Coastal Federation
- Save The Bay - Narragansett Bay
- Save The Bay - San Francisco
- Save the Sound - a program of Connecticut Fund for the Environment
- Tampa Bay Watch
- EarthCorps

== Community-based restoration ==
Restore America's Estuaries engages in projects involving government, corporate, and non-governmental stakeholders at all levels to facilitate the process of coastal restoration. Community-based restoration projects represent Restore America's Estuaries' commitment to working with local stakeholders and volunteers. These efforts implement on-the-ground restoration projects that rely on community volunteerism and scientific design. Projects include planting salt marsh grasses, removing invasive species, stabilizing stream banks, growing and distributing shellfish, and installing oyster reef substrate in coastal habitats such as Coastal Louisiana, Chesapeake Bay, North Carolina and East Bay, Texas.

== Advocacy ==
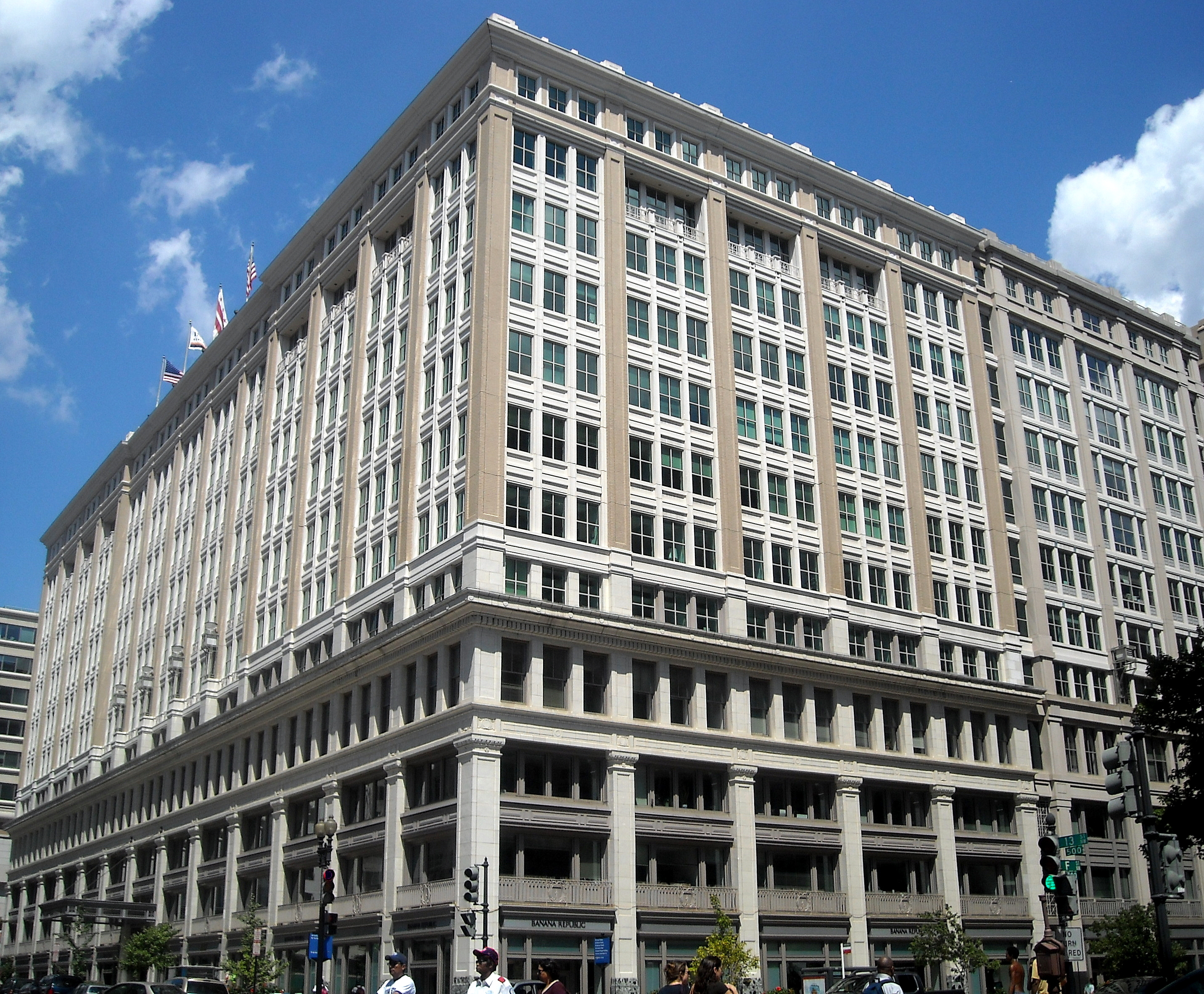
Restore America's Estuaries is headquartered at 601 13th Street NW in Washington, D.C.

Restore America's Estuaries works with government agencies and Congress to develop more effective coastal habitat protection and restoration policies. In its first major legislative victory, RAE led efforts to successfully advocate for Congressional passage of the Estuary Restoration Act, which was signed into law on November 7, 2000. More recently, in 2009 Restore America's Estuaries successfully led efforts to advocate for habitat restoration funding in the American Recovery and Reinvestment Act, resulting in $167 million for the National Oceanic and Atmospheric Administration's Restoration Center. Also in 2009, Restore America's Estuaries established the HabNet Coalition, a group of more than 50 conservation organizations that are leading advocacy efforts in support of the U.S. Fish and Wildlife Service's Coastal Program, including Congressional authorization of the program. In addition, Restore America's Estuaries and its member organizations are advocating for passage of numerous regional estuary restoration bills in Congress, and annually organize events and legislation in support of National Estuaries Day.

== Convening the coastal and estuarine habitat community ==
Restore America's Estuaries also convenes the broader coastal and estuarine habitat restoration community by fostering dialogue; by seeking out and establishing partnerships that help build capacity and advance the practice of restoration; and by identifying and exploring emerging issues important to the community. As a convener, its intent is to objectively create an open dialogue with the multitude of diverse interests involved with, or affecting, coastal habitats. Restore America's Estuaries hosts a biennial National Conference and Expo on Coastal and Estuarine Habitat Restoration to convene government, corporate, and non-governmental stakeholders in an effort to facilitate information sharing about coastal issues and discuss concerns/solutions about environmental challenges.

The Inaugural Conference on Coastal and Estuarine Habitat Restoration was held in April 2003 in Baltimore, Maryland. Since that time, conferences have been held in 2004 (Seattle), 2006 (New Orleans), and 2008 (Providence, Rhode Island).

The 5th National Conference, Preparing for Climate Change: Science, Practice, and Policy, will be hosted at the Galveston Island Convention Center in Galveston Texas, November 13–17, 2010. Restore America's Estuaries expects more than 1,000 attendees, 150 exhibitors, 160 poster presentations, and 400 presenters in 80-plus sessions dealing with the newest approaches to coastal habitat preservation and restoration.

== Issues addressed ==
In the ongoing effort to protect coastlines, RAE has recognized the importance of certain economic and ecological issues that take priority when supporting and funding restoration projects. These issues largely guide RAE's focus and its mission.

=== Socioeconomics of estuaries ===
A major element that RAE emphasizes is the value of estuaries to individuals. Estuaries are the breeding grounds for much commercially and recreationally fished wildlife, contributing billions of dollars and millions of jobs to the U.S. economy each year. They are tourism and cultural centers as well as the sites of major urban areas. Estuaries also provide a number of ecosystem services including pollutant filtration, storm surge control, and shoreline stabilization. Restoring natural biological functions to coastlines therefore has the potential to improve water quality, human health, and coastal economies.

=== Combating climate change ===
RAE also has focused on the impacts of climate change to America's coastal landscape and the ways in which restoration can mitigate these effects. In April 2010, RAE hosted a Blue Ribbon Panel of experts to advise the development of a greenhouse gas emissions offset protocol that would include the restoration of tidal wetlands, marshes, and mangrove forests. The organization is currently exploring ways in which estuary restoration can be used as a carbon sequestration tool to remove a portion of the greenhouse gases that are being emitted into the atmosphere.

== Publications ==
In addition to supporting on-the-ground restoration projects, RAE also focuses on education and information sharing. RAE has published multiple resources detailing the current state of coastal habitats as well as possible solutions to current environmental problems.

=== Hope for Coastal Habitats ===
The Hope for Coastal Habitats report highlights the importance of individual volunteerism to restoration efforts and documents various success stories in which individuals became personally involved in their environments. The various projects that RAE has been involved in include wetlands, oyster reef, eelgrass, and fish passage restoration.

=== Economic value of coasts and estuaries ===
Aided by economist Linwood Pendleton, RAE published a report that quantifies the dollar value of U.S. estuaries to the national economy. The report found that healthy coasts and estuaries are necessary to protect "more than $800 billion in trade each year, tens of billions of dollars in recreational opportunities annually, and more than 45 percent of the nation's petroleum refining capacity."

=== A National Strategy to Restore Coastal and Estuarine Habitat ===
Published in 2002, the National Strategy to Restore Coastal and Estuarine Habitat provides a framework for restoring the natural biological functions of coastlines and estuaries. It outlines a set of principles of strategies consistent with the goals of the Estuary Restoration Act of 2000 that can be applied to restoration projects nationwide.

=== Principles of Estuarine Habitat Restoration ===
As a result of a collaboration between scientists and field practitioners, RAE developed a guide to for estuarine habitat restoration consisting of a set of best practices. The report outlines the key components of successful restoration projects in the areas of context, planning, design, and implementation.
