= Rina =

Rina or RINA may refer to:

== People and fictional characters ==
- Rina (given name), a list of people and fictional characters
- Kento Rina, Indian politician
- Mahfuza Rahman Rina, Bangladeshi politician
- Tongam Rina (born 1979), Indian journalist and human rights activist
- Ita Rina, stage name of Yugoslav actress Tamara Đorđević (1907–1979)
- Rina (rapper), Kosovo-Albanian rapper, singer and songwriter Rina Balaj
- A member of South Korean girl group Weki Meki
- Rina (wrestler), Japanese professional wrestler

== Acronyms ==
- Recursive Internetwork Architecture, a computer network architecture proposed as an alternative to the TCP/IP model
- Registro Italiano Navale, the Italian shipping register
- Royal Institution of Naval Architects, London

== Other uses ==
- Rina (EP), the debut extended play by British-Japanese singer Rina Sawayama
- Rina (TV series), a Mexican telenovela, or its main character
- Hurricane Rina (2011), which made landfall in the Yucatan Peninsula
- Tropical Storm Rina (2017), which formed in the Central Atlantic

== See also ==
- Reena (disambiguation)
- Rinə, Azerbaijan, a village and municipality
- Salvatore Riina (1930–2017), leader of the Sicilian Mafia
