= Lionel Walford =

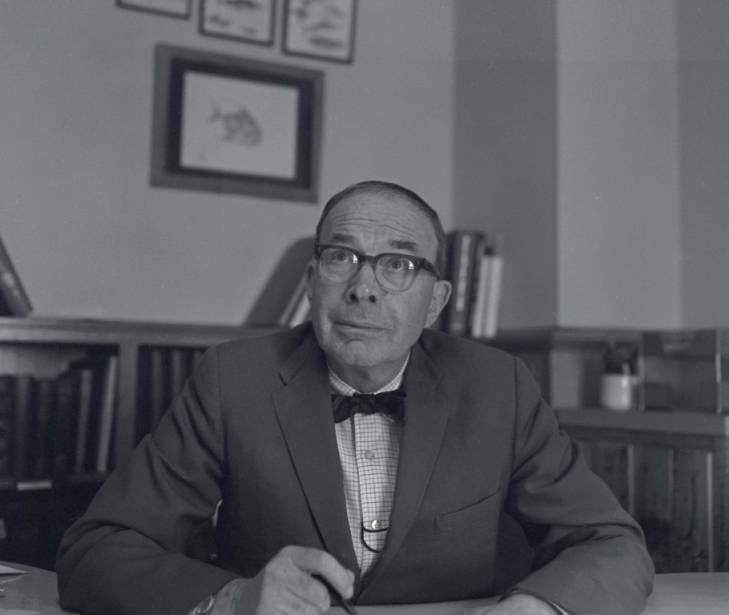
Dr. Lionel Walford was the Director of the Sandy Hook Marine Laboratory from 1961 to 1971.

Lionel Walford (May 29, 1905 - April 9, 1979) was a marine biologist and director of the Sandy Hook Marine Laboratory from 1960 to 1971. He advised several international fishery commissions and authored "Game Fishes of the Pacific Coast from Alaska to the Equator," "Living Resources of the Sea", and "Angler's Guide to the United States Atlantic Coast" (with Bruce L. Freeman).

Walford was a participant in the 1963 Conservation Foundation conference "Implications of rising carbon dioxide content of the atmosphere" and contributed to the subsequent ground-breaking report edited by Neil Eichhorn. He also founded the American Littoral Society to help communicate science to the public.

== Bibliography ==
Lionel A. Walford (January 1, 1939). Marine Game Fishes of the Pacific Coast from Alaska to the Equator. Berkeley: Univ. of California Press.

Lionel A. Walford (1958). Living Resources of the Sea. Ronald Press Company.

Freeman, Bruce; Walford, Lionel (1974). Angler's Guide to the United States Atlantic Coast. National Marine Fisheries Service.
