= Reena =

Reena may refer to:

- Reena (given name), including a list of people with the name
  - Reena (actress), Indian film actress in Malayalam films
  - Reena Virk, Indian-Canadian murder victim
  - Reena Malhotra, character in the 2001 Indian film Rehnaa Hai Terre Dil Mein, played by Dia Mirza
  - Reena Desai, a character in the Indian KGF (film series)
- Camps Mohican Reena, sleepaway camps in Massachusetts

== See also ==
- Rina (disambiguation)
