= Hard hat mounted mirror =

Safety accessory

A hard hat mounted mirror is a safety device attached to a hard hat that provides an increased field-of-view.

== History ==
Headgear mounted mirrors were first developed in the early 1970s as a bicycle safety accessory by a dentist, Dr. Jack Greenlaw, who suggested using small, round dental mirrors mounted on headgear as safety devices. Demand for the mirror exceeded his ability to manufacture them by hand, resulting in outsourcing the manufacturing to that of injection molded plastic. Several other brands followed, initially designed for the bicycle industry then later as an industrial and tactical device. The success of mirrors mounted on bicycle helmets continued for decades, finally being adopted by construction and industrial workers as a safety device, on helmets of snowmobilers (3), and in tactical environments like Airsoft and SWAT applications adding a similar level of safety as mirrors on vehicles.

== Features ==
Hard hat mirrors are typically very small due to the close visual proximity and are made of ABS plastic with a reflective surface of either glass or acrylic. Some headgear-mounted mirrors are held permanently in place with adhesives although ones designed specifically for industrial applications are mechanically attached and are therefore removable and have a higher degree of adjustability. They also have hinged joints for adjustability and to be able to be completely moved out of the way of peripheral view when desired. The reflective surfaces are typically between one and just over two square inches of surface area.

They are used in dangerous workplace environments by pedestrian workers or by operators of small equipment like jackhammers and concrete saws, who are susceptible to being hit or struck from behind. This type of fatality, on average, is about 40 per year in the US over the last 10 years. They are usually an optional device and not a required piece of personal protective equipment, though they have been recommended by the National Institute for Occupational Safety and Health (NIOSH) and the state of Washington. Hard hat mirrors are used as an alternative to additional employees known as "spotters" acting as an observer during especially dangerous activities.

In 2000, Washington State's Department of Labor and Industries carried out a study of hard hat mounted mirrors' effectiveness as a run-over and back-over safety device, entitled "Optical Properties of Plane and Convex Mirrors: Can Mirrors Be Used to Enhance Construction Flaggers' Safety?" The report concluded that: "Given that image perception is a problem with small-radius-of-curvature convex mirrors and that it is difficult for a flagger to view the flagpole mirror and keep an eye on traffic in front of them, helmet mirrors have been found to be the best option for flaggers."
