= Ray Brown (designer) =

Australian tailor and clothing designer

Ray Brown (born 27 September 1959) is an Australian tailor and clothing designer. He has designed custom clothing for numerous celebrity rock musicians, and operates his own brand for stage wear, It's a Ray!

== Early life ==
Brown was born in Darwin, Australia to Ron Brown, a labor rights activist for the building trades, and Clarice Brown, a housewife. As a child, Brown learned carpentry from his father. He completed a four-year training course in shop fitting which included carpentry. When he was fifteen years old, Brown used his mother's sewing machine to re-design the jeans he had bought in local shops.

== Melbourne and London ==
Brown relocated to Melbourne, and worked as a designer in a leather store. He was later promoted to a partner in the business, but eventually left to open a Western-style clothing store after seeing the Nudie Cohn-designed shirts worn by Elvis Presley.

Brown relocated to London, where he rented rooms in the Rainbow Theatre. He continued making custom hand-coloured Western-style shirts, which he sold through King's Road boutiques. Just before shipping a large order to Germany, thieves broke into his room during a Bob Marley concert show and stole the order. When Brown complained about the security to the management of The Rainbow, he was given the job of caretaker of the building, which required him to live in a flat at the top of the theatre. He continued making clothing and was promoted to Front of House manager.

While living and working there he became friends with John Lydon, then known as Johnny Rotten, singer of the Sex Pistols. After the Sex Pistols broke up, Lydon formed Public Image Ltd ( PIL) and wanted his first UK shows with the new band to be at the Rainbow. Brown helped him organize to have the seats removed from the downstairs area of the Theatre for PIL's first London performances in December 1978.

He began making outfits for musicians including Australians Bon Scott and the Little River Band, as well as Adam Ant and the British rock group Charlie. When the Rainbow's lease was coming to an end, the extensive renovations the building needed were precluded by a preservation order, and Brown left.

== Los Angeles ==
Brown moved to Los Angeles with 300 US dollars in his pocket. He rented a room in Hollywood and began making jeans on a rented sewing machine.

His first commission was for video producer Jerry Kramer. When Brown delivered the jeans to the studio where Kramer was editing a Styx video he met the band's guitarist Tommy Shaw. Of similar stature to Brown, Shaw complained of the difficulty he had in finding stageworthy clothing that fit. Shaw commissioned Brown to make his red jumpsuit, and then flew him to Chicago, where he was commissioned to make all the clothing for the band's upcoming Paradise Theatre tour, which began in early 1981.

Brown's next clients included Ozzy Osbourne, the band Judas Priest, Cher, The Pointer Sisters, Barry Manilow, and Brian Setzer. He also created off-stage wear for a number of his clients, including wedding outfits for Jon Bon Jovi, Vince Neil, Tommy Lee and John Mellencamp, as well as a black wedding dress for the cover of Lita Ford's never-completed The Bride Wore Black album. He created an elaborate diamond-studded leather jacket for the film This Is Spinal Tap, and in 1998 designed and made the first jackets for the then-new Arizona Diamondbacks baseball team.

Brown designed his clothes to be durable enough for use onstage . After Graham Bonnet ripped one of his suits onstage with Brown in the audience, Brown developed techniques aimed to ensure that his clothing would not come apart during live performances. When Bruce Dickinson attempted onstage to rip the sleeves from a new shirt made by Brown, the sleeves repeatedly failed to come away in front of several thousand people.

Brown began working with a new type of washable synthetic leather, which he found to be more durable than real leather, and less likely to rip. If the fabric got baggy at the joints, this could be easily remedied by washing it in a washing machine. Bands that preferred real leather such as Mötley Crüe and Judas Priest were not wearing real leather at all while touring.

He developed a pyramid-studded type of leather with Judas Priest, and was the first to design for artists like Mötley Crüe leather clothing with skulls and crosses, commonly used as ornaments on leather today. He invented lace front leather pants for Jon Bon Jovi; lacing up the side of leather pants for Mötley Crüe, and large banners on the backs of jackets and coats, not seen outside of motorcycle gangs before the concept was developed with Mötley Crüe. Early adopters included Axl Rose and Jon Bon Jovi. One jacket he designed for Jon Bon Jovi was exhibited in The Smithsonian.

== Present day ==
Brown relocated to London in August 2008, where he has created tour clothing for The Struts, Muse, the Arctic Monkeys' singer Alex Turner, Liverpool mod Miles Kane, Jamiroquai, Rival Sons, The Darkness, Lady Starlight, and Thirty Seconds to Mars' singer Jared Leto.

He made the outfit for Lady Gaga for her performance with the Rolling Stones in New Jersey on 16 December 2012.

On Brown's work, Tony Iommi, Black Sabbath guitarist said in 2007,

"Considering Ray only has one color (black) to work with when designing my clothes, he is always able to come-up with interesting and adventurous pieces. For over 25 years Ray has been creating my outfits for both on and off stage, yet he is still able to produce new ideas and concepts."

== Exhibitions ==
Brown's work has been featured in exhibitions and books on the style and fashion of rock and roll. Four of his outfits were featured in Tommy Hilfiger's book Rock Style: How Fashion Moves to Music. Outfits made for Bon Jovi, Tony Iommi and Brian Setzer are with the Rock and Roll Hall of Fame. His work was displayed in the Phoenix Art Museum's 1997 exhibit commemorating 1980s rock fashion:

- Judas Priest: Jacket (1991)
- Nelson Twins: Jacket, Vest and Pants (1992)
- Cher: Pair of Jeans (1993)
- Yngwie Malmsteen: Jacket (1994)

In June 2011 the Birmingham Museum and Art Gallery featured a display called "Home of Metal", featuring music from Birmingham and the Black Country. Of the four bands featured, Judas Priest and Black Sabbath had been clients of Brown's for 29 years. Clothing made by Brown for these two bands, plus design sketches, were part of the exhibit.

His outfits are displayed in several Hard Rock Cafes:

- Mumbai, India, Alice Cooper display:; White Tux & Tails Used on every tour from 1986 until some fairly recent shows in North America in 1998. Worn at each concert during the performance of 'School's Out'. Can be seen on the front cover of the video 'Prime Cuts' and in the 'Alice Cooper - Trashes the World' concert video.
- Munich, Germany: Nikki Sixx display:; Black and White Polka Dotted Outfit from "Theatre of Pain" Tour
