= Rae Bernstein =

American pianist (1904–1999)

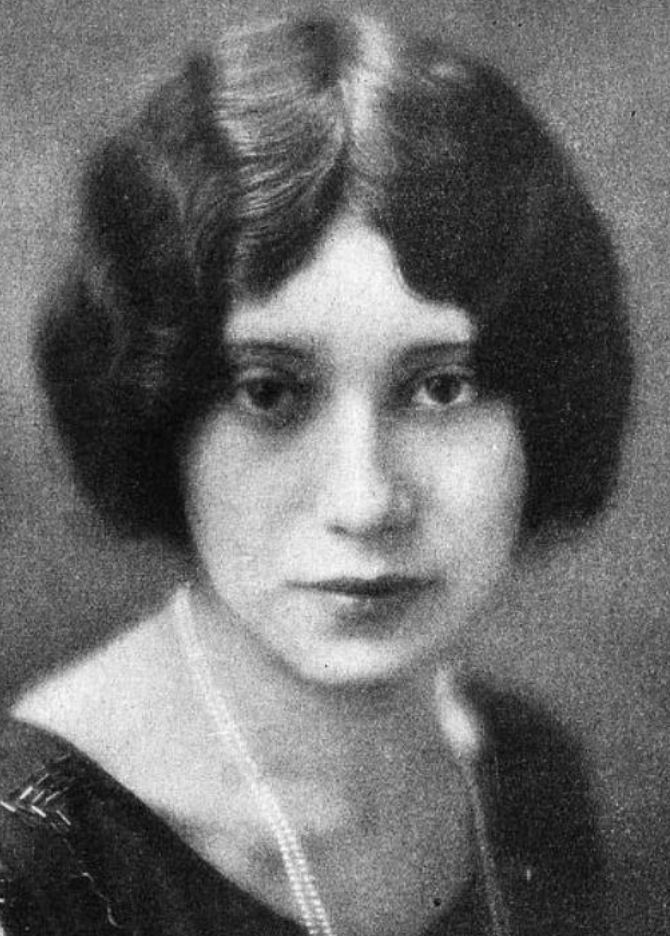
- Rae Bernstein, from a 1927 publication
- Born: April 14, 1904; London, England
- Died: June 11, 1999 (age 95); Evanston, Illinois, U.S.
- Other names: Rae Best, Rose Best
- Occupation: Pianist

Rae Bernstein Best (April 14, 1904 – June 11, 1999) was an American pianist, based in Chicago. She was called the "second Fannie Bloomfield-Zeisler" by Chicago music critic Herman Devries.

== Early life and education ==
Bernstein was born in London and raised in Chicago, the daughter of Gershon (George) H. Bernstein and Sarah Efron Bernstein. Her parents were both Jewish immigrants from the Russian Empire, and her home language was Yiddish. Her father was composer, choir master, and cantor at a synagogue, and he recognized her musical aptitude when she was young. Her impoverished childhood was frequently mentioned in publicity. She studied piano with Glenn Dillard Gunn. She won a scholarship to Juilliard in 1926 and studied with Arthur Freidham.

== Career ==
Bernstein played piano in movie houses, and on WGN radio, as a teenager. She was soon hailed as a "genius", and compared to Fanny Bloomfield-Zeisler. She toured with Rosa Raisa in 1925 and 1926. She performed with the Women's Symphony Orchestra of Chicago, and as a soloist with the Chicago Symphony Orchestra. She was especially known for playing works by Beethoven and Chopin. "Her playing is so full of magnetism and vividness that no audience, even an unmusical one, could help sharing her appreciation of the musical beauties which she was showing them," wrote one reviewer of Bernstein's performances in North Dakota in 1928.

Bernstein also taught piano classes at the northwest branch of the Jewish People's Institute in Chicago. She continued to play occasionally for audiences in the 1930s, after she had married and moved away from Chicago. She joined the teaching staff at the School of Radio Arts in Los Angeles in 1940.

== Personal life ==
Bernstein married physician Albert A. Best. They lived in Spokane in 1935, and in Los Angeles by 1940; Dr. Best was a surgeon in Hollywood, where their daughter Davida was born in 1944. Rae Best died in 1999, at the age of 95, in Evanston, Illinois.
