= Reena (given name) =

Reena is a given name and a variant of Rena

Notable people with the given name include:

- Nisha (actress), Indian film actress in Malayalam films
- Reena Bhardwaj, British Indian singer, songwriter and recording artist
- Reena Kaushal Dharmshaktu, first Indian woman to ski to the South Pole
- Reena Saini Kallat, Indian artist
- Reena Kumari (archer), Indian athlete
- Reena Ninan, American television journalist
- Reena Raggi, US federal judge
- Reena Roy, Hindi film actress
