= RAE Systems =

American industrial company

- Type: Subsidiary
- Industry: Gas detection systems, Industrial, Oil & Gas, Fire/HazMat Safety equipment
- Founded: 1991; 35 years ago
- Founder: Robert I. Chen, Peter Hsi
- Headquarters: San Jose, California, U.S.
- Area served: World Wide
- Products: Wireless personal, area, transportable and fixed gas and radiation detection systems
- Parent: Honeywell
- Website: www.raesystems.com

RAE Systems, Inc., or RAE System by Honeywell, is a provider of wireless, gas and radiation detection instruments and systems that enable real-time safety and security threat detection to help mitigate risk, and protect workers, contractors, the public, and assets. RAE Systems is located in San Jose, California. The company was founded in 1991 by Robert I. Chen and Peter Hsi.

The company's competitors include Ion Science Ltd, Mine Safety Appliances, Industrial Scientific Corporation, and Dräger. Some of its customers include BP, Chevron Corporation, and Total Petroleum in the energy sector; United States Air Force, United States Navy, and United States Department of Homeland Security in the government sector; DuPont and Formosa Plastics Corp in other industry sectors.

== History ==
Robert I. Chen and Peter Hsi founded RAE Systems in 1991 to apply sensor technology to monitor toxic chemicals for environmental, industrial safety, energy, hazardous material (HazMat), emergency response, and government applications. The co-founders started the company after selling Applied Optoelectronic Technology Corporation, a manufacturer of computer-aided test systems, to Hewlett-Packard.

In 2013, the company's detectors were used in 120 countries by industrial organizations, emergency responders, and government agencies. In April 2013, the company was acquired by Honeywell.

== Technology ==
The company holds over 40 chemical sensor patents in the detection-sensor field, which include patents for photoionization, wireless, and radiation technologies. The company's offerings include wirelessly-enabled technologies for emergency response, national security, CBRNE agent detection, fire, and military end user applications. Also, the company has products for real-time detection of unseen threats such as radiation, chemical warfare agents (CWA), and toxic and combustible gases.

With its photoionization technology, the company provides photoionization detector (PID) that can help safety professionals monitor and measure volatile organic compounds (VOCs), combustible gases and vapors, and toxic gases. With its wireless and radiation technologies, the company developed portable devices that are able to detect low-level radiation in real-time, as well as dosimeters that can detect dose rates and help protect industrial workers from radiation exposure. RAE Systems wireless gas detection systems enable incident commanders to extend monitoring capabilities and share critical data in real time as emergencies unfold.

The company also incorporates wireless communication and data transmission capabilities into its offerings. In 2001, RAE Systems introduced its first wireless data transmission product. In the first quarter of 2012, the ProRAE Guardian was launched, enabling access to real-time data on toxic gases and radiation, combined with the physiological status and location of workers and emergency response teams. In January 2012, the company released its cloud-based service, called ProRAE Guardian CloudServer, for first responders to detect hazardous threats in real-time and to share gas and radiation data globally. This service helps emergency response teams shorten the time to analyze threats and make decisions.

== Industries ==
The company serves five industries, including energy exploration and refining/oil and gas, industrial safety, national security, fire and HazMat, and the environmental market.

The energy exploration and refining/oil and gas sector requires process measurements and safety alert systems to address worldwide industrial incidents, like the 2010 catastrophic explosion of the Deepwater Horizon oil rig and Total's Elgin platform gas leak in March 2012. The company's monitors are utilized by energy companies for exploration, refining as well as downstream monitoring and safety.

In the industrial safety market, there is an increasing awareness that long-term exposure to even very low concentrations of toxic or hazardous gases can adversely affect workers’ health. Businesses and organizations require ongoing monitoring and detection to assess the acceptable level of toxic gas exposure for personnel.

In the oil and gas, industrial production, fire and HazMat, national security, and environmental industries, the company's products are deployed by first responders to improve public protection and reduce response times.

Additionally, the company's offerings, like its AreaRAE wireless monitoring system, are utilized for risk management, asset security, and employee well-being by international organizations and sports venues such as the Super Bowl, World Series games, NBA championship, and Government conventions. The company's sensors were also deployed at the London 2012 Olympics and other international table tennis tournaments, where the International Table Tennis Federation (ITFF) asked RAE Systems to provide sensors to test paddles.
