= American Littoral Society =

American conservation, research, and education organization

The American Littoral Society is an American conservation, research, and education organization focused on the Intertidal zone and coastal habitats. It was founded in 1961 and is headquartered on Sandy Hook in New Jersey in a building that was formerly Army barracks.

The American Littoral Society was founded in 1961 by marine biologists Lionel Walford and John R. Clark, who were director and assistant director, respectively, of the Sandy Hook Marine Laboratory. It was a way to engage the public and manage volunteer efforts, beginning with a group of skin divers who had been volunteering for the laboratory. Its focus is on conservation, education, research, and advocacy to protect coastal habitats (the word littoral, from Late Latin littoralis, means "related to the shore"). Some members are people like fishers whose professions depend on a healthy ecosystem, some are marine biologists or other scientists, and many are amateur naturalists, divers, and conservationists. Its headquarters is on Sandy Hook in New Jersey in a building that was formerly Army barracks.

== History ==
An early project for the organization was to protect the USS California (ACR-6), a cruiser that was sunk during World War I, by a torpedo from a German submarine, a few miles from Long Island. Shipwrecks provide useful structures for marine life, and the littoral society set out to prevent the salvage operation. In 1963, the organization raised funds to conduct an inventory of shipwrecks along the US coasts with the aim of protecting them, working with various fishing organizations which supported the goal because the shipwrecks attract game fish.

In 1966 the organization selected a porpoise to represent it, chosen as a likeable animal which might do for their cause what Smokey the Bear did for the U.S. Forest Service. In the late 1960s it launched an initiative to raise awareness and promote protection of estuarine areas along the Atlantic Coast.

In New Jersey, it helped to pass multiple pieces of conservation legislation. The Major Coastal Area Facility Review Acts declares the state's coastal waters a "unique and irreplaceable resource" and requires potential developers to secure permits to build on the coast. It also required a coastal inventory and the preparation of an environmental strategy. The Freshwater Wetlands Protection Act of 1987 extended state and federal protections of waterways from coastal and navigable waters to freshwater wetlands, stopping "unnecessary or undesirable alteration or disturbance".

In 1978, when groynes and jetties were the most common ways to repair beaches and limit the amount of sediment movement, the Littoral Society advocated a form of beach repair: piping the ocean floor from 2–3,000 feet from the shore onto the beach to replace lost sand.

In the 1980s, the organization worked with Greenpeace to protest NL Industries, which dumped more waste into the Atlantic Ocean than any other company. It ran its first New York beach cleanup in 1985.

In the 1990s, when the state of New Jersey began issuing fines to people fishing and crabbing in Newark Bay and the Hackensack River, where it was illegal due to pollution, the Littoral Society argued the fines were unfair when the state was not taking sufficient action to require companies that created the pollution to work to fix it.

== Activities ==
The focus of the organization's activities are coasts between high- and low-tide and all of the estuaries, tide pools, and other features and wildlife in that zone. Its educational programs include hiking and scuba diving field trips, and lectures as well as publishing newsletters and other materials. Its members tag fish to learn about their growth and movement, and conduct research in the service of is legislative conservation goals. According to The New York Times, in 1979 it operated "the nation's largest volunteer fishtagging program", responsible for tagging over 130,000 fish. It has run "fishtagging rodeos" wherein the society teaches people about tagging then fishers compete to see who can catch and tag the most. Some of its events are food themed, with members catching, cooking, and eating fish, mussels, and seaweed.

Since 1985, the organization runs a yearly beach cleanup effort in New York, recruiting thousands of volunteers. It began as a smaller effort focused in New York City but expanded throughout the state. According to the New York Times, 5,858 people turned out for the 1994 event, cleaning 548 miles of coastline, and picked up over 100,000 pounds of debris. The group catalogs the kinds of waste volunteers pick up, publishing a list. In the 1994 cleanup there were 36,460 cigarettes, for example, with the other common items including plastic wrappers, glass, plastic bags, and straws.

Between May and October, its divers study New Jersey's coasts, producing reports about the range of marine life that exists there and any human-created problems which may have arisen since the previous year. Starting in 1968, it organized a yearly event called "Your Future in the Sea", comprising films, lectures, and panels which share, explain, and promote coastal research and relevant careers. Nelson Bryant of The New York Times credited one of its early symposiums which first raised public awareness of the ecological dangers of the pesticide DDT based on its impact on a Lake Michigan fishery.

Operation Oyster is one of its programs to increase the number of oysters in New Jersey after pollution and other factors significantly reduced populations over previous decades. It also encourages recycling oyster shells, such as those from restaurants, to help restore reefs.

It operates an educational center in Cape May County, New Jersey, the Institute of Coastal Education.
