= Bard (disambiguation) =

A bard is a minstrel in medieval Scottish, Irish, and Welsh societies; and later re-used by romantic writers. For its wider definition including similar roles in other societies, see List of oral repositories.

Bard, BARD, Bård or similar terms may also refer to:

== People ==
- Bard (surname)
- Bård, Norwegian given name and surname

=== "The Bard of..." etc. ===
- William Shakespeare (1564–1616), the Bard of Avon or the Bard
- Robert Burns (1759–1796), the Bard of Ayrshire or the Bard
- Rabindranath Tagore (1861–1941), the Bard of Bengal
- John Cooper Clarke (born 1949), the Bard of Salford
- Richard Llwyd (1752–1835), the Bard of Snowdon
- Thomas Rowley (poet) (1721–1796), the Bard of the Green Mountains
- Robert W. Service (1874–1958), the Bard of the Yukon
- Alasdair mac Mhaighstir Alasdair (c. 1698–1770), the Great Bard

== Fictional characters ==
- Bard the Bowman, a character from J. R. R. Tolkien's novel The Hobbit
- Beedle the Bard, an author of fairy tales in the Harry Potter series

== Places ==
=== In the United States ===
- Bard Peak (Alaska), a summit in the Kenai Mountains
- Bard, California, an unincorporated community
- Bard, Nevada, a ghost town
- Bard, New Mexico, an unincorporated community
- Bard Peak, Colorado, United States

=== In Iran ===
- Bard, Ardabil, Ardabil Province
- Bard, Iran, Mazandaran Province, a village
- Bard Gapi, Izeh County, Khuzestan Province, a village
- Bard Kheymeh, Ramhormoz County, Khuzestan Province, a village
- Bard-e Ghamchī, Andika County, Khuzestan Province, a village

=== Elsewhere ===
- Bard Island, Newfoundland and Labrador, Canada
- Bard, Loire, France
- Bard, Aosta Valley, Italy
  - Fort Bard

== Art ==
- The Bard (Jones), an 1774 painting by Thomas Jones
- The Bard (Martin), an 1817 painting by John Martin

== Literature ==
- The Bard (poem), a 1757 poem by Thomas Gray
- Bard: The Odyssey of the Irish, a 1984 novel by Morgan Llywelyn
- Bard, Bard II, Bard III, Bard IV, Bard V, a series of novels by Keith Taylor
  - Bard (novel), the first one of these novels

== Music ==
- Bard (Soviet Union), genre of music in Russia consisting of singers-songwriters with guitar accompaniment
- The Bard (Sibelius), a 1913 tone poem by Jean Sibelius
- Bard (album), a 2002 album by Big Big Train
- Blind Guardian or the Bards, a power metal/speed metal band
- Bardcore, medievalised remakes of hit pop songs

== In role-playing and video games ==
- Bard (Dungeons & Dragons), a character class in Dungeons & Dragons and the Pathfinder Roleplaying Game

== Schools ==
- Bard College, Annandale-on-Hudson, New York, United States
- Bard College at Simon's Rock, an "early college" in Great Barrington, Massachusetts, United States
- Bard High School Early College, an alternative public secondary school in New York City, United States
- Bard College Berlin, Germany, a private, non-profit institution of higher education

== Other uses ==
- BARD (Braille and Audio Reading Download) service provided by National Library Service for the Blind and Print Disabled
- Bard (chatbot), the former name for Gemini, developed by Google
- Bangladesh Academy for Rural Development, Comilla, Bangladesh
- BARD Offshore 1, a wind farm by BARD Engineering Gmbh
- Barding or bard, armour for horses
- The Bard (American horse), a racehorse
- The Bard (British horse), a racehorse
- "The Bard" (The Twilight Zone), an episode
- C. R. Bard, Inc., a manufacturer of medical equipment
