= Baard =

Baard or Bård may refer to:

== People with the given name ==
- Baard Iversen (1836–1920), Norwegian businessperson and politician
- Baard Madsen Haugland (1835–1896), Norwegian politician
- Baard Owe (1936–2017), Norwegian-born actor
- Baard Slagsvold (born 1963), Norwegian pop and jazz musician
- Bård Eker (born 1961), Norwegian industrial designer and entrepreneur
- Bård Jørgen Elden, Norwegian Nordic combined skier
- Bård Nesteng (born 1979), Norwegian archer

== People with the surname ==
- Frances Baard (1909–1997), South African (ethnic Tswana) trade unionist
- Henricus Petrus Baard (1906–2000), director of the Frans Hals Museum
- Justin Baard (born 1993), Namibian cricketer
- Rachel Baard, South African theologian
- Stephan Baard (born 1992), Namibian cricketer

== Other uses ==
- Baard, Friesland, a town in the Netherlands
- Boston Alliance Against Registration and the Draft (BAARD), anti-draft/anti-registration organization based in Cambridge, United States
- Baard language, an endangered Australian Aboriginal language

== See also ==
- Bard (disambiguation)
