= Bard (surname) =

Bard is a surname. Notable people with the surname include:

- Albert S. Bard (1866–1963), lawyer and civic activist in New York City
- Alexander Bard (born 1961), Swedish philosopher and musician
- Allen J. Bard (1933–2024), American chemist
- Anna Bård (born 1980), Danish actress and model
- Ben Bard (1893–1974), American actor
- Charles Bard, 2nd Viscount Bellomont (1647–1667)
- Daniel Bard (born 1985), American baseball pitcher
- David Bard (1744–1815), United States Representative from Pennsylvania
- Derek Bard (born 1995), American amateur golfer
- Ellen Bard (1949–2009), Republican member of the Pennsylvania House of Representatives
- Guy K. Bard (1895–1953), American judge and politician
- Harry Bard (1867–1955), secretary of the Pan American Society of the United States
- Henri Bard (1892–1951), French footballer
- Henry Bard, 1st Viscount Bellomont (1616–1656), English Royalist
- Howard B. Bard (1870–1954), American Unitarian minister
- James Bard (1815–1897), marine artist
- John Bard (1819–1899), Christian philanthropist
- Joseph Bard (1882–1975), expatriate Hungarian writer
- Josh Bard (born 1978), American baseball catcher and designated hitter
- Katharine Bard (1916–1983), American actress.
- Louis L. Bard, early motion picture theater proprietor
- Luke Bard (born 1990), American baseball player
- Maria Bard (1900–1944), German stage actress
- Mary Bard (1904–1970), 20th-century American author
- Mitchell Bard, American foreign policy analyst
- Perry Bard, interdisciplinary artist
- Ralph Austin Bard (1884–1975), Assistant Secretary of the Navy 1941–1944
- Samuel Bard (physician) (1742–1821)
- Samuel Bard (politician) (1825–1878), Governor of Idaho Territory
- Sydney Bard (born 2001), American ice hockey player
- Thomas R. Bard (1841–1915), American politician from California
- Wilkie Bard (1874–1944), British vaudeville and music hall entertainer
- William Bard (1778–1853), American banker

Fictional characters:

- Eli Bard (born Eliphas), supervillain from the Marvel Comics universe
- Jason Bard, a DC Comics character
- Monica Bard in General Hospital, an American soap opera on the ABC network
