= Siege of Fort Bard =

Military action that took place during May 1800

- Part of the Marengo campaign in the War of the Second Coalition
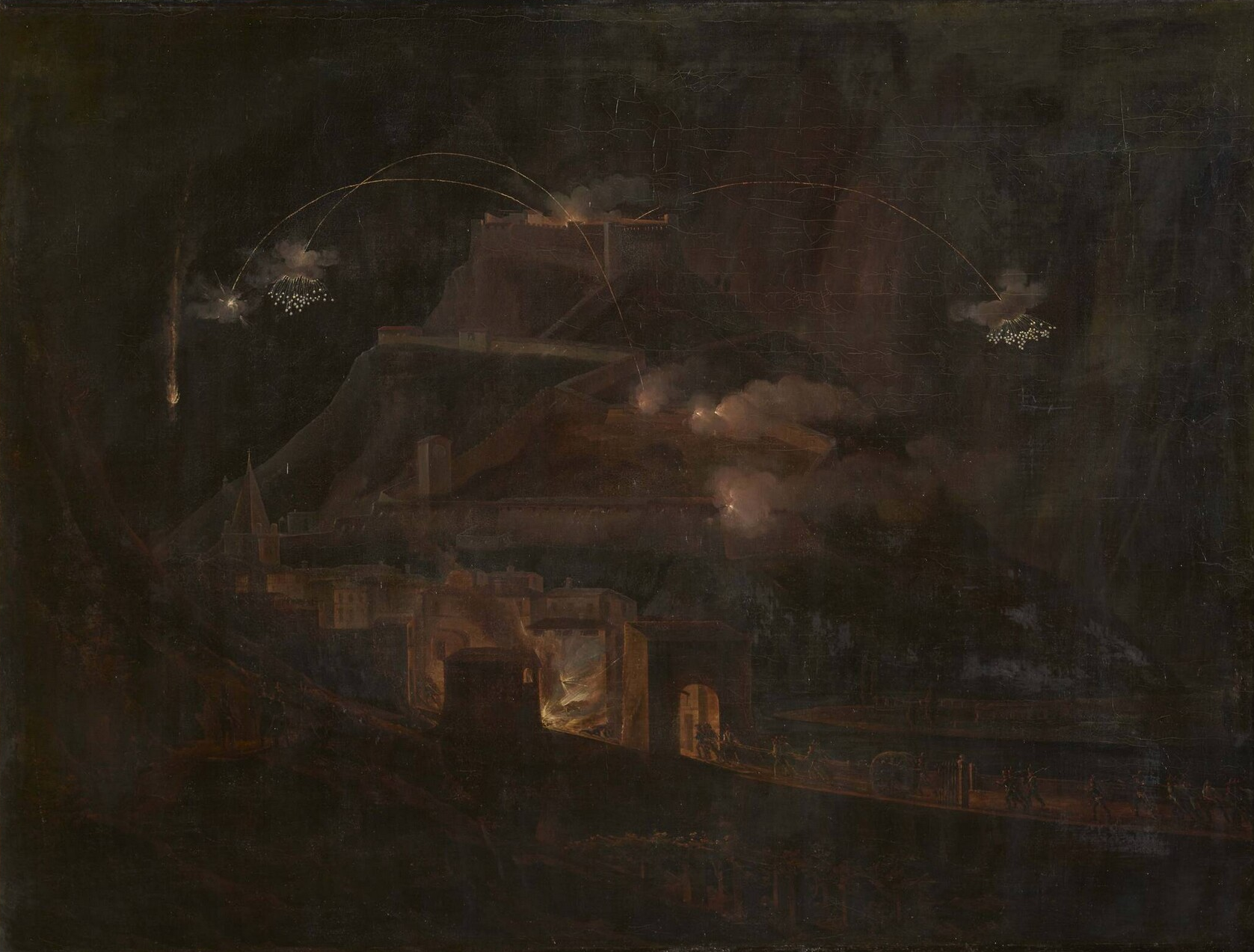
- French artillery bypassing Fort Bard on the night of 21 May 1800. Painting by Jean-Rodolphe Gautier, 1801.
Date	14 May – 1 June 1800
Location	Fort Bard, Aosta Valley 45°36′30″N 7°44′41″E
Result	French victory

Belligerents
(French First Republic) France	(Habsburg monarchy) Austria; Kingdom of Sardinia

Commanders and leaders
(French First Republic) Napoleon Bonaparte	(Habsburg monarchy) Josef von Bernkopf

Strength
At least 1,662 men	400 men

Casualties and losses
at least 200 killed or wounded	200 killed or wounded 200 captured
- Location within Europe

The siege of Fort Bard (also known as Bard Fort) was a military action that took place during May 1800 during the second Napoleonic Italian campaign and blocked the advance of Napoleon Bonaparte's Armée de Reserve for 12 days in the narrow passage. Fort Bard was commanded by Captain Josef Stockard von Bernkopf with approximately 300 Austrian troops and 100 Sardinian soldiers.

== Prelude ==
On 13 May, Napoleon entered the current Italian region of Aosta Valley from the little Swiss town of Bourg-Saint-Pierre. Until 16 May, the French had not engaged the Austro-Sardinian enemy but as they entered Aosta, there was light fighting against the Austrian army.

== Siege ==
Napoleon's advance began to slow when a force led by generals Dupont and Dufour reached the village of Bard, dominated by a small fort that covered the main routes with the exception of a mule path that was used by Napoleon's advance guard to continue on to Ivrea. On the evening of 20 May, Dupont demanded the surrender of Stockard Von Bernkopf, commander of the Austrian company in the fort, who refused. In the meantime, French engineers widened and filled in the holes in the mule path to allow the rest of the army to continue, with the exception of the artillery.

On the night of 21 May the village of Bard was conquered by the French army, which proceeded to surround the fort. On 22 May three Austrian cannons captured after the combat of Châtillon started to fire on the fort, dealing little to no damage. In the morning of 26 May, the fort was attacked by 300 grenadiers in order to distract the garrison from a smaller force that tried to cross the Dora Baltea river. The defenders killed or wounded more than 200 of the grenadiers. Napoleon himself was worried by the tenacious resistance of the defenders, and the advance of an enemy army coming from Piedmont. On 27 May, Napoleon ordered a division commanded by Joseph Chabran to besiege the fort, and continued on with the rest of the army, rejoining his advance guard. A regiment of 1,243 riflemen led by 119 officers started to attack the fort, but the hidden French support cannons were too small to do serious damage to the building. The stalemate continued until 29 May, when the French positioned a 12-inch cannon in the church behind the fort, where it could not be seen by the enemy. On 1 June, the cannon began to fire on the fort, destroying a part of its walls. At the end of the day, Bernkopf surrendered, having lost half of his forces. The Italians were allowed to leave the fort with the honours of war before being made prisoner, as was custom at the time after a besieged force had surrendered.

== Aftermath ==
The Fort, called by Napoleon vilain castel de Bard ("evil castle of Bard") was destroyed completely by Napoleon, only being rebuilt in 1830 by King Charles Albert of Sardinia. The surprise attack at the Austro-Piedmontese forces on the Po river in Lombardy planned by Napoleon was delayed. Napoleon later took over Piedmont and Lombardy by defeating the Austrians at the Battle of Marengo.

== See also ==
- War of the Second Coalition
- Napoleonic Italian Campaigns
