= Samuel Bard =

Samuel Bard may refer to:

- Samuel Bard (physician) (1742–1821), American physician
- Samuel Bard (politician) (1825–1878), United States politician, newspaper editor and Governor of Idaho Territory
