= Bård =

Bård is a Norwegian masculine given name. It is a Norwegian form of the Old Norse name Bárðr. Sometimes it also appears as a surname. It may refer to:

== Given name ==
- Bård Borgersen (born 1972), Norwegian football player
- Bård Breien (born 1971), Norwegian film director
- Bård Breivik (1948–2016), Norwegian sculptor
- Bård "Faust" Eithun (born 1974), Norwegian drummer
- Bård Eker (born 1961), Norwegian industrial designer and entrepreneur
- Bård Jørgen Elden (born 1968), Norwegian Nordic combined skier
- Bård Finne (born 1995), Norwegian football player
- Bård Hoksrud (born 1973), Norwegian politician
- Bård Tufte Johansen (born 1969), Norwegian comedian
- Bård Kvalheim (born 1973), Norwegian middle-distance runner
- Bård Lahn (born 1983), Norwegian environmentalist
- Bård Aasen Lødemel (born 1976), Norwegian DJ and music producer known professionally as Skatebård
- Bård Løken (born 1964), Norwegian photographer
- Bård Mikkelsen (born 1948), Norwegian businessperson
- Bård Nesteng (born 1979), Norwegian archer
- Bård Øistensen (born 1951), Norwegian civil servant
- Bård Vegar Solhjell (born 1971), Norwegian politician
- Bård Tønder (born 1948), Norwegian judge
- Bård Torstensen (born 1961), Norwegian guitarist and record producer
- Bård Vonen (born 1955), Norwegian fencer
- Bård Ylvisåker (born 1982), Norwegian comedian

== Surname ==
- Anna Bård (born 1980), Danish actress and model
