= Rachel Baard =

South African theologian

Rachel Sophia Baard
- Education: Stellenbosch University (degrees in law and theological ethics); Princeton Theological Seminary (PhD)
- Known for: Sexism and Sin-Talk: Feminist Conversations on the Human Condition (2019)
- Awards: Andrew Murray / Desmond Tutu Book Prize (2020)
- Scientific career
- Fields: Theology; Theological ethics Feminist theology Political theology
- Workplaces: Union Theological Seminary, Richmond (Assistant Professor since 2019); Villanova University (former)

Rachel Sophia Baard is a South African theologian. Since 2019, she is an assistant professor of Theology and Ethics at Union Theological Seminary in Richmond, Virginia, United States. Her first book, Sexism and Sin-Talk: Feminist Conversations on the Human Condition (2019) won the 2020 Andrew Murray / Desmond Tutu Book Prize. Her research areas include systematic and constructive theology, theological ethics, and feminist and political theologies.

She graduated from Stellenbosch University with degrees in law and theological ethics. She earned her Ph.D. of Systematic Theology from Princeton Theological Seminary. Before moving to Richmond, she previously taught at Villanova University.

== Bibliography ==
- Baard, R. S. (2014). "The Heidelberg Catechism on human sin and misery". Acta Theologica. 20: 86–98. doi:10.4314/actat.v20i1.6S. ISSN 2309-9089.
- Baard, Rachel (2022). Major Review: A Theology for the Twenty-First Century. Interpretation: A Journal of Bible and Theology. 76 (2):165-167.
- "Bloomsbury Collections - T&T Clark Handbook of Political Theology". www.bloomsburycollections.com: 285–300. doi:10.5040/9780567670427.ch-019.
- Sexism and Sin-Talk: Feminist Conversations on the Human Condition, Westminster John Knox Press, 2019.
