= Bard Kheymeh =

Bard Kheymeh بردخيمه
- Village
- Location within Iran
- Coordinates: 31°03′08″N 49°48′07″E
- Country: Iran
- Province: Khuzestan
- County: Ramhormoz
- Bakhsh: Central
- Rural District: Soltanabad

Population (2006)
  - Total: 168
- Time zone: UTC+3:30 (IRST)
  - Summer (DST): UTC+4:30 (IRDT)

Bard Kheymeh (Persian: بردخيمه, also Romanized as Bard Kheymeh) is a village in Soltanabad Rural District, in the Central District of Ramhormoz County, Khuzestan Province, Iran. At the 2006 census, its population was 168, in 29 families.
