= Shahrak-e Emam Hoseyn, Khuzestan =

Shahrak-e Emam Hoseyn شهرك امام حسين
- Village
- Location within Iran
- Coordinates: 32°02′30″N 49°36′03″E
- Country: Iran
- Province: Khuzestan
- County: Andika
- Bakhsh: Abezhdan
- Rural District: Abezhdan

Population (2006)
  - Total: 102
- Time zone: UTC+3:30 (IRST)
  - Summer (DST): UTC+4:30 (IRDT)

Shahrak-e Emam Hoseyn (Persian: شهرك امام حسين), also Romanized as Shahrak-e Emām Ḩoseyn; also known as Bard-e Ghamchī) is a village in Abezhdan Rural District, Abezhdan District, Andika County, Khuzestan Province, Iran. At the 2006 census, its population was 102, in 16 families.
