= Bard, Nevada =

- Ghost town
- Location within the state of Nevada Bard, Nevada (the United States)
- Coordinates: 35°59′16″N 115°14′15″W
- Country: United States
- State: Nevada
- County: Clark
- Elevation: 2,572 ft (784 m)
- Time zone: UTC-8 (Pacific (PST))
  - Summer (DST): UTC-7 (PDT)
- GNIS feature ID: 855964

Bard is an extinct town in Clark County, in the U.S. state of Nevada.

The community was named after D. C. Bard, a natural scientist; it was located on the Union Pacific Railroad line south of Las Vegas.
