= Fort Bard =

Fortified complex above Bard, Aosta Valley, Italy

- Part of Aosta Valley
- Bard
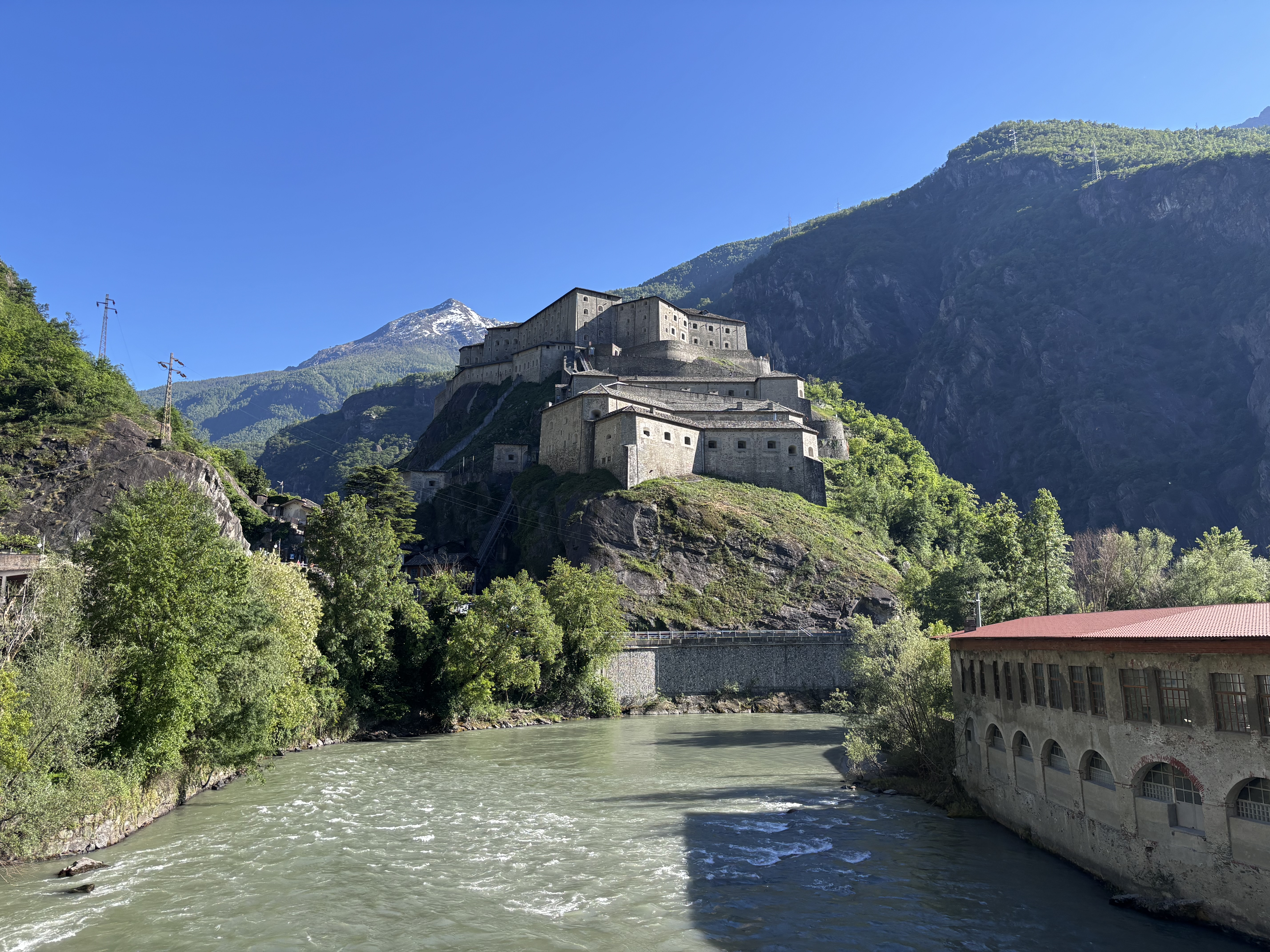
- The fort in 2026

Site information
- Type: 19th-century rectangular fortress with Casemates
- Owner: Autonomous region Aosta Valley
- Open to the public: Yes
- Condition: Restored

Location
- Coordinates: 45°36′30″N 7°44′41″E
- Height: Up to 60 metres (200 ft)

Site history
- Built: 1830–1838
- Built by: Francesco Antonio Olivero
- Materials: Stone; Concrete

Garrison information
- Occupants: Museum of the Alps

Fort Bard, also known as Bard Fort (Italian: Forte di Bard; French: Fort de Bard [fɔʁ də baʁ]), is a fortified complex built in the 19th century by the House of Savoy on a rocky prominence above Bard, a town and comune in the Aosta Valley region of northwestern Italy. Fort Bard has been completely restored after many years of neglect. In 2006 it reopened to tourists as the Museum of the Alps, it has additional art exhibitions and galleries. In the summer, the main courtyard is used to host musical and theatrical performances.

== History ==
The fort, which is at the entrance to the Aosta Valley, is located in a narrow gorge above the Dora Baltea river. It has been used for millennia to control the historic route between Italy and France. The current fortifications were built by Charles Albert of Savoy between 1830 and 1838. It replaced a 10th-century castle that had, itself, been built on an earlier structure founded by Theodoric I in the 5th century. The castle was under the control of the powerful local lords of Bard until the middle of the 13th century when ownership passed to the House of Savoy. Under their control, the defences were strengthened and improved.

On May 14, 1800, a 40,000-strong French army was stopped by 400 Austro-Piedmontese soldiers at Fort Bard. They held the pass for two weeks, completely ruining Napoleon Bonaparte's plan of making a surprise attack on the Po Valley and Turin. When he heard the news, he named the fort vilain castel de Bard. Bonaparte then ordered the fort to be razed to the ground. It was not until 1830 that Charles Albert of Savoy, fearing new attacks from the French, ordered that the fort be rebuilt. The task was entrusted to the famed Italian military engineer, Francesco Antonio Olivero.

The work, which took eight years to complete, created a fort with two distinct levels. The upper part had conventional battlements whereas the lower part had 50 gun ports in autonomous casemates that were designed to offer mutual protection if attacked. A total of 416 soldiers could now be billeted in the 283-room fort. The upper level had a courtyard which contained the arsenals and barracks. The fort had enough ammunition and food supplies for three months. By the end of the 19th century, the fort had lost its military value and fell into disuse. However, the Italian Army did continue to use the fort as a powder magazine. When it closed in 1975, ownership passed to the government of the Autonomous Region of Valle d'Aosta. In the 1980s the fort opened as a tourist attraction despite many buildings needing urgent repair.

== Present day ==
In the late 1990s the fort was closed. It then underwent major restoration work. In 2006 Fort Bard reopened as the Museum of the Alps. Fort Bard and its town were used as the fictional Eastern European country of Sokovia in the 2015 film Avengers: Age of Ultron directed by Joss Whedon.

== Gallery ==
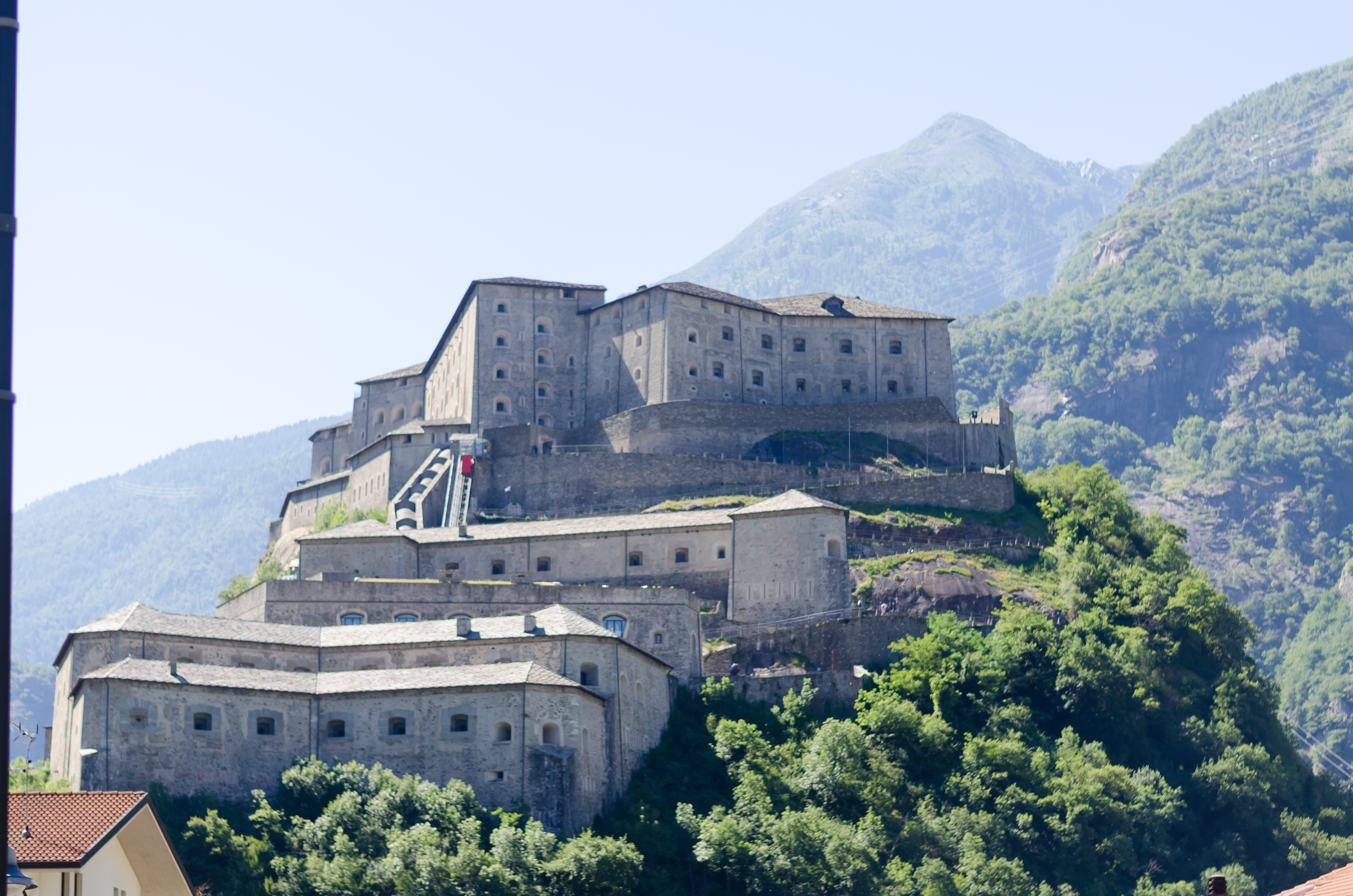
View of the lower Casemates.

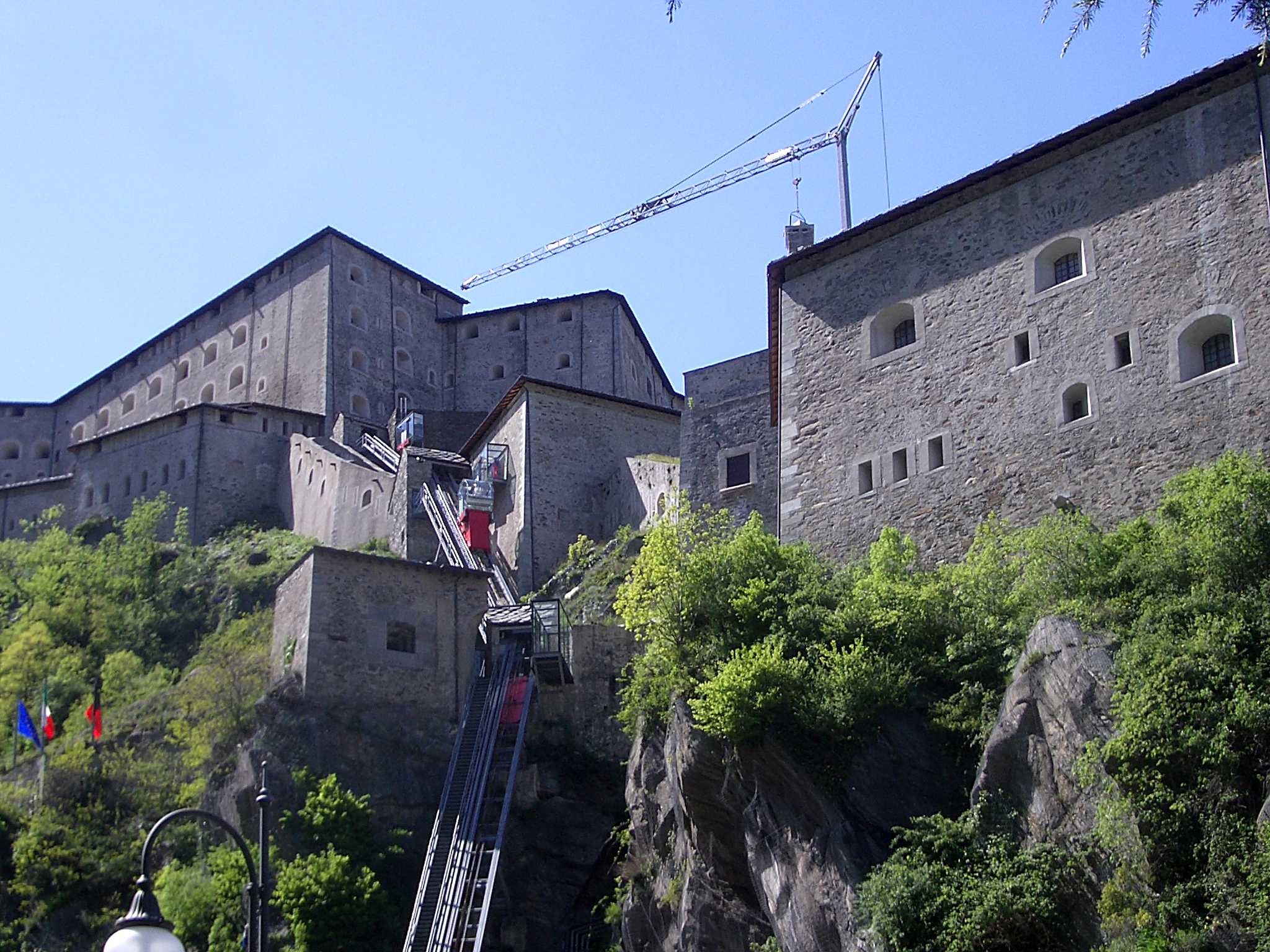
Funicular railway that takes visitors up to Fort Bard

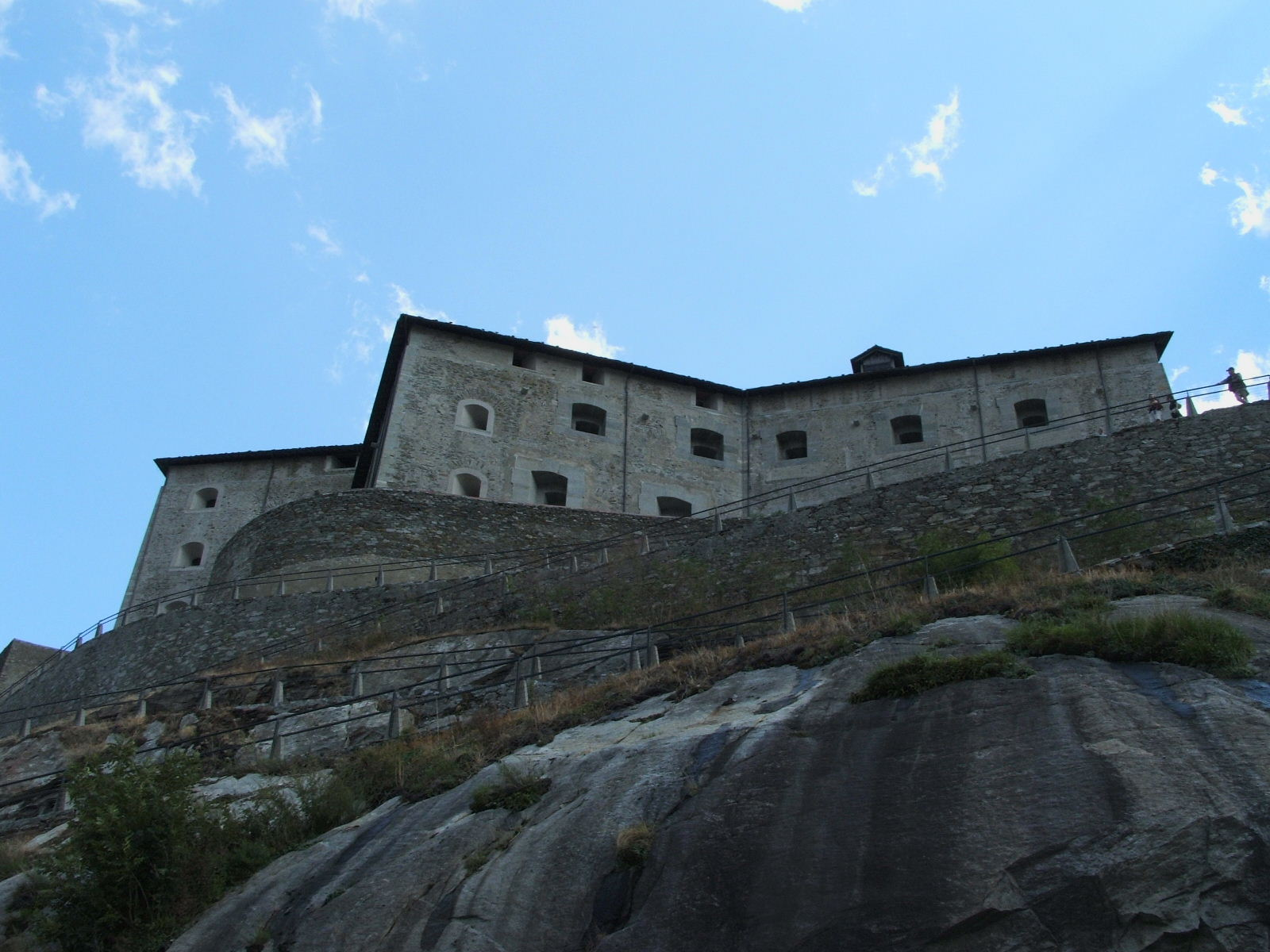
Fort Bard is 80m above the bottom of the gorge and the Dora Baltea river

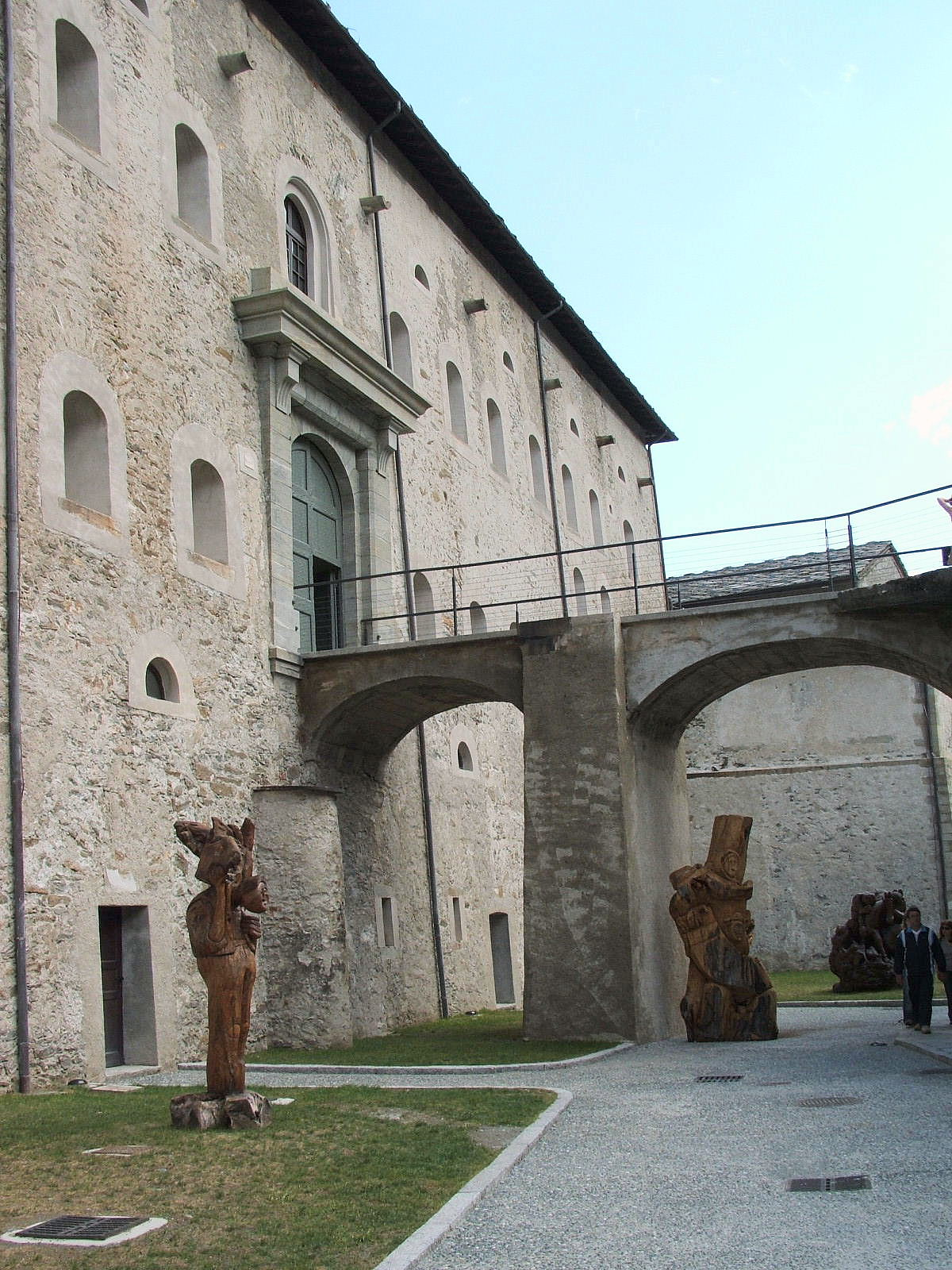
The main gateway was protected by a bridge. The rock-cut dry moat now has art installations.

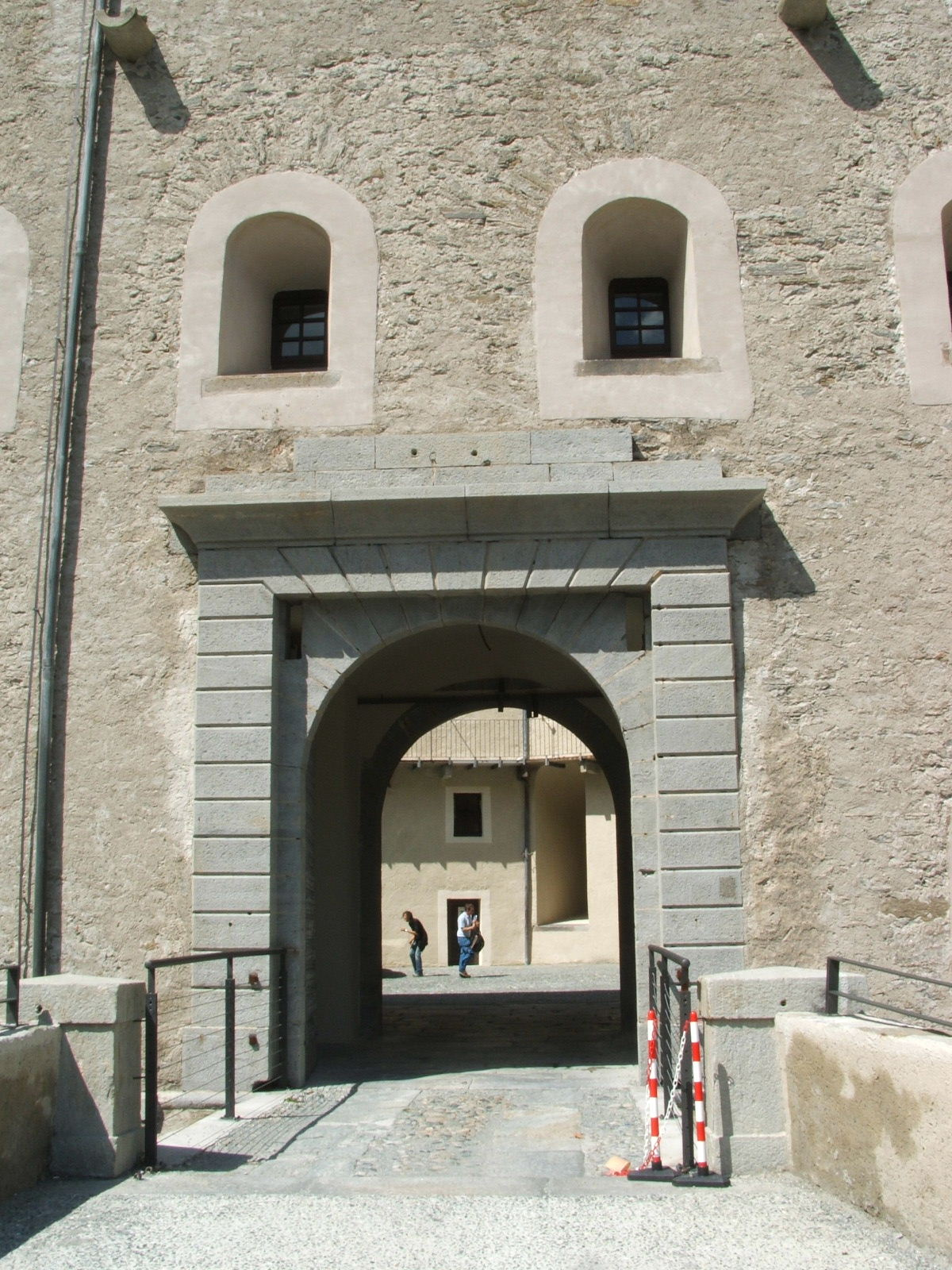
The gateway to the courtyard.

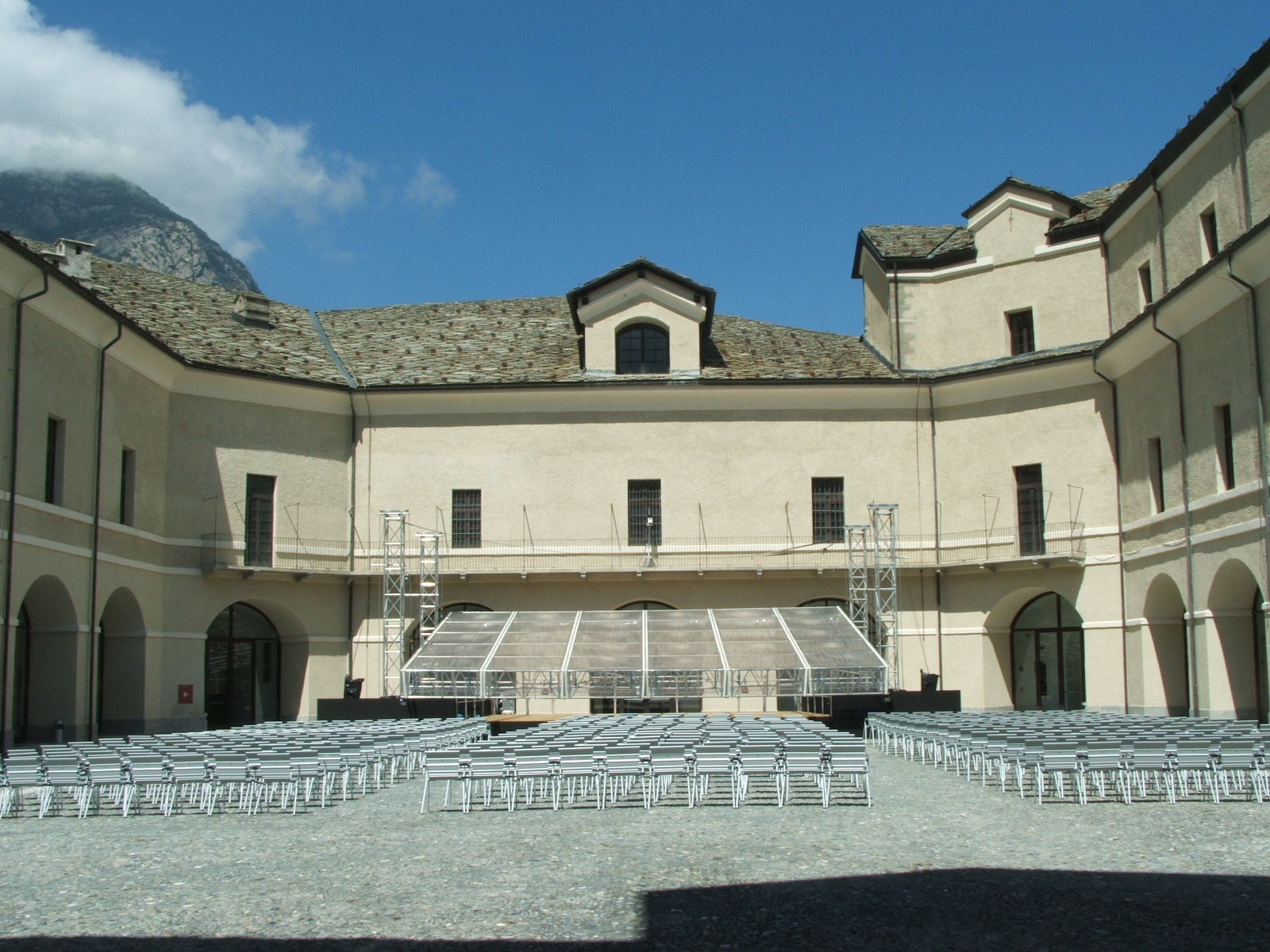
A summer festival performance in the renovated courtyard.

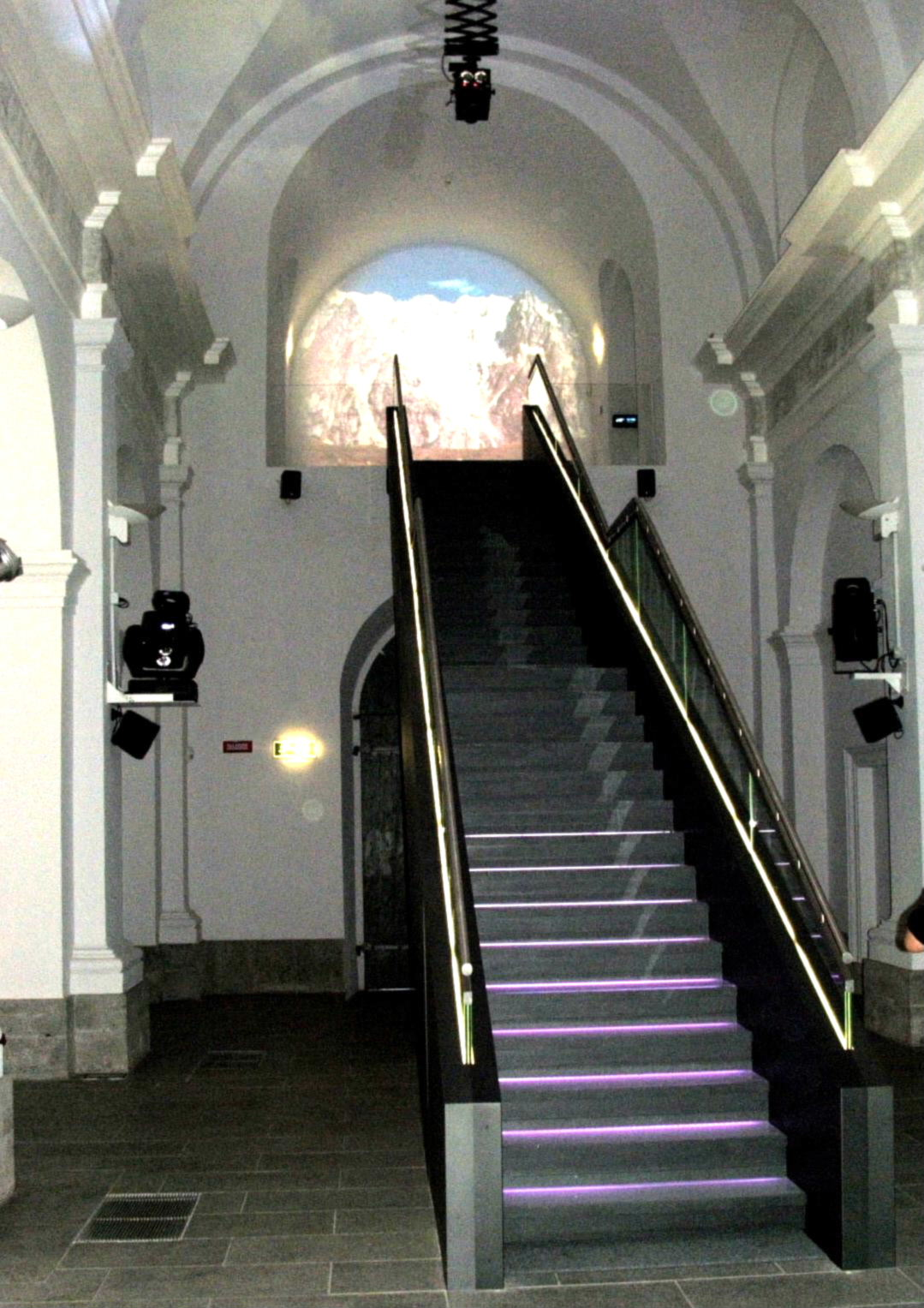
The restored interior of the fort.

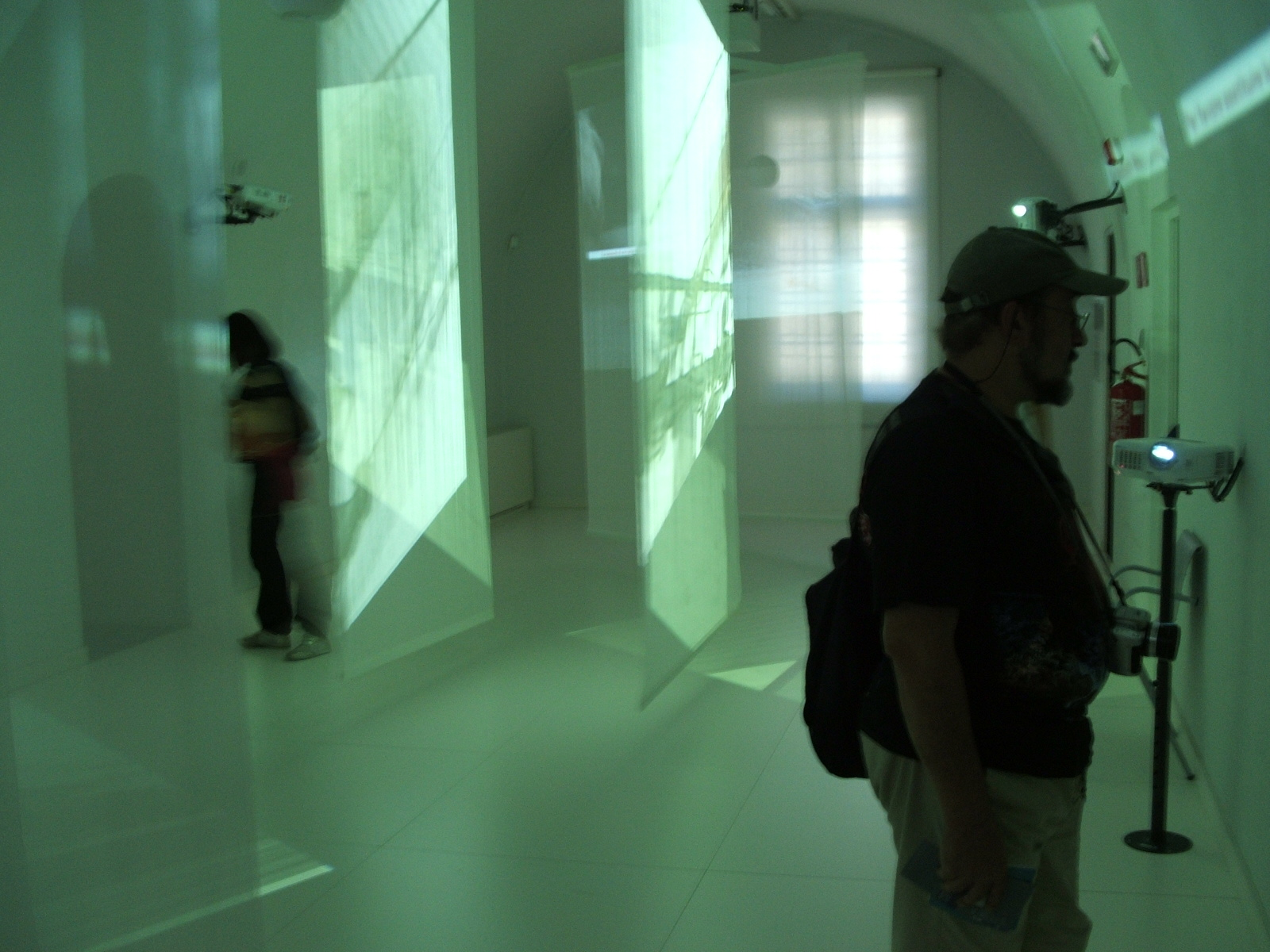
A Museum of the Alps gallery within the restored fort.

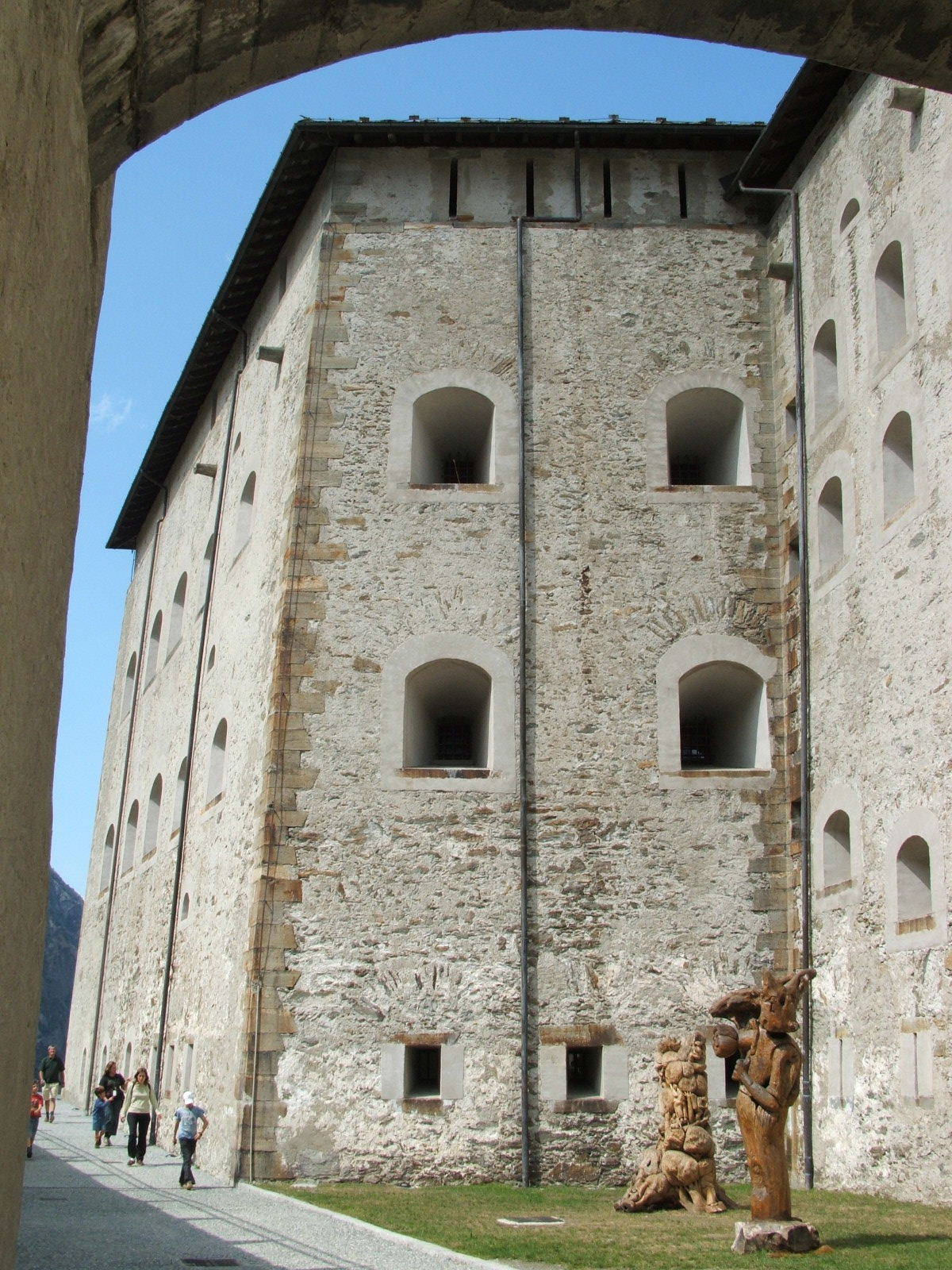
More of the main part of the fort.

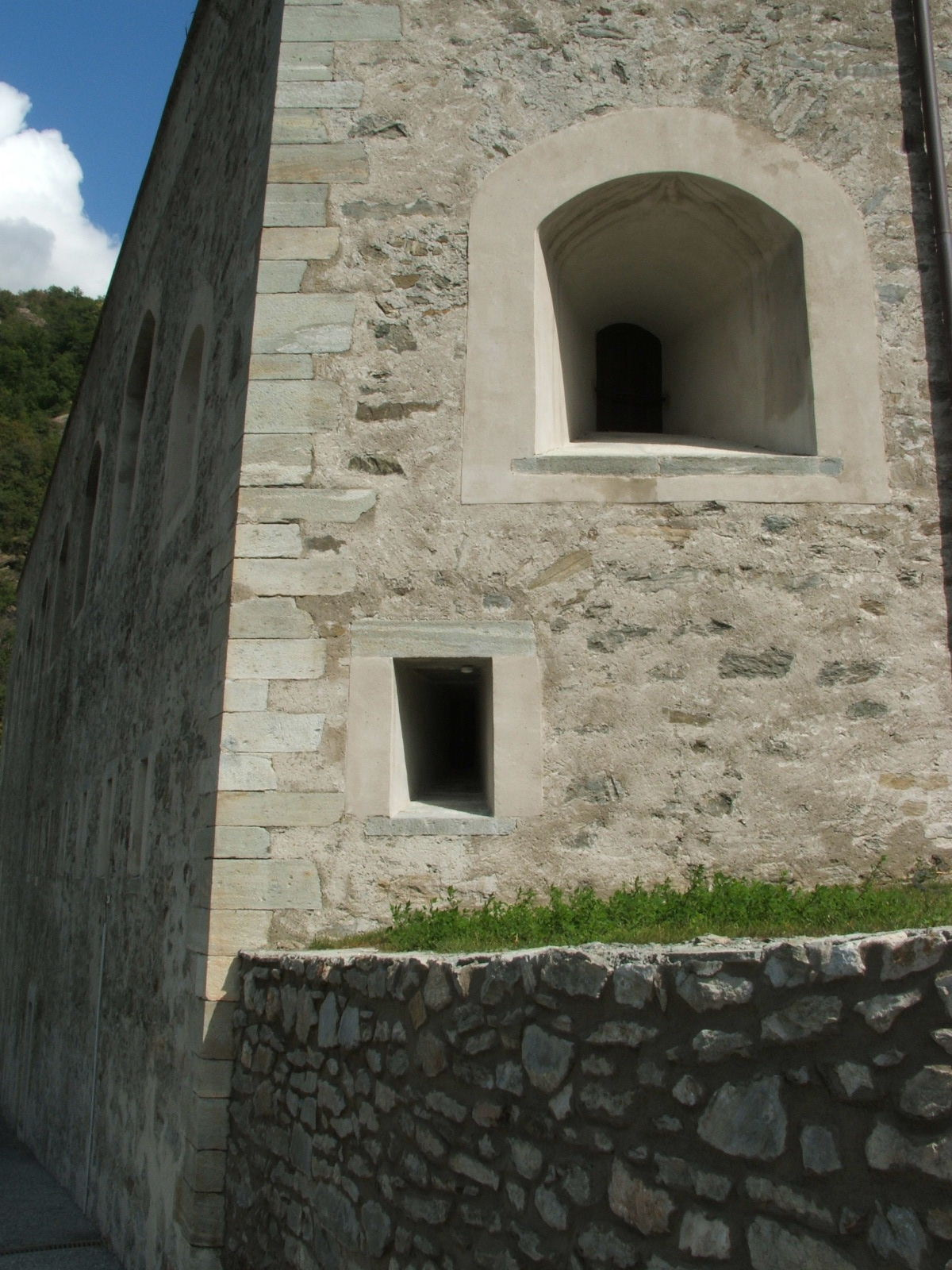
Gun ports were positioned to maximise enfilading fire.

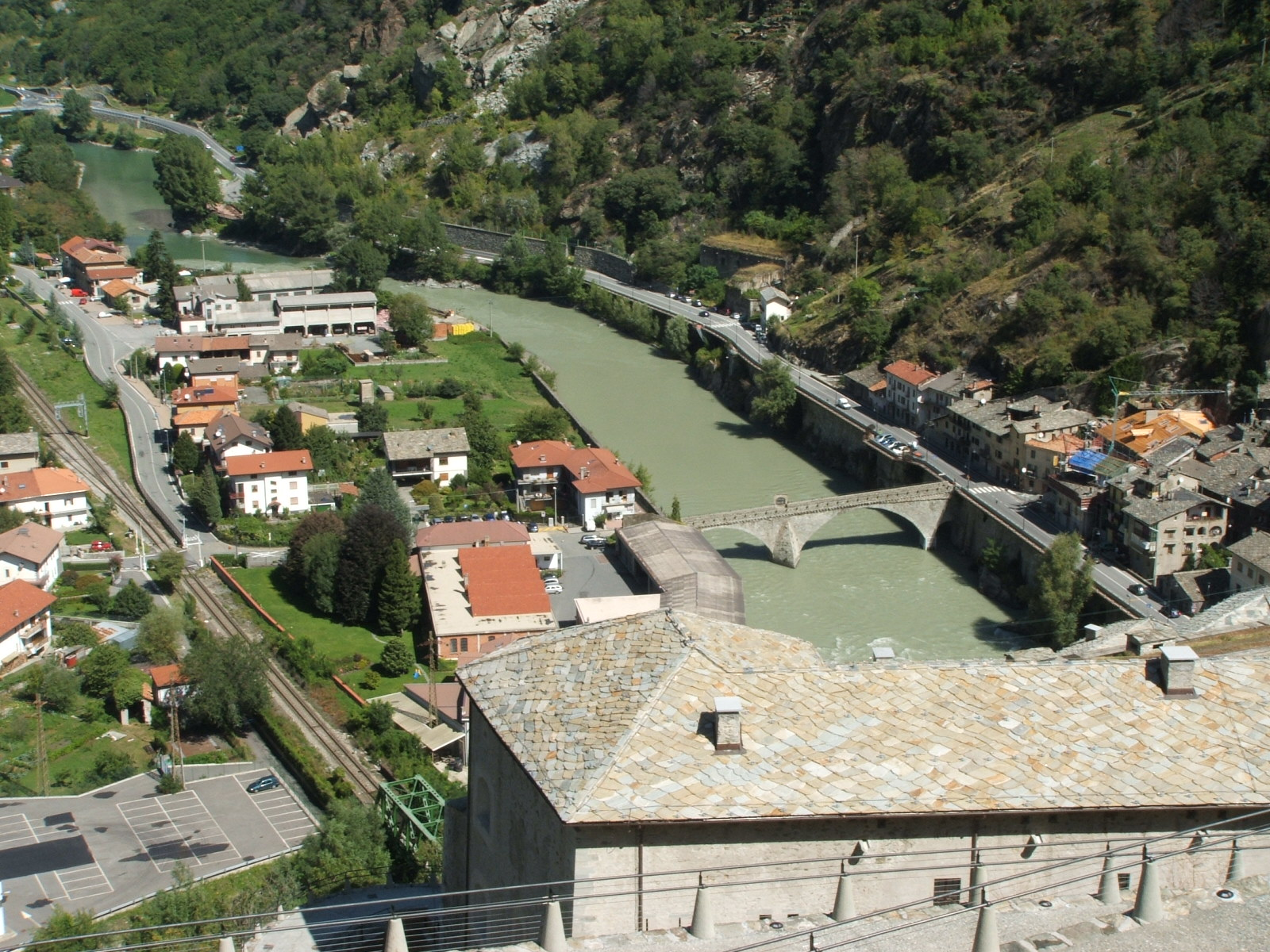
The fort's commanding position dominates this part of the Aosta Valley.

== Bibliography ==
- James R. Arnold, Marengo and Hohenlinden: Napoleon's Rise to Power (Pen and Sword, 1999)
- David G. Chandler, The Campaigns of Napoleon (London, 1966)
- International Napoleonic Congress, L'Europa scopre Napoleone, 1793-1804: Atti del Congresso internazionale napoleonico, Cittadella di Alessandria, 21-26 giugno (Edizioni dell'Orso, 1999)
