= Boston Alliance Against Registration and the Draft =

Massachusetts organization, 1979–1990

Boston Alliance Against Registration and the Draft (BAARD), was an anti-draft organization based in Cambridge, Massachusetts that operated between 1979 and 1990. BAARD was affiliated with the national Committee Against Registration and the Draft (CARD), which had been organized in response to President Jimmy Carter's 1979 call for draft registration.

BAARD organized movements to oppose draft registration. It similarly criticized what it described as militarization and foreign intervention. It organized actions at the Cambridge, Boston, Somerville and Watertown post offices, did media outreach, and created alliances with similar anti-draft groups, peace and legal groups. Anti-military counseling and CO counseling was also organized. BAARD opposed intervention in Central America. BAARD organized two draft registration counseling sessions with NISBCO and CCCO during the first Gulf War.
