= Samuel Bard (politician) =

American politician

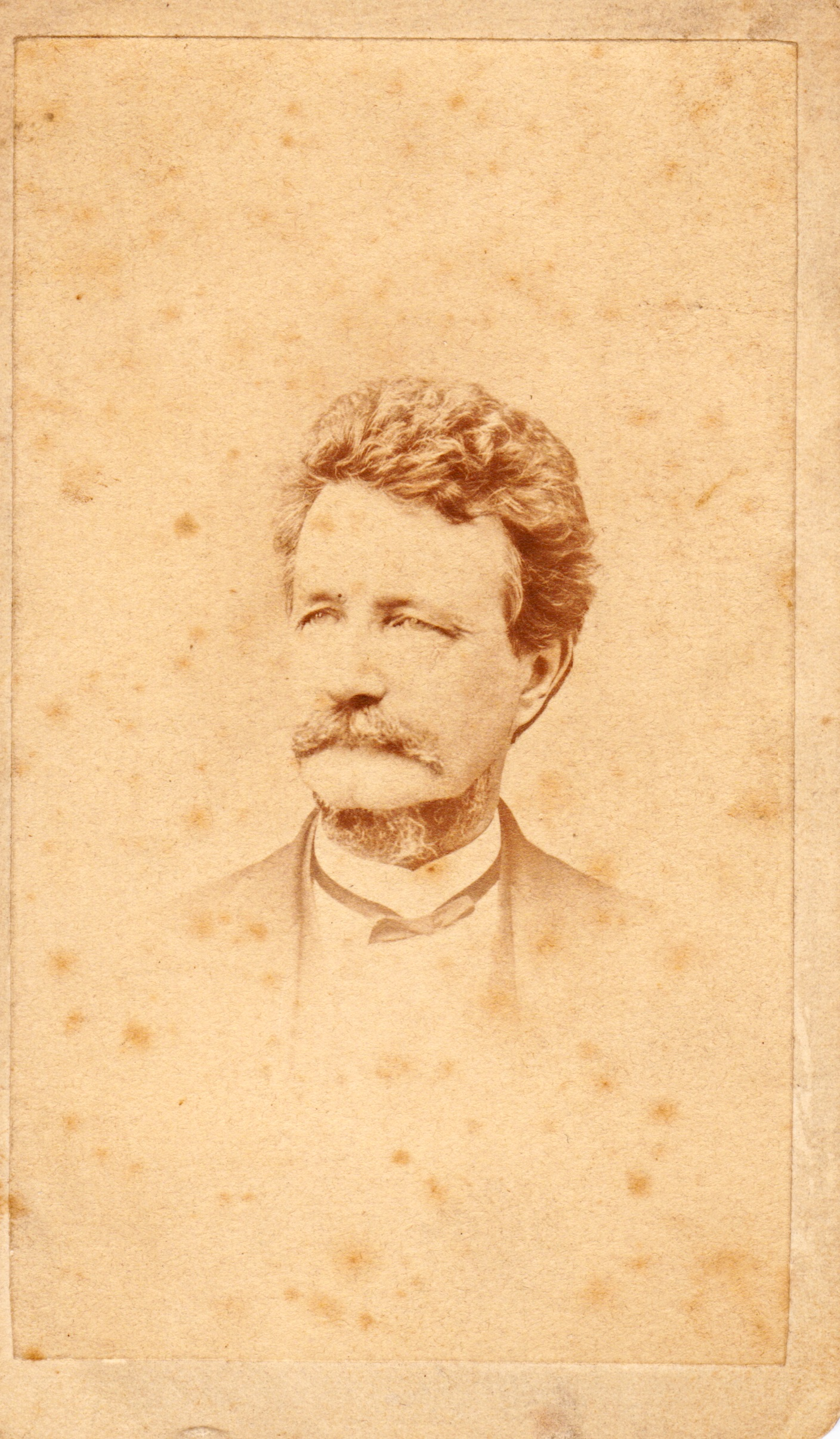
Photo by Mathew Brady's National Photographic Portrait Galleries. Circa 1865.

Samuel Bard (May 18, 1825 – September 18, 1878) was an American politician, newspaper editor and served briefly as Governor of Idaho Territory.

== Biography ==
Born in New York City, Bard moved to the South in 1845.

== Career ==
Bard served as the elected superintendent of public instruction in Louisiana 1855–1857 and was also a newspaper editor and part-owner of the Memphis Avalanche.

Bard served in the Confederate States Army during the American Civil War in the rank of captain.

In 1870, President Ulysses S. Grant appointed Bard Governor of Idaho Territory, and he signed the oath of office, secured a leave of absence to remain in Georgia, and then resigned the office in order to accept appointment as postmaster in Atlanta, Georgia. He later moved to Pensacola, Florida, and then Baton Rouge, Louisiana, where he published and edited newspapers.

== Death ==
Bard died in Baton Rouge, Louisiana as a result of yellow fever.
