= Bard, Aosta Valley =

Bard Bar (Valdôtain) Board (Walser)
- Comune
- Comune di Bard; Commune de Bard
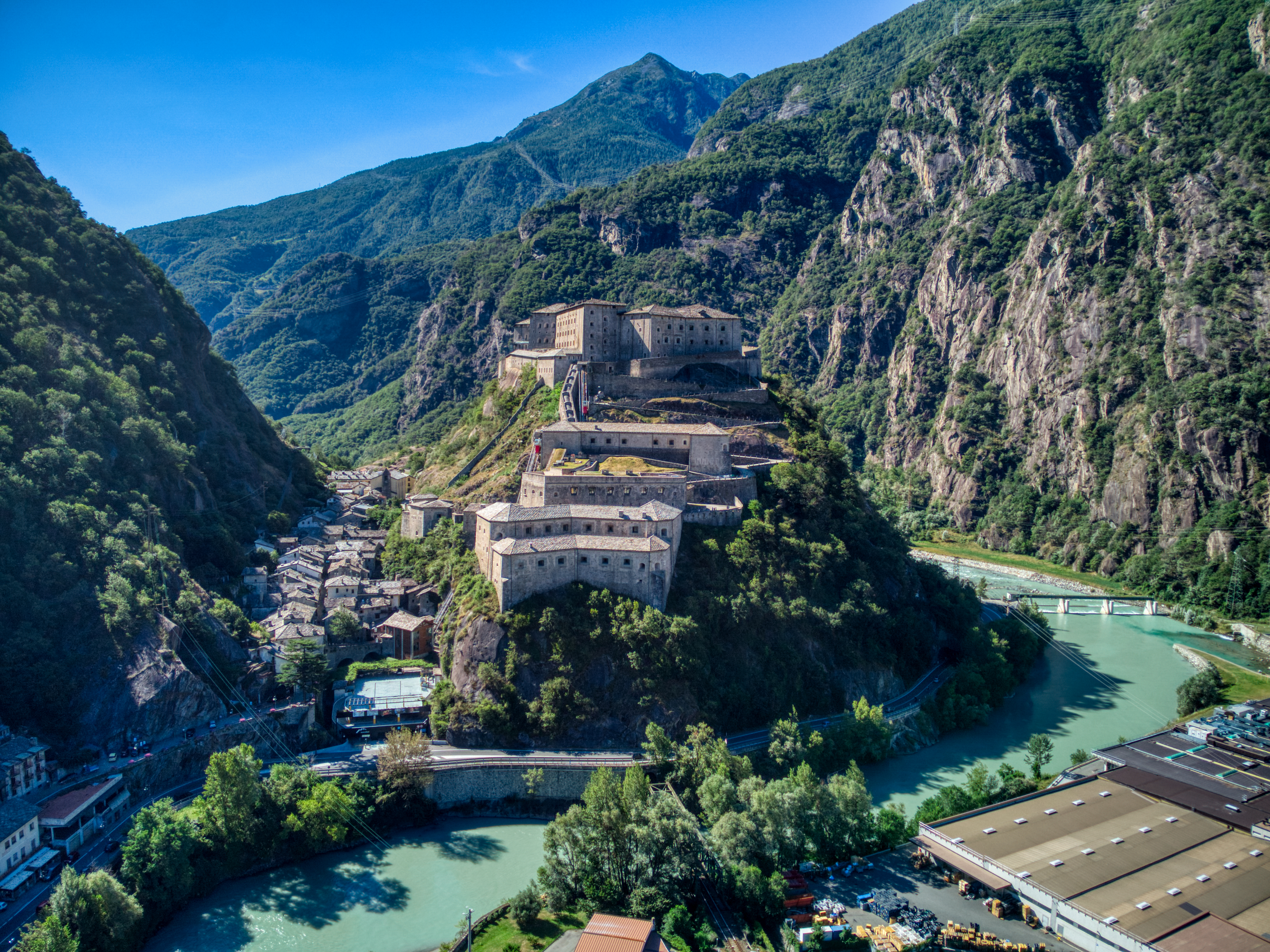
- Bard in the gorge near Bard Fort.

- Coat of arms

- Location within Italy Location within Aosta Valley
- Coordinates: 45°36′32.19″N 7°44′43.69″E
- Country: Italy
- Region: Aosta Valley
- Province: Aosta Valley
- Frazioni: Albard-de-Bard, La Barmaz, Le Bourg, Le Chemin-de-Saint-Jean, Le Chesal, Le Corlet, La Cou, Coudrey, Le Crous, Le Fort, La Fumas, Hors-des-Portes, Jacquemet, Liéron, Lillaz, Nissert, Le Petit-Fort, Sainte-Anne, Saint-Jean, Valsourdaz

Area
  - Total: 3.03 km^{2} (1.17 sq mi)
- Elevation: 400 m (1,300 ft)

Population (2026)
  - Total: 99
  - Density: 33/km^{2} (85/sq mi)
- Demonym: Bardois
- Time zone: UTC+1 (CET)
  - Summer (DST): UTC+2 (CEST)
- Postal code: 11020
- Dialing code: 0125
- Patron saint: Assumption of Mary
- Saint day: 15 August
- Website: Official website

Bard (French: [baʁ]; Valdôtain: Bar [bar]; Issime Walser: Board) is a village and comune (municipality) in the Aosta Valley region of northwestern Italy. It is part of the Unité des communes valdôtaines du Mont-Rose and has a population of 99. It is one of I Borghi più belli d'Italia ("The most beautiful villages of Italy").

Fort Bard (Italian: Forte di Bard; French: Fort de Bard) is a fortified complex built in the 19th century by the House of Savoy on a rocky prominence above the town. After many years of neglect, it has been completely restored. In 2006 it reopened to tourists as the home for the Museum of the Alps. The fort also has art exhibitions. In the summer, the main courtyard is used to host musical and theatrical performances.

== History ==
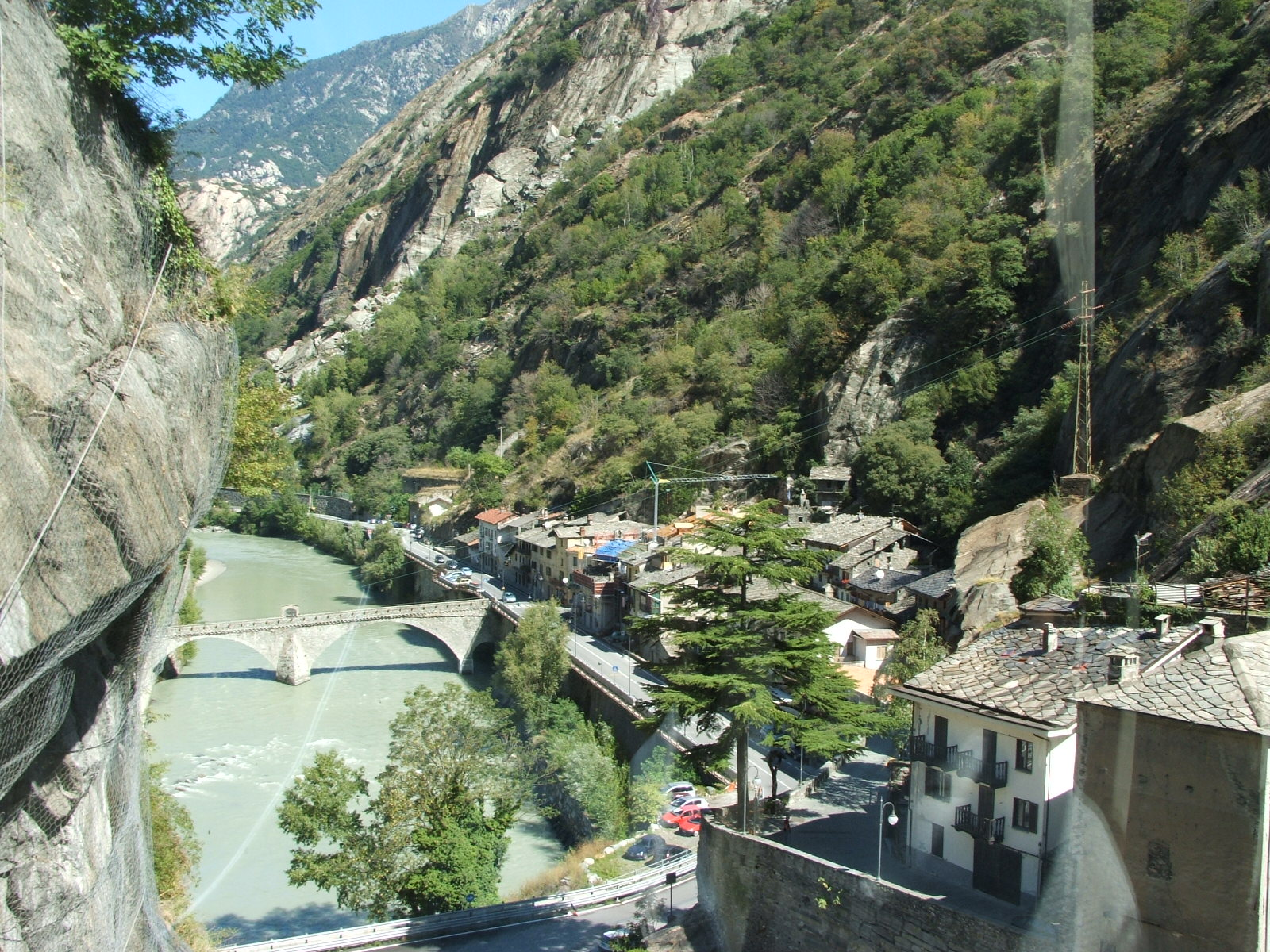
Bard lies within a steep-sided gorge within the Aosta Valley.

Bard lies at the centre of a deep, narrow gorge at the head of the Aosta Valley. This strategic point has been inhabited since the Neolithic period as archaeologists have found several large engraved stones around the area. It later became a major route between Celtic Gaul and the Roman world of the Italian peninsula.

Today the town has many buildings dating back to the 16th century. These include the Bishop's House and the House of the Sun Dial. The Dora Baltea is also crossed by a medieval stone bridge

Fort Bard, which protects the pass, is built on the site of many earlier fortifications. In May 1800, it halted an entire French army launching a surprise attack on Northern Italy. It eventually fell to the division of French general Joseph Chabran on 1 June 1800.

== Geography ==
Bard is located at the narrowest point of the Aosta Valley. At this point, the Dora Baltea makes a sharp turn around the large rock promontory on which Fort Bard is located. The steep valley sides mean the village is full of small streets that are bordered by historic stone buildings.

=== Climate ===
The climate is mild for most of the year. The winter is cold but generally dry.

== Demographics ==
As of 2026, the population is 99, of which 40.4% are male, and 59.6% are female, the highest females-to-males ratio of all Italian municipalities. Minors make up 14.1% of the population, and seniors make up 25.3%.

Historical population

| Year | Pop. | ±% |
|---|---|---|
| 1861 | 515 | — |
| 1871 | 382 | −25.8% |
| 1881 | 371 | −2.9% |
| 1901 | 334 | −10.0% |
| 1911 | 390 | +16.8% |
| 1921 | 282 | −27.7% |
| 1931 | 208 | −26.2% |
| 1936 | 182 | −12.5% |

| Year | Pop. | ±% |
|---|---|---|
| 1951 | 215 | +18.1% |
| 1961 | 186 | −13.5% |
| 1971 | 167 | −10.2% |
| 1981 | 142 | −15.0% |
| 1991 | 161 | +13.4% |
| 2001 | 139 | −13.7% |
| 2011 | 125 | −10.1% |
| 2021 | 108 | −13.6% |

Source: ISTAT

=== Immigration ===
As of 2025, immigrants make up 9.8% of the population. The 5 largest foreign countries of birth are Brazil, Romania, Albania, Argentina, and Cameroon.

== Economy ==
The economy is typical of the area, where agriculture, handicraft and tourism take the major roles.

== In popular culture ==
Bard has been a setting for numerous works of fiction and movies, including films, such as Avengers: Age of Ultron.

== Gallery ==
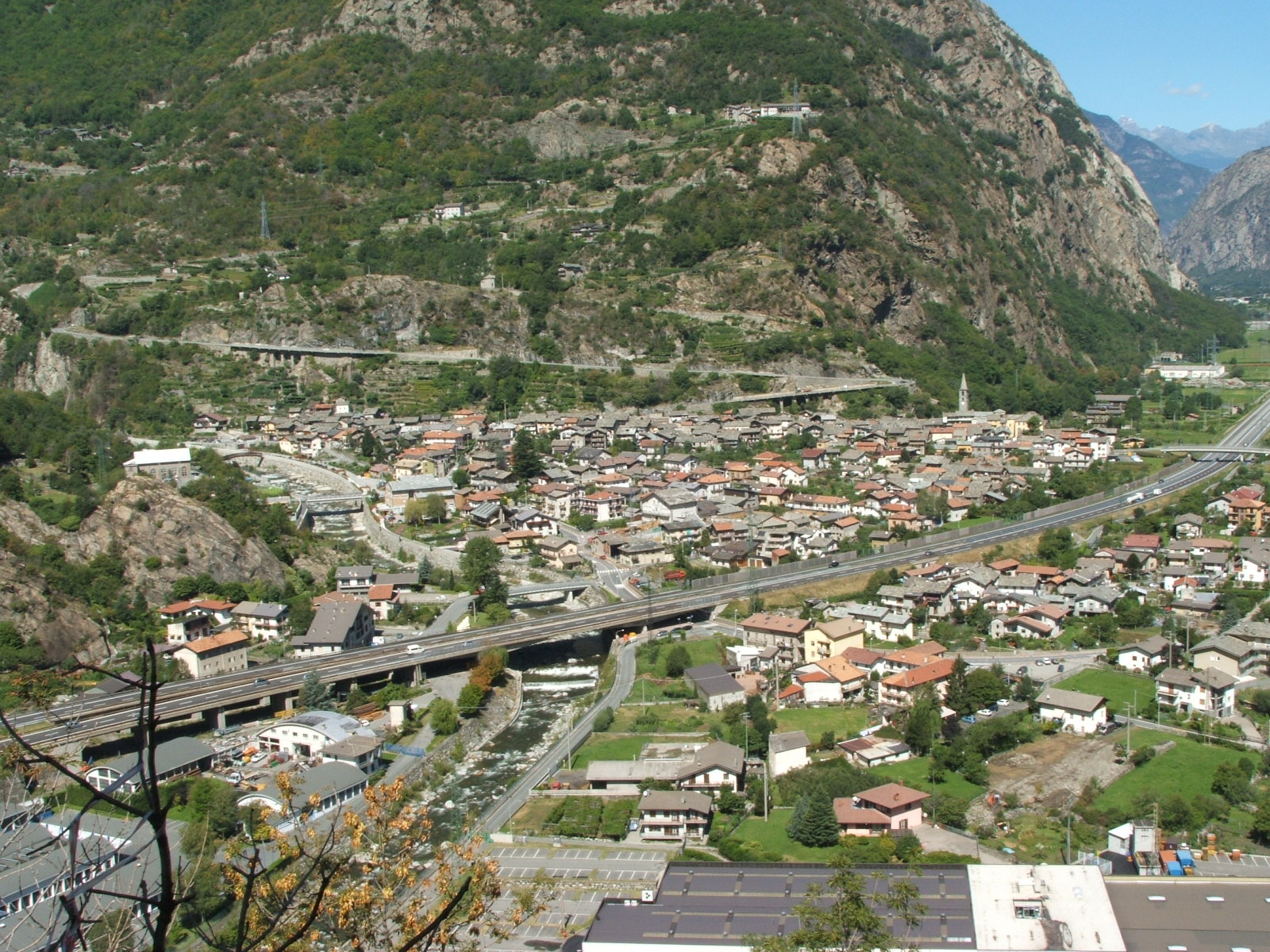
Bard and Hône (separated by the A5 motorway) seen from Bard Fort

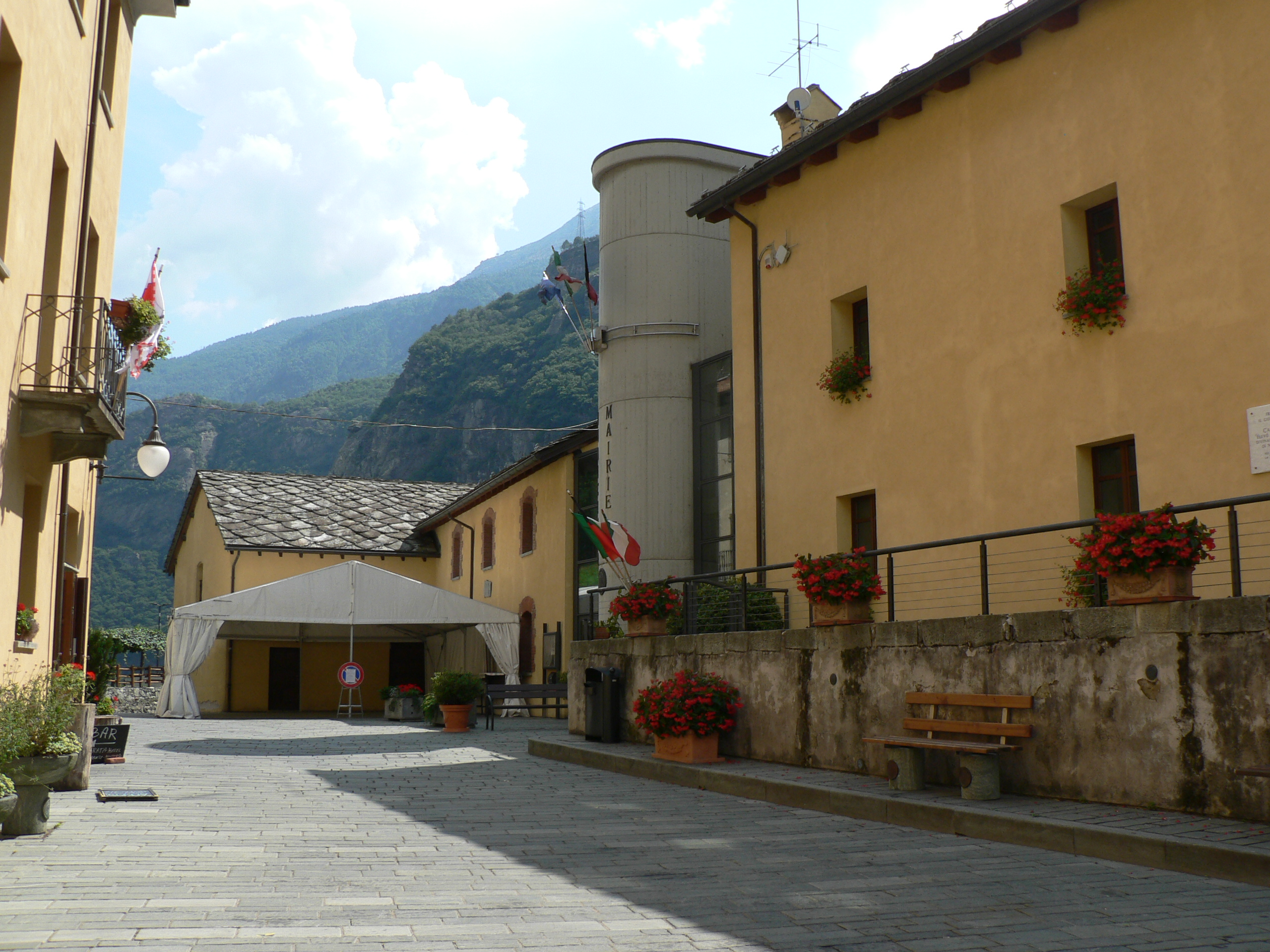
The town hall square

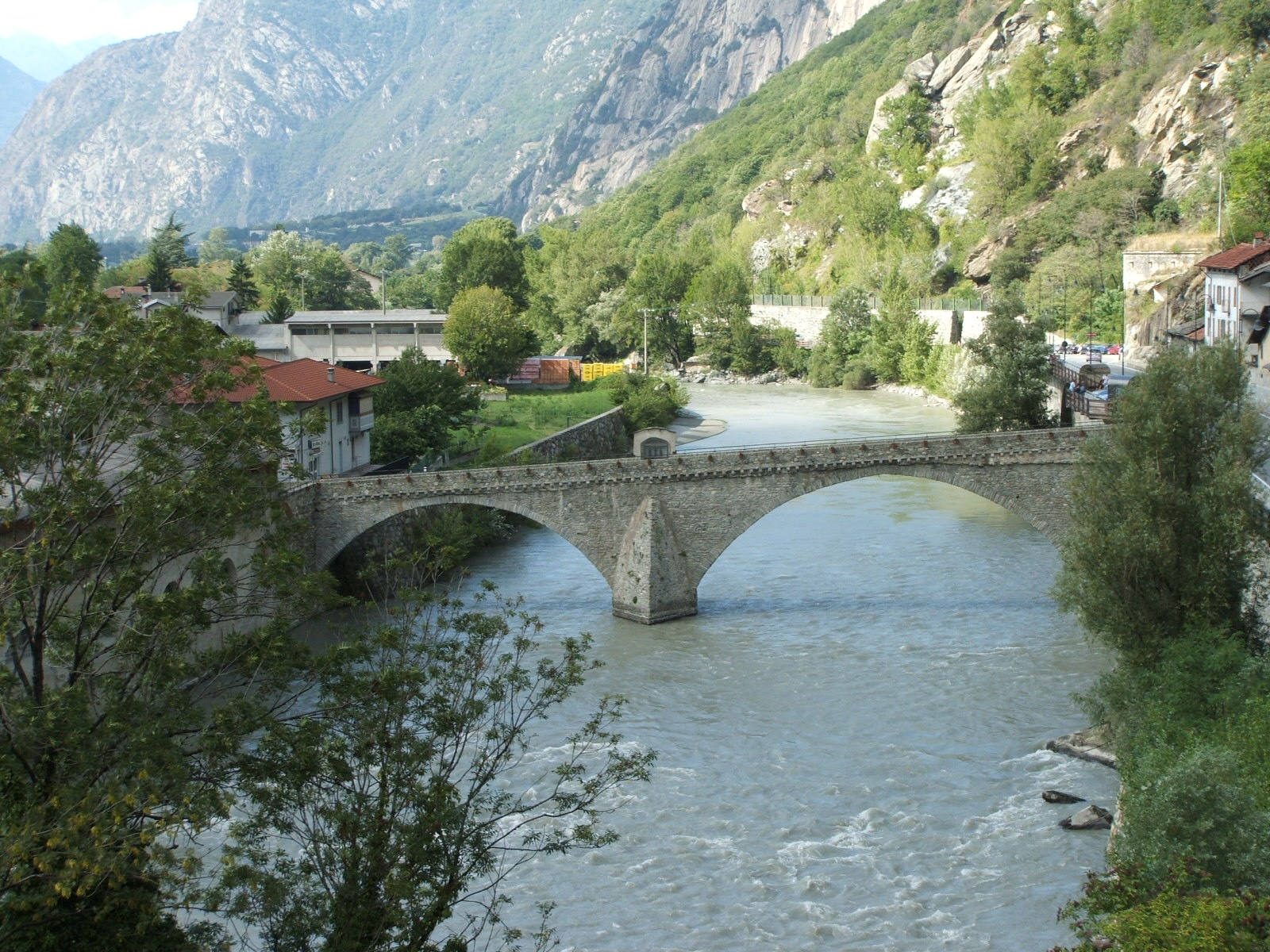
The medieval bridge across the Dora Baltea

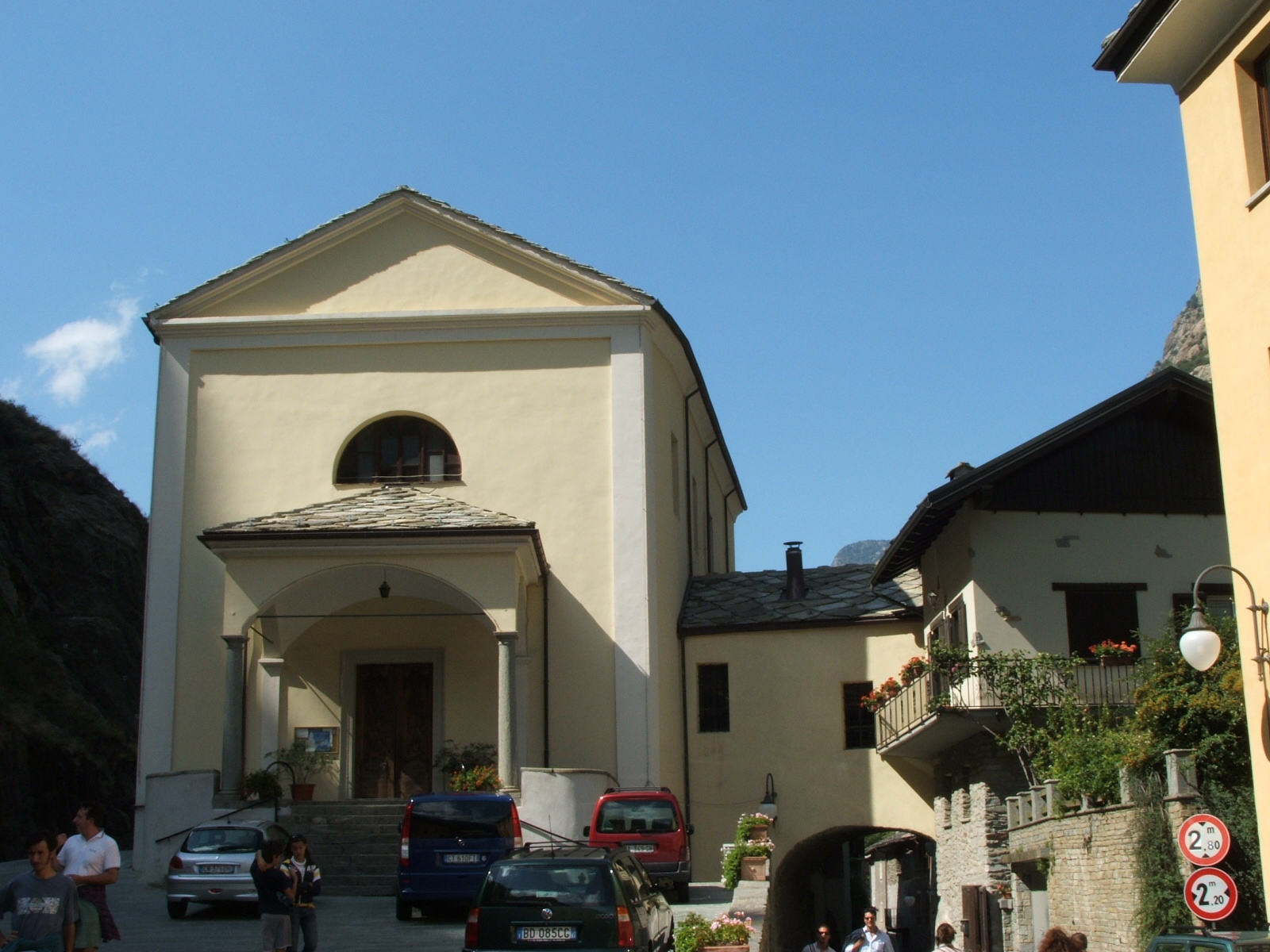
The parish church of the Assumption of Mary

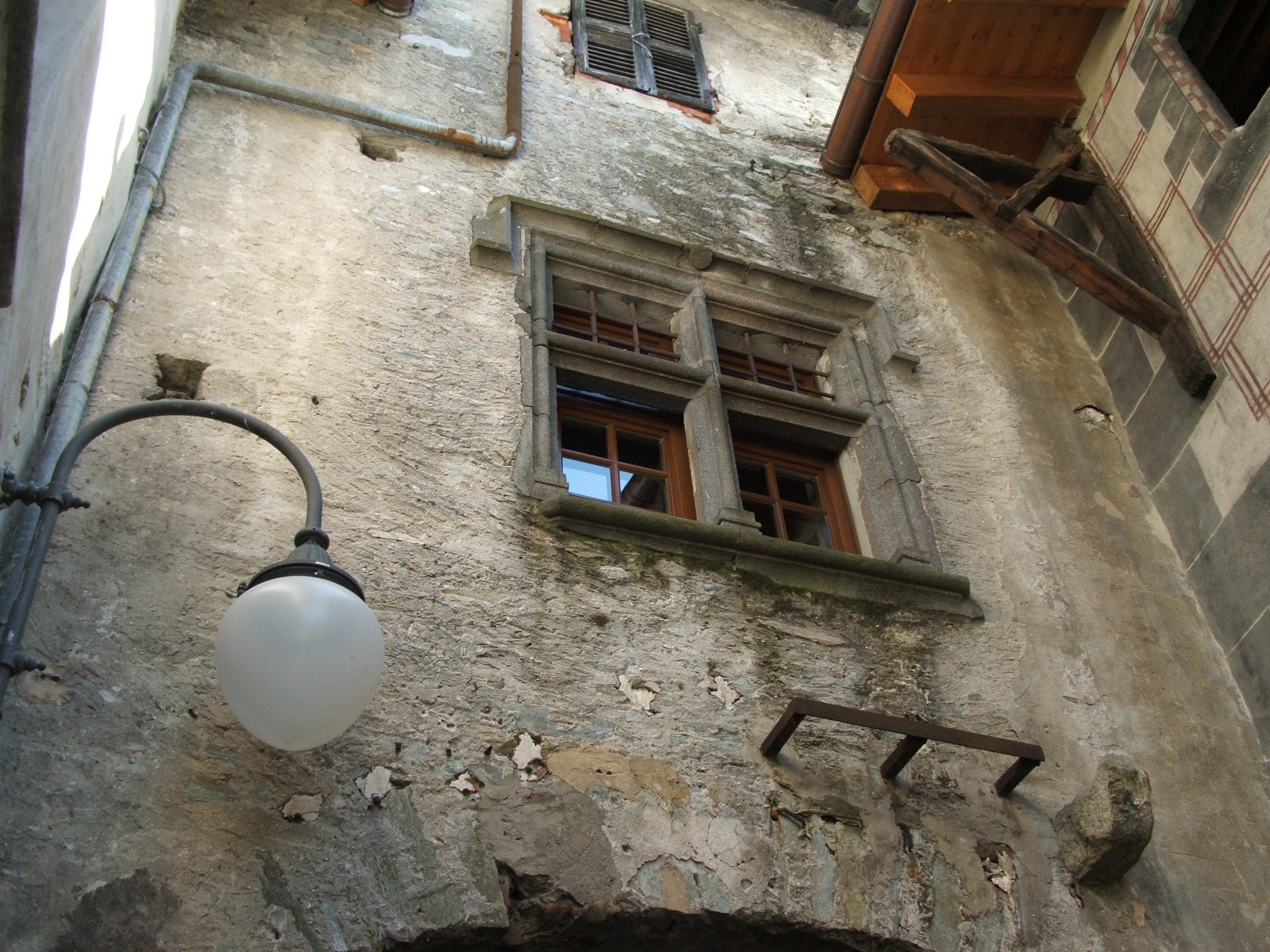
The distinctive stone-cross windows in the town

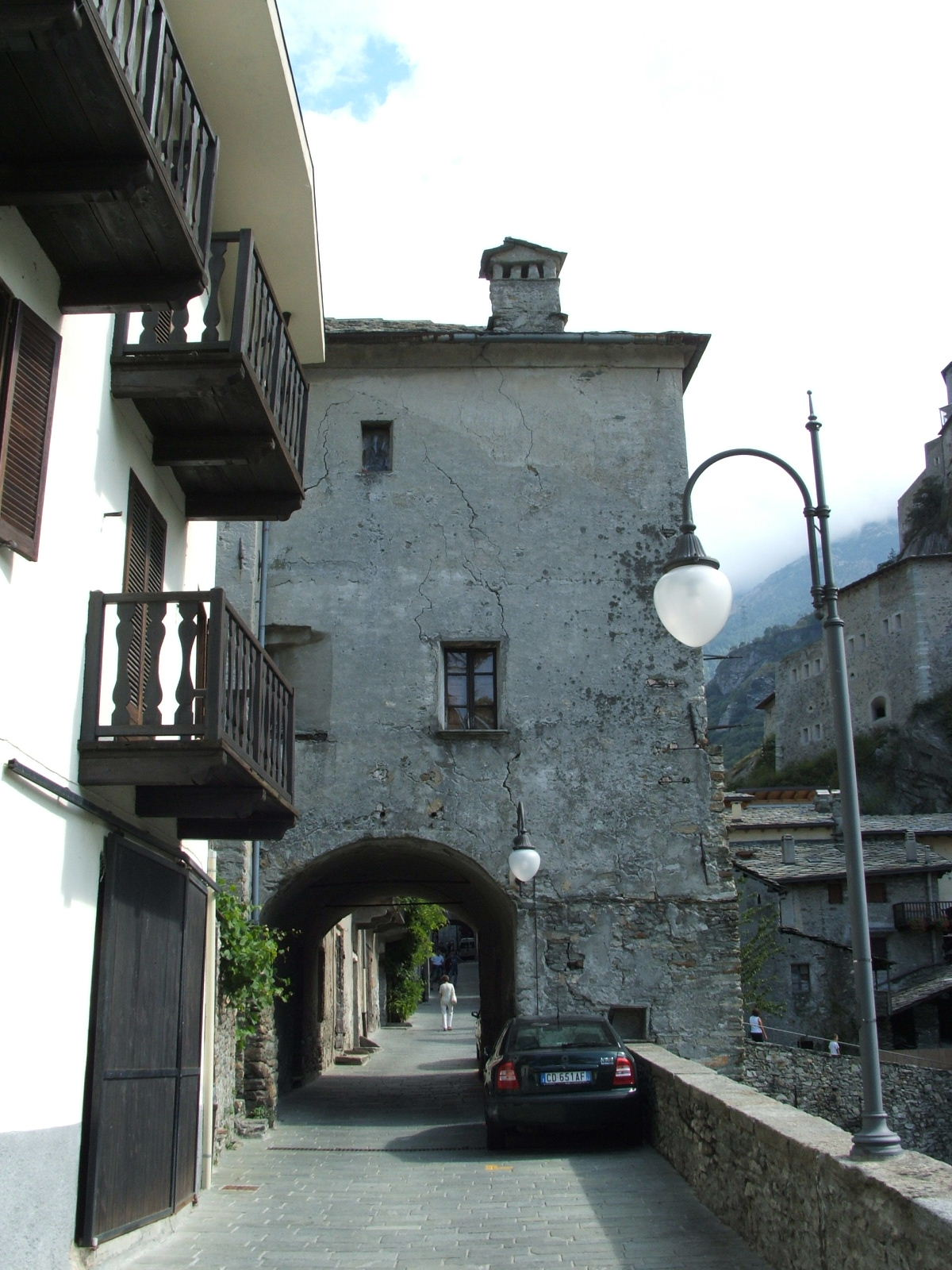
A tower house crosses a road
