= Anna Bård =

Danish actress and model

- Born: 2 April 1980 (age 45); Copenhagen, Denmark
- Occupation(s): Actress and model
- Years active: 2003 — present

Anna Bård is a Danish actress and model.

She has appeared in numerous commercials on Danish TV, but she has also starred in a couple of Danish films. She also guest appeared in an episode of the Danish sitcom Klovn, in episode 19: "Franks fede ferie".

In 2006, Anna Bård appeared on the Danish edition of Deal or no deal, as one of the suitcase girls.

== Filmography ==
- Regel nr. 1 (2003), BJ-girl
- Overlagt (2004), Louise
- Betonhjerter (2005), Sussie
- Brutal Incasso (2005), Louise
- Far til fire - i stor stil (2006), girl
- Westbrick Murders (2007), Barbara
- Pistoleros (2007), Stripper

== Television ==
- Klovn (2005), beach girl
- Deal or No Deal (Denmark) (2006), suitcase girl #11
- 2900 Happiness (2008), Lea
