= Richard =

Name list

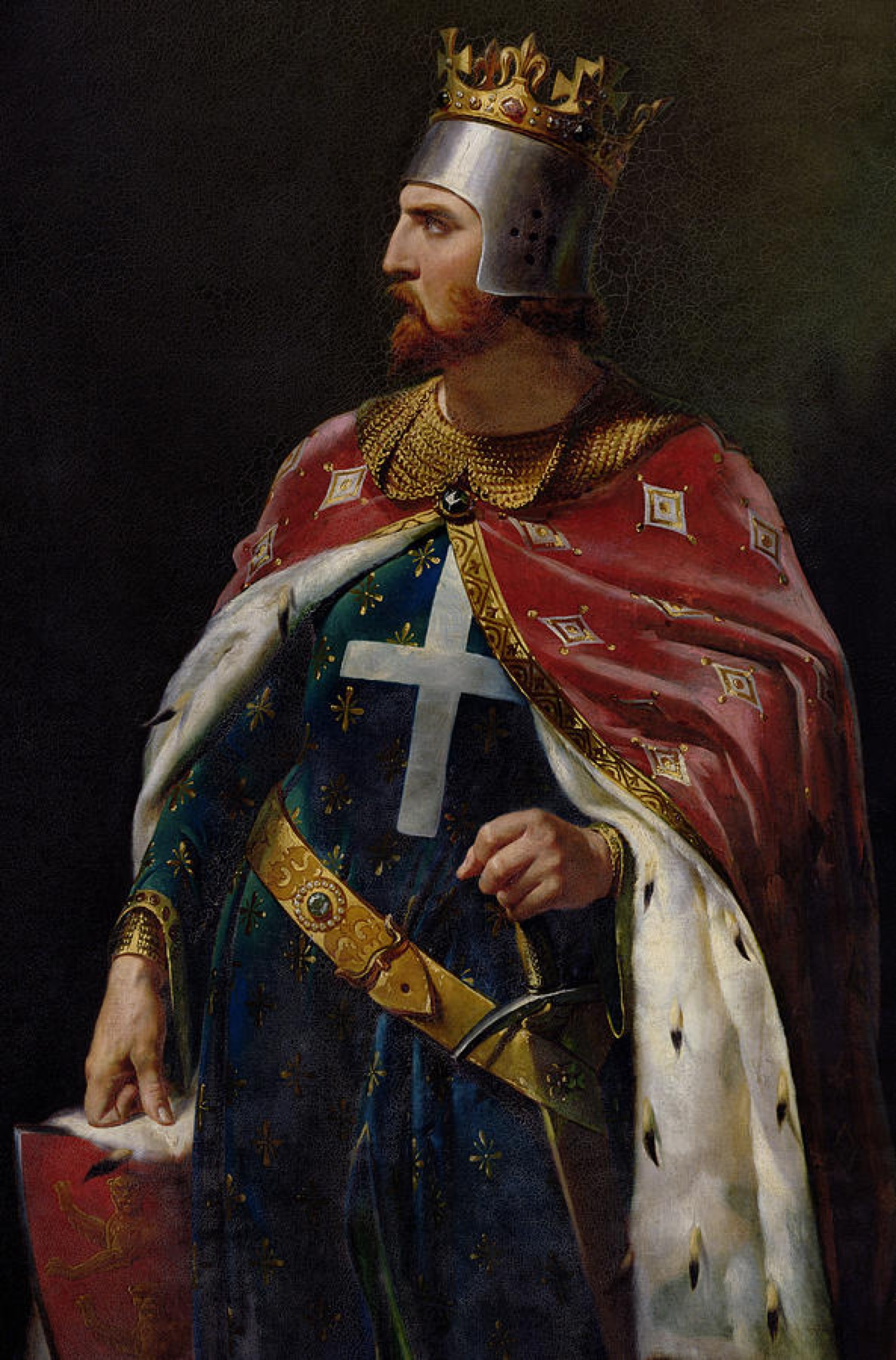
- 19th-century portrait of Richard I of England by Merry-Joseph Blondel
- Pronunciation: English: /ˈrɪtʃərd/ French: [ʁiʃaʁ] German: [ˈʁɪçaʁt] Czech: [ˈrɪxart]
- Gender: Male

Origin
- Origin: Frankish
- Meaning: 'strong in rule'

Other names
- Nicknames: Richy, Rich, Rick, Dick, Dicky, Dickie, Dicken, Reeks, Riccardo, Richie, Ritchie, Ricardo, Rico, Ricky, Rickie, Ritchy, Rickey, Rickard

Richard is a masculine given name. It originates, via Old French, from Old Frankish and is a compound of the words descending from Proto-Germanic *rīk- 'ruler, leader, king' and *hardu- 'strong, brave, hardy', and it therefore means 'strong in rule'. Nicknames include "Richie", "Dick", "Dickon", "Dickie", "Rich", "Rick", "Rico", "Ricky", and more.

Richard is a common English (the name was introduced into England by the Normans), German and French male name. It is also used in many more languages, particularly Germanic, such as Norwegian, Danish, Swedish, Icelandic, and Dutch, as well as other languages including Irish, Scottish, Welsh and Finnish. Richard is cognate with variants of the name in other European languages, such as the Swedish "Rickard", the Portuguese and Spanish "Ricardo" and the Italian "Riccardo".

== People named Richard ==
=== Multiple people with the same name ===
- Richard Andersen (disambiguation)
- Richard Anderson (disambiguation)
- Richard Black (disambiguation)
- Richard Burton (disambiguation)
- Richard Cartwright (disambiguation)
- Richard Chase (disambiguation)
- Richard Cole (disambiguation)
- Richard Connell (disambiguation)
- Richard Dale (disambiguation)
- Richard Gibson (disambiguation)
- Richard Gough (disambiguation)
- Richard Green (disambiguation)
- Richard Greene (disambiguation)
- Richard Griffith (disambiguation)
- Richard Griffiths (disambiguation)
- Richard Harris (disambiguation)
- Richard Leonard (disambiguation)
- Richard Marks (disambiguation)
- Richard Rodgers (disambiguation)
- Richard Rogers (disambiguation)
- Richard Seymour (disambiguation)
- Richard Walsh (disambiguation)
- Richard Welch (disambiguation)
- Richard Wilkins (disambiguation)
- Richard Wilson (disambiguation)
- Richard Worley (disambiguation)

=== Rulers and heads of state ===
- Richard, Duke of Burgundy (858–921)
- Richard I of Normandy (933–996), Duke of Normandy
- Richard II, Duke of Normandy (died 1026), son of Richard I of Normandy
- Richard I of Capua (died 1078), King of Capua and Count of Aversa
- Richard I of England or Richard the Lionheart (1157–1199)
- Richard of Cornwall (1209–1272), 1st Earl of Cornwall, elected King of Germany
- Richard II of England (1367–1400)
- Richard III of England (1452–1485)
- Richard Cromwell (1626–1712), son and successor of Oliver Cromwell, Protector of England

=== Aristocrats and non-ruling royals ===
- Richard, Count of Évreux (died 1067), a Norman aristocrat
- Richard, Count of Molise (died c. 1170), a Norman nobleman
- Richard, Count of Acerra (died 1196), an Italo-Norman nobleman
- Richard fitz Gilbert (before 1035 – c. 1090), Norman lord involved in the conquest of England
- Richard de Clare, 6th Earl of Gloucester (1222–1262)
- Richard of Conisburgh, 3rd Earl of Cambridge
- Richard Óg de Burgh, 2nd Earl of Ulster (1259–1326)
- Richard Orsini (died 1304), Count Palatine of Cephalonia and Zakynthos, Count of Gravina, Bailli of Achaea
- Richard Neville, 5th Earl of Salisbury (1400–1460), Yorkist leader in the Wars of the Roses
- Richard of York, 3rd Duke of York (1411–1460), a principal participant in the Wars of the Roses
- Richard Neville, 5th Earl of Salisbury
- Richard Neville, 16th Earl of Warwick (1428–1471), wealthy English magnate and major protagonist in the Wars of the Roses
- Richard of Shrewsbury, 1st Duke of York (1473 – c. 1483), who would have been King Richard IV of England if he had lived
- Richard Boyle, 3rd Earl of Burlington (1694–1753), instrumental in the revival of Palladian architecture
- Richard Temple-Nugent-Brydges-Chandos-Grenville, 1st Duke of Buckingham and Chandos
- Richard Temple-Nugent-Brydges-Chandos-Grenville, 2nd Duke of Buckingham and Chandos (1797–1861), noted for squandering his great wealth
- Richard Temple-Nugent-Brydges-Chandos-Grenville, 3rd Duke of Buckingham and Chandos (1823–1889), British soldier, politician and administrator
- Prince Richard von Metternich (1829–1895), Austrian diplomat
- Richard, 4th Prince of Sayn-Wittgenstein-Berleburg (1882–1925), in present-day Germany
- Richard, 6th Prince of Sayn-Wittgenstein-Berleburg (1934–2017), German-Swedish aristocrat and landowner, husband of Princess Benedikte of Denmark
- Prince Richard, Duke of Gloucester (born 1944), British royal

=== Religious figures ===
- Saint Richard (disambiguation), several saints
- Richard (Dean of Armagh), early 13th century Dean of Armagh, Ireland
- Richard (first abbot of Fountains) (died 1139), an English Benedictine and Cistercian
- Richard (II), bishop of Bayeux (early 12th century), France
- Richard (III), bishop of Bayeux (12th century), France
- Richard I (bishop of Dunkeld) (died 1178), Scotland
- Richard the Chaplain (died 1178), chaplain of Malcolm IV of Scotland
- Richard (bishop of the Isles), late 13th century Bishop of the Isles, Scotland
- Richard Abbey (1805–1891), American Methodist minister
- Richard Baxter (1615–1691), English Puritan church leader, poet and hymn-writer
- Richard Beeard (1552–1578)), Tudor clergyman, poet, and hymn writer
- Richard of Dover (died 1184), Benedictine monk and Archbishop of Canterbury
- Richard Foxe (c. 1448 – 1528), Bishop of Exeter, Bath and Wells, Durham, and Winchester, Lord Privy Seal, and founder of Corpus Christi College, Oxford
- Richard Furman (1755–1825), American Baptist leader, first president of the Triennial Convention, the first nationwide Baptist association
- Richard von Greiffenklau zu Vollrads (1467–1531), Archbishop-Elector of Trier from 1511 to 1531
- Richard of Poitiers (died c. 1174), French monk, author of historical works, treatises and poems
- Richard Poore (died 1237), Bishop of Salisbury and Durham, who helped found Salisbury Cathedral in its present location
- Richard Swinefield (died 1317), Bishop of Hereford

=== In politics and government ===
- Richard Acland (1906–1990), one of the founders of the British Common Wealth Party and the Campaign for Nuclear Disarmament
- Richard B. Adkisson (1932–2011), chief justice of the Arkansas Supreme Court
- Richard Ahiagbah, Ghanaian politician
- Richard Aluwihare (1895–1976), Sri Lankan diplomat
- Dick Armey (born 1940), American politician, member US House of Representatives from Texas (1985–2003)
- Richard Armitage (politician) (1945–2025), American government official, Deputy Secretary of State (2001–2005)
- Richard Arrington Jr. (born 1934), first African-American mayor of the city of Birmingham, Alabama
- R. B. Bennett (1870–1947), Canadian politician, Prime Minister of Canada (1930–1935)
- Richard Blumenthal (born 1946), American politician, US Senator from Connecticut (2010–present)
- Richard Boyle, 1st Earl of Burlington (1612–1698), Lord High Treasurer of Ireland and a cavalier
- Richard Leslie Brohier (1892–1980), Sri Lankan Burgher land surveyor and author
- Richard Burchell (1943–2020), American politician
- Richard Burr (born 1955), American politician, US Senator from North Carolina (2005–present)
- Dick Cheney (1941–2025), American politician, Congressman from Wyoming (1979–1989), Secretary of Defense (1989–1993) and Vice President (2001–2009)
- Dick Clark (senator) (1928–2023), American politician, US Senator from Iowa (1973–1979)
- Richard Cotton (1923–2010), Western Australian politician, mayor of Fremantle from (1976–1978)
- Richard Court (born 1947), Australian politician, Premier of Western Australia (1993–2001)
- Richard J. Daley (1902–1976), American politician, Mayor of Chicago (1955–1976)
- Richard M. Daley (born 1942), American politician, Illinois state senator (1972–1980) and Mayor of Chicago (1989–2011)
- Richard Dallam (1865–1939), American politician, Secretary State of Maryland (1896–1899)
- Richard Darman (1943–2008), American politician, White House Staff Secretary (1981–1985), Deputy Secretary of the Treasury (1985–1987) and OMB Director (1989–1993)
- Dick Durbin (born 1944), American politician, US senator from Illinois (1997–present), Democratic Senate Whip (2005–present)
- Richard Gamp (born 2003), German politician
- Richard Grenville-Temple, 2nd Earl Temple (1711–1779), British politician and associate and brother-in-law of William Pitt
- Richard J. Gordon (born 1945), Filipino politician and broadcaster
- Richard Glück (born 1992), Slovak politician
- Richard Haldane, 1st Viscount Haldane, British nobleman and politician
- Richard Hatfield (1931–1991), Canadian politician, Premier of New Brunswick (1970–1987)
- Richard Helms (1913–2002), American government official, Director of Central Intelligence (1966–1973), US Ambassador to Iran (1973–1977)
- Junius Richard Jayewardene (1906–1996), President of Sri Lanka from 1978 to 1989
- Richard Johnson (judge) (1937–2019), Irish jurist, President of the Irish High Court (2006–2009)
- Richard Jones, 1st Earl of Ranelagh (1641–1712), Irish peer, and politician both in the Parliaments of England and Ireland
- Richard Charles Kannangara (1920–1946), Sri Lankan Sinhala representative in the State Council of Ceylon for Morawaka
- Richard W. Kunkel (1934–2026), American politician, member of the North Dakota House of Representatives (1991–1998)
- Richard LeVasseur, American politician
- Richard Lovell Edgeworth (1744–1817), Anglo-Irish politician, writer and inventor
- Richard Lugar (1932–2019), American politician, US Senator from Indiana (1977–2011)
- Richard Albert McKinley (1886–1951), Director of the Indiana Department of Financial Institutions
- Richard Mentor Johnson (1780–1850), American politician, US Congressman from Kentucky (1807–19 and 1829–33), US Senator from Kentucky (1819–1829) and Vice President (1837–41)
- Richard Morefield (1929–2010), American diplomat
- Dick Murphy (born 1942), American politician who served as the 33rd mayor of San Diego, California
- Richard L. Murphy (1875–1936), Democratic US Senator from Iowa
- Richard W. Murphy (1929–2024), American diplomat and career member of the foreign service
- Richard Nixon (1913–1994), American politician, President of the United States (1969–1974) and Vice President (1953–1961)
- Richard Pathirana (1938–2008), Sri Lankan Sinhala politician and educationist
- Richard Pelpola (1898–1971), Sri Lankan Sinhala politician, Speaker of the Parliament of Sri Lanka
- Richard Perle (born 1941), American government official and foreign policy specialist, Assistant Secretary of Defense for Global Strategic Affairs 1981–1987
- Richard F. Pettigrew (1848–1926), American lawyer, surveyor, and land developer
- Richard Abusua-Yedom Quarshie, Ghanaian businessman and diplomat
- Richard Radl (1911-1977), American politician, member of the Iowa House of Representatives (1965-197)
- Richard Raši (born 1971), Slovak politician
- Richard Rush (1780–1859), American politician, US Attorney General (1814–1817) and Secretary of the Treasury (1825–1829)
- Richard "Rick" Santorum, American politician, attorney and political commentator
- Rick Scott (born 1952), American politician, US Senator from Florida (2019–present), Governor of Florida (2011–2019)
- Richard Seddon (1845–1906), New Zealand politician, Prime Minister of New Zealand (1893–1906)
- Richard Gotabhaya Senanayake (1911–1970), Sri Lankan Sinhala Cabinet Minister
- Richard Shelby (born 1934), American politician, US Senator from Alabama (1987–present)
- Richard Stockton (U.S. senator) (1764–1828), American politician, US Senator from New Jersey (1796–1799), Member of the US House of Representatives (1813–1815)
- Richard Henry Marthen Sualang (born 1973), Indonesian politician who has served as Deputy Mayor of Manado
- Richard Sulík (born 1968), Slovak politician
- Richard Takáč (born 1982), Slovak politician
- Dick Thornburgh (1932–2020), American politician, Governor of Pennsylvania (1979–1987) and US Attorney General (1988–1991)
- Richard Tötterman (1926–2020), Finnish diplomat
- Richard Udugama (1911–1995), major general, Commander of the Sri Lanka Army from 1964 to 1966, politician
- Richard von Weizsäcker (1920–2015), German politician, Governing Mayor of West Berlin (1981–1984) and President of the Federal Republic of Germany (1984–1994)
- Richard Wellesley, 1st Marquess Wellesley (1760–1842), Anglo-Irish Governor-General of India, Foreign Secretary in the British Cabinet and Lord Lieutenant of Ireland
- Richard Wells (politician), American politician
- Richard C. Wilbur (1936–2020), judge of the United States Tax Court
- Richard Wild (judge) (1912–1978), New Zealand jurist, Chief Justice of New Zealand (1966–1978)

=== In business ===
- Richard L. Bloch (1929–2018), American investor, real estate developer, banker, and philanthropist
- Richard Branson (born 1950), British businessman and founder of the Virgin Group of companies
- Richard Deeb (1924–1990), American real estate developer
- Richard DeVos (1926–2018), American businessman and co-founder of Amway
- Richard Jacobs (businessman) (1925–2009), American real estate businessman and owner of the Cleveland Indians baseball team
- Richard W. Kent, American businessman and baseball team proprietor
- Richard Morefield (1929–2010), American diplomat
- Richard Oetker (born 1951), German businessman, CEO of Dr. Oetker since 2010
- Richard Rawlings (born 1969), star of American television show Fast N' Loud, owner of Gas Monkey garage, Gas Monkey Bar N' Grill and Gas Monkey Live
- Richard Warren Sears (1863–1914), co-founder of Sears, Roebuck and Company, and considered a promotional genius
- Richard Velazquez (born 1973), PepsiCo executive and first automotive designer at Porsche AG (Germany) of Puerto Rican descent
- Richard Wilding, British businessman and academic

=== In music ===
==== Composers ====
- Rich Batsford (born 1969), English pianist, composer and singer-songwriter
- Richard Rodney Bennett (1936–2012), English composer
- Richard Dybeck (1811–1877), Swedish lyricist who wrote the national anthem of Sweden
- Richard Heuberger (1850–1924), Austrian composer of operas and operettas, music critic, and teacher
- Richard D. James (musician) (born 1971), British composer and electronic musician, records music as Aphex Twin, among other monikers
- Richard Mohaupt (1904–1957), German-American composer and conductor
- Dick Oatts, American jazz saxophonist, multi-instrumentalist, composer, and educator
- Richard Rodgers (1902–1979), American composer
- Richard Strauss (1864–1949), German composer and conductor
- Richard Wagner (1813–1883), German composer, writer, conductor and theatre director

==== Singers and musicians ====
- Richard "Big Daddy Ritch" Anderson, lead vocalist for American red dirt metal band Texas Hippie Coalition
- Richard Ashcroft (born 1971), former singer with The Verve
- Rick Astley (born 1966), English singer best known for his 1987 song "Never Gonna Give You Up", which became an internet meme known as Rickrolling
- Ritchie Blackmore (born 1945), lead guitarist of Deep Purple, Rainbow, Blackmore's Night
- Richard Butler (singer) (born 1956), lead singer of the Psychedelic Furs
- Richard Carpenter (musician) (born 1946), one half of The Carpenters
- Rick Chertoff, American music producer
- Richard Clayderman (born 1953), French pianist
- Rick Danko (1943–1999), bassist and singer for The Band
- Rick Davies (1944–2025) musician, singer, songwriter, formerly of Supertramp
- Richard Sulogowski (born 1955), American heavy metal bassist known as Rik Fox
- Richie Havens (1941–2013), American singer-songwriter and guitarist
- Richard Henshall (born 1984), main composer, guitarist and keyboardist of Haken
- Richard Kruspe (born 1967), lead guitarist of Rammstein
- Richard Manuel (1943–1986), pianist and vocalist of The Band
- Richard Marx (born 1963), American singer-songwriter
- Richard Lewis (tenor) (1914–1990), British tenor
- Richard McCracken (born 1948), bassist with Irish rock group 'Taste'
- Richard Theodore Otcasek (1944–2019), known as Ric Ocasek, frontman for the Cars
- Richard Patrick (born 1968), lead singer and guitarist of Filter
- Richard Wayne Penniman (1932–2020), birth name of Little Richard, American rock and roll singer
- Rich Perry, American jazz tenor saxophonist
- Richard Starkey (born 1940), birth name of Ringo Starr, drummer of The Beatles
- Richard Tauber (1891–1948), Austrian tenor
- Richard Thompson (musician) (born 1949), singer, songwriter and guitarist
- Richard Thurston (born 1973), American musician
- Ritchie Valens (1941–1959), singer, songwriter and guitarist
- Richard Wright (musician) (1943–2008), keyboard player for Pink Floyd
- Richard "Richie" Giese, known as Social Repose, American singer-songwriter and YouTube personality
- Wiley (musician), full name Richard "Wiley" Cowie (born 1979), pioneer of grime music

=== Actors ===
- Richard Berry (born 1950), French actor
- Richard Bohringer (born 1942), French actor
- Richard Brake (born 1964), Welsh and American actor
- Richard Darbois (born 1951), French-Canadian voice actor
- Richard Dean Anderson (born 1950), American actor
- Richard Armitage (actor) (born 1971), English actor
- Richard Attenborough (1923–2014), English actor, director, producer and entrepreneur
- Richard Ayoade (born 1977), English comedian, actor, writer and director
- Richard Belzer (1944–2023), American actor, author, and stand-up comedian
- Richard Beymer (born 1938), American actor, filmmaker and artist
- Richard Biggs (1960–2004), American television and stage actor
- Richard Boone (1917–1981), American actor
- Richard Brake (born 1964), Welsh-American actor
- Richard Brancatisano (born 1983), Australian actor and musician
- Richard Burbage (1568–1619), English actor and theatre owner
- Richard Burgi (born 1958), American actor
- Richard Burton (1925–1984), Welsh actor
- Dick Cavett (born 1936), American television talk show host
- Richard Chamberlain (1934–2025), American actor
- Dick Clark (1929–2012), American radio and television personality
- Richard Crenna (1926–2003), American actor
- Richard Curtis (born 1956), British screenwriter, music producer, actor and film director
- Richard Dreyfuss (born 1947), American actor
- Richard Ely (1945–2019), American actor, singer and voice actor
- Richard Dysart (1929–2015), American actor
- Richard Fleeshman (born 1989), English actor and singer
- Richard Franklin (actor) (1936–2023), English actor, writer, director and political activist
- Richard Gere (born 1949), American actor
- Richard Gomez (born 1966), Filipino athlete, television presenter, actor, director and politician
- Richard E. Grant (born 1957), English actor
- Richard Grieco (born 1965), American actor
- Richard Gutierrez (born 1984), Filipino actor
- Richard Harris (1930–2002), Irish actor, singer-songwriter, theatrical producer, film director and writer
- Richard Heffer (born 1946), British television and film actor
- Richard Steven Horvitz (born 1966), American actor and comedian
- Richard Jaeckel (1926–1997), American actor
- Richard Kiel (1939–2014), American actor
- Richard Kind (born 1956), American actor
- Richard Libertini, American actor
- Richard Madden (born 1986), Scottish actor
- Cheech Marin (Richard Anthony Marin, born 1946), American actor and comedian, known for the comedy duo Cheech & Chong
- Richard Pryor (1940–2005), American stand-up comedian and actor
- Richard Roundtree (1942–2023), American actor
- Richard Roxburgh (born 1962), Australian actor
- Richard Schulefand (1923–1987), American actor and comedian professionally known as Dick Shawn
- Peter Sellers (1925–1980), British actor born Richard Henry Sellers
- Richard Herbert Seneviratne (1925–1998), Sri Lankan Sinhala actor and filmmaker
- Richard Simmons (actor) (1913–2003), American actor
- Richard Simmons (1948–2024), American fitness personality and actor
- Richard Speight, Jr. (born 1970), American actor
- Richard Thomas (actor) (born 1951), American actor
- Richard Todd (1919–2009), Irish-born English actor
- Dick Van Dyke (born 1925), American actor, comedian, writer and producer
- Richard H. Wasai (1932–2003), American politician
- Richard Widmark (1914–2008), American actor
- Richard Yap (born 1967), Filipino actor, singer, and model

=== In film and television ===
- Richard James Branda (1935–1993), American actor and writer
- Richard Donner (1930–2021), American film director and producer
- Richard Edlund (born 1940), American special effects cinematographer
- Richard Hatch (actor) (1945–2017), American actor, writer and producer
- Richard Hatch (Survivor contestant) (born 1961), American television personality, winner of Survivor: Borneo
- Richard Hammond (born 1969), British television presenter
- Richard Hunt (puppeteer) (1951–1992), American puppeteer who performed a number of the Muppets
- Richard M. Isackes, American theatre scholar and stage designer
- Richard Juan (born 1992), Hong Kong model and television host based in the Philippines
- Richard Lester (born 1932), American film director based in the UK
- Richard Linklater (born 1960), Texas filmmaker
- Richard Osman (born 1970), British television presenter and author
- Rich Vos (born 1957), American comedian
- Richard Wenk (born 1956), American director and screenwriter
- Richard Whiteley (1943–2005), British television personality and journalist
- Richard Whitley (born 1948), American screenwriter and producer
- Richard Williams (animator) (1933–2019), Canadian-British animator
- Richard D. Zanuck (1934–2012), American film producer

=== Explorers ===
- Richard R. Arnold (born 1963), American astronaut
- Richard Francis Burton (1821–1890), British geographer, explorer, translator, writer, soldier, orientalist, cartographer, ethnologist, spy, linguist, poet, fencer and diplomat
- Richard E. Byrd (1888–1957), US Navy rear admiral, aviator and explorer
- Richard Masters (aka William Marsters), English sailor, cooper, trader and explorer
- Dick Rutkowski, American diving medicine pioneer

=== Scientists ===
- Richard Lee Armstrong (1937–1991), American-Canadian geologist
- Richard Barohn, American neurologist
- Richard Dawkins (born 1941), English ethologist, evolutionary biologist and author
- Richard Feynman (1918–1988), American Nobel Prize-winning physicist
- Richard Hall (archaeologist) (1949–2011), English archaeologist
- Richard D. Hansen, American archaeologist
- Richard D. James (scientist) (born 1952), American mechanician and materials scientist
- Richard Klophaus (born 1965), German economist
- Richard von Krafft-Ebing (1840–1902), Austro-German baron, psychiatrist and author of the foundational work Psychopathia Sexualis
- Richard Lauwaars (born 1940), Dutch law professor and judge
- Richard Leakey (1944–2022), Kenyan politician, paleoanthropologist and conservationist
- Richard Royal Lunt (born 1982), American chemical engineer and physicist
- Richard Lydekker (1849–1915), English naturalist, geologist and writer
- Richard Pokorný (born 1979), Czech paleontologist and speleologist
- Richard Pringle, American psychologist and professor
- Richard Beck (scholar) (1897–1980), American literary historian
- Richard von Mises (1883–1953), Austrian-American scientist and mathematician
- Richard Bruce Paris (1946–2022), British mathematician
- Richard F. Post (1918–2015), American physicist
- Richard A. Rachubinski, Canadian cell biologist and academic
- Richard Smalley (1943–2005), American chemist
- Richard Swedberg (born 1948), Swedish sociologist at Cornell University
- Richard Totman (1949–2009), British psychologist
- Richard Tully (born 1943), Canadian-born American astronomer
- Richard Ulevitch, Chairman Emeritus of the Department of Immunology at The Scripps Research Institute.
- Richard R. Wilk (born 1953), American anthropologist

=== In sports ===
- Richard (footballer, born 1991), Richard de Oliveira Costa, Brazilian football goalkeeper
- Richard (footballer, born 1994), Richard Candido Coelho, Brazilian football defensive midfielder
- Richard (footballer, born 1999), Richard Alexandre Birkheun Rodrigues, Brazilian football winger
- Richard (footballer, born 2003), Richard dos Santos de Almeida, Brazilian football left back
- Dick Attlesey (1929–1984), American hurdler
- Dick Ault (1925–2007), American Olympian
- Rink Babka (1936–2022), American discus thrower
- Dick Barber (1910–1983), American long jumper
- Richard Bleier (born 1987), major league baseball pitcher for the New York Yankees and Baltimore Orioles
- Dick Butkus (1942–2023), American footballer and actor
- Richard Charland (born 1956), Canadian professional wrestler
- Richard Chelimo (1972–2001), Kenyan long-distance runner
- Richard Childress (born 1945), NASCAR Cup Series team owner and former American race car driver
- Dick Davis (running back) (born 1946), American football player
- Dick Davis (defensive end) (1938–2021), American football player
- Richard Kirk Dunwell (born 1971), English footballer
- Richard Fellers (born 1959), American Olympic equestrian
- Dick Fencl (1910–1972), American football player
- Richard Fliehr (born 1949), American professional wrestler known as Ric Flair
- Richard Freitag (born 1991), German ski jumper
- Richard Gasquet (born 1986), French tennis player
- Richard Giachetti, former NASCAR Cup Series team owner
- Richard Gleeson (born 1987), English cricketer
- Sir Richard Hadlee, New Zealand cricketer
- Rick Hansen (born 1957), Canadian paraplegic athlete, activist and philanthropist
- Rickey Henderson (born 1958), American baseball left fielder
- Rich Houston (1945–1982), American football player
- Richard Howell (born 1990), American-Israeli basketball player in the Israeli Basketball Premier League
- Richard Jacob (born 1958), American basketball coach
- Richard Jarvis (American football) (born 1995), American football player
- Richard Jibunor (born 1999) Nigerian gridiron football player
- Richard Johansson (1882–1952), Swedish figure skater, silver medalist at the 1908 Olympics
- Dick Johnson (racing driver) (born 1945), Australian touring car driver & team owner
- Richard Jordan (American football) (born 1972), American football player
- Richard van Kempen (born 1964), Dutch speed skater
- Richard Kilty (born 1989), English sprinter
- Richard Kingi (born 1989), Australian-New Zealand rugby union player
- Richard Krajicek (born 1971), Dutch professional tennis player, Wimbledon winner in 1996
- Rick Lackman (1910–1990), American football player
- Richard Limo (born 1980), Kenyan long-distance runner
- Richard Mateelong (born 1983), Kenyan runner
- Richard Medlin (born 1987), American football player
- Richard Moguena (born 1986), Chadian basketball player
- Richard Mullaney (born 1993), American football player
- Richard Nerurkar (born 1964), British long-distance runner
- Richard Newland (cricketer) (1713–1778), English cricketer
- Richard Ord (born 1970), English former footballer
- Richard Petruška (born 1969), Slovak-Italian basketball player
- Richard Petty (born 1937), former NASCAR driver
- Richard Piñanez (born 1991), former Paraguayan footballer
- Dick Pound (born 1942), Canadian swimmer, first president of the World Anti-Doping Agency, and former vice-president of the International Olympic Committee
- Richard Raskind, changed name to Renée Richards (born 1934), tennis player
- Dick Savitt (1927–2023), American tennis player
- Richard Sears (tennis) (1861–1943), winner of seven consecutive US tennis championships
- Richard Sewu (born 1996), Ghanaian footballer
- Richard Sherman (American football) (born 1988), defensive back for the Seattle Seahawks
- Richard Sosa (born 1972), Uruguayan footballer
- Dick Stanfel (1927–2015), American football player
- Rich Stotter (1945–2015), American football player
- Dick Schweidler (1914–2010), American football player
- Richard Swann (born 1991), American professional wrestler
- Dick Tayler (born 1948), New Zealand long-distance runner
- Richard Thompson (sprinter) (born 1985), Trinidadian sprinter
- Richard Todd (American football) (born 1953), American football player in the NFL
- Richard Virenque (born 1969), French cyclist
- Richard Washington (born 1955), American basketball player
- Richárd Weisz (1879–1945), Hungarian Olympic champion Greco-Roman wrestler
- Richard White (racing driver) (born 1939), American racing driver
- Richie Williams (basketball) (born 1987), American basketball player
- Richard Williams (tennis coach) (born 1942), American tennis coach, the father of Venus and Serena Williams
- Richard Witschge (born 1969), Dutch footballer
- Richard Wojciak (born 1982), British ice hockey forward

=== Soldiers, pilots, other military/security ===
- Richard Baer (1911–1963), German Nazi SS concentration camp commandant
- Richard Binder (1839–1912), Kingdom of Württemberg born American Medal of Honor recipient
- Richard de Crespigny (born 1957), Australian commercial airline pilot
- Richard von Conta, German general, notable for his participation in the Battle of Belleau Wood
- Richard S. Ewell (1817–1872), American Civil War Confederate general
- Richard F. Gordon Jr. (1929–2017), American naval officer and aviator, chemist, test pilot, and NASA astronaut, and an American football executive
- Richard FitzAlan, 10th Earl of Arundel (c. 1306–1376), English military leader
- Richard FitzAlan, 11th Earl of Arundel (1346–1397), English military commander
- Richard G. Graves, lieutenant general in the United States Army, commander of III Corps and Fort Hood
- Richard J. Flaherty (1945–2015), United States Army captain
- Richard H. Truly (1937–2024)), US Navy fighter pilot, engineer, former astronaut for both the US Air Force and NASA, and NASA's Administrator
- Richard Howe, 1st Earl Howe (1726–1799), British naval commander in the American War of Independence and the French Revolutionary Wars
- Rick Husband (1957–2003), American astronaut and fighter pilot
- Rich Knighton (born 1969), senior officer in the RAF and Chief of the Defence Staff for the UK.
- Richard M. Linnehan (born 1957), United States Army veterinarian and a NASA astronaut
- Richard Lizurey (born 1958), French National Gendarmerie general
- Richard Marcinko (1940–2021), US Navy SEAL commander and Vietnam War veteran
- Richard Coke Marshall Jr. (1879–1961), American brigadier general
- Richard Michael Mullane (born 1945), American engineer and aircraft pilot, a retired USAF officer
- Richard Myers (born 1942), US Air Force general, Vice Chairman of the Joint Chiefs of Staff (2000–2001) and Chairman (2001–2005)
- Richard N. Richards (born 1946), American naval officer and aviator, test pilot, chemical engineer, and a former NASA astronaut
- Richard Ruoff, general in the Wehrmacht of Nazi Germany
- Richard H. Rush (1825–1893), American military officer
- Richard O'Connor (1889–1981), British Army officer and military commander
- Richard O. Covey (born 1946), United States Air Force officer and former NASA astronaut
- Richard Savage, 4th Earl Rivers (c. 1660 – 1712), English army officer and noted rake
- Dick Scobee (1939–1986), American pilot, engineer and astronaut, killed while commanding the Space Shuttle Challenger
- Richard A. Searfoss (1956–2018), American aviator who was United States Air Force colonel, NASA astronaut and test pilot
- Richard Sorge (1895–1944), Soviet World War II spy
- Richard Taylor (Confederate general) (1826–1879), American Civil War Confederate general
- Richard Thomalla (1903–1945), SS commander of Nazi Germany, civil engineer, head of the SS Central Building Administration
- Richard Udugama (1911–1995), 6th Commander of the Sri Lanka Army
- Richard von Hegener (1905–1981), German official, primary organizer of Action T4 Nazi euthanasia program
- Richard Winters (1918–2011), US Army major and Second World War veteran
- Richard von Schubert, German army commander

=== Writers and journalists ===
- Richard Adams (1920–2016), English author, best known for the novel Watership Down
- Richard Argall (fl. 1621), a poet, of whom little is known and whose existence is disputed
- Richard Armstrong (author) (1903–1986), English author, recipient of the 1948 Carnegie medal for children's literature
- Richard Baier (born 1926), German former journalist and radio presenter
- Richard Bernabe, American photographer and author
- Richard N. Billings, American writer and reporter
- Richard Bovet (1641-?), English author
- Dick Brennan (journalist), American local TV news anchor/reporter
- Richard Cull Jr. (1914–1992), American journalist
- Richard Engel (born 1973), American journalist and author
- Richard Herrmann (journalist) (1919–2010), Norwegian journalist, writer and radio personality
- Richard Hole (1746–1803), English poet and priest
- Richard Marfuggi, American author and plastic surgeon
- Rick Riordan (born 1964), American author, creator of Percy Jackson & the Olympians
- Richard Rudgley (born 1961), British anthropologist and writer on paganism
- Richard Scarry (1919–1994), American children's author and illustrator, known for his "Busytown" fictional universe and multimedia franchise
- Richard E. Sprague, American computer technician, researcher and author
- Richard Templar, pen name of Richard Craze (1950–2006), British author and editor
- Richard Wright (author) (1908–1960), American novelist, poet, essayist, short story writer
- Richard Yates (1926–1992) American novelist and short story writer
- Richard de Zoysa (1958–1990), Sri Lankan journalist, author, human rights activist and actor who was abducted and murdered

=== Crime ===
- Richard Angelo (born 1962), American serial killer and former nurse
- Richard H. Barter (1833–1859), Canadian fugitive and murder victim
- Richard Baumhammers (born 1965), American former immigration attorney and spree killer
- Richard Biegenwald (1940–2008), American serial killer
- Richard Cain (1931–1973), Chicago police officer who worked with organized crime
- Richard Michael Cartwright (1974–2005), American murderer
- Richard Chase (1950–1980), American cannibalistic serial killer, mass murderer, and necrophile
- Richard Chung (1951–1992), American Benedictine monk who committed suicide after police investigated into his possible sexual abuse of a boy
- Richard Clarey (born 1960), German-American murderer and self-confessed serial killer
- Richard Cooey (1967–2008), American murderer
- Richard Cottingham (born 1946), American serial killer
- Richard Allen Davis (born 1954), American career criminal and convicted killer of Polly Klaas'
- Richard Delage (born 1944), American murderer
- Richard Djerf (born 1969), American mass murderer
- Richard Evonitz (1963–2002), American serial killer, kidnapper, and rapist
- Richard Farley (born 1948), American stalker and perpetrator of the Sunnyvale ESL shooting
- Richard Hauptmann (1899–1936), perpetrator of the Lindbergh kidnapping
- Richard Hickock (1931–1965), American mass murderer who killed the Clutter family with Perry Smith
- Richard James (1957–1975), convicted murderer in Singapore
- Richard "Ricky" Kasso Jr (1967–1984), American murderer
- Richard Kuklinski (1935–2006), American hitman and serial killer
- Richard Lee Richards (1960–2021), American man who was fatally shot by a police officer
- Richard Laurence Marquette (born 1934), American convicted serial killer
- Richard Matt (1966–2015), American convicted murderer and prison escapee
- Richard Ramirez (1960–2013), American serial killer, rapist, and burglar
- Richard Speck (1941–1991), American rapist and mass murderer
- Dick Turpin (1705–1739), English Highwayman

=== Other ===
- Richard R. Arnold (born 1963), American educator and astronaut
- Dick Assman (1934–2016), Canadian gas station owner
- Richard Avedon (1923–2004), American fashion and portrait photographer
- Richard Bergh (1858–1919), Swedish painter
- Richard Bertinet, baker and teacher
- Richard Blackwell (1922–2008), American fashion critic best known for his annual "worst dressed" lists
- Richard Blahut (born 1937), American engineer
- Richard Blass (1945–1975), Canadian gangster and a multiple murderer
- Richard Tyler Blevins (born 1991), American gamer and YouTube personality
- Richard M. Candee, American historian and preservationist
- Richard Corneil, Canadian academic administrator.
- Richard von Coudenhove-Kalergi (1894–1972), Austrian-Japanese count, founding president of the Paneuropean Union
- Richard S. Crossin (1933–2003), collector and ornithologist
- Richard J. Estes, academic
- Richard Everitt (1979–1994), victim of a racially motivated murder in London
- Richard A. Florsheim (1916–1979), American painter
- Richard Garriott (born 1961), British-American video game developer, entrepreneur and private astronaut
- Richard Gerstl (1883–1908), Austrian painter
- Richard Gurnon, president of Massachusetts Maritime Academy
- Richard Gutekunst (1870–1961), German art dealer
- Richard Harris (anaesthetist), Australian anaesthetist and cave diver
- Richard Heber (1773–1833), English book collector
- Richard Helms (naturalist) (1842–1914), Australian naturalist
- Richard Hemming, Singapore-based Master of Wine and educator
- Richard Hieb (born 1955), American astronaut
- Richard Hirschbäck (1937–2007), Austrian painter
- Richard Holder (born 1974), Belizean visual artist
- Richard Gerald Jordan (1946–2025), American convicted murderer
- Richard Kavner, trade union official
- Richard Ling (born 1954), Shaw Foundation professor of Media Technology at Nanyang Technological University, Singapore
- Richard Lugner (1932–2024), Austrian entrepreneur and Viennese society figure
- Richard Lyne (1570–1600), English painter and engraver
- Richard Mastracchio (born 1960), American engineer and astronaut
- Richard Maury (1882–1950), American naturalized Argentine engineer
- Richard McLean (Australia), Australian illustrator, writer, musician, artist and digital artist
- Richard Mishaan, American interior designer
- Richard Murphy (Captain) (1838–1916), American fishing schooner captain
- Richard A. Pauling (1809–1881), portrait and landscape artist
- Richard Popkin (1923–2005), academic philosopher
- Richard Picker (1915–1983), American numismatist
- Richard Price-Williams (1827–1916), British engineer
- Richard Rorty (1931–2007), American philosopher
- Richard Samuel (1770–1786), English portrait painter
- Richard Stallman (born 1953), American free software movement activist and programmer
- Richard Ulrich (born 1942), German board game designer
- Richard von Volkmann (1830–1889), German surgeon and author of poetry and fiction
- Richard Wurmbrand, Romanian Evangelical Lutheran priest and professor

=== Fictional characters ===
- Richard Chandra, title character of the 2018 animated film Richard the Stork
- Richard, title character of the 2017 animated film Richard the Stork
- Richard, a character in 1989 American independent coming of age comedy movie She's Out of Control
- Richard, a character in the 2013 American black comedy crime film Life of Crime
- Richard, a character in the TV series Peg + Cat
- Richard, a character in the TV series Unikitty!
- Richard Ashenden, main character in the 1936 Hitchcock film Secret Agent (1936 film)
- Richard "Richie" Aprile, a character on The Sopranos
- Richard Blaine, main character in the 1942 film Casablanca
- Richard Blaney, main character in the film Frenzy
- Richard Burke, recurring character in NBC show Friends, played by Tom Selleck
- Richard Cobb, one of the main characters in the 1940 American horror science fiction film The Invisible Man Returns
- Richard Cole, a character in the film Liar Liar
- Richard Cole, a journalist in The Power Of Five Series, and Matthew Freeman's best friend and protector
- Dick Dastardly, a character from various Hanna-Barbera cartoons
- Rick Deckard, the title character in the film Blade Runner
- Richard Diamond, private detective protagonist of Richard Diamond, Private Detective, which aired on radio from 1949 to 1953, and on television from 1957 to 1960
- Richard Fenton, in the 1994 miniseries, Scarlett (miniseries)
- Richard John "Dick" Grayson, the first Robin, Batman's sidekick
- Richard Hannay, main character in the novel The Thirty Nine Steps
- Richard Chandra, title character of the 2018 animated film Richard the Stork
- Richard, title character of the 2017 animated film Richard the Stork
- Richard, a character in 1989 American independent coming of age comedy movie She's Out of Control
- Richard, a character in the 2013 American black comedy crime film Life of Crime
- Richard, a character in the TV series Peg + Cat
- Richard, a character in the TV series Unikitty!
- Richard Ashenden, main character in the 1936 Hitchcock film Secret Agent (1936 film)
- Richard "Richie" Aprile, a character on The Sopranos
- Richard Blaine, main character in the 1942 film Casablanca
- Richard Blaney, main character in the film Frenzy
- Richard Burke, recurring character in NBC show Friends, played by Tom Selleck
- Richard Cobb, one of the main characters in the 1940 American horror science fiction film The Invisible Man Returns
- Richard Cole, a character in the film Liar Liar
- Richard Cole, a journalist in The Power Of Five Series, and Matthew Freeman's best friend and protector
- Dick Dastardly, a character from various Hanna-Barbera cartoons
- Rick Deckard, the title character in the film Blade Runner
- Richard Diamond, private detective protagonist of Richard Diamond, Private Detective, which aired on radio from 1949 to 1953, and on television from 1957 to 1960
- Richard Fenton, in the 1994 miniseries, Scarlett (miniseries)
- Richard John "Dick" Grayson, the first Robin, Batman's sidekick
- Richard Hannay, main character in the novel The Thirty Nine Steps
- Richard Hillman, serial killer in the British soap opera Coronation Street
- Richard Kimble, lead character in 1963 American TV series The Fugitive
- Dr. Richard Kimble, as the main character played by Harrison Ford in the 1993 American action thriller movie The Fugitive
- Richard Kneeland, a character in the movie 13 Going on 30
- Richard Mayhew, main character in the television series Neverwhere
- Richard Michaels, a character in the 1989 American science-fiction drama movie Beyond the Stars
- Richard Rank, a character in the 1997 American science fiction drama movie Contact
- Richie Rich (character), main character of the Richie Rich series
- Richard Richard, one of the protagonists of British sitcom Bottom
- Richie Ryan (Highlander), one of the main characters on Highlander: The Series, played by Stan Kirsch
- Richard "Rick" Sanchez, main character on Rick and Morty
- Richard Sharpe, main character in the Sharpe novel series, portrayed by Sean Bean in TV adaptations
- Richard Splett, a character in Veep, portrayed by Sam Richardson
- Richard Bluedhorn "Rick" or "Ricky" Stratton, the main character in the American TV sitcom Silver Spoons
- Richard "Richie" Tozier, one of the protagonis
- Richard Hillman, serial killer in the British soap opera Coronation Street
- Richard Kimble, lead character in 1963 American TV series The Fugitive
- Dr. Richard Kimble, as the main character played by Harrison Ford in the 1993 American action thriller movie The Fugitive
- Richard Kneeland, a character in the movie 13 Going on 30
- Richard Mayhew, main character in the television series Neverwhere
- Richard Michaels, a character in the 1989 American science-fiction drama movie Beyond the Stars
- Richard Rank, a character in the 1997 American science fiction drama movie Contact
- Richie Rich (character), main character of the Richie Rich series
- Richard Richard, one of the protagonists of British sitcom Bottom
- Richie Ryan (Highlander), one of the main characters on Highlander: The Series, played by Stan Kirsch
- Richard "Rick" Sanchez, main character on Rick and Morty
- Richard Sharpe, main character in the Sharpe novel series, portrayed by Sean Bean in TV adaptations
- Richard Splett, a character in Veep, portrayed by Sam Richardson
- Richard Bluedhorn "Rick" or "Ricky" Stratton, the main character in the American TV sitcom Silver Spoons
- Richard "Richie" Tozier, one of the protagonists in 1986 novel It
- Richard Tweak, father of Tweek Tweak from South Park
- Richard Vincent, in the 2001 miniseries The SoulTaker, the father of the title character
- Richard Watterson, a character from the 2011 TV series The Amazing World of Gumball
- Richard Wharfinger, fictional playwright of "The Courier's Tale" in Thomas Pynchon's The Crying of Lot 49
- Richard Wheatley, a villain from the TV series Law & Order: Special Victims Unit
- Prince Richard, a character in the 1992 Nintendo Game Boy game Kaeru no Tame ni Kane wa Naru
- Richard Ranasinghe de Vulpian, née Claremont, the titular character of The Case Files of Jeweler Richard

== Cognates/transliterations ==
=== In Indo-European languages ===
==== Baltic ====
- Latvian: Ričards, Rihards, Rišārs
- Lithuanian: Ričardas

==== Celtic ====
- Breton: Richarzh
- Cornish: Richard
- Irish: Risteárd, Riocard
- Manx: Rigard
- Scottish Gaelic: Ruiseart
- Welsh: Rhisiart

==== Germanic ====
- English: Richard
- Afrikaans: Riekert, Ryk, Rigard, Righard, Reghard
- Danish: Rikard, Ryker, Richard, Richardt
- Dutch: Rijkert, Rikkert, Ryker, Rigard, Richart, Richard, Richardt
- Gothic: RekkareÞ (Reccared)
- Icelandic: Ríkharð, Ríkharður
- German: Rieker, Ri(c)kert, Riker, Richard, Richart, Richardt, Reichard, Reichart, Reichardt, Reichert
- Norwegian: Rikard, Richard
- Swedish: Rikard, Richard, Rickard

==== Romance ====
- Catalan: Ricard
- Galician: Ricardo
- Valencian: Ricard
- Occitan: Ricard
- French: Richard, pronounced as /ʁi.ʃaʁ/
- Italian: Riccardo, Ricciardo
- Latin: Ricardus, or Richardus
- Portuguese: Ricardo
- Romanian: Richard, Riciard
- Spanish: Ricardo

==== Slavic ====
- Belarusian: Рычард (Ryčard)
- Serbo-Croatian: Rikard
- Bulgarian: Ричард (Richard)
- Macedonian: Ричард (Ričard)
- Czech: Richard
- Polish: Ryszard
- Russian: Ричард (Richard)
- Slovak: Richard
- Slovene: Rihard
- Ukrainian: Річард (Richard)

==== Other Indo-European ====
- Albanian: Riçard
- Armenian: Հռիքարտոս (Hṙikartós)
- Greek: Ριχάρδος (Richárdos)
- Persian: ریچارد (Ričārd)

=== In Semitic languages ===
- Arabic: ريتشارد (Rytshard, Ritshard, Rytshard, Ritshard)
- Hebrew: ריצ'רד (Rîtsard')
- Tamazight: ⵔⵉⴽⴰⵔⴷ (Rikard)
- Amharic: ሪቻርድ (Rīcharidi)
- Tigrinya: ሪቻርድ (Ričārede)

=== In Cushitic languages ===
- Afar language: Richardi
- Oromo language: Riichaard
- Somali: Ritshard

=== In Malayo-Polynesian languages ===
- Tagalog: Ricardo (Baybayin: ᜇᜒᜃᜇ᜔ᜇᜓ, ᜇᜒᜃᜇᜇᜓ)
- Bisaya: Ricardo

=== In Turkic languages ===
- Azerbaijani: Riçard
- Turkish: Rişar
- Kazakh: Ричард (Rïçard)
- Kyrgyz: Ричард (Riçard)
- Uyghur: رىچارد (Riçard)
- Bashkir Ричард (Ričard)
- Tuvan: Ричард (Ričard)
- Turkmen language: Riçard

=== In Uralic languages ===
- Estonian: Richard
- Finnish: Rikhard, Riku
- Hungarian: Richárd, Ricsárd
- Meadow Mari language: Ричард (Ričard)
- Saami: Rikkar
- Udmurt: Ричард (Richard)

=== In other languages ===
- Basque: Rikard
- Chinese: 理查德 (Lǐchádé), 理查 (Lǐchá)
- Esperanto: Rikardo
- Japanese: リチャード (Richādo)
- Korean: 리처드
- Māori: Riki
- Mongolian language: Ричард (Richard)

== Short forms ==
- Cornish: Hicca
- Czech: Ríša, Rik (Riker)
- Dutch: Ries
- English: Rick, Rich, Richie, Ritchie, Dick, Dicky, Dickie, Ric, Rik, Ricky, Rickie, Dickon, Richy, Ritchy
- Estonian: Riho
- Esperanto: Rikĉjo
- Finnish: Riku
- Greek: Στούκος (Stoúkos)
- Hungarian: Ricsi, Ricsike, Rics
- Icelandic: Rikki
- Italian: Ricky, Riki, Richi
- Latvian: Ričs
- Lithuanian: Ryčka, Rytis
- Polish: Rysio, Rysiek, Ryś
- Portuguese: Rico, Ric
- Romanian: Richi
- Slovak: Rišo, Riško, Riči
- Spanish: Cayo (Guatemala)
- Swiss/German: Richi

== Nicknames ==
- English: Ricky, Rickie, Rikki, Richie, Rich, Dick, Dicky, Dickie, Ritchie, Richy, Rick, Ritchy, Rico

== See also ==
- Richarda
- Richardis (given name)
- Richart
- Richardt
- Dickon, a given name derived from the old English name for Richard
