= Richard Burton (disambiguation) =

Richard Burton (1925–1984) was a Welsh actor.
Richard Francis Burton (1821–1890), was an English explorer, author, translator and orientalist.

Richard or Dick Burton may also refer to:

== Sports ==
- Richard Burton (footballer) (1889–1939), English footballer
- Dick Burton (baseball) (1907–?), American baseball player
- Dick Burton (golfer) (1907–1974), English golfer
- Richard Burton (cricketer, born 1955), English cricketer
- Richard Burton (cricketer, born 1976), English cricketer

== Others ==
- Nathaniel Crouch (a.k.a. "Richard Burton", 1632–1725), English printer, bookseller, and history writer
- Richard Henry Burton (1923–1993), English soldier and recipient of the Victoria Cross
- Richard M. Burton (born 1939), American organizational theorist
- Ted Bundy (a.k.a. "Richard Burton", 1946–1989), American serial killer
- Richard Burton (journalist), British journalist
- Richard Burton (Baltimore), American hip-hop artist and television actor
- Richard Burton (comics), British comic writer and editor

== See also ==
- Richard Bruton (born 1953), Irish government minister
