= Richard O'Connell =

Richard O'Connell may refer to:

- Richard O'Connell (politician) (1892–1964), Irish politician
- Dick O'Connell (Richard Henry O'Connell, 1914–2002), American businessperson
- Rick O'Connell, the central protagonist of The Mummy series
- Richard J. O'Connell (1941–2015), American geophysicist
- Richard O'Connell (bishop), Bishop of Ardfert in 1649

== See also ==
- Richard Connell (disambiguation)
