= Rhisiart =

Rhisiart is a Welsh masculine given name of Norman origin. It is the Welsh form of Richard. The surnames Prichard, Pritchard and Pritchett are anglicisations of Welsh ap Rhisiart (son of Richard). The Welsh surname Richards is also derived from Rhisiart.

== People ==
People with the name Rhisiart include:

- Rhisiart Clwch (Richard Clough, c. 1530–1570), Welsh merchant
- Rhisiart Fynglwyd, 16th century Welsh poet
- Rhisiart Morgan Davies (1903–1958), Welsh physicist
- Rhisiart ap Rhys, 15th-16th century Welsh poet
- Rhisiart Tal-e-bot (born 1975), Welsh activist and politician
