= Ríkharður =

Ríkharður is an Icelandic masculine given name, equivalent to English Richard. Notable people with the name include:

- Ríkharður Daðason (born 1972), Icelandic football player
- Ríkharður Hrafnkelsson (born 1957), Icelandic basketball player
- Ríkharður Jónsson (1929–2017), Icelandic football player and manager
