= Ričardas =

- Pronunciation: Lithuanian: [ˈrʲɪtʃɐrdɐs]
- Gender: Male

Origin
- Region of origin: Lithuania

Ričardas is a Lithuanian masculine given name, a cognate of Richard and may refer to the following individuals:

- Ričardas Bartkevičius (born 1959), Lithuanian painter and educator
- Ricardas Beniušis (born 1980), Lithuanian football striker
- Ričardas Berankis (born 1990), Lithuanian tennis player
- Ričardas Gavelis (1950–2002), Lithuanian writer, playwright and journalist
- Ričardas Kuncaitis (born 1993), Lithuanian boxer
- Ričardas Mikutavičius (1935–1998), Lithuanian priest, theologist, poet and art collector
- Ričardas Tamulis (1938–2008), Lithuanian Olympic boxer
- Ričardas Vaitkevičius (1933–1996), Lithuanian Olympic rower
- Ričardas Zdančius (born 1967), Lithuanian football player
