= Richardt =

Richardt is a given name and surname. It is a variant of Richard. As of 2010, there were 372 people with the surname Richardt in the United States.

== Surname ==
- Christian Richardt (1831–1892), Danish writer
- Ferdinand Richardt (1819–1895), Danish-American artist
- Mike Richardt (born 1958), American baseball player

== Given name ==
- Richardt Frenz (born 1992), South African cricketer
- Richardt Strauss (born 1986), South African rugby union player

== See also ==
- Carl Richardt Schmidt (1904–1992), Danish rower
- Patrick Henry Richardt House, Evansville, Indiana, US
