= Dickon =

Dickon is an English masculine given name.

The name "Dickon" is derived from the old English name for Richard. Unlike Richard, Dickon is rarely shortened to Dick or Dickie, as it is already commonly considered a short form of the same name.

The first recorded literary reference to the name is of a painting of King Richard III entitled Dickon of York. Marjorie Bowen used that nickname to title her 1929 historical novel Dickon.

== People by the name Dickon ==
- Dickon Edwards (born 1971), London-based indie pop musician, writer, critic, DJ and online diarist
- Dickon Hinchliffe, British composer and former member of Tindersticks
- Dickon Mitchell (born 1977), Prime Minister of Grenada since 2022
- Dickon Tolson (born 1973), British actor

== Fictional characters ==
- Dickon, in "Feathertop" (1852) by Nathaniel Hawthorne
- Dickon, the Devil himself, in the play The Scarecrow (1908) by Percy MacKaye, based on "Feathertop"
- Dickon (Richard) Pyke, the title character in "Dickon the Devil", an 1872 short story by Sheridan Le Fanu
- Dickon Sowerby, one of the main characters in the novel The Secret Garden (1910) by Frances Hodgson Burnett
- Dickon Malbete, a supporting character in The Adventures of Robin Hood (1938), played by Harry Cording
- Bart Dickon, a British comic strip character frequently appearing in the magazine The Chap in the late 1990s
- Dickon Tarly, a character in A Song of Ice and Fire by George R. R. Martin and its TV adaptation
- Dickon Broom, a character in This Is What Happened (2018) by Mick Herron
