= Risteárd =

Irish masculine given name

Risteárd (Irish: [ˈɾˠɪʃtʲaːɾˠd̪ˠ]) is an Irish masculine given name. It is the Irish equivalent of Richard. Risteárd is a French-influenced variant of Riocárd (borne by poet and satirist Riocard Bairéad, for example). Three babies were given the name Risteárd in 1975, but the 1964–1974 period and the following years had less than three babies (or none) given the name annually.

== People ==
People with the name Risteárd include:

- Risteárd Cooper (born 1969), Irish actor, comedian, singer and writer
- Risteard Craobhach (Richard Creagh, c. 1523 – 1586), Irish Catholic clergyman
- Risteard Ó Foghludha (Richard Foley, 1871–1957), Irish-language teacher, journalist and editor
- Risteárd Ó Glaisne (Richard Ernest Giles, 1927–2003), Irish language activist, teacher and writer
- Risteárd de Hae, the Irish name of Richard J. Hayes (1902–1976), Irish code-breaker during WWII and Director of the National Library
- Risteard De Hindeberg (Richard Henebry, 1863–1916), Irish priest, educator, Irish language activist, musician, collector, and author
- Risteárd Buidhe Kirwan (1708–1779), Irish soldier and duellist
- Risteárd Mulcahy (1922–2016), Irish cardiologist and son of Richard Mulcahy
- Risteard de Paor, the Irish name of Richard Power (1928–1970), Irish civil servant and writer
- Risteard Pluincéid (Richard Plunkett, fl. 1662), Franciscan friar and dictionary compiler
- Risteárd de Tiúit (Richard Tuite, d. 1210), Anglo-Norman nobleman
- Risteard Tuibear (Richard Tipper, d. 1730), Gaelic scholar and scribe

== See also ==
- List of Irish-language given names
