= Richart =

Richart is a masculine given name. It is a variant of Richard. Notable people with the name include:

- Richart Báez (born 1973), Paraguayan footballer
- Richart de Berbezill (fl. 1140–1163), French troubadour
- Richart de Fournival (1201–1259/1260), medieval philosopher and trouvère
- Richart de Semilli (fl. ~1200), French trouvère
- Richart E. Slusher (born 1938), American scientist
- Richart Sowa, British artist and creator of Spiral Island

== See also ==
- Emma Belle Richart, the birth name of Emma B. Freeman (1880–1928), American photographer
