= Richard Seymour (disambiguation) =

Richard Seymour (born 1979) is a former American football defensive tackle.

Richard Seymour may also refer to:

- Richard Seymour (cricketer) (born 1946), South African cricketer
- Richard Seymour (photographer), British photographer
- Richard Seymour (18th-century writer), editor of The Compleat Gamester (1722)
- Richard Seymour (21st-century writer) (born 1977), Marxist writer and broadcaster
