= Richard Lizurey =

French National Gendarmerie general (born 1958)

Richard Lizurey

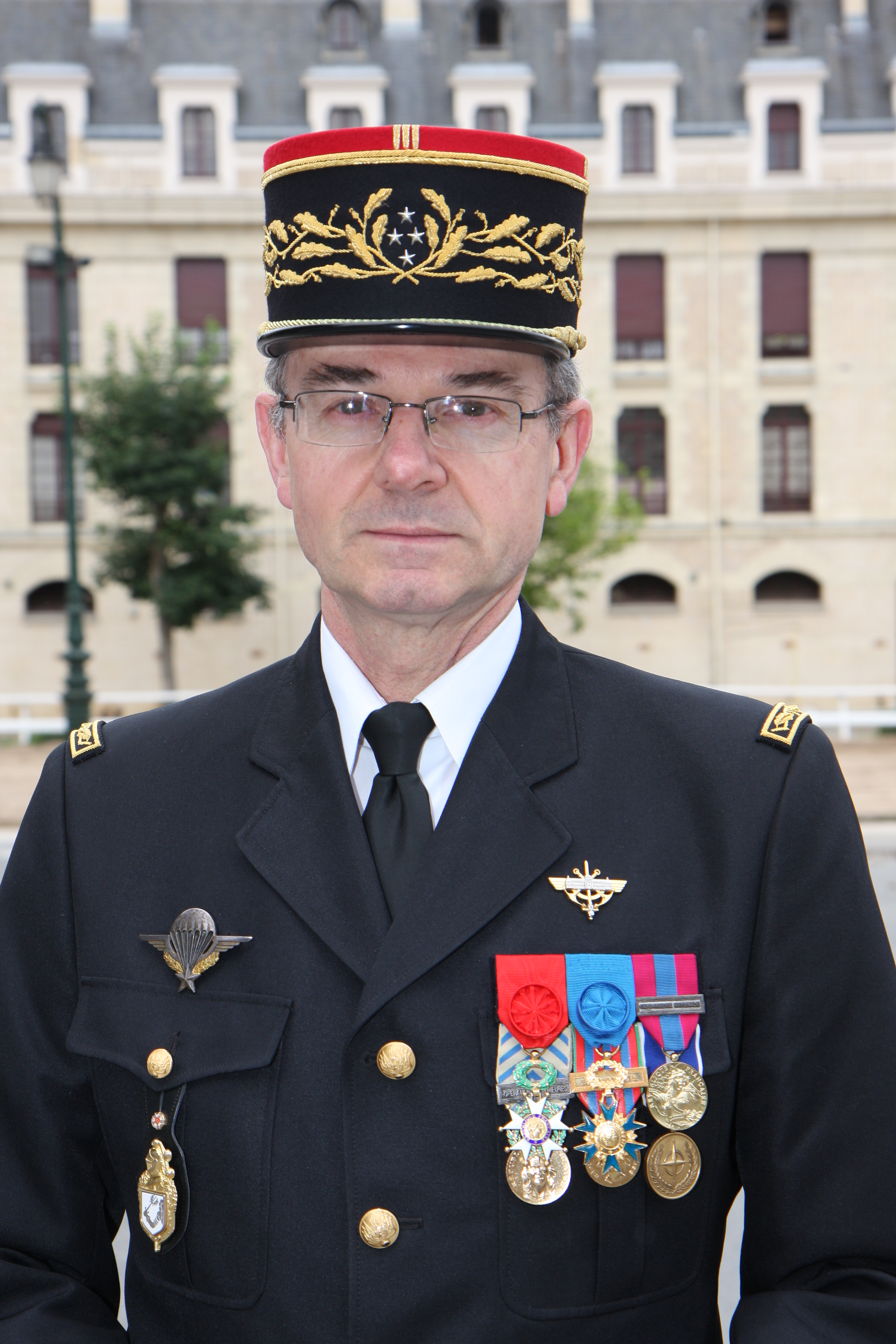
- General Richard Lizurey, France; French Gendarmerie Director General (photographed as General de Corps d'Armée in July 2016)
- Born: 5 November 1958 (age 67)
- Allegiance: France
- Service years: 1981 – 2019
- Commands: National Gendarmerie Director General (Chief of staff)

Richard Lizurey (born 5 November 1958) is a French National Gendarmerie retired general. He has served as Director General (Chief of staff) from 1 September 2016. to 31 october 2019.

== Biography ==
Richard Lizurey graduated from the French military academy and the French Gendarmerie nationale Officers School.

He successively served as platoon leader in Berlin (1981), gendarmerie mobile squadron commanding officer in Troyes (1985) and gendarmerie départementale company commander in Aubagne (1991).

In 1994, he became a project manager in the office of the Gendarmerie chief of staff.

Promoted to lieutenant colonel in 1997, he was posted to the French Ministry of Defence Cabinet, then became a technical advisor in the Cambodian Gendarmerie and finally a legal counselor in Kosovo.

He then served as the head of the Gendarmerie forces of the Haute-Garonne departement, based in Toulouse.

Promoted to colonel in 2002, he was the chief of the general affairs bureau in the office of the chief of staff of the French Gendarmerie.

After taking command of the Gendarmerie region of Corsica in 2007, he was promoted to brigadier-general the same year.

In 2009, he became counsellor in charge of security in the Cabinet of the French Interior ministry.

He became deputy chief of staff (with the rank of Major-General) in 2012 and was finally promoted to chief of staff in 2016 (with the rank of Army General)

== Awards and decorations ==
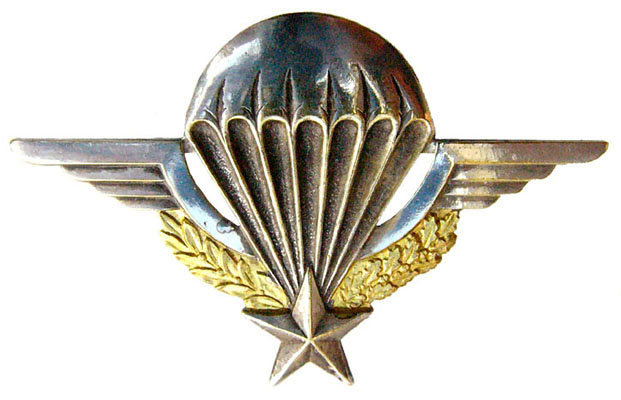

- French Parachutist Badge
- Grand Officer Légion d'honneur (2019)
- Officer Ordre national du Mérite (2007)
- Médaille de la Gendarmerie nationale with bronze palm
- Médaille de la défense nationale, bronze grade
- Médaille de la sécurité intérieure, gold grade
- Médaille de reconnaissance de la Nation
- Médaille commémorative française
- Médaille d’or de l’Administration pénitentiaire
- NATO Medal for Kosovo
- Grand Cross of the Order of Merit of the Civil Guard (2017), Spain

== Sources and references ==
Military offices
Preceded by Denis Favier	Director General of the French National Gendarmerie; 1 September 2016 – date	Succeeded by Incumbent
