= Richard Bernabe =

American photographer

Richard A. Bernabe is an American photographer, teacher and author, specializing in nature, wildlife and travel photography.

== Life and career ==
Bernabe's work has been published by The National Geographic Society, Audubon, The Sierra Club, National Parks, Outdoor Photographer and Popular Photography. In 2005, he received the National Conservation Award by Trout Unlimited.

== Books ==
- Wildlife Photography; Richard Bernabe, Ilex Press, 2018, ISBN 978-1781575123
- Galapagos; Richard Bernabe & Ian Plant
- Spirit of Africa; Richard Bernabe
- Morocco: Two photographers, one vision; Richard Bernabe & Ian Plant
- Namibia: Two photographers, one vision; Richard Bernabe & Ian Plant
- South Carolina: Wonder & light; Richard Bernabe, Mountain Trail Press, 2006, ISBN 978-0977080885
- Creative Photography: 10 easy pieces; Richard Bernabe
- Essential Light: Photography's Lifeblood; Richard Bernabe
- Essential Composition: A guide for the perplexed; Richard Bernabe
- The Great Smoky Mountains: Behind The Lens, Second Edition; Richard Bernabe
- Time Passages: Long Exposure Photography Strategies and Techniques; Richard Bernabe
