= Richard Chung =

American monk and priest who committed suicide

Richard Chung, O.S.B. (1951 - March 20, 1992), was an American Benedictine monk, priest and schoolteacher, best known for his suicide after the launching of a police investigation into Chung's possible sexual abuse of a boy at Catholic high school in Colorado Springs. Chung was further implicated in sexual misconduct in a 2004 civil lawsuit against the Roman Catholic Diocese of Pueblo and the Benedictine Order by a man claiming to have been abused by Chung at a Benedictine-run boarding school in Cañon City, Colorado during 1982.

== Biography ==
Born in 1951, Chung became a monk of the Order of St. Benedict at Holy Cross Abbey, in Cañon City, Colorado. He worked as a teacher at a boarding school run by the abbey. He was later appointed chairman of the religious education department at St Mary's High School in Colorado Springs in 1988.

Chung was found dead on March 20, 1992. The suicide took place during a police investigation into a possible molestation of a boy at St. Mary's High School. A police officer interviewed by the Colorado Springs Gazette-Telegraph was quoted as asserting the presence of a "'probable cause on inappropriate touching'" for a criminal charge of "'sexual assault on a child by one in a position of trust.'"

Posthumous articles published by the Denver Post recalled Chung as a popular St. Mary's High School priest whose Cañon City mass was attended by more than 600 mourners. The smaller Colorado Springs Gazette-Telegraph reported that Chung was renowned for his amiable personal qualities and that the St. Mary's community was "hit hard." The corpse was buried on Holy Cross Abbey property on March 25, 1992.

Further molestation controversy surfaced over a decade later. A civil lawsuit was filed against the diocese and the abbey in 2004 by a California man who, claiming a conscious recovery of his repressed memories, alleged that Chung had sexually molested him during his education as a 14-year-old schoolboy at Holy Cross Abbey in 1982.
