= Richard Bovet =

- Occupation: Writer
- Known for: Pandaemonium (1684)

Richard Bovet (born c. 1641) was an English author who wrote Pandaemonium, or the Devil's Cloister (1684), a book on demonology.

Bovet was virulently anti-Catholic, and his book often equates Catholicism with witchcraft. His work was influenced by that of Joseph Glanvill and Henry More.
