= Richard Gurnon =

- Born: Everett, Massachusetts
- Allegiance: United States
- Branch: United States Navy
- Service years: 1970–1978
- Other work: President of Massachusetts Maritime Academy, 2005-2015

Rear Admiral Richard Gurnon is a retired college administrator who served as president of Massachusetts Maritime Academy from 2005 to 2015.

== Career ==
A 1970 graduate of the United States Naval Academy, Gurnon served in the United States Navy from 1970 to 1978 as a naval aviator before leaving military service. At that time, he took a position at Massachusetts Maritime Academy as a company officer. Over the years he assumed positions of greater responsibility. In 2004 he served as acting president during the illness of president Rear Admiral Maurice Bresnahan.

== Tenure as president ==
After Bresnahan's death, Gurnon was appointed president of the academy in 2005, a position that carries the title rear admiral in the United States Maritime Service. Over the course of his ten years as president, Gurnon led efforts to revitalize the academy. These efforts led to many new buildings on campus, expanded degree offerings, and a doubling of student enrollment.

Early in his tenure, however, Gurnon faced criticism from the academy's board of trustees in the midst of a school and police investigation into a student sex scandal. In December 2005, the trustees voted to remove Gurnon as president. The Massachusetts Board of Higher Education criticized the move, and later that month the trustees voted to restore Gurnon. In the aftermath, most of the trustees were replaced.

In 2009, Gurnon was interviewed frequently by media outlets after the Maersk Alabama hijacking by Somali pirates since the ship's captain and chief mate were both academy graduates. Gurnon told interviewers he expected a rise in applicants to the academy following the dramatic events. According to the Los Angeles Times Gurnon pointed out that the academy teaches its students about how to deter and react to pirate attacks.

== Retirement ==
On August 12, 2015, Gurnon retired as President after over ten years as President at Massachusetts Maritime Academy where he was relieved by Rear Admiral Francis X. McDonald, USMS at a formal change of command ceremony presided by Chip Jaenikin, U.S. Maritime Administrator.
