= Richard Radl =

American politician

Member of the Iowa House of Representatives from the 43rd district
- In office January 11, 1971 – January 7, 1973
- Preceded by: Walter Dietz
- Succeeded by: Sonja Egenes

Member of the Iowa House of Representatives from the 48th district
- In office January 11, 1965 – January 10, 1971
- Preceded by: John Ely
- Succeeded by: Harold C. McCormick

Personal details
- Born: August 27, 1911 Chicago, Illinois
- Died: February 24, 1977 (aged 65)
- Party: Democratic

Richard Radl (August 27, 1911 – February 24, 1977) was an American politician who served in the Iowa House of Representatives from 1965 to 1973.
