= Richard A. Rachubinski =

Canadian cell biologist and academic

- Born: Canada
- Occupations: Molecular cell biologist, Cell biologist and academic
- Title: Professor, University of Alberta
- Awards: Fellow of the Royal Society of Canada (2002) Fellow of the American Association for the Advancement of Science (2014); HHMI International Research Scholar; Canada Research Chair in Cell Biology Fellow of the Canadian Academy of Health Sciences

Academic background
- Education: M.S Anatomy; Ph.D. Anatomy
- Alma mater: McGill University

Academic work
- Institutions: University of Alberta; McMaster University

Richard A. Rachubinski is a Canadian cell biologist and academic. He serves as a Professor at the University of Alberta in the Department of Cell Biology.

Rachubinski's research centers on understanding how peroxisomes—essential organelles involved in lipid metabolism, redox balance, and cellular detoxification—are assembled, maintained, and inherited during cell division. Using model organisms such as Yarrowia lipolytica, Saccharomyces cerevisiae, and Drosophila melanogaster, his lab has uncovered fundamental genetic and molecular pathways that govern peroxisome biogenesis and inheritance.

A major focus of Rachubinski's work has been elucidating the mechanisms of peroxisomal protein targeting and import. He was among the first to demonstrate that peroxisomes can import fully folded, and even oligomeric, protein complexes—including dimers like thiolase—challenging the prevailing dogma that proteins must unfold to cross organellar membranes. These findings fundamentally reshaped the understanding of protein trafficking and organelle biology.

In addition to defining peroxisomal biogenesis and function, Rachubinski has advanced understanding of the cross-talk between peroxisomes and other organelles—including the endoplasmic reticulum and mitochondria—shedding light on how organelles coordinate lipid metabolism, redox balance, and organelle dynamics within the cellular network. His work has also elucidated how peroxisomes respond dynamically to physiological cues, including transcriptional regulation and metabolic conditions that induce peroxisome proliferation, offering insights into how cells adapt organelle abundance and function to environmental and cellular demands.

He has played a leading role in the discovery and functional characterization of peroxins (PEX proteins), which are required for peroxisome assembly and matrix protein import. This research has had important translational implications: by defining the genetic and biochemical basis of peroxisome biogenesis disorders (PBDs), his work has contributed to better diagnosis and mechanistic understanding of these rare but severe pediatric diseases. More recently, his lab has explored how peroxisomes influence innate immune signaling pathways and inflammatory responses, broadening the scope of peroxisome biology to include immunometabolism and host-pathogen interactions.

Beyond his research, Rachubinski has served as Chair of the Department of Cell Biology at the University of Alberta for over two decades. His contributions to science and education have been recognized with numerous awards, including being named an International Research Scholar of the Howard Hughes Medical Institute (HHMI), fellowship in the Royal Society of Canada, the Canadian Academy of Health Sciences and the American Association for the Advancement of Science, and the recipient of the Canadian Society for Molecular Biosciences Senior Investigator Award.

== Selected articles ==
- Glover, JR, Andrews, DW, & Rachubinski, RA (1994). Saccharomyces cerevisiae peroxisomal thiolase is imported as a dimer. Proceedings of the National Academy of Sciences, 91(22), 10541–10545.
- Fagarasanu, M, Fagarasanu, A, Tam, YYC, Aitchison, JD, & Rachubinski, RA (2005). Inp1p is a peroxisomal membrane protein required for peroxisome inheritance in Saccharomyces cerevisiae. The Journal of Cell Biology, 169(5), 765–775.
- Fagarasanu, A, Fagarasanu, M, & Rachubinski, RA (2007). Maintaining peroxisome populations: A story of division and inheritance. Annual Review of Cell and Developmental Biology, 23, 321–344.
- Nath AS, Parsons BD, Makdissi S, Chilvers RL, Mu Y, Weaver CM, Euodia I, Fitze KA, Long J, Scur M, Mackenzie DP, Makrigiannis AP, Pichaud N, Boudreau LH, Simmonds AJ, Webber CA, Derfalvi B, Hammon Y, Rachubinski RA, Di Cara F. (2022). Modulation of the cell membrane lipid milieu by peroxisomal β-oxidation induces Rho1 signaling to trigger inflammatory responses. Cell Reports, 38(9), 110355.
- Di Cara, F, Bülow, MH, Simmonds, AJ, & Rachubinski, RA (2018). Dysfunctional peroxisomes compromise gut structure and host defense by increased cell death and Tor-dependent autophagy. Molecular Biology of the Cell, 29(22), 2766–2783.
- Di Cara, F, Savary, S, Kovacs, WJ, Kim, P, Rachubinski, RA (2023). The peroxisome: an up-and-coming organelle in immunometabolism. Trends in Immunology, 44(4), 290–302.
- Eitzen, GA, Szilard, RK, & Rachubinski, RA (1997). Enlarged peroxisomes are present in oleic acid-grown Yarrowia lipolytica overexpressing the PEX16 gene encoding an intraperoxisomal peripheral membrane peroxin. Journal of Cell Biology, 137(6), 1265–1278.
- Mast, FD, Li, J, Virk, MK, Hughes, SC, Simmonds, AJ, Rachubinski RA (2011). A Drosophila model for the Zellweger spectrum of peroxisome biogenesis disorders. Dis Model Mech, (5):659-72.
- Tam YYC, Rachubinski, RA (2002). Yarrowia lipolytica cells mutant for the PEX24 gene encoding a peroxisomal membrane peroxin mislocalize peroxisomal proteins and accumulate membrane structures containing both peroxisomal matrix and membrane proteins. Mol Biol Cell,(8):2681-91.
- Mast FD, Rachubinski, RA, Aitchison, JD (2016). Signaling dynamics and peroxisomes. Curr Opin Cell Biol., (35):131-136.
- Rachubinski RA, Verma DP, Bergeron JJ (1980). Synthesis of rat liver microsomal cytochrome b5 by free ribosomes. J. Cell Biol., (3):705-716
