= Richard Burton (journalist) =

British journalist

Richard Burton is a visiting lecturer at the University of Westminster and former managing editor of The Jewish Chronicle. He has been editor of the websites of the British newspapers The Daily Telegraph and The Sunday Telegraph.

He was a Fleet Street journalist for 20 years, working for Today, the Sunday Mirror, and The Daily Telegraph.
