= Richard S. Crossin =

Ornithologist and collector

Richard S. Crossin (1933–2003) was a collector and ornithologist. He was born in 1933 and started collecting specimens in 1959, continuing to collect until around 1973, according to the Western Foundation of Vertebrate Zoology's "Field Notes of Richard Crossin" and online database. The Western Foundation of Vertebrate Zoology houses about 195 egg and nest sets collected by or for Crossin from Kenya, Tanzania, Uganda, Somalia, Mexico, Florida and Arizona. Crossin owned a private museum in Tucson, Arizona. His personal foundation was called the Neotropical Ornithological Foundation, which held 2,266 egg sets from additional states in North America and additional countries such as Argentina, Bolivia, Central and Southern Pacific Ocean, Australia, and Europe. Crossin died in 2003.
