= Rihards =

Male given name

Rihards is a masculine Latvian given name and may refer to:

- Rihards Bukarts (born 1995), Latvian ice hockey player
- Rihards Dubra (born 1964), Latvian composer
- Rihards Kotāns (1956–2010), Latvian bobsledder
- Rihards Kozlovskis (born 1969), Latvian politician and lawyer
- Rihards Kuksiks (born 1988), Latvian basketball player
- Rihards Lomažs (born 1996), Latvian basketball player
- Rihards Marenis (born 1993), Latvian ice hockey player
- Rihards Pīks (born 1941), Latvian politician
- Rihards Veide (born 1991), Latvian BMX racer
- Rihards Zariņš (1869–1939), Latvian graphic artist
