= Richard Wilkins =

Richard Wilkins or Rick Wilkins may refer to:

- Richard Wilkins (TV presenter) (born 1954), Australian TV presenter
- Richard Wilkins (law) (1952–2012), assistant solicitor general in the US during the 1980s and advocate of international recognition of the family
- Richard Wilkins (footballer) (born 1965), English footballer and manager
- Rick Wilkins (musician) (born 1937), Canadian composer, conductor, and jazz musician
- Rick Wilkins (baseball) (born 1967), American baseball player
- Dick Wilkins (Richard Maurice Wilkins), American football player
- Richard Wilkins (Buffy the Vampire Slayer), fictional mayor of Sunnydale in the TV series Buffy the Vampire Slayer
