= Richard the Stork =

- German theatrical release poster
- Überflieger — Kleine Vögel, großes Geklapper
- Directed by: Toby Genkel; Reza Memari
- Written by: Reza Memari
- Produced by: Kristine Knudsen; Emely Christians
- Starring: Cooper Kramer
- Edited by: Reza Memari
- Music by: Éric Neveux
- Production companies: Den Siste Skilling; Knudsen & Streuber Medienmanufaktur; Mélusine Productions; Ulysses Filmproduktion; Walking The Dog
- Distributed by: Wild Bunch (Germany); Global Screen (International)
- Release dates: February 12, 2017 (BIFF); May 5, 2017 (Norway); May 11, 2017 (Germany)
- Running time: 85 minutes
- Countries: Luxembourg; Belgium; Germany; Norway
- Languages: German; English
- Box office: $13.9 million

Richard the Stork (Released in North America as A Stork's Journey, German: Überflieger — Kleine Vögel, großes Geklapper and also known as Little Bird's Big Adventure) is a 2017 animated adventure film. It was directed by Toby Genkel and Reza Memari. Richard the Stork premiered at the Berlin International Film Festival in Germany on February 12, 2017. It was released for a short time on Google Play on June 1, 2017. The film was later released in theaters in the United States on June 30, 2017.

A sequel, Richard the Stork and the Mystery of the Great Jewel was released in April 2023.

== Plot ==
A baby Sparrow is orphaned after his parents are killed by a Weasel, and is adopted by a family of Storks who raise him as one of their own, and name him Richard. As the flock's annual winter migration nears, Claudius, Richard's father and the leader of the flock, informs him that, as a sparrow, he is unable to migrate with them, despite the protests of Richard's brother, Max, and his mother, Aurora. When the flock leaves for Africa the following morning, Richard attempts to follow but is knocked unconscious by a storm. He then meets Olga, a quirky, oversized, but good-hearted Pygmy Owl, who often talks to her imaginary friend Oleg, and decides to stay with her, after she saves him from a group of Bats.

The duo learn from a group of internet obsessed Pigeons that the stork flock is headed to Gibraltar, and decide to head there themselves. They encounter Kiki, a manipulative, disco-loving Budgie being forced to perform in a karaoke bar, who claims to know where Gibraltar is and how to get there, and Olga and Richard help free him from his cage. They then board a train which Kiki says is headed to Gibraltar (though it is really headed to the city of Sanremo, Italy). During the ride, Olga opens up about her past and explains that, like Richard, she is also a misfit. Due to her large size, Olga was constantly bullied by her siblings, and then abandoned by her own family, until she eventually “met” Oleg, who became her very first friend. Richard comforts her, and they fall asleep.

The next morning, Kiki abandons the duo and heads to the Sanremo Music Festival for birds, but is denied the chance to perform and is crushed to see another parakeet performing his song. After learning from a group of Godfather-like Crows that they're actually in Italy, Richard and Olga discover Kiki's deception, and the pair have a falling-out after Olga firmly tells Richard that he isn't a stork, and Richard tells her that Oleg isn't real. Richard then vows to fly across the sea to make it to Gibraltar.

Kiki meets up with Olga, who, although still angry over having been tricked, agrees to help stop Richard from attempting to make the dangerous flight. As Richard is about to dive off a cliff, Kiki and Olga arrive and try to persuade him not to jump but are unsuccessful, and jump down after Richard. They narrowly avoid falling into the sea below when they join wings and glide in the air together. However, they are nearly killed in an encounter with a jumbo jet, and fall into the swimming pool of an ocean liner, where Olga is knocked unconscious. However, Kiki helps save her by performing CPR.

The storks arrive in Africa, but discover that the watering hole has dried up. After an argument with his father, Max wanders off, and ends up falling into the cave of a honey badger. When the trio arrives in Africa, they learn of the situation from a pigeon couple. After entering the cave, they are able to fend off the honey badger long enough to get Max to safety. Richard is able to collapse the cave, which kills the honey badger but seemingly buries him as well. His friends and the storks initially begin mourning, but when Richard reveals that he is still alive, the storks are able to dig him out. Aurora and Max are overjoyed, and Claudius apologizes to Richard for not believing in him, and he is finally accepted into the flock, along with his new friends.

== Cast ==
- Cooper Kramer (original dub) and Drake Bell (Lionsgate dub) as Richard, an orphan tween house sparrow raised by storks and main protagonist,
- Shannon Conley (original dub) and Jane Lynch (Lionsgate dub) as Olga, a pygmy owl that was disliked by her family because of her large size and has an imaginary friend named Oleg.
- Marc Thompson as Kiki, a budgerigar who lives in a karaoke bar
- Erica Schroeder as Aurora, a female white stork, the adoptive mother of Richard.
- Jonathan Todd Ross as Claudius, a male white stork, Max's father
- Jason Griffith as Max, a young white stork, Claudius's son and Richard's brother
- Michele Knotz (original dub) and Justine Ezarik (Lionsgate dub) as Social Media Pigeons

== Production ==
Studio Rakete in Hamburg, Germany and Studio 352 in Luxembourg created the storyboard. Studio Rakete was also responsible for the design of the main characters; Studio 352 designed the supporting characters. Most of the character animation was done by Bug AS in Norway. Lighting/shading, FX simulations and compositing of the final pictures was done by Walking the Dog from Belgium and Rise FX in Berlin. The movie was animated and rendered using Houdini with over 500 shots to be finished.
