= Richard Wojciak =

British ice hockey player

- Born: 5 May 1982 (age 44) Swindon, England
- Height: 5 ft 10 in (178 cm)
- Position: Forward
- Played for: Swindon Wildcats
- Playing career: 1982–2008

Richard Wojciak (born 5 May 1982) is a British ice hockey forward. Previously with the Nottingham Panthers and the Solihull Barons.

Richard has now moved on to play for Isle of Wight Raiders (number 20).

Richard Wojciak started his career at Swindon where he played with Gareth Endicott and Andrew Shurmer. Wojciak, who stands at 5'10, has been described as a fast skillful player and he will play in his preferred position of defence for the Raiders. He is also a former Great Britain junior international.

Head coach Les Millie is delighted to have Richard on board. "Most people will associate Richard as being a forward but they couldn't be further from the truth, Richard is a natural defenceman and has had to adapt for other teams as they played him up front, he was eager to get back on the blue line and from the comments I've had from coaches and players he will be one of the best British Dmen in the league. Mike Ellis of the Nottingham Panthers also talks highly of Richard and was one of the contacts i spoke at length about with this signing."
