= Richard Price-Williams =

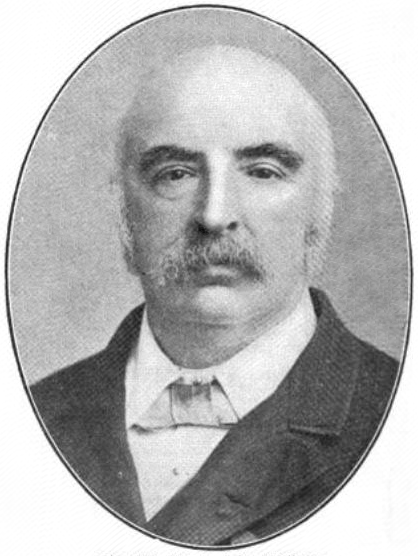
- Born: 22 November 1827; London, England
- Died: 16 September 1916 (aged 88); Bournemouth, England
- Occupation: Civil engineer

Richard Price-Williams (1827–1916) was a British engineer.

== Biography ==
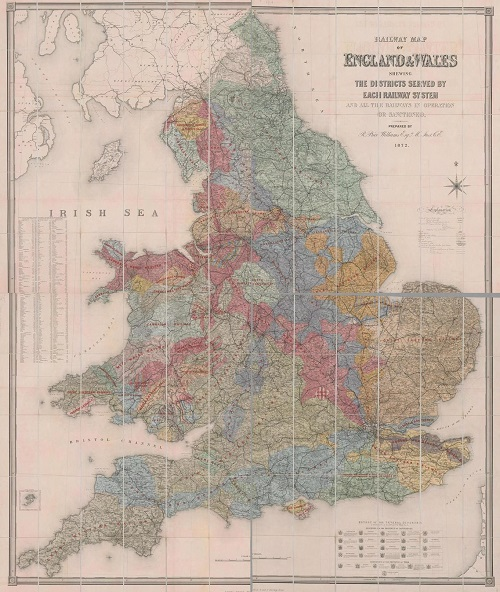
Richard Price-Williams' Railway Map of England & Wales (1872)

Richard Price-Williams was born in London on 22 November 1827. He served a pupillage under George Heald, who was Thomas Brassey's engineer on the construction of the Lancaster & Carlisle, and Caledonian Railways in 1845–1846. He afterwards served as an apprentice in the locomotive works of Kitson, Thompson and Hewitson at Leeds, being engaged later on, from 1854 to 1860, in designing and preparing plans of girder bridges, and carrying out other works while resident engineer at Leeds on the Great Northern Railway. Subsequently, he acted as consulting engineer for the proposed Metropolitan Outer Circle Railway, and in the preparation of plans and estimates for a number of other railways, both at home and in the Colonies.

He was appointed by the Royal Commission on Coal Supplies in 1866 and subsequent years and in 1868 he was appointed Chief Engineer for the Royal Commission on Irish Railways. He also acted for most of the principal railway companies in the United Kingdom to prepare and advocate their claims against the Government for the purchase of the telegraphs in 1871.

In 1872 his Railway Map of England & Wales was published by Edward Stanford of Charing Cross, London.

In 1889 he reported upon the condition of the railways in New South Wales and Tasmania, and afterwards acted as arbitrator on behalf of the Tasmanian Main Line Railway Co. for the disposal of the railway to the Tasmanian Government, being subsequently appointed Consulting Engineer by the Governor.

He became a Member of the Institution of Civil Engineers in 1861, and was awarded the Telford, Watt, and Stephenson gold medals. The Iron and Steel Institute awarded him the Bessemer gold medal in 1898 on the recommendation of Sir Henry Bessemer.

He died at Bournemouth on 19 September 1916.
