= Richard Holder =

Richard Holder (born March 17, 1974) is a Belizean visual artist and commercial photographer.

== About Richard Holder ==
Richard Holder is the grandson of award-winning local Kriol calypsonian Cleveland Berry and the son of Dr. Marla Berry-Holder, Ph.D., who was an active philanthropist and pioneer leader in Belize's citrus industry. Holder spent his early childhood in Trinidad and Tobago while his mother studied at the University of West Indies. He later grew up in the idyllic agricultural communities of Central Farm and Esperanza in the Cayo District of Western Belize.

At the age of seventeen, Holder undertook intensive study in the United States before returning to his homeland in 1999. During his early photography rendezvous, Holder soon realized that the camera was a way to create art faster than with a pen or a paintbrush, and an exciting means to explore light and color. Holder learned his craft at the University of North Texas (UNT) on the outskirts of Dallas. He graduated in 1997 with a BA in Photography and minor in English and Illustration. With a unique foundation as a fine art painter and a cartoonist that budded as a child, Holder immediately created a name for himself among his photography counterparts in Belize "alternately shocking and entertaining" his audience.

In 1999, upon his return to Belize, Holder's artistic nude photography of women was published in the Spanish edition of Penthouse. The following year, those images were featured in Holder's first solo exhibition titled, "Nude". His signature uninhibited style kept developing and ventured beyond the aesthetics of the female form. In subsequent solo exhibitions such as the controversial “WE” ( 1993 ), Holder produced large format light box images of homeless people taken in his studio. In 2009, The Image Factory Art Foundation and Gallery celebrated ten years of his fine art photography in Belize with a retrospective titled, "Decadence 1999–2009".

Commercially, Holder has established himself as a people photographer with subjects ranging from the happy couple enjoying a honeymoon in the tropics to the Prime Minister of Belize at his executive desk. Holder has become the premier photographer for the annual Belikin Beer Calendar produced by the country's only local and largest beer distributor. In 2010, he served as the Director of Photography for the national beauty pageant, The Next Miss Belize.

=== R H Photo Limited ===
Richard Holder is the owner of R H Photo Ltd. – a modern photography company founded in 2004. The company started in 2000 as www.richardholder.com, which now showcases Holder's artistic creations and snippets of his local and international exhibitions. R H Photo Ltd. opened its first professional studio in the heart of downtown Belize City, a place that has served as inspiration for some of Holder's greatest street projects. In 2010, the company relocated to the outskirts of Belize City on the Northern Highway.
