= Richard Coke Marshall Jr. =

United States Army general

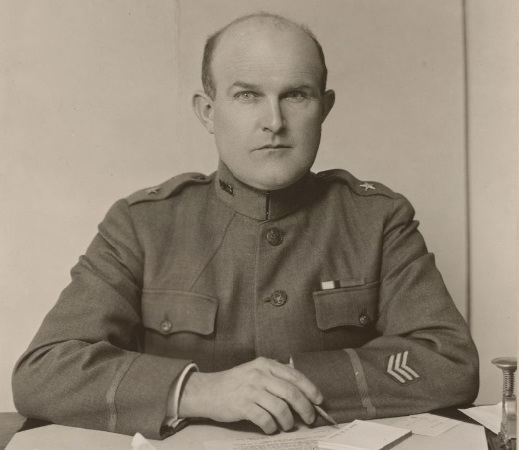
- Marshall at the U.S. Army War College in 1919. National Archives and Records Administration.
- Born: March 13, 1879; Portsmouth, Virginia, US
- Died: March 12, 1961 (aged 81); Washington, D.C., US
- Burial place: Saint Johns Church Cemetery, Hampton, Virginia, US
- Spouse: Marie Louise Booker (m. 1903-1958, her death)
- Children: 1
- Military career
- Allegiance: United States
- Branch: United States Army
- Service years: 1898–1920 (Army) 1921–1930 (Reserve)
- Rank: Brigadier General
- Conflicts: Spanish–American War; First World War
- Other work: Engineer

Richard Coke Marshall Jr. (March 13, 1879 – March 12, 1961) served as an American brigadier general during World War I.

== Early life ==
Richard Coke Marshall Jr. was born on March 13, 1879, in Portsmouth, Virginia, to Richard Marshall and Kate Wilson Coke Marshall.

He attended the Virginia Military Institute, graduating in 1898.

== Military career ==
Marshall accepted a commission as a captain with the Fourth United States Volunteer Infantry on June 29, 1898, and served in the Spanish American War.

Marshall resigned from the Regular Army in 1920. He was appointed as a brigadier general in the Reserve Corps in 1921. Marshall commanded the Reserve's 219th Field Artillery brigade from 1926 until 1930.

== Civilian career ==
In 1920, Marshall accepted a position as general manager of the Association of General Contractors of America. In 1928, he became president of the Sumner Sollitt Company in Chicago.

== Awards ==
Marshall received the Army Distinguished Service Medal for his World War I service with the Construction Division. The citation for the medal reads:

The President of the United States of America, authorized by Act of Congress, July 9, 1918, takes pleasure in presenting the Army Distinguished Service Medal to Brigadier General Richard C. Marshall, Jr., United States Army, for exceptionally meritorious and distinguished services to the Government of the United States, in a duty of great responsibility during World War I. In the Construction Division of the Army, General Marshall's zeal, judgment, and exceptional administrative ability have enabled serious difficulties to be overcome and the construction necessary for a great army to be provided.

== Personal life ==
He had a son, Richard C. Marshall III.

== Death and legacy ==
Marshall died in Washington, D.C., on March 12, 1961.
