= Richard J. Estes =

American academic (1942–2026)

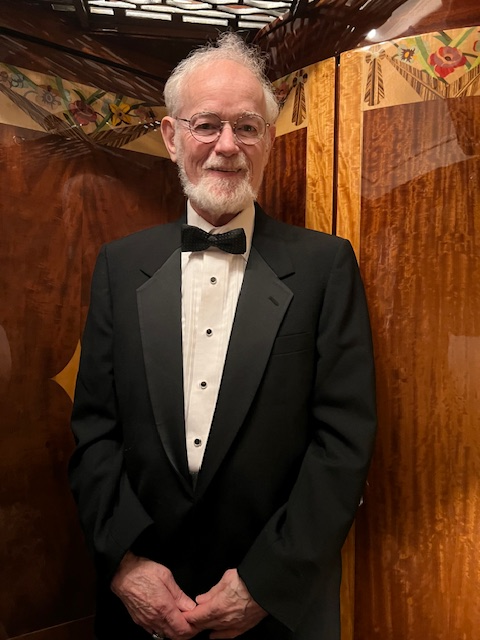
- Born: Richard James Thomas Estes; Philadelphia, Pennsylvania, U.S.
- Died: July 17, 2026 (aged 84)
- Occupations: Research social worker, consultant, author, academic

Academic background
- Education: AB, La Salle University; MSW, University of Pennsylvania; PSW; DSW, University of California, Berkeley

Academic work
- Institutions: University of Pennsylvania

Richard James Thomas Estes was an American research social worker, consultant, author and academic, who was professor emeritus of Social Work and Social Policy at the University of Pennsylvania in Philadelphia. His research spanned international social work and comparative social welfare, national and international social development, quality of life and well-being studies, and socio-economic-political development patterns in Islamic nations, as well as factors contributing to Islamic militancy and terrorism.

Estes authored journal articles and books, including The Social Progress of Nations, Trends in World Social Development, and The Pursuit of Human Wellbeing. He received awards, including two Fulbright-Hays Senior Research Awards (1978, 1979), a Distinguished Fulbright Scholar Award to Yonsei University in Seoul (1994), the Alumni Recognition Award from the University of Pennsylvania School of Social Work (1996), the Best Article in Social Indicators Research Award from the International Society for Quality of Life Studies (ISQOLS) (1996), the Council on Social Work Education (CSWE)'s Distinguished Recent Contributions to Social Work Education Award (1997), the International Rhoda G. Sarnat Award from the National Association of Social Workers (1997), the Global Commission of the CSWE's Partner in International Education Award (2005), and the ISQOLS Distinguished Quality of Life Research Award (2009).

He was elected Social Worker of the Year by the Pennsylvania Chapter of the National Association of Social Workers in 1992 and was inducted into the American Academy of Social Work and Social Welfare (AASWSW) in 2013. That same year, the International Society for Quality of Life Studies established a permanently endowed lecture series in his name on international and comparative studies in quality-of-life research. The University of Pennsylvania also established the annual Richard J. Estes Global Citizenship Award.

== Early life and education ==
Richard James Thomas Estes was born in Philadelphia, Pennsylvania on June 20, 1942. He earned an AB from La Salle University, followed by a Master of Social Work degree from the University of Pennsylvania and a Doctor of Social Welfare degree from the University of California, Berkeley. He received a post-master's Certificate in Psychiatric Social Work from the Menninger Foundation in Topeka, Kansas in 1968.

== Career ==
Estes began his academic career at the University of Pennsylvania in 1973 and held the title of professor emeritus of Social Work and Social Policy from 2010 until his death in 2026. He acted as chair of the graduate concentration in Social and Economic Development (SED) and directed the School's international programs until his retirement.

He was the founding President of the Philadelphia Area Chapter of the Society for International Development (SID) and held leadership roles, including serving as President of the Group for the Advancement of Doctoral Education (GADE) and as Chair of the Council on External Relations for the Global Commission of the Council on Social Work Education (CSWE). In 2004, he was elected president of ISQOLS, an international organization of research scholars focused on quality of life and wellbeing studies.

== Works ==
Estes's work centered on the use of social indicators, social reporting, and statistical model building in guiding the understanding of the factors that both advance and inhibit global development. In later years of his career, his research work focused on factors that contribute to Islamic militancy and terrorism. He emphasized the importance of social work education in his 1992 book, Internationalizing Social Work Education: A Guide to Resources for A New Century, which was described as "extremely helpful" by Charles Guzzetta.

Looking into the development patterns of societies across the globe, Estes authored The Social Progress of Nations in 1984, and followed it with The Social Progress of Nations Revisited: Fifty Years of Promise and Progress in 2019, both of which examined global social progress, analyzing quality-of-life trends and social indicators across different populations and regions. Prior to this, his 1988 work, Trends in World Social Development: The Social Progress of Nations, 1970-1987 studied global social development trends and the widening gap between rich and poor nations. Brij Mohan remarked, "Trends in World Social Development will positively serve as the forerunner of studies that will enrich social development as one of the most crucial intellectual activities of the 21st Century."

In 1992, Estes contributed to Towards a Social Development Strategy for the ESCAP Region, investigating regional social conditions, policy options, and development scenarios for 42 countries of the United Nations Asia-Pacific region focusing on poverty eradication, the promotion of social justice, and the centrality of civic engagement in advancing the social progress of nations and major world regions. Later, he utilized his own Social Development Index to assess Hong Kong's social progress, analyzing key sectors related to the well-being of vulnerable populations in Social Development in Hong Kong: The Unfinished Agenda (2005). In 2007, he continued to observe the environmental and humanitarian crises of the late 20th century, exploring climate change, resource depletion, and the rise of regional conflicts in Advancing Quality of Life in a Turbulent World. His 2017 book, The Pursuit of Wellbeing: The Untold Global History, co-edited alongside M. Joseph Sirgy, explored similar themes and was regarded as a "superb resource for anyone wanting a comprehensive global overview of philosophies, concepts, and socio-economic and political histories relating to wellbeing" by Neil Thin and colleagues.

Expanding his research on social well-being, Estes used his Weighted Index of Social Progress and assessed issues affecting over 170 nations with a special emphasis on the most vulnerable groups in each of these nations. In 2005, he co-edited Medical, Legal and Social Science Aspects of Child Sexual Exploitation: A Comprehensive Review of Child Pornography, Child Prostitution, and Internet Crimes Against Children, a three-volume set, with Sharon W. Cooper, Angelo P. Giardino, and Victor Vieth, about which Martin R. Wilson stated, "the collection makes a significant contribution to this area of protecting children." They subsequently published an abridged version, Child Sexual Exploitation Quick Reference: For Health Care, Social Service, and Law Enforcement Professionals, in 2007.

Another facet of Estes' research encompassed the social progress of Islamic societies. With Habib Tiliouine, he co-edited The State of Social Progress of Islamic Societies: Social, Economic, Political, and Ideological Challenges in 2016, investigating social progress in the Islamic world, and comparing development trends and challenges while evaluating strategies for improvement. Furthermore, he studied the relationship between Islamic-inspired terrorism and factors such as colonization history, political systems, civil liberties, corruption, and social development in 27 member states of the Organization of Islamic Cooperation (OIC) and proposed an agenda to improve the quality of life in Islamic societies and advance cooperation between Islamic and Western societies.

== Death ==
Estes died on July 17, 2026, at the age of 84.

== Awards and honors ==
- 1978 – Senior Fulbright Scholar Award to Iran, Fulbright Association
- 1979 – Senior Fulbright Scholar Award to Norway, Fulbright Association
- 1994 – Distinguished Fulbright Scholar Award to South Korea, Fulbright Association
- 1996 – Alumni Recognition Award, University of Pennsylvania School of Social Work
- 1996 – Best Article in Social Indicators Research Award, International Society of Quality of Life Studies (ISQOLS)
- 1997 – Distinguished Recent Contributions to Social Work Education Award, Council on Social Work Education (CSWE)
- 1997 – International Rhoda G. Sarnat Award, National Association of Social Workers
- 2005 – Partner in International Education Award, CSWE Global Commission
- 2009 – Distinguished Quality of Life Research Award, ISQOLS
- 2010 – Establishment of the “Richard J. Estes Global Citizenship Award”, University of Pennsylvania
- 2012 – University Distinguished Professor, Chinese University of Hong Kong
- 2013 – Fellow, American Academy of Social Work and Social Welfare (AASWSW)

== Bibliography ==
=== Selected books ===
- The Social Progress of Nations (1984) ISBN 978-0-03-059582-0
- Trends in World Social Development: The Social Progress of Nations, 1970-1987 (1988) ISBN 978-0-275-92613-7
- Medical, Legal & Social Science Aspects of Child Sexual Exploitation: A Comprehensive Review of Child Pornography, Child Prostitution, and Internet Crimes Against Children (2005) ISBN 978-1-878060-76-1
- Social Development in Hong Kong: The Unfinished Agenda (2005) ISBN 978-0-19-592745-0
- Advancing Quality of Life in a Turbulent World (2007) ISBN 978-1-4020-5099-2
- Child Sexual Exploitation Quick Reference: For Health Care, Social Service, and Law Enforcement Professionals (2007) ISBN 978-1-878060-21-1
- The State of Social Progress of Islamic Societies: Social, Economic, Political, and Ideological Challenges (2016) ISBN 978-3-319-24772-4
- The Pursuit of Wellbeing: The Untold Global History (2017) ISBN 978-3-319-39100-7
- The Social Progress of Nations Revisited: Fifty Years of Promise and Progress (2019) ISBN 978-3-030-15909-2

=== Selected articles ===
- Estes, R. J. (1997). Social development trends in Europe, 1970–1994: Development prospects for the new Europe. Social Indicators Research, 42, 1–19.
- Estes, R. J., & Wilensky, H. L. (1978). Life cycle squeeze and the morale curve. Social Problems, 25(3), 277–292.
- Estes, R. J. (1998). Trends in World Social Development, 1970–1995: Development Challenges for a New Century. In Globalization and the Evolving World Society (pp. 11–39). Brill.
- Estes, R. J. (2010). Toward sustainable development: From theory to praxis. In Transnational social work practice (pp. 76–108). Columbia University Press.
- Estes, R. J. (2010). The world social situation: Development challenges at the outset of a new century. Social Indicators Research, 98, 363–402.
- Estes, R. J. (2024). United Nations Yearbooks, Statistical Collections, and Databases. In Encyclopedia of Quality of Life and Well-Being Research (pp. 7376–7390). Cham: Springer International Publishing.
