= Richard Piñanez =

Paraguayan footballer (born 1991)

Personal information
- Full name: Richard David Piñanez
- Date of birth: 29 August 1991 (age 35)
- Place of birth: Ciudad del Este, Paraguay
- Height: 1.81 m (5 ft 11 in)
- Position: Forward

Youth career
- Olimpia

Senior career*
Years	Team	Apps	(Gls)
2010–2011	Independiente FBC		
2012–2013	Ñublense	6	(0)
2014	Paranaense		
2014	Deportes Puerto Montt	5	(1)
2015–2016	3 de Febrero		
2016	Naval	6	(0)
- * Club domestic league appearances and goals

Richard David Piñanez (born 29 August 1991) is a former Paraguayan footballer who played as a forward.

== Career ==
A product of Olimpia, Piñanez played for Independiente FBC, Paranaense and 3 de Febrero in his homeland.

Abroad, he played for Ñublense, Deportes Puerto Montt and Naval.
