= Richard W. Kent =

American businessman

- Occupations: Businessman, Baseball team proprietor
- Known for: Owner of the St. Louis Giants (later St. Louis Stars); Director in the Negro National League

Richard W. Kent was an American businessman and baseball team proprietor based in St. Louis, Missouri. He owned the Calumet Cab Company and was reportedly involved in numbers running.

Together with Samuel Shepard and another business partner, Kent acquired the St. Louis Giants, building a stadium for the team. They later rebranded the team as the St. Louis Stars.

Kent also served as a director of the Negro National League (NNL), a key institution in African-American baseball history.

Silas E. Garner, a notable lawyer, provided legal services for the Calumet Cab Company.

== See also ==
- Calumet City
