= Richard Corneil =

Canadian academic administrator

Richard Corneil is a Canadian academic administrator.

== Career ==
He was the principal and chief administrator of Assumption University, a Roman Catholic institution in Windsor, Ontario, Canada from April 2015 to August 2019. He was formerly on staff at St. Peter's Seminary in London, Ontario, where he was the director of the Institute for Catholic Formation.
