= Richard Sewu =

Ghanaian association football player

Personal information
- Date of birth: 11 March 1996 (age 30)
- Place of birth: Ghana
- Height: 1.72 m (5 ft 8 in)
- Positions: Full-back; defensive midfielder

Team information
- Current team: Mbabane Swallows
- Number: 18

Youth career
- 2011–2014: Mighty Jets fc
- 2014–2015: Yeji Juventus

Senior career*
Years	Team	Apps	(Gls)
2016–2017	Sporting Saint Mirren F.C		
2017–	Mbabane Swallows		
- * Club domestic league appearances and goals

Richard Sewu (born 11 March 1996) is a Ghanaian footballer who plays for Mbabane Swallows

== Career ==
Sewu began his career in Ghana, playing for Mighty Jets FC and Yeji Juventus FC. In 2016, he joined Sporting Mirem.

In July 2017, he signed a one-year contract with Mbabane Swallows in Swaziland.
