= Richard Ahiagbah =

Ghanaian politician

Richard Ahiagbah is the Director of Communications for the New Patriotic Party in Ghana.

== Early life ==
Ahiagbah is a native of Aflao, a suburb of the Volta Region in Ghana. He is married and has a daughter.

== Education ==
Ahiagbah is an alumnus of the West London College, Illinois Central College, Illinois State University and the University of Illinois.

== Career ==
Richard Ahiagbah is currently the Director of Communications at the New Patriotic Party. He doubles as the deputy director of Research at the Office of the President. Ahiagbah began his professional career at the Fiscal Policy Centre and also as a Legislative Liaison for Oneok Hydrocarbons in the United States.

== Politics ==
=== USA ===
He worked as a field organizer for President Barack Obama's re-election campaign in 2012.

=== Ghana ===
Ahiagbah works as the Director of Communication for the New Patriotic Party in Ghana.
