= Richard A. Pauling =

Indian artist (1809 - 1881)

Richard Pauling (1809–1881, sometimes referred to as Paulding) was a portrait and landscape artist who was active in the United States, England and Canada in the mid-nineteenth century. His work is in the collections of Library and Archives Canada, the New York Historical Society, the Albany Institute of History and Art, and the Louisiana State Museum.

== Early years ==
Richard Alexander Pauling was born December 24, 1809, in Calcutta, Bengal, India, where his father, Richard, worked for the East India Company. His mother, Ann (nee Lennox), died in April 1813, and Richard was most likely sent to England to live with relatives shortly afterwards. His father remarried and had two other children, but he also died in Calcutta in 1822.

Name: Richard Alexander Pauling Gender: Male Marriage Date: 25 Sep 1831 Marriage Place: Holy Trinity, Newington, Surrey, England Spouse: Sally Ann Upton FHL Film Number: 307688 Marriage record to Jane Jefferson Simpkins states Richard was a 'Widower'...

== Move to the United States ==
A 25-year-old Richard Pauling appears on the passenger list of the ship Philadelphia, which departed from London and arrived in New York on October 23, 1833. By 1840, he was living in Albany, New York and working as an artist. Nothing is known about his artistic training, but his skill in miniatures was recognized at the Thirteenth Annual Fair of the American Institute in New York in 1840, where R.A. Pauling of Albany, New York was awarded the diploma "for the second best miniatures.

Shortly afterwards, Pauling moved to New York City and began exhibiting portraits and miniatures at the National Academy of Design. In 1841, while living at 5 Ann Street near St. Paul's Chapel on lower Broadway, he exhibited a Portrait of a Gentleman [Mr. Bassjord]. By 1842, Pauling had moved around the corner to 304 Broadway. He exhibited three works that year: Portrait of a Lady [Capt. Northrup, Portrait of a Lady [Paulding], and A Frame of Miniatures. The following year, he exhibited three more works: Portrait of a Lady [R. Hosfyns], Portrait of a Gentleman [W. Wade, and a Frame of 3 Miniatures.

Another early work from the early 1840s is a miniature (water colour on ivory) called "Le Grand [sic] Bancroft," dated circa 1843. Legrand Bancroft (1818–1880) was a prominent lawyer in Albany, and this portrait was acquired by the Albany Institute of History and Art in 1939.

== Return to England ==
On October 21, 1844, Pauling submitted a petition for naturalization to the Superior Court of New York County. Regardless of the outcome, which is not known, he decided to return to England shortly afterwards.

Pauling was in London by the end of 1844, as the records of the National Gallery indicate he was issued an artist's copyist ticket in 1844 to copy works in the Gallery. As Brian Foss writes, at the time, "art education tended to lay a heavy emphasis on copying as a means of improving one's technique and of gaining a deeper understanding of past masterpieces." Artists and students could apply to copy pictures in the National Gallery, the Louvre, and other major art museums. Pauling's ticket was issued on the recommendation of Mr. Charles Eastlake, Keeper of the National Gallery from 1843 to 1847, and later its first director. He was issued ticket #1410.

After spending a year in London, Pauling married Jane Jefferson Simpkins, the daughter of Thomas Jefferson Simpkins, on December 16, 1845, at St. Mary, Lambeth, in London. In the summer of 1847, their daughter Jane Elizabeth was born.

Pauling appears to have continued to practice as an artist while in London. An English work from that period is a small oval portrait miniature on ivory from 1847, picturing Eliza, the first wife of the late Edward Grove, which appeared at auction in Malvern, Worcestershire, in 2015.

== Return to New York ==
By 1851, Pauling had returned to New York with his wife and 3-year-old daughter and was exhibiting again at the National Academy of Design. In that year, he was living at 609 Broadway, and he showed a Portrait of a Gentleman [T.M. Butler]. Another work from about 1850 is a miniature watercolour on ivory of a young girl, now in the collection of the New York Historical Society.

For the 1853 National Academy exhibition, Pauling departed from portraiture by exhibiting a landscape. Entitled Canterbury Cathedral, it may have been done or based on drawings done during his time in England in the 1840s. However, his continuing speciality as a portrait painter was confirmed by entries in New York City directories during these years, when he was consistently identified as Richard A. Pauling, portrait painter.

== Cincinnati ==
Sometime after 1854, Pauling moved west to Cincinnati, Ohio. He is included in Artists in Ohio, 1787–1900: A Biographical Dictionary, which notes that in 1857 he was sharing an address with four other artists, William Southgate Porter and Charles W. Purcell, both daguerreotypists, Israel Quick, a photographist, and Philibert Beaugureau, an artist and drawing master from France.

Pauling's wife, Jane, died in 1855 shortly after they arrived in Cincinnati, leaving him a 46-year-old widower with their nine-year-old daughter, also named Jane. Within a couple of years, Pauling had married again, to Frances (Fanny) Willis of Cincinnati, ten years his junior. They had two more daughters, Frances (Fanny) born about 1858, and Mary (Mae) born about 1861.

== Canada ==
Prospects for an artist in Cincinnati may not have been all that Pauling had hoped, for by 1862 he had relocated his family again, this time to Hamilton on the shore of Lake Ontario, in Canada, where they would remain for the next decade.

Exhibition opportunities for artists in Canada were limited at that time, and Pauling appears to have taken advantage of the few that existed. He exhibited at least twice at the Upper Canada Provincial Exhibition. In 1862, he exhibited photographic portraits finished in oil, a medium that became popular after the introduction of photography. Another painted photograph from 1868 of a Boy Standing Beside a Twig Chair is in the collection of Library and Archives Canada. He also continued his sporadic interest in other subjects, and in 1863 he exhibited oil paintings of fruit.

Pauling appears to have had a reasonably successful career through the 1860s, and continued to be based out of Hamilton. A number of signed and dated portraits from the 1860s have surfaced at auction or for sale from time to time. He also supplemented his income with photography, as John Hannavy notes in his Encyclopedia of Nineteenth Century Photography that "in Toronto, the artist and portrait painter Richard A. Pauling took daguerreotypes of the local citizenry."

== Return to the United States ==
It may be to be closer to his wife's family that Pauling left Canada in the early 1870s to return to the United States. He was at 131 Smith Street, Cincinnati from 1873 until at least 1876. By 1878, the family had moved again to Covington, Kentucky where, in addition to the five Paulings, the household also included Fanny Pauling's brother and sister-in-law Alex and Amanda Willis, her sister Harriet Willis, and their niece and nephew Edward and Mollie Masterson.

No records have been found of Pauling's artistic activity during this last period in Covington. However, the records of the Louisiana State Museum in New Orleans record the donation by a Miss Helen Gray of Convington of "a very fine portrait by R. A. Pauling, 1859, of James Leacock, in the uniform of the Kentucky Military Institute. So Pauling may have had an earlier connection to Covington when he was living in Cincinnati in the late 1850s.

Richard Pauling died in 1881 and was buried with his first wife Jane in Spring Grove Cemetery in Cincinnati. His second wife Frances died in 1886 and was also buried in Spring Grove Cemetery.
