= Richard Cull Jr. =

American journalist

Richard J. Cull Jr. (September 12, 1914 – April 24, 1992) was a reporter in Washington D.C. for the Dayton Daily News and the Cox Newspapers syndicate from 1947 to 1962.

Cull then served as a press information officer for the U.S. Immigration and Naturalization Service from 1962 to 1975. When the survivors of the Bay of Pigs invasion were released from Cuban custody in 1962, Cull handled the press coverage of their return to the United States.
