= Richard Hirschbäck =

Austrian painter

Richard Hirschbäck (2 July 1937 – 13 July 2007) was an Austrian painter. He was a founding member of the Austrian artist group Gruppe 77.

== Life and work ==
Hirschbäck was born on 2 July 1937 in Schwarzach St. Veit. He attended the Benedictine boarding school in the Edmundsburg in Salzburg, and later studied at the Academy of Fine Arts in Vienna under Albert Paris Gütersloh. He was a member of the Austrian artist group Sezession Graz until 1977; in that year he was among the twenty-nine founding members of the Gruppe 77 artist group.

Hirschbäck died in Thumersbach, Zell am See, on 13 July 2007. He left thousands of works: drawings in ink and in pencil, paintings in water colours, in tempera and in oils, and mixed media works.

In 1972, Hirschbäck received the art prize of the town of Köflach, followed by a retrospective in the Neue Galerie der Stadt Linz, now the Lentos Museum in Linz.

His work is in the collections of the Albertina and the Österreichische Galerie Belvedere in Vienna, and the Lentos Art Museum in Linz.
