= Richard Connell (disambiguation) =

Richard Connell (1893–1949) was an American writer.

Richard Connell may also refer to:

- Richard E. Connell (1857–1912), American politician
- Richard Connell (Irish politician) (1650–1714)

== See also ==
- Richard O'Connell (disambiguation)
