= Richard Hemming =

Richard Hemming Master of Wine
- Occupation: Wine writer
- Notable awards: Finalist, Louis Roederer International Feature Writer Of The Year 2015

Website
- www.richardhemmingmw.com

Richard Hemming MW is a Singapore-based wine writer, educator, and a Master of Wine.

== Biography ==
British wine writer Richard Hemming has worked in wine since 2001. His early roles within the wine industry include being a viticultural assistant at Gusbourne Estate in Kent and six years in UK retail management with Majestic Wine.

Hemming started working with Jancis Robinson MW in 2008 and has since been writing regularly for the website JancisRobinson.com ever since. He has also been published by the Financial Times, Decanter, The Drinks Business, Harpers Wine & Spirit, The World of Fine Wine, Noble Rot and has a monthly wine column in the Off Licence News. Notable distinctions includes being shortlisted as the Louis Roederer International Feature Writer Of The Year 2015.

Alongside writing, Richard also judges in competitions such as the Decanter World Wine Awards and teaches wine courses for companies and private clients.

In September 2015, Richard Hemming became one of only 340 Masters of Wine in the world. After passing the theory exam in 2011 and tasting in 2012, his final research paper to complete the highest qualification at the Institute of Masters of Wine focused on How have trends in the publication of consumer wine books changed since 1914, and how does this inform their present prospects?
