= Richard Pokorný =

Czech paleontologist, speleologist (born 1979)

Ing. Richard Pokorný, Ph.D., DiS.
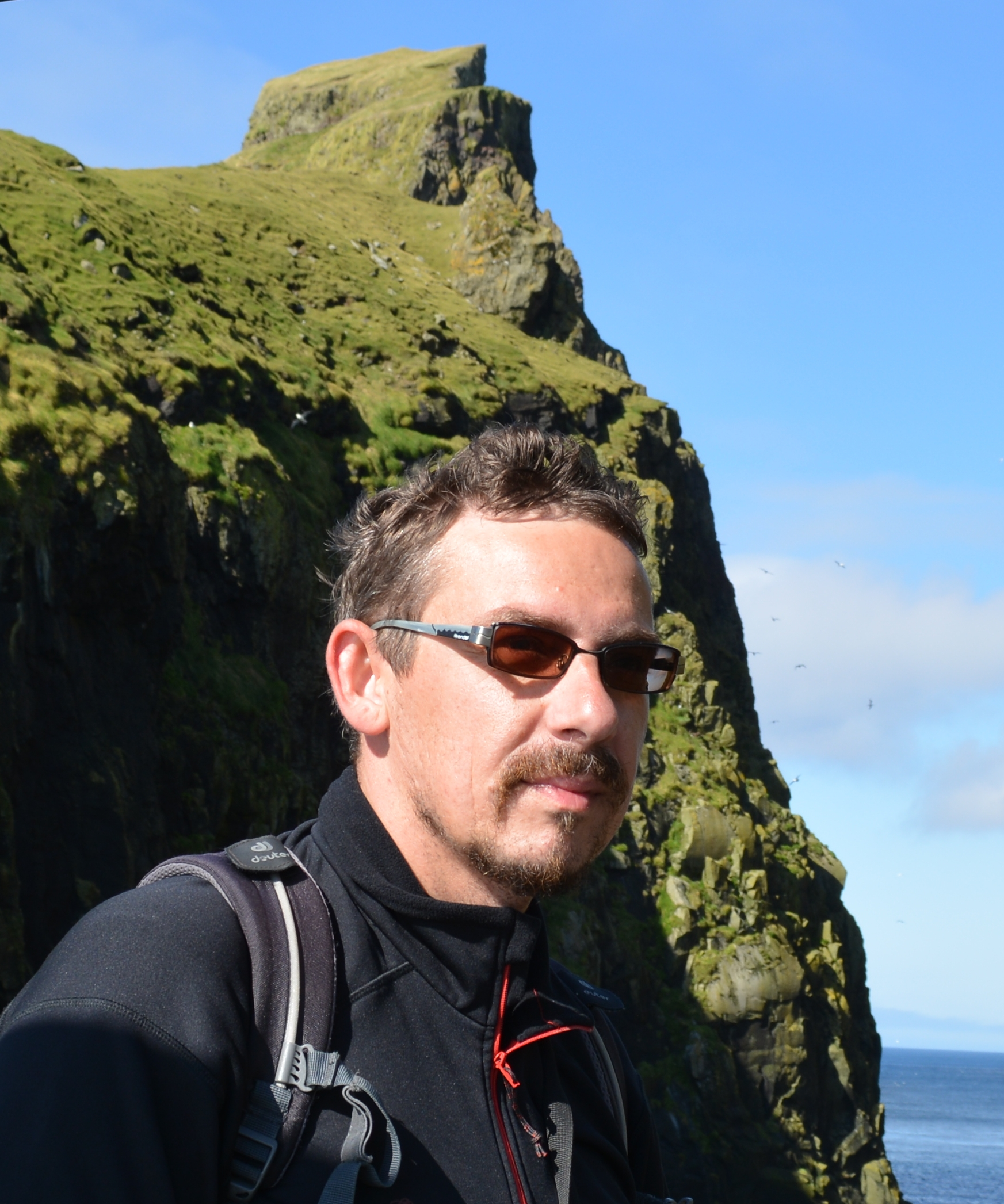
- Born: June 7, 1979 (age 47); Rychnov nad Kněžnou, Czechoslovakia
- Scientific career
- Fields: Paleontology, speleology, travelling, popular science

Notes
- member of the Czech Geological Society

Richard Pokorný (born June 7, 1979) is a Czech paleontologist, speleologist and a traveler.

== Biography ==
Pokorný was born in Rychnov nad Kněžnou, Czechoslovakia. After graduating from high school (Gymnázium Františka Martina Pelcla) there, he studied the higher vocational school in Tábor and the Faculty of Environment on Jan Evangelista Purkyně University in Ústí nad Labem. He taught subjects related to inanimate nature, most of the time he devoted to research projects and research activities and curatorship of the geological collections. He lives in Litoměřice city, he is married and he have two sons.

Since the school years he devoted himself to the collection of minerals and fossils in his neighborhoods. He began his career in research of body-fossils and trace fossils in the eastern part of the Czech Cretaceous Basin. In his publications promotes for the region the term "podorlická křída". Since 2008, he studies the fossil assemblages in the Arctic and Subarctic region.

On Iceland, he has found and described several dozen ichnotaxa, on the Faroe Islands he identified the so far only known trace-fossils, which represents the only evidence of the presence of fossil fauna of the archipelago. An important scientific contribution is the description of two new ichnotaxa – ichnogenus Funalichnus POKORNÝ, 2008, together with the type species Funalichnus strangulatus and the ichnospecies Sedilichnus smiley POKORNÝ, 2016.

The long-term interest of Richard Pokorny is caving. He explores especially the regions in the Czech Republic, which still stood at the edge of the interests of cavers (e.g. Orlické hory, České středohoří). The greatest achievements include the discovery of the Jeskyně skřítků Cave near Děčín city, considered by speleologists as lost, or the discovery of the Pleistoce rich vertebrate bone deposits in the cave on the Radobýl hill.

The research of Richard Pokorny is closely linked to his main hobby, which is traveling. Every year, he spend several weeks in Iceland, he also done research on the Faroe Islands, Argentina, Greenland, Tunisia, Sweden and Vietnam.

In 2006 he led an expedition Baobab 2006 (August 17 – September 18), dedicated to the study of animate and inanimate nature of the middle and northwest Madagascar. This expedition holds the unofficial record as the largest Czech, and (with an average of 22.6 years), the youngest team to ever visited Madagascar. The scientific samples collected during the expedition were presented at an exhibition in the National Museum in Prag

== Bibliography (books) ==
- 2004: History of the mining in the Rychnov nad Kněžnou area (together with L. Kraft and R. Symonová)
- 2007: Madagascar, the god's laboratory (In Czech: Madagaskar laboratoř bohů, together with R. Beandapa-Kytlová, T. Jůnek, D. Koubínová and R. Rybková)
- 2008: History of the mining in the Rychnov nad Kněžnou area, Vol. 2
- 2009: Caves of the Ústí nad Labem district (In Czech: Jeskyně Ústeckého kraje. Nekrasové podzemní objekty ve třetihorních vulkanitech, jejich původ, charakteristiky a biota, together with M. Holec)
- 2012: Subterranean Habitats (together with M. Holec)
- 2013: Caves in the Orlické hory and Góry Bystrzyckie Mountains (together with T. Zemánková, M. Lorenc a P. Zagożdżon, the second edition was published in 2014)

Richard Pokorny publishes the results of his research in a number of Czech and foreign journals (e.g. Vesmír, Živa, Antarctic Science, etc.). He wrote over 40 scientific articles, he is a member of the editorial board of journals Acta Musei Richnoviensis and Orlické hory a Podorlicko.
