= Richard Welch (disambiguation) =

Richard Welch (1929–1975) was an American intelligence officer.

Richard Welch may also refer to:

- Richard Welch (cricketer), English cricketer
- Richard J. Welch (1869–1940), American politician
- Richard Welch (Australian politician), Australian politician
- Richard Welch (Medal of Honor), Union Army soldier
