= Richard Picker =

American numismatist

Richard M. Picker
- Born: June 22, 1915; New York City
- Died: February 1, 1983 (aged 67); New York City
- Education: New York University (BA)
- Occupations: Numismatist, coin dealer
- Years active: 1955–1983
- Spouse: Anne Picker
- Military career
- Allegiance: United States
- Branch: United States Army
- Service years: 1943–1945
- Rank: Private
- Conflicts: World War II

Richard Picker (June 22, 1915 – February 1, 1983) was an American numismatist. Based in New York City, Picker was a specialist and dealer of coins from early and colonial American history and was considered one of the foremost authorities in that area of numismatics. Picker was best known for his research and his active collaboration within the numismatic community.

== Early life ==
Richard Picker was born on June 22, 1915, in New York to Isaac Picker and Ida Reiger. Picker developed an interest in collecting coins as a child, but was never able to explore this hobby deeply in his youth, as he spent most of his time working in his family's confection business, selling candy and popcorn at movie theaters. He went on to earn a bachelor's degree from New York University, graduating in 1938. In 1943, Picker served in the United States Army in a deployment which lasted until the end of the Second World War.

== Numismatic career ==
By 1954, Picker was a member of the American Numismatic Association with active connections and coin trading deals with other prominent numismatists of the time, such as Walter Breen and Eric Newman. Picker, in 1975, would state that he had been a member "in good standing" of the ANA for "over 25 years", implying that he began his membership in 1950.

Picker was largely interested in the research and historical aspects of numismatics, often treating his coin dealing as a means by which he could further his research. His specific interest in early American and colonial coinage began a long-running and close relationship with fellow numismatist and ANA member Eric Newman, who had similar interests. Picker soon developed a reputation for reliability and expertise, and was often consulted by collectors, other coin dealers, and research institutions due to his industrious and thorough manner of research. Picker founded the Long Island Coin Club, bringing together New York-area numismatists. Picker became notable for not publishing a vast number of research articles himself, but instead being a vital source of research and data for other numismatists. Often making his data and library freely available to those who sought his assistance, Picker was also instrumental in the writing of Newman's Early Paper Money of America reference catalog. He did publish several articles in the American Numismatic Society-published Colonial Newsletter, and penned a chapter in the American Numismatic Society's bicentennial work, Studies on Money in Early America, where he explored the varieties of early Massachusetts coinage. In 1968, Picker was nominated to be a fellow of the American Numismatic Society.

Picker encountered controversy in 1975 when he was denied a bourse table for an ANA convention after refusing to pay "voluntary contributions". This compounded earlier issues he had encountered in 1971 when his convention stock and reference material was stolen from an ANA convention security room and never recovered. The controversy was not resolved, although an active conversation developed about the growing influence of money and financial contributions outweighing numismatic expertise and experience within the organization.

Picker served as a government expert witness in a Chicago trial, cooperating with the FBI in an investigation where coins were stolen in a robbery from Yale University.

== Personal life ==
Richard Picker was married to Anne Picker and had two children.

Picker died on February 1, 1983, in New York City.
