= Richard Seymour (photographer) =

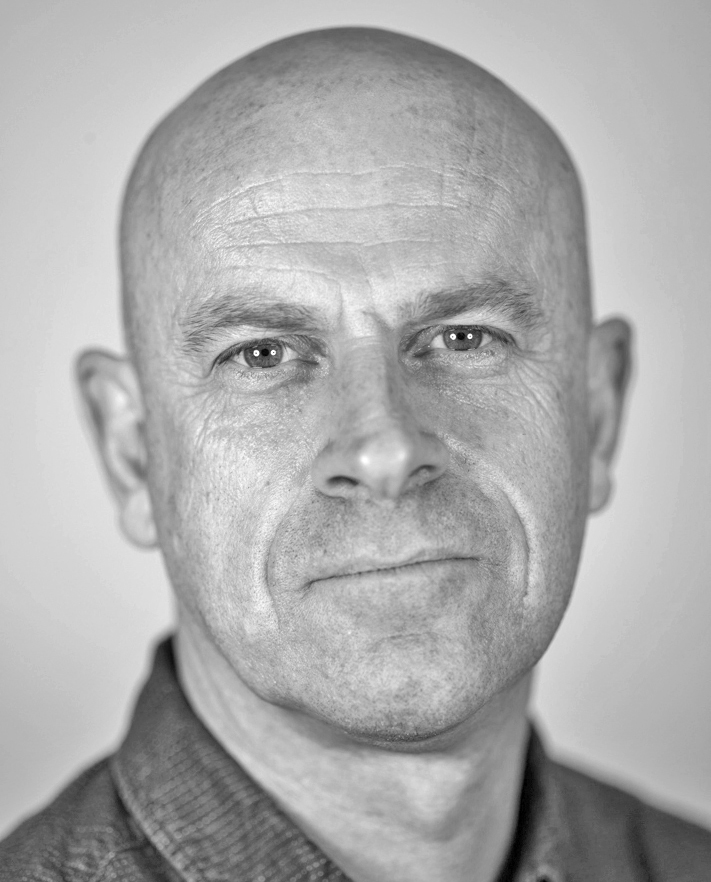
Richard Seymour

Richard Seymour is a UK-based commercial and advertising photographer, specialising in automotive and aerospace photography, often using advanced composite and CGI.

== Early life ==
Seymour undertook an RAF flying scholarship at the age of 17. He studied Photography at the University of Westminster, and set up his first Studio in Dubai after graduating.

Seymour relocated from Dubai to the UK and worked as an assistant for five years to advertising photographers, including Bob Carlos Clarke, Hazel Digby, Ron Bambridge and Martin Vallis, before going on to establish his own commercial practice.

== Practice ==
Seymour is known for his CGI and advanced composite work. Seymour's camera of choice is the Leica S, which he first used to document the Virgin Galactic Space Programme.

== Career and awards ==
Seymour has won several awards, including Best Commissioned Advertising in the 2012 AOP Awards for his photo for SMMT taken inside the Bentley factory at Crewe, and non-Commissioned Environment at the AOP awards in 2015 for a photograph of the VW Autostadt Car Towers and in the IPA One Shot Awards in New York for Porche Type 64 Ice Race.

In 2013 Seymour was a judge for the AOP Open Awards and has participated as a speaker at numerous photographic events including Photokina on behalf of Leica in 2012 and the AOP Seminar series in 2014.

Seymour has worked closely with Leica since 2012 as a Leica brand Ambassador for the Leica S System of cameras and lenses, and his work using this equipment has featured as a backdrop at their Burlington Arcade store in London.

The 2017 short “The making of a masterpiece“ depicting the manufacturing of the iconic Leica M10 went viral with over half a million plays.

Seymour is a non-executive board member of the Association of Photographers.
