= Richard Mishaan =

Colombian interior designer

- Born: Bogota, Colombia
- Education: New York University; Columbia University; Harvard University
- Occupations: Interior designer, Interior architect
- Spouse: Marcia Mishaan
- Children: 2

Richard Mishaan is an interior designer based in New York City. He has worked on designs for Sony Corporation of America, the Shelborne Hotel in South Beach, Miami, Florida, the Hotel Tcherassi in Cartagena, Colombia, and the presidential suite for the St. Regis Hotel in New York City. Mishaan has also designed furniture for Bolier and Company, lighting for Urban Electric Co., and accessories for Asia Tides.

== Early life and education ==
Mishaan was born in Bogota, Colombia. He moved to New York in 1978. He attended New York University Tisch School of the Arts (Undergraduate Degree) Columbia University School of Architecture for real estate development and architecture and attended Harvard Business School.

== Career ==
After graduating from Columbia University, in the 1970s and 1980s, he became a fashion designer. Mishaan also owned a sports-wear company called Chose Classique, and designed under a label with his name.

In 1997, Mishaan opened a retail design shop called Homer. In 2008, the Whitney Museum of American Art reclaimed the area of Madison Avenue where the shop was located, and the shop relocated to the A&D building on 58th Street.

Mishaan released his first book, Modern Luxury, in 2009. That same year, he designed a showcase apartment for Hearst Magazine in collaboration with Town & Country.

In 2011, Mishaan worked with Soicher Marin to release a 76-item art collection. That same year he designed the living room of the Kips Bay Decorator Show House.

In 2012, HSN, formerly the Home Shopping Network, worked with Universal Pictures to create a product line to be featured on HSN which would promote the movie Snow White and the Huntsman. Mishaan created home furnishing products for the promotion including candlesticks, lamps, mirrors and decorative pillows.

In 2013, Mishaan announced he would reopen Homer, the retail store which he closed in 2008. The new iteration in Greenwich Village would have a revolving collection of furniture, decorative accessories, and art. The store offerings would include furniture Mishaan designed for Bolier as well as lighting he designed for Urban Electric. Mishaan released his second book, Artfully Modern: Interiors by Richard Mishaan, in 2014 featuring his New York designs. The book reached number one in its category on Amazon.com. That same year, Mishaan's design company, Richard Mishaan Design, was included on the AD100 list of the world's best interior designers and architects.

Mishaan worked with Bromley Caldari Architects to design luxury condos at 17 East 12th Street in 2014. He designed a 6,300sqft apartment at 101 Warren Street in Tribeca, which included Macassar ebony millwork in the living room and Bizazza mosaic tiles in the bathroom with a Duravit Starck oval tub. He has also worked on the renovation of The Shelborne Wyndham Grand South Beach, the Tcherassi Hotel and Spa in Cartagena, Colombia with fashion designer Silvia Tcherassi, homes in Sag Harbor, New York and London, a suite for St. Regis Hotel, and a show house for the Holiday House Hamptons in Bridgehampton, New York.

In 2017, his designs were featured in the first-floor sitting room of the Kips Bay Show House which included custom wallpaper by Iksel Decorative Arts and was inspired by Turkish and Venetian palaces.

== Personal life ==
Mishaan and his wife Marcia live in New York and have two children. They have a house in Long Island, New York, and apartment in Manhattan, and a retreat in Cartagena, Colombia.

== Bibliography ==
- Richard Mishaan, Elizabeth Gaynor (2009). Modern Luxury. Monaceli Press. ISBN 9781580932288.
- Richard Mishaan, Judith Nasatir (2014). Artfully Modern: Interiors by Richard Mishaan. Monacelli Press. ISBN 9781580934008.
