= Richard Beeard =

Richard Beeard, also Berde or Beard, (fl. 1552–1578) was a Tudor clergyman, poet, and hymn writer.

== Ballads and Psalms ==
=== Master Harry Whoball's Mon to Master Camell Greets ===
Beeard's origins are obscure. There is no record of his existence until 1552, when he took part in the sequence of mainly humorous poems which followed in the wake of the contention between Thomas Churchyard and Thomas Camell. None of the items in this literary quarrel is dated, but all of them are now thought to have been composed in 1552. Beeard first wrote a short poem called: Master Harry Whoball's Mon to Master Camell Greets. (The word mon is the form of man used in the Mummerzet of this poem.) It was printed by Richard Lant, and is a reply by Beeard, posing as the servant of the clown Harry Whoball, to Camell’s To Goodman Chappell's Supplication. (Geoffrey Chappell is the name of a probably fictitious contributor to the set of poems, and Churchyard is no doubt the real writer.) Beeard’s name is not given, but an acrostic reveals the author as: Ar.I.S.A.A.Ar.D.B.Y.A.Ar.D. Whoball's servant berates Chappell for not recognising the dignity of his wealthy and substantial master, and accuses him of writing whilst drunk.

=== Alphabetum primum Beeardi ===
The second poem is called: Alphabetum primum Beeardi (Latin: Beeard’s first alphabet). It was printed by William Copland, and is signed ‘Finis. Quod Richarde Beearde’. Beeard writes a moral couplet for each of the letters of the alphabet, to the general intent that Camell should behave more responsibly and retire from the stage of controversy.

=== A Godly Psalm of Mary Queen ===
In 1553, Beeard wrote A Godly Psalm of Mary Queen. It was printed by John Kingston for William Griffith shortly after princess Mary triumphed over John Dudley, Duke of Northumberland, and his faction on 19 July 1553. Beeard congratulates Mary on her successful defeat of the forces that opposed her accession to the throne, and trusts that she will carry on the good work in reforming church and society begun by her brother Edward VI. The verse pamphlet also includes three short paraphrases of psalms 145. 146, and 148 by the clergyman Thomas Bownell, under the title ‘A Godly Psalm’. It has a musical setting for four voices.

== Clergyman in England and Ireland ==
=== In England : 1559–1563 ===
Richard Beeard was ordained deacon and priest on 22 December 1559. He was described as resident in the diocese of Coventry and Lichfield, and this may indicate that his family came from the north midlands of England. In 1560, ‘Rich. Beard’ was a curate at St Benet Fink, in London. Nothing more is known in this connection, but it is presumably him. Then, on 31 May 1560, Richard Beeard was collated to the rectory of St Mary at Hill, Billingsgate, in London. The right to present candidates to this living was owned by the merchant Henry Goderick, who on this occasion had allowed Beeard to be presented by Jane Killingworth, alias Sanderson. She was the wife of the adventurous draper George Killingworth, first agent of the Muscovy Company in Russia, who negotiated with Ivan the Terrible in Moscow in 1555. Their connection with Beeard is not known. Beeard remained at St Mary at Hill until he was deprived in 1574, but he was constantly looking about for other livings.

On 25 June 1561, Richard Beeard was both collated and instituted to the rectory of East Horsley, in Surrey. This was a peculiar of the archbishop of Canterbury, which means that Beeard must have been presented by Matthew Parker. However, another clergyman, Richard Davies, claimed an interest in the same, though he failed to make his claim good. In the meantime, Parker had preferred one of his favourites, William Atherton, to the living, and Atherton was collated and instituted to the rectory of East Horsley on 1 December 1561.

Beeard had been busy elsewhere during this period. On 25 September 1561, he was instituted to the vicarage of Greenwich, in Kent. From this appointment, we learn that Beeard had been to university and gained the degree of Bachelor of Arts; but no record of his presence at either university is known until the 1570s. He continued to serve St Mary at Hill, and, on 13 September 1563, a curate, Thomas Reigate, was appointed to help with pastoral care at Greenwich. Reigate was finally presented to the vicarage in Beard’s place on 12 September 1566.

Then, on 10 October 1563, sir George Howard wrote to Matthew Parker, recommending Beeard, whom he calls his ‘friend’ and ‘our vicar of Greenwich’, for an unspecified living to which he thought he might be helped by the archbishop. Howard lived in Kidbrooke, Kent, not far from Greenwich. In his reply of the same month, Parker replied, saying that he had interviewed Beeard, but did not think he was quite ready for the living in question.

=== In Ireland : 1563—1565 ===
Two months after this disappointment, Beeard was in Ireland. He arrived in Dublin on 26 December 1563, and the local hierarchy was keen to keep him in Ireland. On 3 March 1564, Adam Loftus, bishop of Armagh, and Hugh Brady, bishop of Meath, wrote to sir William Cecil asking that he should arrange the promotion of Richard Beeard. ‘vicar of Greenwich’, to the bishopric of Kildare. Brady wrote again on 14 March, praising Beeard’s virtues and diligence. Again, Beeard was disappointed, but six months later, on 26 November 1564, ‘Richard Beard, clerk’, was presented by the crown to the archdeaconry of Cashel, Ireland. And on 26 March 1565, ‘Richard Beard, clerk’ was presented to the vicarage of Saints Quoan and Brogan at Mothel in Lismore, in County Waterford. There is no evidence, however, that Beeard took up residence at either living.

=== In England : 1573—1578 ===
Atherton’s institution to the rectory of East Horsley was confirmed in a writ of 10 November 1573. It reveals that Beeard was instituted to the rectory, but never inducted, and that it was Atherton who had the benefits of the living and not himself. Beeard’s luck was clearly changing. For the following year, on 17 February 1574, he was deprived of St Mary at Hill on the grounds of non-residency. This was despite a claim in his defence that he was studying at the University of Oxford. On 3 March 1574, he was sequestrated for the non-payment of his first fruits, which he still owed from his institution in 1560.

Perhaps it was about now, in his time of need, that Beeard wrote the first part of a Latin treatise of justification: De vera iustificatione Christiani hominis coram deo, praecipuae doctorum et patrum sententiae (The principle statements by the fathers and doctors of the church on the true justification of the Christian person before God). The only part of this work that survives is the dedication to queen Elizabeth. Here we learn that, after he was ordained a minister, he decided that he should not only preach, but also write, and to defend the Church of England ‘contra papistas [against the papists]’. His plan was to go through the gospels and to prove that they all agreed on the doctrine of justification taught by the Church of England. The treatise remained unfinished.

All was not lost. On 2 May 1577, Beeard was appointed to the rectory of Northampton All Saints, with the unusual note that he was granted it for life. He did not keep it long, but sold it on to William Jennings on 19 December 1578. He had probably never visited his parish, for on 4 April 1578, John, the son of ‘Richard Beard, minister’, was baptised at St Mary Woolnoth, London. Presumably, Beeard was still working as a clergyman in London, but we know no more of him after this record.
