= Richard Bertinet =

Breton baker

Richard Bertinet is a Breton baker who bakes and teaches in Bath, Somerset. He has campaigned for "real bread" and he was acclaimed as a food champion by the BBC in 2010.
