= Richard Harris (disambiguation) =

Richard Harris (1930–2002) was an Irish actor, singer, theatrical producer, film director and writer.

Richard Harris may also refer to:

== Politicians ==
- Richard Harris (1777–1854), British Radical politician
- Dick Harris (born 1944), Canadian politician
- Richard Reader Harris (Conservative politician) (1913–2009), British Conservative politician

== Entertainers ==
- Richard Harris (composer) (born 1968), British composer, teacher and pianist
- Richard Harris (television writer) (born 1934), British television writer
- Richard Harris, member of doo-wop group The Marcels
- Richard A. Harris (born 1934), American film editor
- Ricky Harris (1962–2016), American producer, actor and comedian
- Richard Rankin (born 1983), Scottish actor and comedian, born Richard Harris

== Sportspeople ==
- Dick Harris (center) (1928–2003), American football center
- Dick Harris (cornerback) (born 1937), former American football defensive back
- Dick Harris (Australian rules footballer) (1911–1993), Australian rules footballer
- Dick L. Harris (1885–1945), Australian rules footballer
- Dickie Harris (born 1950), American football player in the CFL
- Richard Harris (American football) (1948–2011), former NFL player and CFL coach
- Richard Harris (footballer) (born 1980), English former footballer
- Rick Harris (1948–2025), American wrestler known as Black Bart

== Other people ==
- J. Richard Harris (1910–1994), Irish entomologist, fishing consultant and tackle merchant, and author
- Richard Harris (anaesthetist) (born 1964), cave diver involved in the Tham Luang cave rescue and lieutenant governor of South Australia
- Richard Harris (college principal), principal of Brasenose College, Oxford, 1573–1595
- Richard Harris (prospector) (1833–1907), Canadian miner and prospector
- Richard H. Harris (1918–1976), American civil rights leader
- Richard Reader Harris (barrister) (1847–1909), English barrister, counselor to Queen Victoria, Methodist minister
- Richard Deodatus Poulett-Harris (1817–1899), English/Australian educator
- Richard Clinton Harris (1939–2021), American lichenologist

== See also ==
- Richard Harries, Baron Harries of Pentregarth (1936–2026), former Anglican Bishop of Oxford and broadcaster
