= Richard Leonard (disambiguation) =

Richard Leonard (born 1962) is the former Leader of the Scottish Labour Party.

Richard Leonard may also refer to:

- Richard M. Leonard (1908–1993), American rock climber and environmentalist
- Dick Leonard (1930–2021), British writer, journalist and politician
- J. Rich Leonard (born 1949), American judge
- Richard Leonard (Canadian football) (born 1991), Canadian football player
- Richard Leonard (bowls), Irish lawn bowls champion

== See also ==
- Rick Leonard (born 1996), American football player
