= Rikard =

Given name

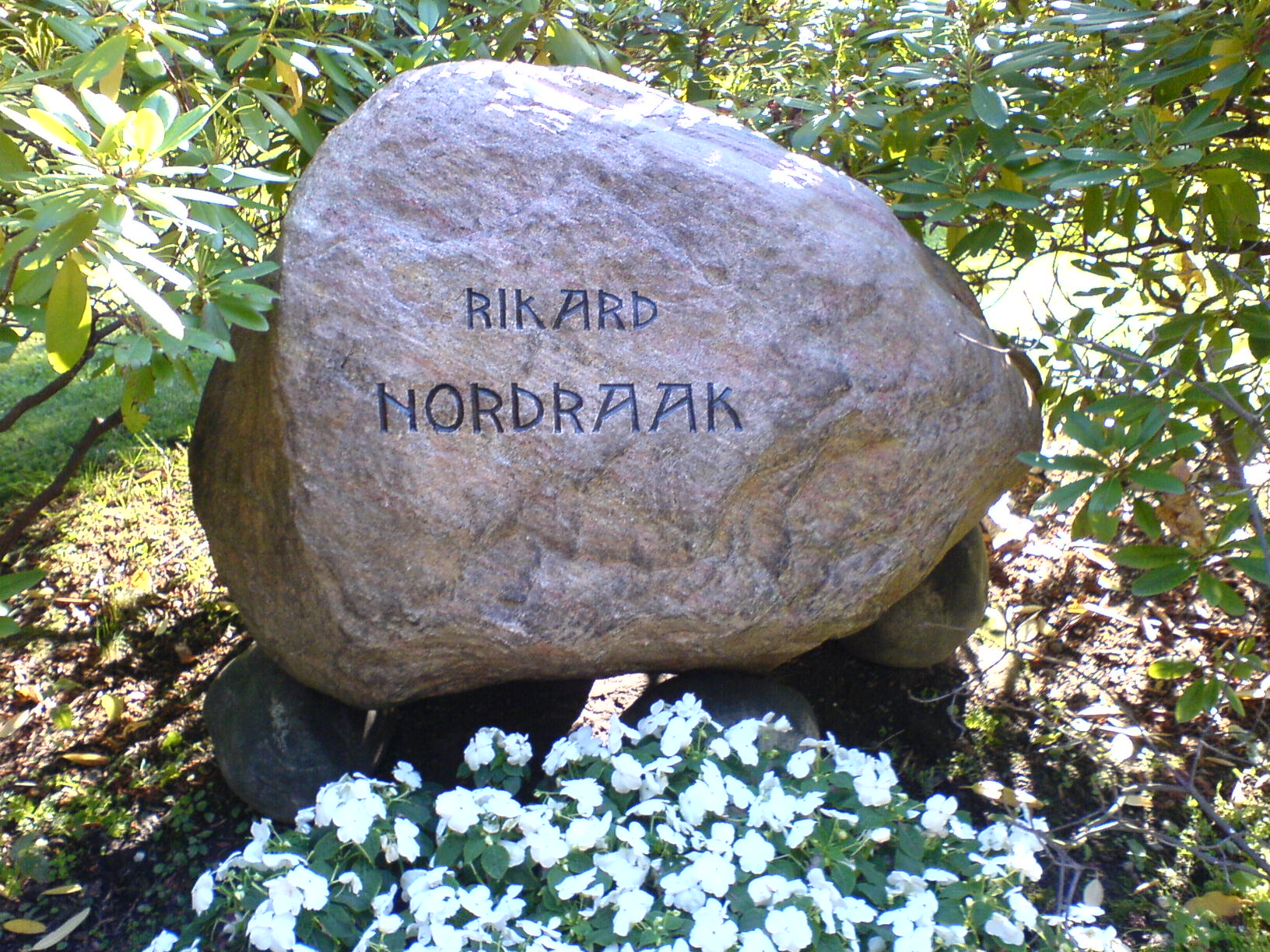
Rikard Nordraak's tomb at Vår Frelsers Gravlund in Oslo, Norway

Rikard is a given name. Notable people with the name include:

- Rikard Andreasson (born 1979), Swedish cross country skier
- Rikard Berge (1881–1969), Norwegian folklorist, museologist biographer and magazine editor
- Rikard Bergh (born 1966), former professional tennis player from Sweden
- Rikard Franzén (born 1968), retired professional ice hockey defenceman
- Ivan Rikard Ivanović (1880–1949), one of the founders of the Croatian National Progressive Party (NNS)
- Rikard Jorgovanić (1853–1880), Croatian writer
- Rikard Karlberg (born 1986), Swedish professional golfer
- Rikard Larsson (born 1966), Swedish politician
- Rikard Lenac (1868–1949), lawyer and a one-time governor of the city of Fiume (Rijeka)
- Rikard Lindroos (born 1985), Finnish footballer
- Rikard Nilsson (born 1983), Swedish football defender
- Rikard Nordraak (1842–1866), Norwegian composer who composed the Norwegian national anthem
- Rikard Nordstrøm (1893–1955), Danish gymnast who competed in the 1912 Summer Olympics
- Rikard Norling (born 1971), Swedish football manager
- Rikard Nyström (1884–1943), Swedish missionary
- Rikard Olsvik (1930–2017), Norwegian politician for the Labour Party
- Rikard Salander (born 1981), Swedish politician for the Green Party
- Rikard Sjöblom (born 1982), Swedish singer and musician
- Rikard Wolff (1958–2017), Swedish stage and screen actor and singer
- Richard I of Normandy (932-996), Third Duke of Normandy, likely born and known as Rikard
