= Richard M. Isackes =

American theater scholar

Richard M. Isackes is an American theater scholar, currently the Joanne Sharp Crosby Regents Chair in Design and Technology at University of Texas at Austin.

Isackes has twice been the recipient of the Boston Circle Critics award for best scene design for his productions of Translations and Uncle Vanya at the Huntington Theatre. A partial listing of other companies where his work has been produced include: the Opera Theatre of St. Louis, Chicago Lyric Opera, Alabama Shakespeare Festival, Cincinnati Playhouse in the Park, the Hartman Theatre Company, La MaMa Theatre of New York, Boston Lyric Opera, and the Charles Playhouse. Isackes has also designed scenery for CBS, PBS, and NBC.

He is co-author of The Art of the Hollywood Backdrop.
