= Ritchie (surname) =

Ritchie is a Scottish surname. Notable people with the surname include:

- Adele Ritchie (1874–1930), American actress
- Adrian Ritchie, American basketball player
- Al Ritchie (1890–1966), Canadian football player and sports coach
- Alan Ritchie (born 1951), Scottish trade unionist
- Alan MacDougall Ritchie (1893–1964), British Army general
- Albert Ritchie (1876–1936), American politician
- Alex Ritchie (1935–2023), Australian palaeontologist
- Alexander Handyside Ritchie (1804–1870), Scottish sculptor
- Alexander Hay Ritchie (1822–1895), American engraver
- Alistair Ferguson Ritchie (1890–1954), British crossword compiler
- Allison Ritchie (born 1974), Australian politician
- Amelia Ritchie (born 1999), Welsh footballer
- Anabela Ritchie (born 1949), Macau politician
- Andrea Ritchie, American activist and author
- Andrew Ritchie (art historian) (1907–1978), Museum director
- Andrew Ritchie (British Army officer) (born 1953), British Army general
- Andrew Ritchie (inventor) (born c. 1947), British inventor and entrepreneur
- Andrew Ritchie (judge) (born 1960), British High Court judge
- Andrew Ritchie (priest) (1880–1956), Scottish Anglican priest
- Andrew Jackson Ritchie (1868–1948), American politician
- Andy Ritchie (English footballer) (born 1960), English footballer and manager
- Andy Ritchie (Scottish footballer) (born 1956), Scottish footballer
- Andy Ritchie (swimmer) (born 1958), Canadian swimmer
- Anna Ritchie (archaeologist) (1943–2026), British archaeologist
- Annabel Ritchie (born 1978), New Zealand rower and lawyer
- Anne Thackeray Ritchie (1837–1919), English writer
- Anthony Ritchie (born 1960), New Zealand composer
- Anthony Elliot Ritchie (1915–1997), Scottish physiologist and educator
- Archibald Ritchie (British Army officer) (1869–1955), British Army officer
- Archibald Ritchie (footballer, born 1868) (1868–1932), Scottish footballer
- Archibald Ritchie (footballer, born 1894) (1894–1973), Scottish footballer
- Archibald Alexander Ritchie (1806–1856), American businessman
- Arthur Ritchie (priest) (1849–1921), American Anglo-Catholic priest
- Arthur Brown Ritchie (1885–1977), Canadian politician
- Arthur David Ritchie (1891-1967), British chemical physiologist and philosopher
- Bell T. Ritchie (1893–1970), American musician and vocalist
- Benjamin Ritchie (1980–2025), American convicted murderer
- Beulah Boyd Ritchie (1864–1939), American suffragist
- Bill Ritchie (1931–2010), Scottish cartoonist
- Bill Ritchie (politician) (1927–2014), Canadian politician
- Billie Ritchie (1878–1921), Scottish comedian
- Billy Ritchie (1936–2016), Scottish footballer
- Billy Ritchie (musician) (born 1944), Scottish musician
- Bob Ritchie (ice hockey) (born 1955), Canadian ice hockey player
- Boh Ritchie (born 2007), New Zealand middle-distance runner
- Brett Ritchie (born 1993), Canadian ice hockey player
- Brian Ritchie (born 1960), American musician
- Bruce Ritchie (born 1965), British property developer
- Bryan Ritchie (born 1954), New Zealand cricketer
- Burton Ritchie, American film producer
- Buzz Ritchie (born 1947), American politician
- Byron Ritchie (born 1977), Canadian ice hockey player
- Byron F. Ritchie (1853–1928), American politician
- Calum Ritchie (born 2005), Canadian ice hockey player
- Cedric Ritchie (1927–2016), Canadian banker
- Charles Ritchie (diplomat) (1906–1995), Canadian diplomat and diarist
- Charles Ritchie (priest) (1887–1958), Anglican clergyman
- Charlie Ritchie (1933–2008), Scottish rugby union player
- Charlotte Ritchie (born 1989), British actress
- Chris Ritchie (born 1949), Royal Australian Navy officer
- Clint Ritchie (1938–2009), American actor
- Craig Ritchie, Scottish psychiatrist and researcher
- Curt Ritchie, American football coach
- Cynthia D. Ritchie, American filmmaker, analyst and social media campaigner
- Daniel Ritchie (born 1987), British rower
- Daniel L. Ritchie (1931–2025), American businessman
- Darren Ritchie (actor) (born 1977), American actor and singer
- Darren Ritchie (long jumper) (born 1975), Scottish long jumper
- Dave Ritchie (footballer) (born 1935), Australian rules footballer
- Dave Ritchie (gridiron football) (1938–2024), Canadian football player
- Dave Ritchie (ice hockey) (1891-1973), Canadian ice hockey player
- David "Tarzan" Ritchie (born 1945), Scottish shinty player
- David Ritchie (cricketer) (1892–1974), English cricketer
- David Ritchie (diplomat) (born 1955), Australian diplomat
- David Ritchie (footballer) (born 1971), English footballer
- David Ritchie (moderator) (1763–1844), Scottish minister
- David Ritchie (politician) (1812–1867), American politician
- David Ritchie (physicist), Physics and semiconductor professor
- David Ritchie (surgeon) (1920–1993), Scottish surgeon
- David George Ritchie (1853–1903), Scottish philosopher
- David J. Ritchie (1950–2009), American game designer
- Deanna Ritchie (born 1995), New Zealand field hockey player
- DeeDee Ritchie (born 1953), American politician
- Dennis Ritchie (1941–2011), American computer scientist known for Unix
- Don Ritchie (1926–2012), Australian humanitarian and suicide preventionist
- Don Ritchie (runner) (1944–2018), Scottish ultramarathon runner
- Donald A. Ritchie (born 1945), American historian
- Donna Ritchie (born 1963), Australian wheelchair basketball player
- Douglas Ritchie (1905–1967), British journalist
- Douglas Hamilton Ritchie (1918–1999), Rhodesian dentist and politician
- Duncan Ritchie (New Zealand footballer), New Zealand footballer
- Duncan Ritchie (footballer, born 1886) (1886–1968), Scottish footballer
- Dwight Ritchie (1992–2019), Australian boxer
- Edgar Ritchie (1916–2002), Canadian diplomat
- Edgar Ritchie (engineer) (1871–1956), Australian hydraulic engineer
- Edward Samuel Ritchie (1814–1895), American inventor and physicist
- Eliza Ritchie (1856–1933), Canadian suffragist
- Elizabeth Ritchie (1754–1835), British Methodist biographer
- Emily Nelson Ritchie (1859–1916), American civic leader
- Erika Ritchie (born 1969), Canadian politician
- Ernie Ritchie (c.1898–??), Australian rugby union player
- Fiona Ritchie (born 1960), radio broadcaster
- Frances Ritchie (born 1942), British nurse and Anglican religious sister
- Frank Ritchie, New Zealand broadcaster
- Franklin Ritchie (1865–1918), American actor
- George Ritchie (footballer, born 1889) (1889–1960), English footballer
- George Ritchie (footballer, born 1904) (1904–1978), Scottish footballer
- George Ritchie (moderator) (1808–1888), Scottish minister and moderator
- George Ritchie (organist), American organist
- George Ritchie (politician) (1864–1944), Australian politician
- George Ritchie (rugby union, born 1848) (1848–1896), Scotland international rugby union player
- George Ritchie (rugby union, born 1909) (1909–1993), Scotland international rugby union player
- George G. Ritchie (1923–2007), American writer and psychiatrist
- George Stephen Ritchie (1914–2012), British admiral
- Gordon Ritchie (1918–1998), Canadian politician
- Graeme Ritchie (1957–1997), Scottish motorcycle racer
- Graham Ritchie (born 1998), Canadian cross-country skier
- Greg Ritchie (born 1960), Australian cricketer
- Gregg Ritchie (born 1964), American baseball player and coach
- Guy Ritchie (born 1968), English filmmaker
- Hannah Ritchie (born 1993), Scottish data scientist
- Harold Ritchie (born 1949), American politician
- Harriet Ritchie (1821–1907), New Zealand matron and dressmaker
- Harry Ritchie (born 1958), journalist
- Harry Ritchie (footballer) (1898–1941), Scottish footballer
- Helene Ritchie (born 1945), New Zealand politician
- Henry Ritchie (1876–1958), British Navy officer
- Ian Ritchie (architect) (born 1947), British architect
- Ian Ritchie (businessman), Scottish businessman
- Ian Ritchie (producer), composer and musician
- Innes Ritchie (born 1973), Scottish footballer
- J. C. Ritchie (born 1994), South African professional golfer
- J. Murdoch Ritchie (1925–2008), British biophysicist
- J. Wadsworth Ritchie (1861–1924), American sportsman and rancher
- Jack Ritchie (1922–1983), pen name of John George Reitci, American novelist
- James Ritchie (Massachusetts politician) (1815–1873), American politician
- James Ritchie (naturalist) (1882–1958), President of the Royal Society of Edinburgh
- James Ritchie (rugby union) (1907–1942), Scotland international rugby union player
- James Dale Ritchie (1976–2016), American serial killer
- James Ewing Ritchie (1820–1898), English writer and journalist
- James H. Ritchie Jr. (born 1961), American politician
- James M. Ritchie (1829–1918), American politician
- Jamie Ritchie (born 1996), Scotland international rugby union player
- Jane Ritchie (1936–2023), New Zealand psychologist and academic
- Jay Ritchie (1936–2016), American baseball player
- Jean Ritchie (1922–2015), American folk singer and songwriter
- Jill Ritchie (born 1974), American actress
- Jim Ritchie (businessman) (1907–1981), Businessman, Anglican church administrator
- Jim Ritchie (rugby union) (born 1926), Northern Ireland rugby union player
- Jimmy Ritchie (1925–2003), Scottish footballer
- Joanne Ritchie, Canadian triathlete
- Joe Ritchie (1947–2022), American money manager
- Joe Ritchie (footballer) (1886–1975), Australian rules footballer
- John Ritchie (abolitionist) (1817–1887), American abolitionist
- John Ritchie (American Civil War) (1836–1919), American Union Army officer
- John Ritchie (Australian footballer) (1932–2008), Australian rules footballer
- John Ritchie (composer) (1921–2014), New Zealand composer
- John Ritchie (footballer, born 1941) (1941–2007), English footballer
- John Ritchie (footballer, born 1944), English footballer
- John Ritchie (footballer, born 1947) (1947–2018), Scottish footballer and manager
- John Ritchie (footballer, born 1951) (born 1951), English footballer
- John Ritchie (Maryland politician) (1831–1887), American judge
- John Ritchie (merchant) (c. 1745–1790), Canadian politician
- John Ritchie (newspaper owner) (1778–1870), Scottish newspaper owner
- John L. Ritchie (1876–1943), Scottish footballer
- John Macfarlane Ritchie (1842–1912), New Zealand businessman
- John Neish Ritchie (1904–1977), Scottish veterinarian
- John William Ritchie (1808–1890), Canadian Father of Confederation
- Jon Ritchie (born 1974), American football player
- Joseph Ritchie (c. 1788–1819), English surgeon, explorer and naturalist
- Joseph C. Ritchie, American politician from Virginia
- Joseph Marcus Ritchie (1946–1989), American organist, choirmaster, and composer
- Josh Ritchie (born 1994), English television personality
- Joshua H. Ritchie (born 1938), American rabbi
- Josiah Ritchie (1870–1955), British tennis player
- JR Ritchie (born 2003), American baseball player
- June Ritchie (born 1938), English actress
- Kate Ritchie (born 1978), Australian actress
- Katie Ritchie, New Zealand netball player
- Keegan Ritchie (born 1990), South African soccer player
- Ken Ritchie (born 1946), British psephologist
- Kimberly Ritchie, American marine biologist
- Larry Ritchie, jazz drummer (1950s–1960s)
- Laura Ritchie (born 1973), American cellist
- Leitch Ritchie (1800–1865), Scottish novelist and journalist
- Lewis Ritchie (born 1952), Scottish medical academic
- M. Delmar Ritchie (1875–1916), American football player, coach, and physician
- Major Ritchie (1870–1955), English tennis player
- Malcolm Ritchie (1894–1971), Australian businessman & political activist
- Margaret Ritchie (politician) (born 1958), Northern Irish politician
- Margaret Ritchie (soprano) (1903–1969), English singer
- Marjorie Ritchie (1948–2015), Scottish animal scientist
- Mark Ritchie (pinball designer) (born 1958), American pinball designer
- Mark Ritchie (politician) (born 1951), American politician
- Mark Ritchie (trader) (born 1956), American commodities trader
- Martin Ritchie (1917–1993), British businessman
- Marylyn D. Ritchie, American geneticist
- Matt Ritchie (born 1989), English footballer
- Matthew Ritchie (born 1964), British artist
- Max Ritchie (1934–2018), Australian rules footballer
- Meg Ritchie (born 1952), Scottish discus thrower and shot putter
- Michael Ritchie (artistic director) (born 1957), artistic director
- Michael Ritchie (filmmaker) (1938–2001), American film director
- Michael Ritchie (shinty) (born 1972), Scottish shinty player
- Michael G. Ritchie (born 1962), British evolutionary biologist
- Mowbray Ritchie (1905–1966), Scottish chemist and scientific author
- Nancy Adkin Ritchie (1916–1964), New Zealand artist
- Neil Ritchie (1897–1983), British general
- Neil Ritchie (cyclist) (1933–2017), New Zealand cyclist
- Neville Ritchie (born 1950), New Zealand archeologist
- Nick Ritchie (born 1995), Canadian ice hockey player
- Octavia Ritchie (1868–1948), Canadian physician and suffragist
- Oscar W. Ritchie (1909–1967), American educator and sociologist
- Patrick Dunbar Ritchie (1907–1981), British chemist
- Patty Ritchie (born 1962), American politician
- Paul Ritchie (footballer, born 1969) (born 1969), Scottish football player (East Fife)
- Paul Ritchie (footballer, born 1975) (born 1975), Scottish football player (Heart of Midlothian, Dundee United)
- Paula Ritchie, Scottish cricketer
- Peter Ritchie, Canadian lawyer
- Phil Ritchie (rugby league) (born 1959), Australian rugby league footballer
- R. Stephen Ritchie (born 1942), American Air Force General
- Raleigh Ritchie (Jacob Basil Anderson, born 1990), English actor, singer-songwriter, rapper, and record producer
- Ray Ritchie (1936–2015), Australian rugby footballer and coach
- Ray Ritchie (Australian rules footballer) (1889–1950), Australian rules footballer
- Reece Ritchie (born 1986), British actor
- Rene Ritchie (born 1972), Canadian technology journalist
- Rex Ritchie (1914–2006), Australian rules footballer
- Ria Ritchie (born 1987), English pop singer
- Richard Ritchie (born 1955), American football player
- Richard Stephen Ritchie (born 1942), United States general
- Richmond Ritchie (1854–1912), Indian-born British civil servant
- Robert Ritchie (Australian politician) (1836–1891), Scottish-born Australian politician
- Robert Ritchie (footballer) (1884–1954), Australian rules footballer
- Robert Ritchie (priest) (1845–1907), American Anglo-Catholic priest
- Robert Ritchie (racing driver), Hong Kong racecar driver
- Robert J. Ritchie (politician), Canadian politician
- Robert J. Ritchie (railroad executive), Canadian businessman
- Kid Rock (born Robert James Ritchie, 1971), American rapper and singer-songwriter
- Robert O. Ritchie (born 1948), American engineer
- Robert Peel Ritchie (1835–1902), Scottish physician
- Roland Ritchie (1910–1988), Canadian jurist
- Ron Ritchie (1918–2007), Canadian politician
- Ryder Ritchie (born 2006), Swedish-Canadian ice hockey player
- Samuel J. Ritchie, founder of the Canadian Copper Company
- Scot Ritchie, Canadian author and illustrator
- Sharon Ritchie (born 1937), Miss America 1956
- Sheila Ritchie (born 1957), British politician
- Stanley Ritchie, American music professor
- Stark Ritchie (1916–2001), American football player and lawyer
- Steve Ritchie (pinball designer) (born 1950), pinball and video game designer
- Steve Ritchie (footballer) (born 1954), Scottish football player
- Stevi Ritchie (born 1980), English singer and television personality
- Stuart Ritchie (footballer) (born 1968), English footballer and manager
- Stuart Ritchie (soccer) (born 2001), American soccer player
- Stuart J. Ritchie, Scottish psychologist and intelligence researcher
- Susana Ritchie (born 1944), Argentine sprinter
- Therese Ritchie (born 1961), Australian photographer
- Thomas Ritchie (journalist) (1778–1854), American journalist
- Thomas Ritchie (judge) (1777–1852), Canadian politician
- Thomas Ritchie (psychiatric survivor) (born c. 1928), Scottish Union of Mental Patients founder
- Tim Ritchie (born 1987), American long-distance runner
- Tim Ritchie (cricketer) (born 1964), New Zealand cricketer
- Todd Ritchie (born 1971), baseball player
- Tom Ritchie (born 1952), Scottish footballer
- Tommy Ritchie (1930–2017), Northern Irish footballer
- W. R. Ritchie (1876–1970), American football player and coach, professor, and civil engineer
- Wally Ritchie (born 1965), American baseball player
- Walter Ritchie (1919–1997), British sculptor
- Walter Potter Ritchie (1892–1965), Scottish soldier
- Ward Ritchie (1905–1996), American printer and author
- William E. Ritchie (1871–1943), American trick cyclist
- William Johnstone Ritchie (1813–1892), Chief Justice of Canada from 1879 to 1892
- William Ritchie (barrister) (1817–1862), British lawyer in India
- William Ritchie (editor) (1781–1831), Scottish lawyer, journalist and newspaper owner
- William Ritchie (footballer) (born 1895), Scottish footballer
- William Ritchie (moderator), Scottish minister
- William Ritchie (physicist) (1790–1837), British physicist
- William Ritchie (rugby union) (1882–1940), Scottish international rugby union player
- William Thomas Ritchie (1873–1945), Scottish cardiologist
- Willie Ritchie (1891–1975), American boxing champion
- Willie Ritchie (golfer) (1884–1966), Scottish golfer
- Willis Ritchie (1864–1931), American architect

== See also ==
- Ritchie (disambiguation)
- Ritchie (given name)
