= David Ritchie =

David or Dave Ritchie may refer to:

== Politics ==
- David Ritchie (diplomat) (born 1953), Australian diplomat
- David Ritchie (moderator) (1763–1844), moderator of the General Assembly of the Church of Scotland, 1814/15
- David Ritchie (politician) (1812–1867), Republican member of the U.S. House of Representatives

== Sports ==
- David Ritchie (cricketer) (1892–1974), English cricketer
- David Ritchie (footballer) (born 1971), former English footballer
- David "Tarzan" Ritchie (born 1945), shinty player
- Dave Ritchie (gridiron football) (1938–2024), American gridiron football coach
- Dave Ritchie (footballer) (born 1935), Australian rules footballer
- Dave Ritchie (ice hockey) (1892–1973), ice hockey player

== Others ==
- David Ritchie (surgeon) (1920–1993), British doctor
- David Edward Ritchie, chairman of Vancouver-based Ritchie Bros. Auctioneers
- David George Ritchie (1853–1903), Scottish philosopher
- David J. Ritchie (1950–2009), game designer and author
- Black Dwarf (personage) (1740–1811), born as David Ritchie, a dwarf, the inspiration for Sir Walter Scott's novel The Black Dwarf
- David Ritchie (physicist), professor of experimental physics

== See also ==
- David Richie (born 1973), American football player
