= John Ritchie =

John Ritchie may refer to:

== Sportsmen ==
- John L. Ritchie (1876–?), Scottish footballer for Queen's Park FC and Scotland
- John Ritchie (Australian footballer) (1932–2008), Australian rules footballer
- John Ritchie (footballer, born 1941) (1941–2007), English football player for Sheffield Wednesday and Stoke City
- John Ritchie (footballer, born 1944) (1944–2012), English football player
- John Ritchie (footballer, born 1947) (1947–2018), Scottish football player and manager
- John Ritchie (footballer, born 1951) (born 1951), English football player for Hereford United

== Others ==
- John Ritchie (abolitionist) (1817–1887), American abolitionist
- John Ritchie (American Civil War) (1836–1919), American Union Army officer, traveler and diarist
- John Ritchie (composer) (1921–2014), New Zealand composer
- John Ritchie (Maryland politician) (1831–1887), U.S. representative from Maryland
- John Ritchie (merchant) (c. 1745–1790), Scottish-born Canadian merchant, judge and politician
- John Ritchie (newspaper owner) (1778–1870), Scottish publisher, owner of The Scotsman
- John Ritchie, 3rd Baron Ritchie of Dundee (1902–1975), British peer and chairman of the Stock Exchange
- Sir John Neish Ritchie (1904–1977), president of the Royal Veterinary College in London
- Sid Vicious (John Simon Ritchie, 1957–1979), English musician
- John William Ritchie (1808–1890), Canadian lawyer and politician
- John Macfarlane Ritchie (1842–1912), Scottish-born New Zealand businessman

== See also ==
- Jon Ritchie (born 1974), American football player
- Johnny Ritchey (1923–2003), American baseball player
- Jack Ritchie, pen name of John George Reitci (1922–1983), American writer
