= Ritchie =

Ritchie may refer to:

== People ==
- Ritchie (given name)
- Ritchie (surname)

== Fictional characters ==
- Ritchie, in the 1986 American science fiction movie Howard the Duck
- Ritchie Tozer, on the TV series It's a Sin (TV series)
- Robert Ritchie (The West Wing), on the TV show The West Wing

== Places ==
- Ritchie, Edmonton, Alberta, Canada
- Ritchie, Illinois, US
- Ritchie, Kentucky, US
- Ritchie, South Africa
- Ritchie County, West Virginia, US
- Ritchie's Archipelago, Andaman Islands
- Fort Ritchie, Maryland, US

== Other ==
- Ritchie Bros. Auctioneers
- Baron Ritchie of Dundee

== See also ==
- Richie (film), a 2017 Indian film
- Richie, a given name and surname
- Richard, a given name
- Richard (disambiguation)
- Rich (disambiguation)
- Rishi (disambiguation)
