= Andrew Ritchie =

Andrew Ritchie may refer to:

- Andrew Ritchie (art historian) (1907–1978), Scottish-born American art historian
- Andrew Ritchie (inventor) (born 1947), founder of Brompton Bicycle Ltd
- Andy Ritchie (English footballer) (born 1960), former English football player and manager
- Andy Ritchie (Scottish footballer) (born 1956), former Scottish football player
- Andrew Ritchie (British Army officer) (born 1953), director of Goodenough College, former Commandant of the Royal Military Academy Sandhurst
- Andy Ritchie (swimmer) (born 1958), former Canadian swimmer
- Andrew Ritchie, cycling historian associated with Major Taylor
- Andrew Jackson Ritchie (1868–1948), Georgia State representative, in the US
- Andrew Ritchie (priest) (1880–1956), Anglican priest

== See also ==
- Andrew (disambiguation)
