= Rishi (disambiguation) =

A rishi in Indian religions is an accomplished and enlightened poet of Vedic hymns.

Rishi may also refer to:

== Hinduism ==
- Rishi Panchami, day of worship
- Rishi Bhrigu or Maharishi Bhirgu, one of the seven great sages
- Rishi Jahnu, appears in the story of Ganga and Bhagiratha
- Rishi Marichi or Marichi, the son of Brahma, the cosmic creator
- Rishi Yamdagni or Jamadagni, one of the Saptarishis
- Rishi Durvasa or Durvasa is an ancient sage, son of Atri and Anasuya

== People ==
- Rishi (given name)
  - Rishi Sunak, former Prime Minister of the United Kingdom
- Rishi (surname)
- Rishi (Kannada actor), Indian film actor who works in Kannada cinema
- Rishi (Tamil actor), Tamil film actor
- Rishi Rich, a British Indian music producer

== Places ==
- Rishi Ganga, a river, springing from the Rishi Glacier in Uttarakhand, India
- Rishi Pahar, a Himalayan mountain peak in Uttarakhand, India
- Rishi, Iran, a village

=== Facilities and structures ===
- Rishi Valley School, a boarding school in India

=== Fictional locations ===
- Rishi (Star Wars), a fictional planet in the Star Wars franchise

== Film ==
- Rishi (2001 film), a 2001 Indian Tamil film
- Rishi (2005 film), a 2005 Indian Kannada film
- Rishi Arya, fictional R&AW agent in the 2023 Indian film Pathaan, portrayed by Viraf Patel

== Other uses ==
- Rishi coffin, an Egyptian type of coffins, covered with feathers

== See also ==
- Rishika (disambiguation)
- Richard (disambiguation)
- Ritchie (disambiguation)
- Rich (disambiguation)
- Richie
