= A Narrative of the Travels and Adventures of Paul Aermont Among the Planets =

1873 science fiction novel

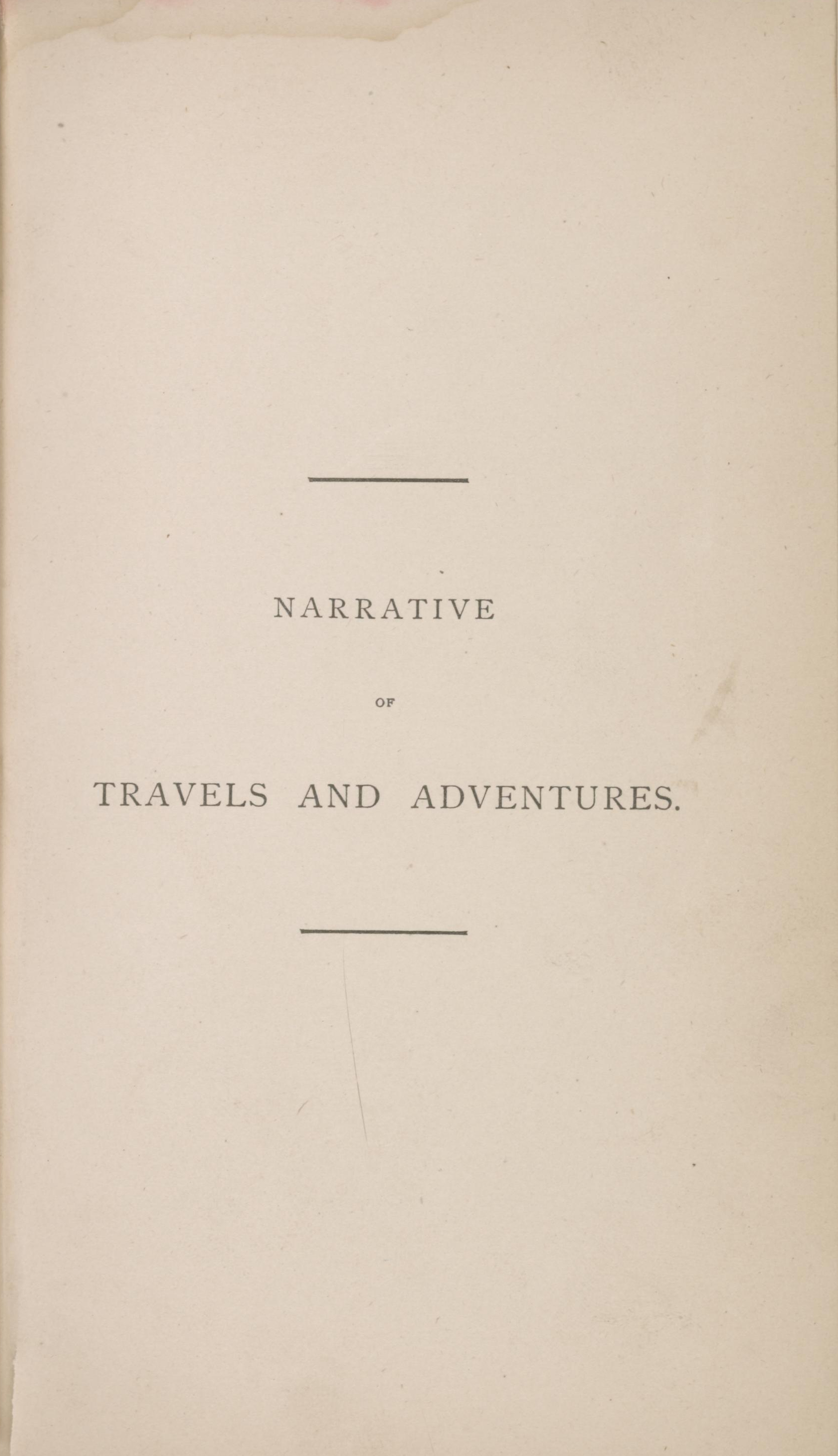
- Front page
- Author: (pseudonymous)
- Language: English
- Genre: Science fiction
- Publisher: Rand, Avery & Company
- Publication date: 1873
- Publication place: United States
- Pages: 192 (original); 136 (2018 paperback)
- ISBN: 978-1-60543-952-5 (2018 paperback)
- LC Class: PS1006.A64 N37

A Narrative of the Travels and Adventures of Paul Aermont among the Planets is an 1873 science fiction novel published under the pseudonym "Paul Aermont", the story's fictional main character who travels the Solar System in a balloon. After its initial publication, the book largely fell into obscurity and did not see a reprint until 2018. It belongs to the utopian fiction tradition of portraying more advanced societies on other planets.

== Synopsis ==
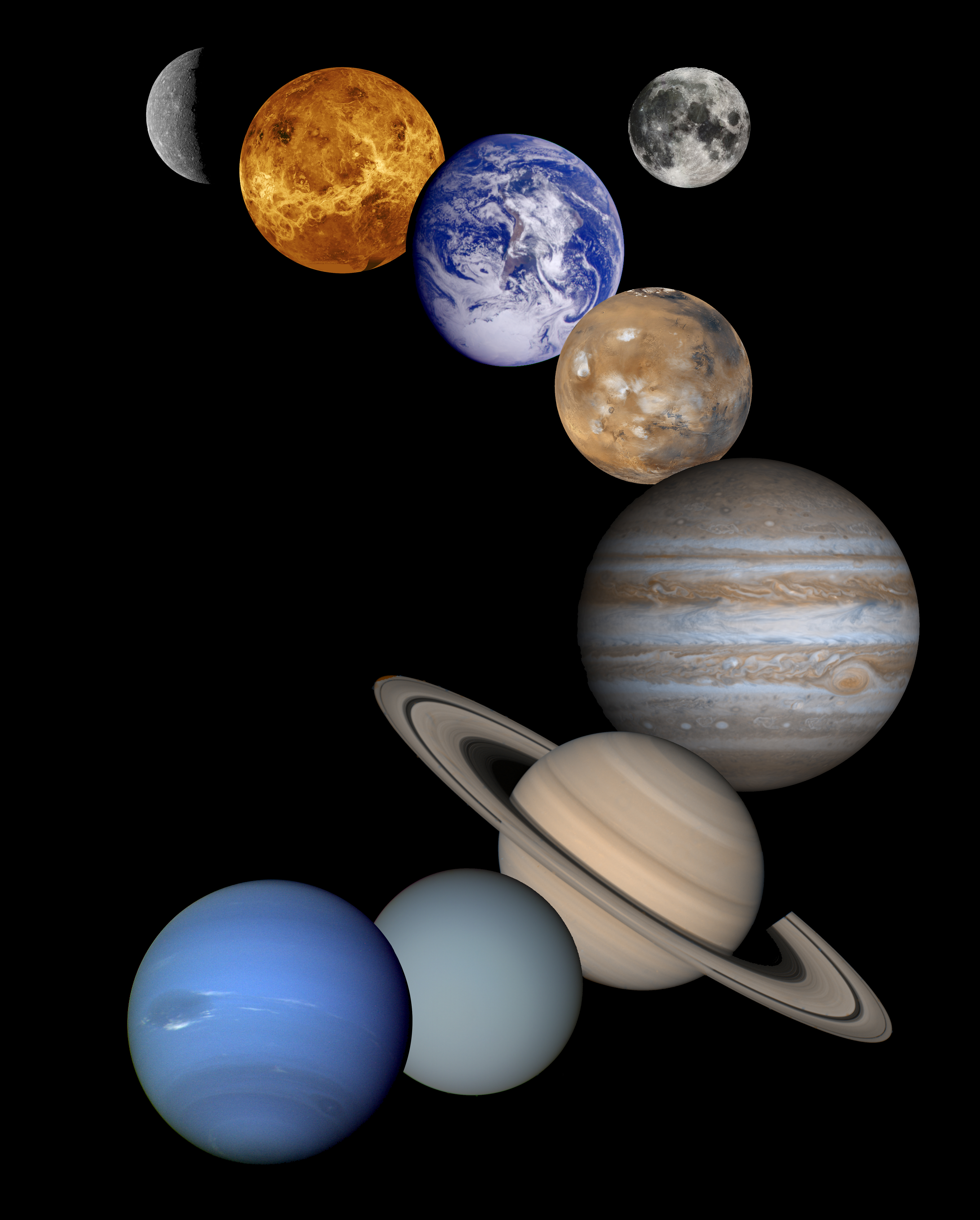
The narrative visits various locations in the Solar System. Clicking on a planet leads to the article about its depiction in fiction.

In 1819, Paul Aermont constructs a balloon and ventures into outer space. His first stop is Jupiter, which turns out to be a planet very similar to Earth and inhabited by humans. The Jovian civilization is however far more advanced than Earth's, including having developed heavier-than-air aircraft. He leaves for Earth but loses control of his balloon and ends up on Venus instead. There Aermont finds two races of Venusians, one gentle and matriarchal and the other primitive and violent. From Venus he travels to Mars, which is both culturally and technologically on the same level as Earth, albeit with better urban planning. Finally, Aermont goes to Saturn, where he meets a woman named Stella, whom he marries. The Saturnian society is divided into castes, the architecture is characterized by palaces and parks, and automobiles are ubiquitous. Aermont eventually returns to Earth after Stella dies, where he discovers that although he has not aged, 50 years have passed in his absence.

== Publication history ==
The book was originally published in 1873 by Rand, Avery & Company in Boston, Massachusetts, under the pseudonym "Paul Aermont". Only one edition was printed, though an illustrated second one was planned. E. F. Bleiler, in the 1990 reference work Science-Fiction: The Early Years, writes that the identity of the author is unknown, but that it is "presumably an American author". A copy of the book identified as the author's copy bears the signature "Benjamin F. Field", and several sources including The Encyclopedia of Science Fiction attribute the book to Benjamin F. Field (1806–1887), a Boston merchant.

The book was reprinted in paperback format by Ramble House in 2018.

== Reception and analysis ==
E. F. Bleiler writes in Science-Fiction: The Early Years that the novel's placement in the history of science fiction "is somewhat surprising; one might have expected the story to have been written a generation or so earlier". Bleiler further comments that the book does not appear to have any kind of message to convey, rather serving as pure entertainment. On the book's literary merits, Bleiler writes that it is "a curious literary survival", finding it "pleasant enough to read, but not outstanding in any way". Nathaniel Robert Walker, writing in 2020, notes that the story portrays the planets as more advanced the further from the Sun they are, and that this advancement correlates with an increasing amount of greenery and a more suburban setting. On the book's contemporary reception, Walker states that "Few apparently took notice of Paul Aermont's interplanetary adventures". Writing in The Encyclopedia of Science Fiction, John Clute identifies the book as belonging to the literary tradition of using an interplanetary voyage to portray utopian societies.

== See also ==
- Solar System in fiction
- Other fictional tours of the Solar System:
  - Aleriel, or A Voyage to Other Worlds (1883), by W. S. Lach-Szyrma
  - A Journey in Other Worlds (1894), by John Jacob Astor IV
  - A Honeymoon in Space (1901), by George Griffith
