= Henry Ritchie (disambiguation) =

Henry Ritchie was a recipient of the Victoria Cross.

Henry Ritchie may also refer to:

- Harry Ritchie, journalist
- Harry Ritchie (footballer), Scottish footballer
