= Mark Ritchie (trader) =

American commodities trader (born 1956)

Mark Andrew Ritchie is an American stock trader active in Chicago Board of Trade and Chicago Mercantile Exchange commodities trading. A twenty-year veteran of the financial industry, Mark is one of the original founding partners of Chicago Research and Trading (CRT) (the other, his brother Joe Ritchie), which was once the largest options firm in the industry. He and his brother, Joe, are members of Jack Schwager's elite group known as "Market Wizards." He is also the author of five books, God in the Pits and Spirit of the Rainforest.

== Education ==
- B.A. Trinity International University, 1973
- M-Div Trinity International University, 1980

== Early life and career ==
Mark grew up in the poverty of Afghanistan, the Jim Crow South (Texas, before during and after Rosa Parks), and an Oregon coast logging town.{God in the Pits}

Mark was at one point a theology student (M-Div, 1980, TEDS) and also worked as a night-shift prison guard before he became one of the founding members of C.R.T.

He was featured by BusinessWeek in a November 3, 1986 article titled These Traders Made All-Star By Hitting Singles.

Mark is a contributor to Zondervan's "Men's Devotional Bible," alongside figures such as Tom Landry, Billy Graham, Charles Colson, and others.

== Personal ==
Mark Ritchie has 5 children and 13 grandchildren.

== Philanthropy ==
Mark is a member of Board of Directors of Warm Blankets Orphan Care International and Southern Evangelical Seminary and Bible College. He is a former board member of the Christian Action Council (Care Net) and World Vision.

Mark has traveled extensively throughout the third world as an amateur anthropologist with a special interest in the poor.

== Published works ==
- Ritchie, Mark Andrew (2005). God In the Pits: The Enron-Jihad Edition. VMI Publishing. ISBN 0-9747190-8-0.
- Ritchie, Mark Andrew (2000). Spirit of the Rainforest: A Yanomamo Shaman's Story. Island Lake Press. ISBN 0-9646952-3-5.
- Ritchie, Mark Andrew (2014). My trading Bible: Lose your shirt. Save your life. Keep trading. Island Lake Press. ISBN 978-0-9646952-0-7.

== See also ==
- Joe Ritchie
