= Elizabeth Horrell =

New Zealand teacher and homemaker

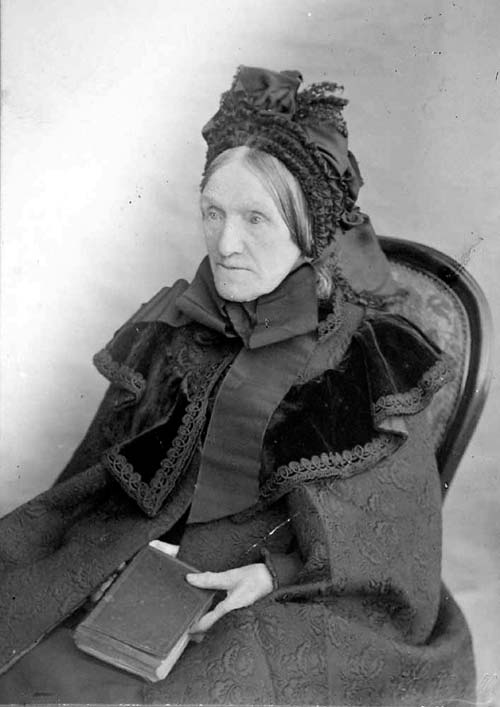
Elizabeth Horrell, 1900

Elizabeth Horrell (21 April 1826 – 18 January 1913) was a New Zealand teacher and homemaker.

== Biography ==
She was born in Topsham, Devonshire, England on 21 April 1826. Horrell and her husband emigrated to New Zealand on the Charlotte Jane in September 1850, in the first group of settlers. Horrell was Canterbury's first female schoolteacher, teaching in Lyttelton from 1850.
