= Rishika =

Rishika in Indo-Aryan languages – and especially within the context of Hindu religious texts – may refer to different things:

- A female rishi, an inspired poet of Vedic hymns
- Rishikas, a possibly-mythical tribe of Central Asia and South Asia, which is mentioned in historical and religious texts
  - Rishika kingdom, an ancient kingdom inhabited by the Rishikas

== See also ==
- Rishi (disambiguation)
- Vṛścika, a month in the Indian calendar
