= Rishi (given name) =

Rishi is a given name. Notable people with this name include:

- Rishi Bachan (born 1986), West Indies cricketer
- Rishi Bhat (born 1986), American child actor and internet entrepreneur
- Rishi Devkota (died 1981), Nepalese communist leader
- Danko Jones (musician) (Rishi James Ganjoo), Canadian rock musician, singer and composer
- Rishi Kapoor (1952–2020), Indian Bollywood actor, film producer and director
- Rishi Kumaar (1975–2018), Singaporean actor, musician, lyricist
- Rishi Prakash Tyagi, senior police officer in India
- Rishi Ram (born 1952), Fijian civil servant and former diplomat of Indian descent
- Rishi Reddi, American author
- Rishi Rich or Rishpal Singh, British Indian music producer
- Rishi Shah (born 1986), American billionaire, founder of Outcome Health
- Rishi Shankar (1934–2015), Fiji Indian lawyer
- Rishi Sunak (born 1980), British politician, former Prime Minister of the United Kingdom

== See also ==
- Rishi (surname)
- Rishi (disambiguation)
