= Charlotte Jane =

Ship of the Canterbury Association

History
- Name: Charlotte Jane
- Route: Gravesend, England to Lyttelton Harbour, New Zealand
- Builder: Pattersons, Bristol
- Launched: 17 April 1848

General characteristics
- Tons burthen: 730 tons bm
- Length: 131 ft 8 in (40.13 m)
- Beam: 32 ft 4 in (9.86 m)
- Depth: 21 ft 8 in (6.60 m)
- Sail plan: Full-rigged ship

Charlotte Jane was one of the First Four Ships in 1850 to carry emigrants from England to the new colony of Canterbury in New Zealand.

== Maiden voyage ==
The Charlotte Jane departed from England in 1848, bound for Sydney. Captain Alexander Lawrence set sail with his wife, Miriam Lawrence, their baby daughter, a teenage nursemaid, a surgeon and 264 emigrants. After Australia, they sailed to Hong Kong, Singapore, Bombay, Whampoa (Canton), before returning via Cape Town to London.

== Second voyage: Passage from England to New Zealand ==
Under the command of Captain Alexander Lawrence, the Charlotte Jane left Plymouth Sound at midnight, Saturday, 7 September 1850. She sighted Stewart Island on Wednesday, 11 December 1850, and dropped her anchor in Port Victoria (Lyttelton Harbour) on Monday, 16 December 1850, at 10 o'clock in the morning. Her passage was 99 days from port to port or 93 days from land to land. She carried 26 chief cabin, 24 intermediate, and 104 steerage passengers including a chaplain and a surgeon. There were one birth, one marriage and three deaths during the voyage. All the deaths were very young children, with one even dying before the ship departed Plymouth and was buried on shore there.

=== Arrival in Lyttelton ===
The First Four ships together carried an estimated 790 passengers. In addition, about another 60 worked their passage on the ships or deserted and disembarked. The first of the vessels to arrive was Charlotte Jane in Lyttelton on 16 December 1850 in the morning. Charlotte Jane carried the equipment for the production of the region's first newspaper, the Lyttelton Times, which was first published less than one month after the ship's arrival.

Charlotte Jane departed Port Victoria (Lyttelton) on 7 January 1851 bound for Sydney with two passengers.

The ship is remembered in the name of a road, Charlotte Jane Quay, in the port town of Lyttelton.

=== Passengers ===
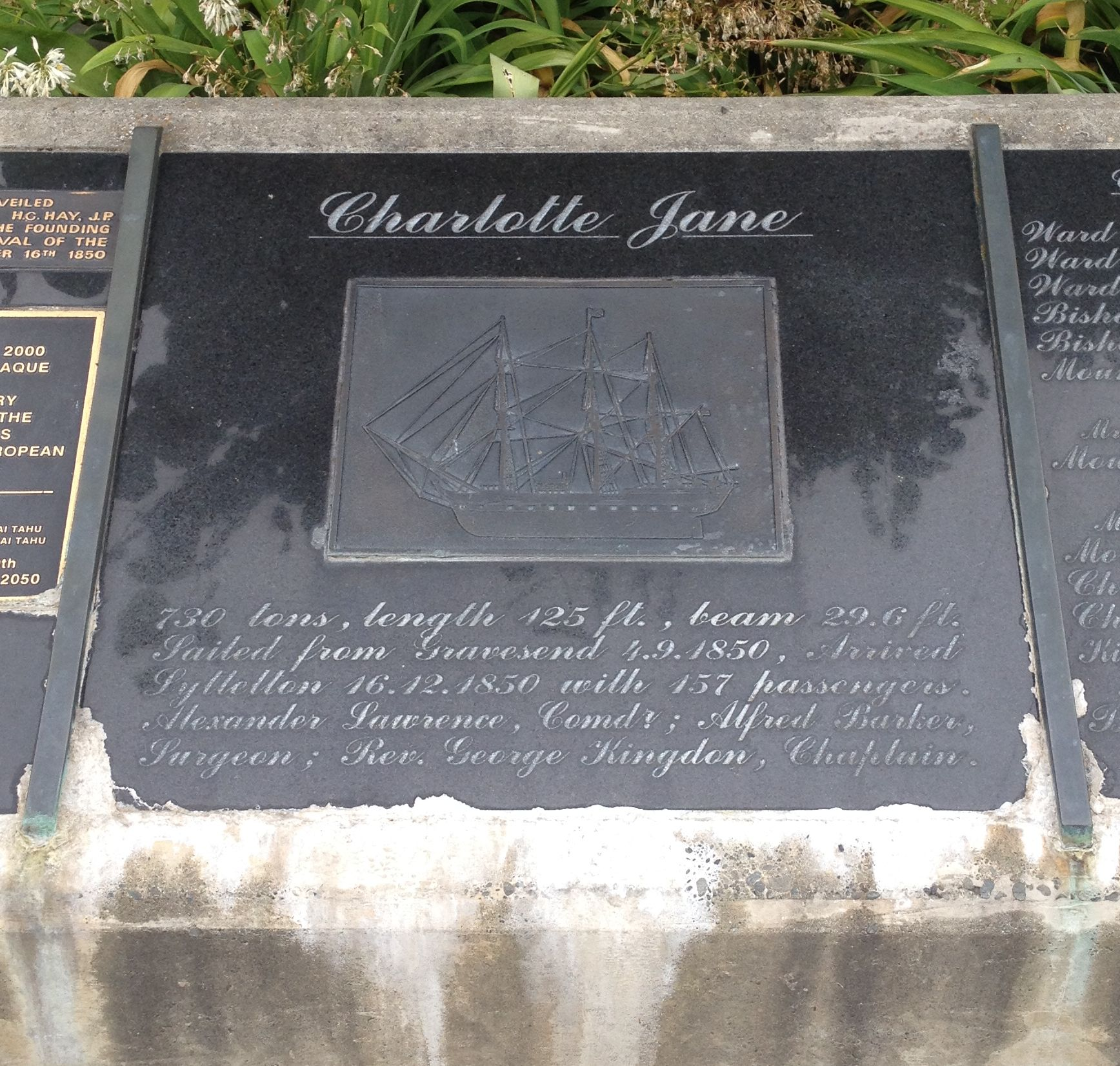
Marble plaques in Cathedral Square

Charlotte Jane carried approximately 154 passengers. Exact numbers are not known because the surgeons' lists and the shipping lists do not match, and some young children were not counted.

The passengers aboard these four ships were referred to as "the Pilgrims". Their names are inscribed on marble plaques in Cathedral Square in the centre of Christchurch, where 157 passengers are listed.

==== Notable passengers ====
The first passenger who leapt onto the shore was James FitzGerald, who became an important politician in New Zealand. One of Charlotte Jane's most notable passengers was the architect Benjamin Mountfort. Charles Bowen was later Speaker of the New Zealand Legislative Council. James Stuart-Wortley was a member of the 1st New Zealand Parliament before he returned to England in 1855. James Temple Fisher was elected to Parliament in 1876. Edward Bishop was the 6th Mayor of Christchurch. Harriet Ritchie became the first nurse at Lyttelton Hospital. Alfred Barker was the surgeon on the voyage. He was Canterbury's first doctor and is remembered for his photography. Elizabeth Horrell taught on the ship on the voyage out and was appointed schoolteacher in Lyttelton on her arrival there, becoming Canterbury's first female schoolteacher.
