= Richie =

Richie or Richy is a masculine given name or short form (hypocorism) of Richard. It is also a surname. Notable people with the name include:

== Given name ==
- Richie Anderson (born 1987), British broadcaster
- Richie Ashburn (1927–1997), American Major League Baseball player, member of the Hall of Fame
- Richie Beirach (1947–2026), American jazz pianist and composer
- Richie Benaud (1930–2015), Australian cricketer and commentator
- Richie Blackmore (born 1969), New Zealand rugby league coach and former player
- Richie Byrne (born 1981), Irish footballer
- Richie Cunningham (born 1970), American former National Football League placekicker
- Richie Emselle (1917–1992), Australian rules footballer
- Richie Fitzpatrick (1871–1904), American mobster
- Richie Grant (disambiguation), multiple people
- Richie Havens (1941–2013), American singer-songwriter and guitarist
- Richie Hebner (born 1947), American former Major League Baseball player
- Richie Incognito (born 1983), American National Football League player
- Richie James (born 1995), American football player
- Richie Jen (任賢齊) (born 1966), Taiwanese singer
- Richie Lucas (born 1938), American former football quarterback, member of the College Football Hall of Fame
- Richie McCaw (born 1980), New Zealand former rugby union player, the most capped test rugby player of all time
- Richie McDonald (born 1962), American country music singer and former lead singer of the band Lonestar
- Richy Müller (born 1955), German actor born Hans-Jürgen Müller
- Richie Murray (born 1982), Irish hurler
- Richie Narvaez (born 1965), American writer
- Richy Peña (born 1984), Dominican-born American music producer
- Richie Power (disambiguation), multiple people
- Ricardo Álvarez Puig (born 1984), Spanish footballer known as Richy
- Richie Ryan (born 1985), Irish footballer
- Richie Ryan (1929-2019), Irish former politician
- Richie Sambora (born 1959), American rock guitarist, producer, singer and songwriter; former lead guitarist of Bon Jovi
- Richie Scheinblum (1942–2021), American Major League Baseball All Star outfielder
- Richie Williams (born 1987), American basketball player
- Richie Woodhall (born 1968), British former boxer, WBC super middleweight titleholder
- Richie Zisk (born 1949), American baseball player

== Surname ==
- David Richie (born 1973), American former National Football League player
- Donald Richie (1924–2013), American author specializing in Japanese culture
- Ladale Richie (born 1989), Jamaican footballer
- Lionel Richie (born 1949), American singer, songwriter, musician, record producer, and actor
- Nicole Richie (born 1981), American actress, daughter of Lionel Richie
- Shane Richie (born 1964), English actor, comedian, singer, and presenter
- Sofia Richie (born 1998), American fashion model, daughter of Lionel Richie

== Fictional characters ==
- Richie Cunningham from Happy Days
- Richie Foley, aka Gear, a character from Static Shock
- Richie Jerimovich, a main character on The Bear TV series
- Richie Rich, the main character of the comics, TV show, and film of the same name, and Harvey Girls Forever!
- Richie Ryan, from Highlander
- Richie Tozier, from the horror novel It

== See also ==
- Ritchie (given name), includes a list of people with given name or surname Ritchie
- Ritchie (surname), includes a list of people with surname Ritchie
- Rishi (given name)
