= Rishi (surname) =

Rishi (Hindi: ऋषि, Telugu: ఋషి) is a surname. Notable people with the surname include:

- Adil Reshi (1989), Indian first-class cricketer
- Manu Rishi (1971), Indian actor, lyricist, script and dialogue writer who works in Hindi films
- Mukesh Rishi (1956), Indian actor and film producer
- Nirmal Rishi (born 1943), Indian Punjabi film and television actress
- Nund Rishi (c. 1377 – c. 1438), Kashmiri Sufi saint, mystic, poet and Islamic preacher
- Rajesh Rishi (1964), Indian politician
- Ravi Rishi (1955–2016), non-resident Indian businessman
- Richard Rishi (born 1977), Indian actor who has appeared in South Indian films
- Vineeta Rishi (1981), English actress
- Weer Rajendra Rishi (1917–2002), Indian linguist, diplomatic translator, and Romani studies scholar

== See also ==
- Rishi (given name)
- Rishi (disambiguation)
