= Chicago Research and Trading Group =

Defunct futures and options trading firm

- Formerly: Chicago Board Crushers
- Company type: Private partnership
- Industry: Financial services, derivatives trading
- Founded: 1977; 49 years ago
- Founder: Joe Ritchie, Mark Ritchie, Gary Ginter
- Defunct: 1993 (acquired)
- Fate: Acquired by NationsBank
- Headquarters: Chicago, Illinois, United States
- Key people: Joe Ritchie (principal), Rick Smith (manager under NationsBank)
- Products: Options and futures market-making, government securities dealing
- Number of employees: ~750 (at time of sale)

The Chicago Research and Trading Group (CRT) was an American options and futures trading firm headquartered in Chicago. Founded in 1977 as Chicago Board Crushers by Joe Ritchie, his brother Mark Ritchie, and Gary Ginter, the firm was a pioneer in computer-driven quantitative trading strategies and became one of the largest options market makers in the world during the 1980s.In 1993, NationsBank (later part of Bank of America) acquired CRT for $225 million in cash.
