= Harriet Ritchie =

New Zealand matron and dressmaker (1821–1907)

Harriott Ritchie
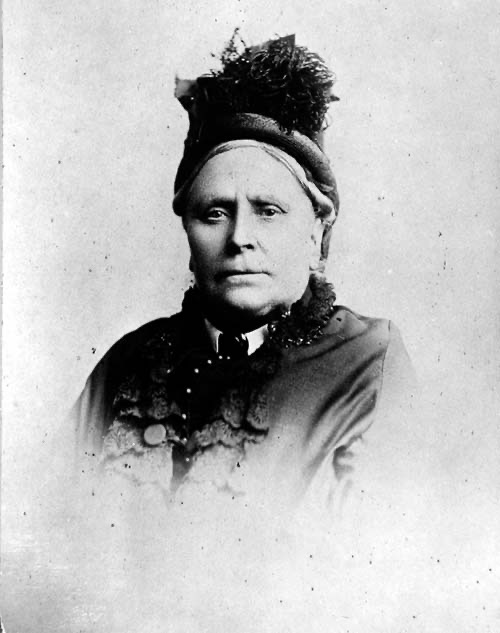
- Born: Harriott Maria Overton; 1821 or 1822
- Died: 30 September 1907 (aged 85–86); Christchurch, New Zealand

Harriet Maria Simpson (née Overton, and later Ritchie, 1821 or 1822 – 30 September 1907) was a New Zealand hospital matron, servants’ home matron and dressmaker.

== Biography ==
Simpson was born to Thomas Overton and his wife (name unknown) in England in about 1821. By the age of 20, she had married blacksmith Joseph Simpson (on Christmas Eve 1839) and had a daughter (Elizabeth, born 1841 or 1842). In 1850, the family emigrated to Lyttelton, New Zealand on the Charlotte Jane.

The Simpsons were initially employed by Charles Bowen; however, they soon left the Bowens and obtained work in the town of Lyttelton as they could earn higher wages there. Simpson became the sole nurse at Lyttelton Hospital in 1856, and Joseph found work in the town. He later travelled to the first Australian gold rush but did not return, and probably died in Victoria.

During Simpson's tenure at Lyttelton Hospital, the population of the town increased significantly and the hospital was frequently overcrowded. She dealt with local patients as well as patients from ships in port, and was responsible for all patient care, meals, and cleaning, with the assistance of only one servant.

In 1859, Simpson took charge of a family of five children who had arrived on the Clontarf; their mother and two of their siblings had died on the voyage, and their mother had given birth to a stillborn baby. Their father, James Berry, died soon after arrival in Lyttelton, and the children were permitted to stay at the hospital with Simpson. When she left the hospital in 1862, on her marriage to Captain David Ritchie, the Berry children moved with her to their new home.

In 1864, Simpson was appointed matron of the Christchurch Female Home. The Home had been established by the visiting Maria Rye and the Female Middle Class Emigration Society, which aimed to recruit women in England to go to the colonies as governesses, arrange their passages and find them positions on arrival. However, there was concern for the ongoing well-being of these women as they had no family in the colonies. Therefore, the Female Home played a key role in providing a safe home for them during periods of unemployment or convalescence, and also served as an employment bureau for local families seeking to hire a governess.

During the first year of operating the home, Simpson registered 190 employers, and 320 women were employed. The following year, 218 women stayed at the home and 288 servants were employed, although over 540 families had applied to hire them. The home was moved to a new location and expanded to accommodate invalid servants from rural areas.

Simpson left her position at the home in 1867 and set up a dressmaking business in 1877. Her husband was lost at sea during a voyage from Lyttelton to Wellington; however, it is not known when this happened. She died on 30 September 1907.
