= John Ritchie (American Civil War) =

American Union Army officer (1836–1919)

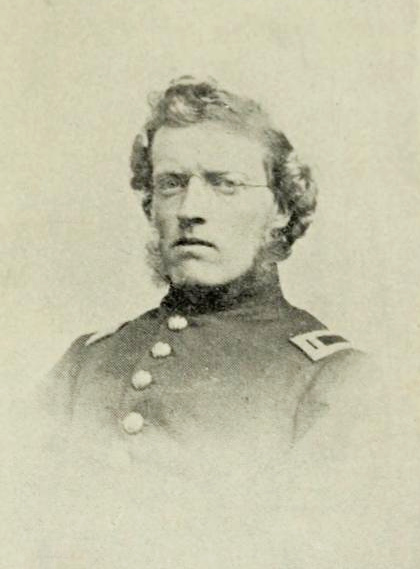
John Ritchie, c. 1863-1865

John Ritchie (August 4, 1836 – July 12, 1919) was an American Union Army officer, traveler and diarist. He served in the 54th Regiment Massachusetts Volunteer Infantry during the American Civil War.

== Family ==
The son of Uriah Ritchie and Susan White Rand, John Ritchie was born in the Old North End, Boston and graduated from Harvard University in 1861. In 1866, Ritchie married his cousin, Caroline Poole, daughter of Amos Poole and Caroline C. Rand, also of Massachusetts. Caroline Poole's maternal uncles were George C. Rand, who established in Boston the publishing house of Rand, Avery & Company; William Rand, who was one of the founding members of Rand, McNally & Company; and Franklin Rand, publisher of the Zion's Herald. John Ritchie and Caroline Stuart Poole resided in Boston, Massachusetts. On January 5, 1867, a year after they were married, Caroline Stuart Poole died. Nine years later, in 1876, John Ritchie would marry Rosa Gertrud Schoepffer, daughter of Hector Schoepffer of Dresden, Germany. The couple were married in Dresden on June 29, 1876. From 1879 to 1886 Ritchie and Schoepffer lived in Winthrop, Massachusetts, in the "old Bartlett estate." The couple had no children.

== Education ==
John Ritchie attended the Fleet Street Primary School and the Eliot Grammar School, both in Boston. In 1850 he entered the English High School of Boston, one of the first public high schools in America. Two years later, in 1852, he dropped out of his studies to work for his uncle, George C. Rand, at his publishing house in Boston. He would work under his uncle's tutelage for two years, before returning to complete his high school studies in 1854. He prepared for college at the Public Latin School prior to entering Harvard University in 1857. In 1859, while a student at Harvard, Ritchie undertook a walking tour of over 300 miles with classmate Wendell Phillips Garrison, visiting western Massachusetts and Connecticut, into the Hudson River Valley and ending in the Catskills. Ritchie would graduate in Harvard's Class of 1861.

== Military ==
On January 1, 1863, President Abraham Lincoln’s Emancipation Proclamation took effect freeing enslaved people in all states then in rebellion. The act officially allowed black men to enlist in the Army. Soon after, Massachusetts Governor, John A. Andrew, asked for permission from the Secretary of War, Edwin Stanton, to raise a regiment of black troops. When Col. Edward Hallowell, Harvard classmate of John Ritchie, began his recruitment efforts for the Massachusetts Colored Volunteer Infantry, John Ritchie was one of the first to sign up. Ritchie served as a 1st Lieutenant of the 54th Regiment Massachusetts Volunteer Infantry during the US Civil War.

He is listed in the appendix of Brave, Black Regiment as Quartermaster: Regimental And Company Officers, 54TH Massachusetts Infantry Regiment (COLORED)

Colonel Robert Gould Shaw
Colonel Edward N. Hallowell
Lieutenant Colonel Norwood P. Hallowell
Surgeon Lincoln R. Stone
Assistant Surgeon Charles P. Bridgham
Adjutant Garth W. James
Quartermaster John Ritchie

John Ritchie would serve for two years, and keep a detailed diary of his time spent with the 54th Infantry unit, including departing from Boston on the transport De Molay for the coast of South Carolina. At Morris Island, South Carolina, on July 16, 1863, the Fifty-fourth Regiment saw action for the first time on James Island, losing forty-five men. Two days later, on July 18, 1863, the regiment led the attack against Fort Wagner on Morris Island. Despite heavy losses, the unit showed great bravery, never retreating.

Ritchie resigned from his post on 20 Jun 1865, due to the illness of his father, who subsequently died in October of that year.

== Travels ==
John Ritchie was an avid traveler. In 1861, Ritchie spent 40 days as a deck hand on the sailing vessel the Sicilian, which was headed for the Mediterranean. Due to seasickness, he was forced to debark in Trieste, Italy. He traveled through Switzerland to England, returning to Boston in 1862. After his military service, Ritchie toured Connecticut and New Hampshire by boat, traversing over 200 miles of river in 1867. The following year he again made a similar trip by boat, this time starting at Lake Memphremagog, in Vermont, and traveling via small streams to Brunswick, VT, through to Providence RI, and then took the boat back by rail to Boston, for a round trip of over 700 miles. In 1869 he traveled again to Europe, this time to Germany and Austria, where he went to study the German language. He went on to Ireland, England and Switzerland, returning to America in 1870. In 1874, a return trip to Switzerland found Ritchie able to obtain one of his goals - to summit Mont Blanc. In 1875, Ritchie again returned to Europe, where he toured Russia, Turkey and Greece. It was during this trip, in 1876 while in Germany, that he met and married Rosa Gertrud Schoeppfer. Later in his life he would make many return trips to Germany with his wife, where he bicycled through Saxony, Bavaria, the Harz and Thuringia. He also ventured farther abroad to the continent of Africa, to Tunis and Algiers.

== Affiliations ==
John Ritchie was a member of: The Institute of 1770 - Harvard, Phi Beta Kappa - Harvard, The Boston Committee of 100 (1884), The National Civil Service Reform League, the Boston Civil Service Reform Association, the Citizen's Association of Boston, the New England Tariff Reform League, the Massachusetts Reform Club, the New England Meteorological Society, the Bostonian Society, the Boston Athletic Association, the League of American Wheelmen and the Massachusetts Cremation Society. Later in life his affiliations also included: the Anti-Imperial League, the Boston Scientific Society and he was a fellow of the American Academy.
