= Arthur David Ritchie =

British chemical physiologist and philosopher (1891-1967)

Arthur David Ritchie FRSE (22 June 1891 – 12 March 1967) was a British chemical physiologist and philosopher.

== Life ==
He was born Oxford on 22 June 1891 the son of Prof David George Ritchie. The family moved to St Andrews in 1894 when his father was given a new professorship there.

Ritchie was educated at Fettes College, then studied Science at the University of St Andrews and Philosophy at Trinity College, Cambridge. Qualified as a chemist, he served as an official chemist in the Royal Naval Air Service (looking at gas for airships) in World War I.

He was elected a fellow of Trinity College, Cambridge with a dissertation on scientific method, but shortly afterwards moved to the University of Manchester, where he was appointed lecturer in biological chemistry in 1922 and lecturer in physiological chemistry in 1924. From 1937 to 1945 he held the Sir Samuel Hall chair as Professor of Philosophy at Manchester University. In 1945 he moved to the University of Edinburgh as Professor of Logic and Metaphysics.

In 1946 he was elected a Fellow of the Royal Society of Edinburgh. His proposers were Sir Alexander Gray, James Pickering Kendall, Douglas Guthrie and Sir Edmund Taylor Whittaker.

He retired in 1960 and died on 12 March 1967.

== Family ==
In 1921 he married Katharine Victoria Ponsonby.

== Works ==
- Scientific method: an inquiry into the character and validity of natural laws, 1923. The International Library of Psychology, Philosophy and Scientific Method.
- The comparative physiology of muscular tissue 1928
- The natural history of mind, 1936
- Civilization, science and religion, 1945
- Science and politics, 1947
- Essays in philosophy, and other pieces, 1948
- Reflections on the philosophy of Sir Arthur Eddington 1948
- British philosophers, 1950
- George Berkeley's Siris, the philosophy of the great chain of being and the alchemical theory, 1954
- Studies in the history and methods of the sciences, 1958
- George Berkeley, a reappraisal, 1967
