= Rishi Prakash Tyagi =

Former Assistant Commissioner in Delhi Police

Rishi Prakash Tyagi is a former Assistant Commissioner in Delhi Police. He was reported to be the first senior police officer in India to be given the death sentence for the custodial death of a person, although the punishment was later reduced after an appeal in a higher court.

In August 1987, when Tyagi was the station house officer (SHO) of Vivek Vihar police station in East Delhi, Mohinder Kumar and Ram Kumar were arrested on charges of eve teasing and subsequent assault on a police constable who had gone to arrest them. Both were reportedly tortured and a day later were found dumped in nearby fields. While Mohinder died in hospital, Ram Kumar survived and was a crucial witness during the trial.

The trial court, while sentencing Tyagi on 18 December 2006, said the charges of murder were proved and it was one of the 'rarest of rare cases' that merited death penalty.

The sentence was appealed in the Delhi High Court and in March 2008 Tyagi was convicted only for culpable homicide, as the intention to murder was not proved and his death sentence was commuted to eight years of 'rigorous imprisonment' with a fine of two lakhs rupees.
