= Henry Ritchie =

First World War Victoria Cross recipient (1876–1958)

Captain Henry Ritchie VC
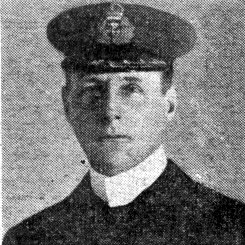
- Henry Peel Ritchie VC
- Born: 29 January 1876; Edinburgh, Scotland
- Died: 9 December 1958 (aged 82); Edinburgh
- Burial place: Warriston Crematorium, Edinburgh
- Military career
- Allegiance: United Kingdom
- Branch: Royal Navy
- Service years: 1890 – 1917
- Rank: Captain
- Units: HMS Goliath
- Conflicts: World War I: Raid on Dar-es-Salaam (WIA)
- Awards: Victoria Cross

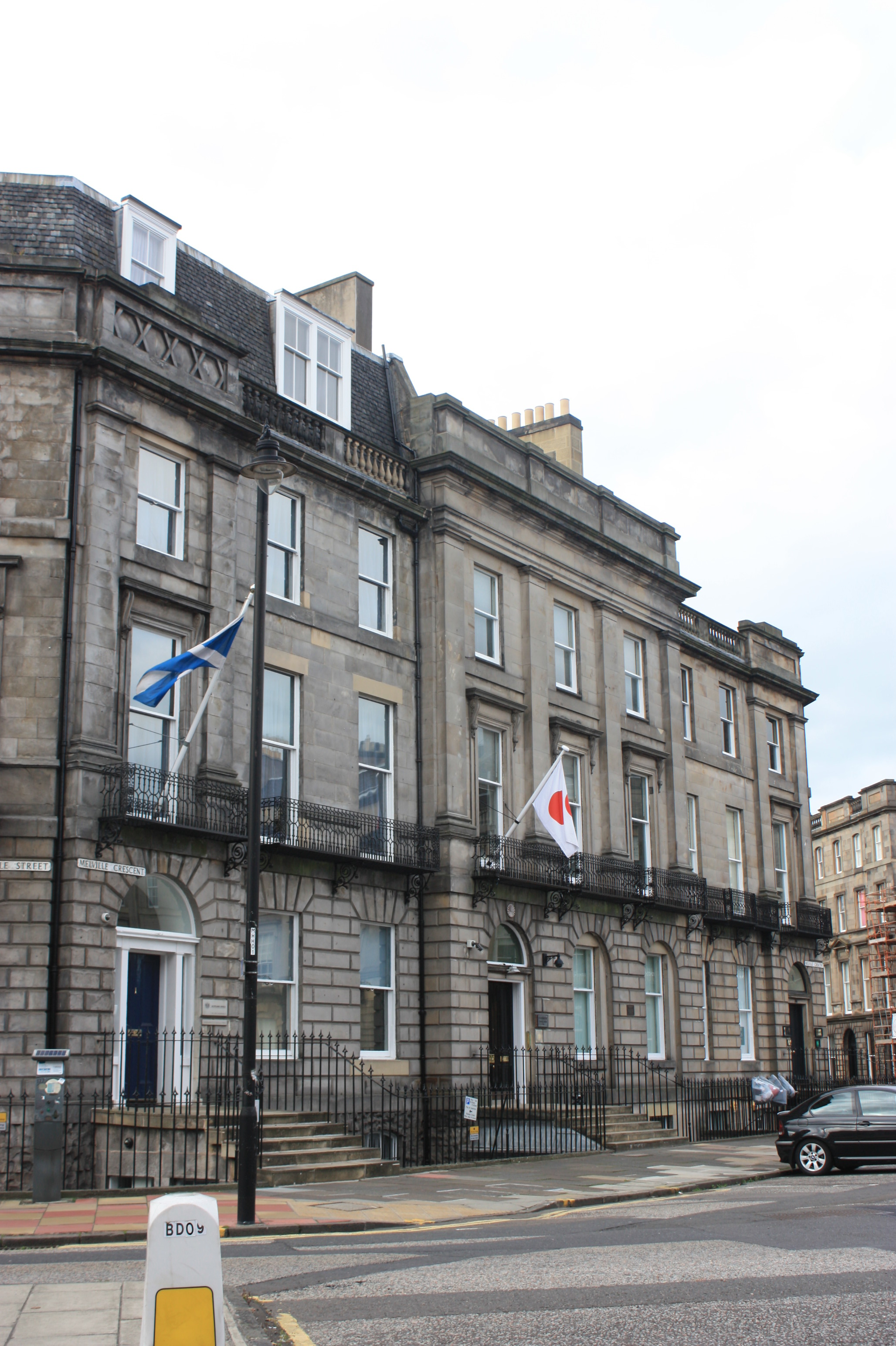
1 Melville Crescent, Edinburgh (closest building)

Henry Peel Ritchie VC (29 January 1876 – 9 December 1958) was a recipient of the Victoria Cross, the highest and most prestigious award for valour "in the face of the enemy" that can be given to members of the British and Commonwealth armed forces. Ritchie received the first VC awarded to naval personnel during the First World War for his actions during a raid on the German colonial harbour of Dar-es-Salaam in November 1914, which left him seriously wounded.

Despite the courage of his actions during the raid, Ritchie was not initially recommended for the Victoria Cross. Delayed by discussion at the Admiralty concerning the correct medal to award, it was not until 24 April 1915, nearly six months later, that the medal was presented. Ritchie never fully recovered from his wounds and was forced into early retirement the following year. Although he lived another 41 years, he never again served at sea.

== Early career ==
Born in Edinburgh to Mary Ritchie (née Anderson) and Dr Robert Peel Ritchie, he spent his youth at 1 Melville Crescent in Edinburgh's exclusive West End.

Henry was educated at George Watson's Boys' College and Blairlodge School before he enrolled on the training ship HMS Prince of Wales at the age of fourteen, in 1890. Rapidly rising in the navy due to keen intelligence and impressive strength, Ritchie was promoted to lieutenant six years later, and served for the next fifteen years as a junior staff officer at Sheerness Gunnery School. In 1900 Ritchie became the armed forces lightweight boxing champion, and was the runner-up in the same contest the following year. In July 1902 he was posted to the battleship HMS Sans Pareil, docked in the Medway as part of the Reserve squadron.

Whilst stationed at Sheerness, he met and married Christiana Lilian Jardine, with whom he had two daughters.

His shore service ended in March 1911, when he was posted as senior lieutenant to the pre-dreadnought battleship HMS Goliath. Promoted to commander later that year, he managed the ship's gunnery exercises and procedures while Goliath was part of the Channel Fleet stationed in British waters. It was said by one of his junior officers that "Ritchie had the reputation of being very strict, but I always found him most fair".

== War service ==
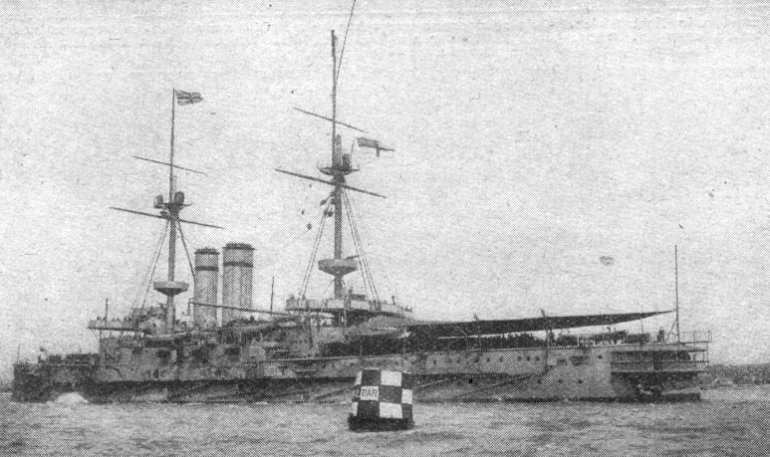
HMS Goliath

At the outbreak of World War I, Goliath was ordered to the Indian Ocean to lead a blockade of the German colony of German East Africa, and specifically its main port at Dar-es-Salaam. It was feared by the Admiralty that the German navy would use its colonial ports to support commerce raiding cruisers such as SMS Emden (1906) or Königsberg, both of which were known to be operating in the Indian Ocean at that time. This concern was amplified because Königsberg, blockaded in the delta of the Rufiji River, had operated from Dar-es-Salaam in the early months of the war and had sunk the British cruiser HMS Pegasus on a raid from the port. Remaining in Dar-es-Salaam's large natural harbour were the German cargo ships Konig and Feldmarschall, the hospital ship Tabora and several smaller coastal vessels – all of which could conceivably be used to resupply the trapped cruiser should they leave port.

Despite a declaration from the German Governor Heinrich Schnee that neither the harbour nor its ships would be used for military purposes, the decision was taken by British Admiral Herbert King-Hall that the shipping in the port must nevertheless be neutralised. The Germans had pre-emptively scuttled a blockship in the port's entrance channel, with the intention of preventing Goliath and the other heavy British warships from entering the harbour to shell the undefended city. With close-range bombardment impossible, the British assembled assault teams with volunteers from the small blockading flotilla. Their mission was to augment the existing blockage by immobilising or sinking those cargo ships trapped in the port, thus denying its use to the Germans as well. Command of the assault was given to Commander Ritchie as the second most senior officer present, and he commandeered two small auxiliary gunboats, Dupleix and Helmuth, to carry his raiding parties.

=== Raid on Dar-es-Salaam ===
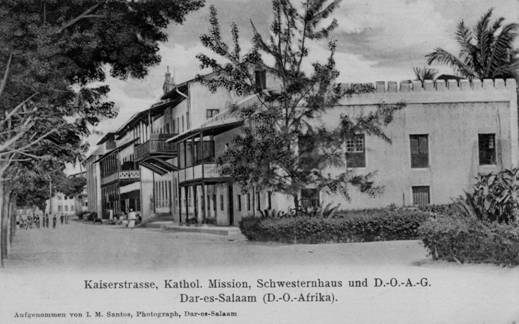
Kaiserstrasse in 1905. This was the main street of the city, and was very badly damaged by naval bombardment during and after the raid.

The day prior to the raid the decision was taken that, in order to allow the Germans time to evacuate the target ships and minimise casualties, they would be warned of the British intentions. In a brief parley the German defenders requested that the British conduct their operations under a white flag, which request was denied. Ritchie was informed that he could begin his assault on the following morning of 28 November 1914.

Due to a breakdown aboard Dupleix before it reached the harbour, Ritchie had to begin his assault with only Helmuth and a handful of small boats and launches from the blockading ships. There were no signs of life on the target ships as Ritchie's flotilla moved uncontested into the port, and the shoreline was described by officers in the raiding party as "utterly deserted" and "cool and inviting". Shortly after 10:00 the raiders laid explosive charges on the abandoned Konig and Feldmarschall. However they were then challenged by the port's commanding officer, who questioned their right to be in the anchorage and demanded to be permitted to observe their actions in order that he could make a report. In a meeting aboard Helmuth it was explained to him that British orders were to disable German assets in the harbour and that, being at war, his permission was unnecessary.

After some discussion he was persuaded to disembark so that Helmuth could continue operations. Leaving demolition parties aboard the cargo vessels, Ritchie then took Helmuth further downriver to check for other shipping, but the small ship grounded on a sandbar. Assuming the route was blocked, he returned to the two cargo ships on one of the expedition's small launches. It was at this stage, whilst conducting a final inspection, that he made the discovery of a large number of empty ammunition cases and discarded bullets in the holds of the cargo ships. Deducing that the German crew had armed themselves before they left their vessels, he suspected preparations were underway to ambush his force when it attempted to leave the harbour.

Despite this discovery Ritchie resolved to continue as ordered. He took the precaution of sending Helmuth to the harbour entrance to cover the withdrawal, and gathered together several small boats moored in the harbour. These he secured around his launch, providing added buoyancy in case it received fatal damage in the engagement he was sure would ensue. With preparations complete, one of Ritchie's boats (from the cruiser HMS Fox) moved to the harbour entrance. There it was met with a hail of fire from the shore, where the hidden German crews and town garrison had lain in wait. Helmuth was also attacked, but despite sustaining severe damage both craft were able to limp to safety, carrying several wounded. From outside the harbour Fox and Goliath responded with a heavy barrage, demolishing several streets in the town, including the Governor's Palace. Ritchie, aboard the only remaining British boat in the harbour, attempted to pick up one of his officers who had earlier gone aboard the German hospital ship Tabora to conduct a medical inspection. This effort was unsuccessful, and on leaving the harbour Ritchie's launch came under sustained fire from machine guns, rifles and light artillery.

With most of his crew wounded, Ritchie refused to relinquish his place at the helm until he had steered his boat to safety. He was discovered "simply smothered in blood and barely conscious" by Goliath's crew when they went to his aid in the battleship's pinnace. Ritchie was rushed to the sick bay, where it was ascertained that he had been hit in eight separate places. The raid had cost the British one dead, fourteen seriously wounded and twelve captured after they were left behind in the confusion. The raiders had in turn immobilised three large merchant vessels and destroyed several shore installations, as well as taking thirty five prisoners.

Two days later, with the wounded hospitalised in Zanzibar, Goliath and Fox returned to Dar-es-Salaam and reduced most of the seafront to rubble, setting fire to several other districts of the town as well. This reprisal served only to turn the hitherto neutral local populace against the British. Feelings ran high in both camps following the raid, with the British claiming that white flags flying from several shore installations should have prevented any German attack, and the Germans insisting that the British had attempted to capture their merchant vessels' crews despite promises not to do so. According to Stephen Snelling in The Naval VCs, both sides had entered the operation with the intention of breaching the predetermined agreements.

== Retirement and the Victoria Cross ==
Ten were honoured for their role in the operation, seven receiving Distinguished Service Medals, two the Conspicuous Gallantry Medal and one, the grievously wounded Ritchie, the Victoria Cross. Ritchie had not initially been recommended for this award; the recommendation being submitted at a later date by an unidentified figure in the Admiralty. Snelling speculates that the Admiralty's change of heart was possibly a morale-boosting measure, although Ritchie's courage during the action was never called into question. The shrapnel and bullet wounds he sustained in the raid were extensive, including injuries to his forehead, left thumb, left arm (twice), right arm, right hip and a badly broken right leg after being hit by two large-calibre machine gun bullets.

Ritchie spent six weeks in hospital in Zanzibar before he was considered well enough to be transported home. In England he recovered during the spring of 1915 at Plymouth Hospital, with his family present. Although judged fit in late February, Ritchie was assigned light duties and was not returned to Goliath; a disappointment which proved fortunate for him when she was sunk off the Dardanelles in May 1915 by the Turkish destroyer Muavenet with the loss of five hundred lives. His Victoria Cross was presented by King George V at Buckingham Palace in April 1915. Promoted acting captain, he retired in 1917 having been deemed unfit for further service as a legacy of the wounds he had received.

Following his retirement Ritchie settled with his family back in his home city of Edinburgh, and lived a quiet and uneventful retirement. He was not involved in any official capacity during the Second World War, and died at his home in 1958. Ritchie was cremated at Warriston.

Memorial outside birthplace, 1 Melville Crescent, Edinburgh.

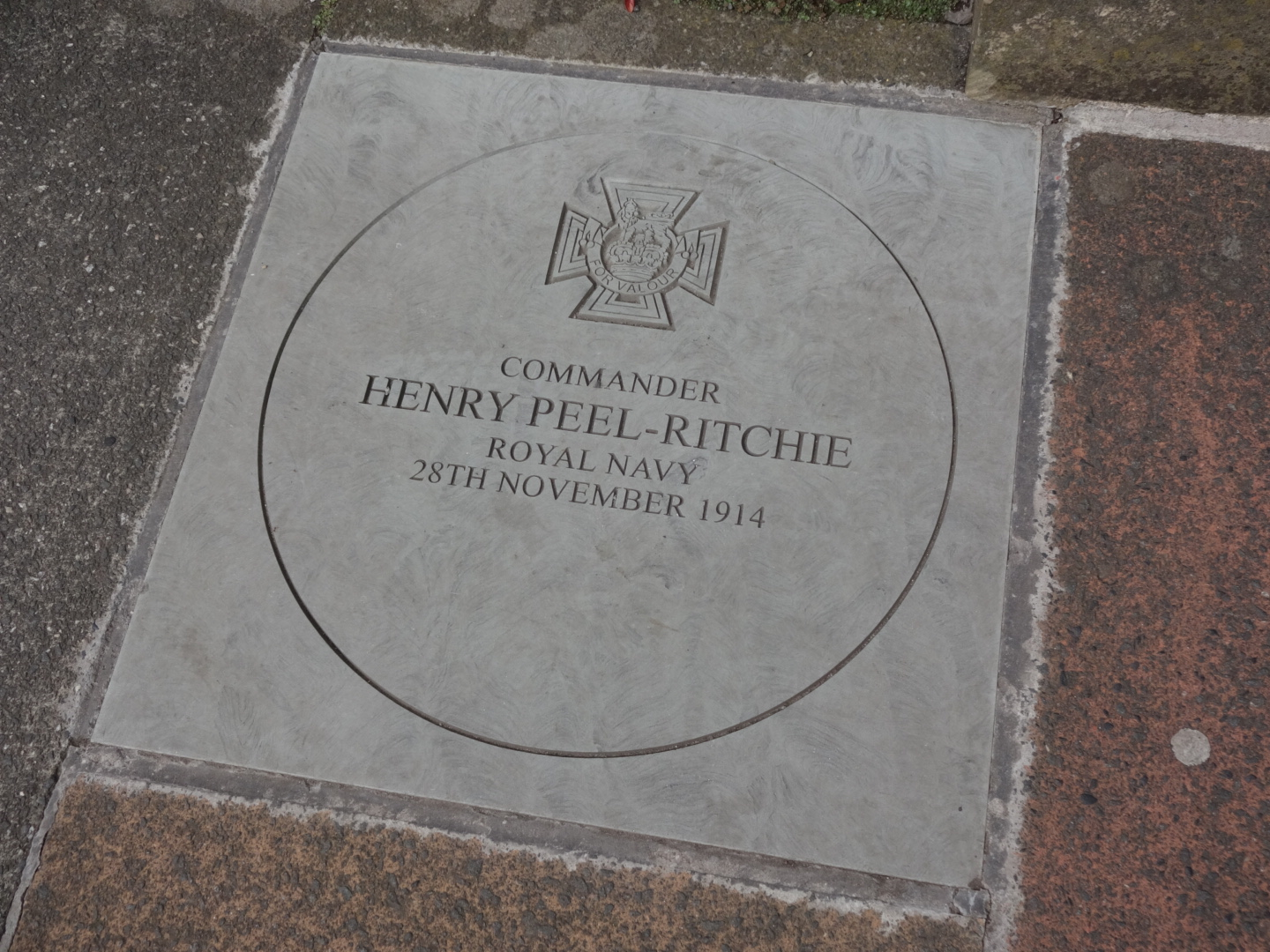
Memorial pavement slab outside 1 Melville Crescent, Edinburgh

Birthplace

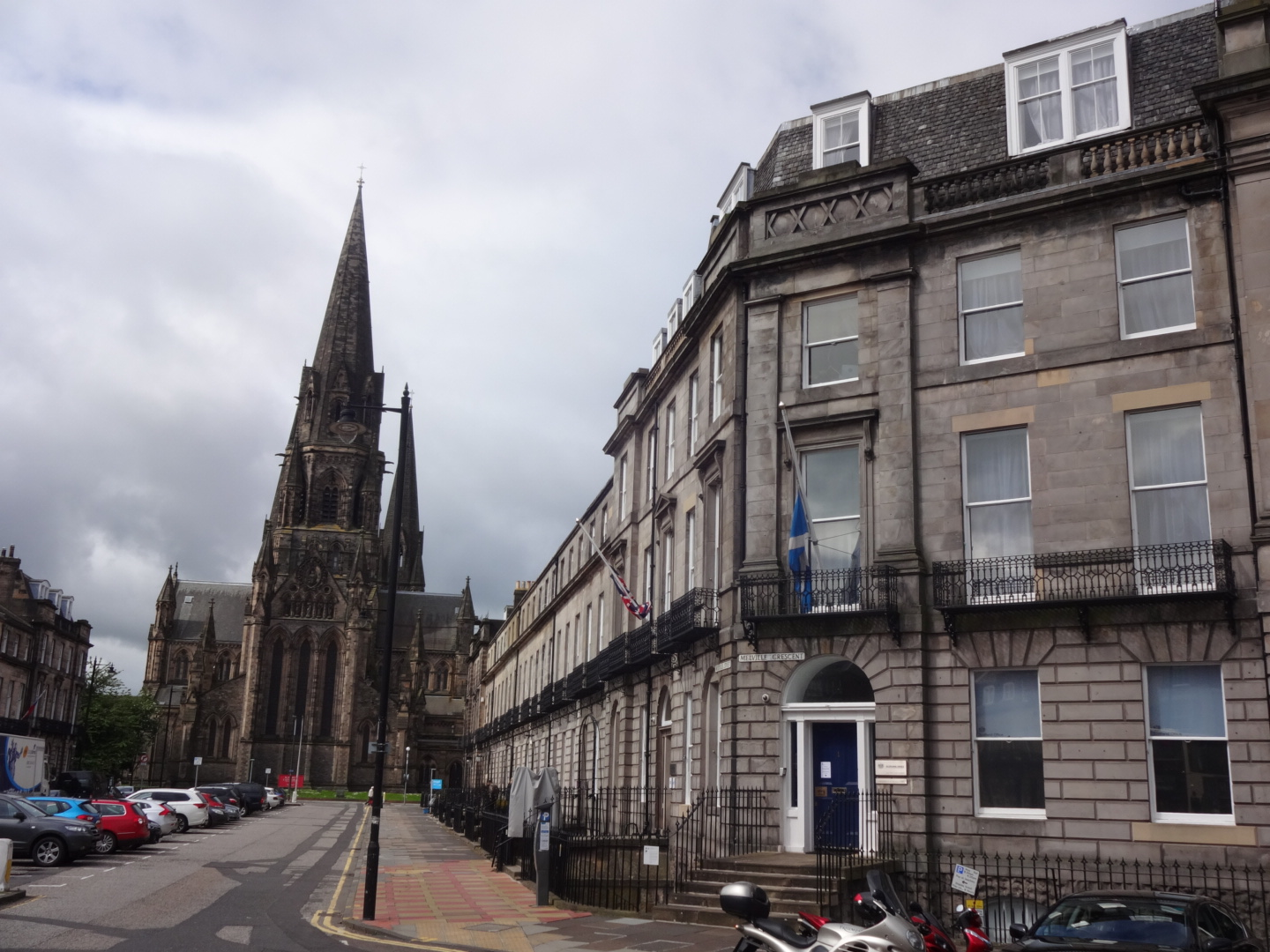
1 Mellville Crescent, Edinburgh

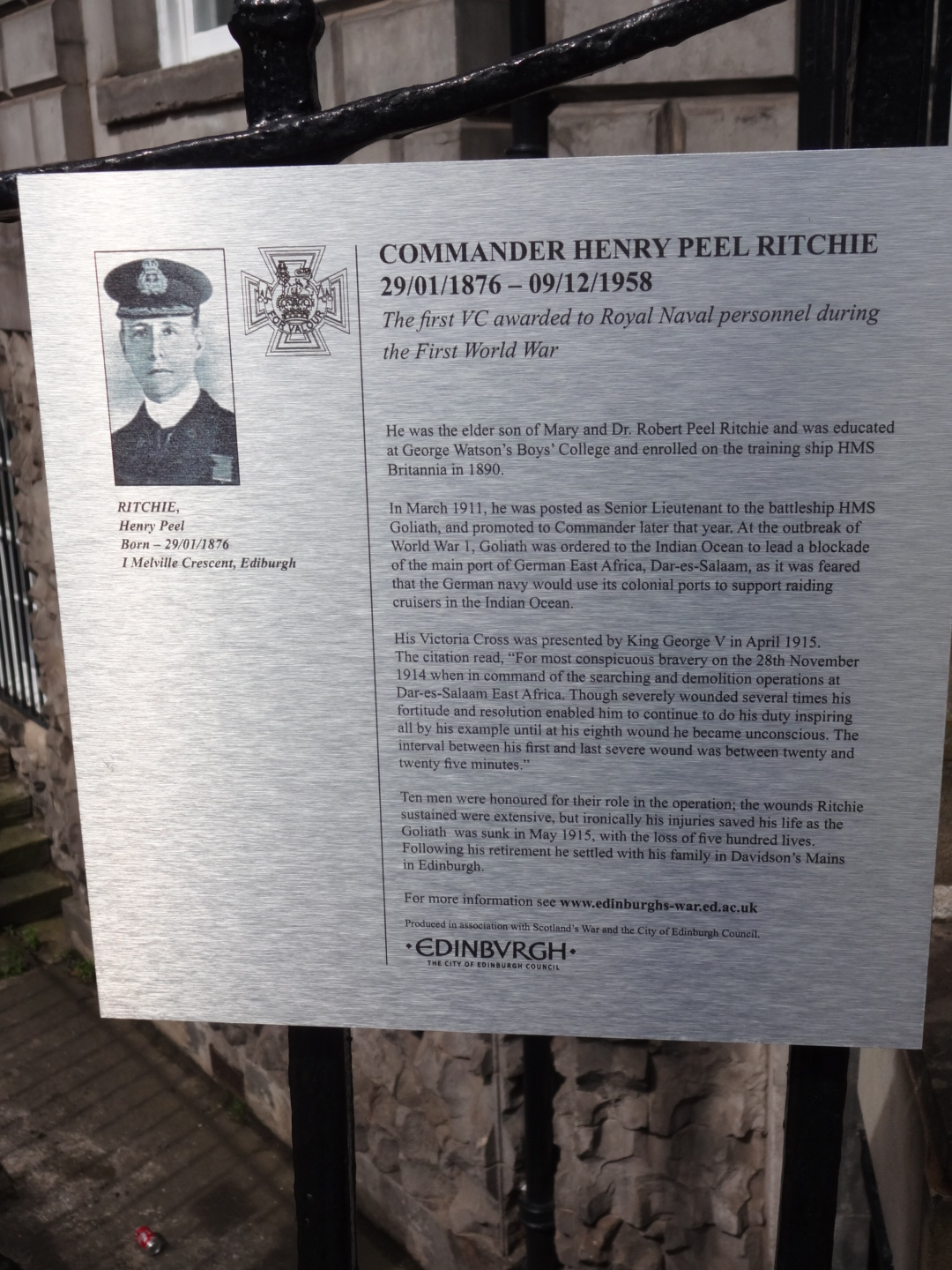
Memorial Plaque

=== Victoria Cross citation ===
Admiralty 10th April 1915

The King has been graciously pleased to approve of the grant of the Victoria Cross to Commander Henry Peel Ritchie Royal Navy for the conscious act of bravery specified below -

For most conspicuous bravery on the 28th November 1914 when in command of the searching and demolition operations at Dar-es-Salaam East Africa Though severely wounded several times his fortitude and resolution enabled him to continue to do his duty inspiring all by his example until at his eighth wound he became unconscious The interval between his first and last severe wound was between twenty and twenty five minutes

Supplement to The London Gazette, 10 April 1915
