= George Ritchie (moderator) =

Scottish minister and moderator (1808–1888)

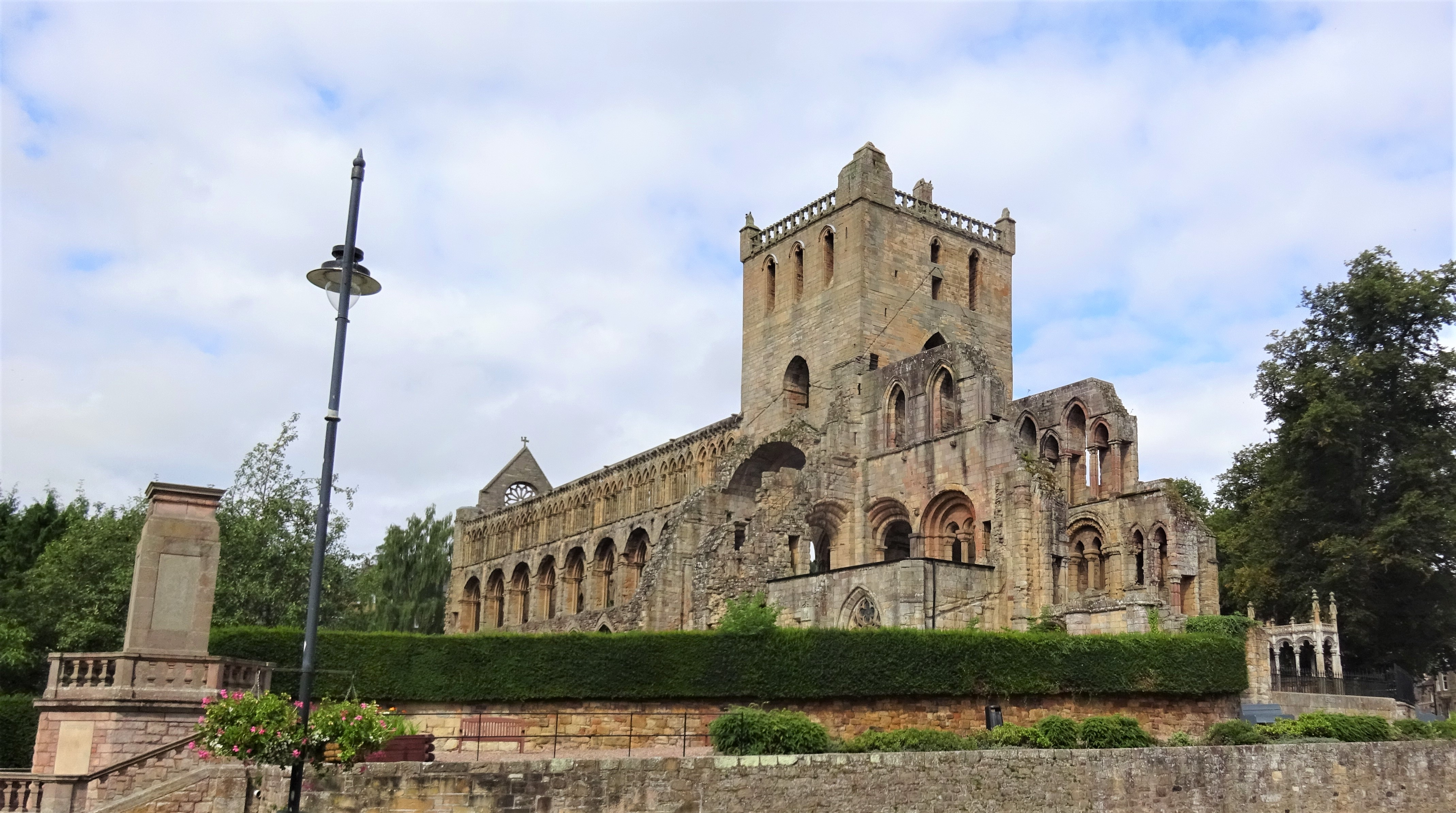
Jedburgh Abbey church used as Jedburgh Parish Church until 1875

George Ritchie (1808–1888) was a minister of the Church of Scotland, who served as Moderator of the General Assembly in 1870.

== Life ==
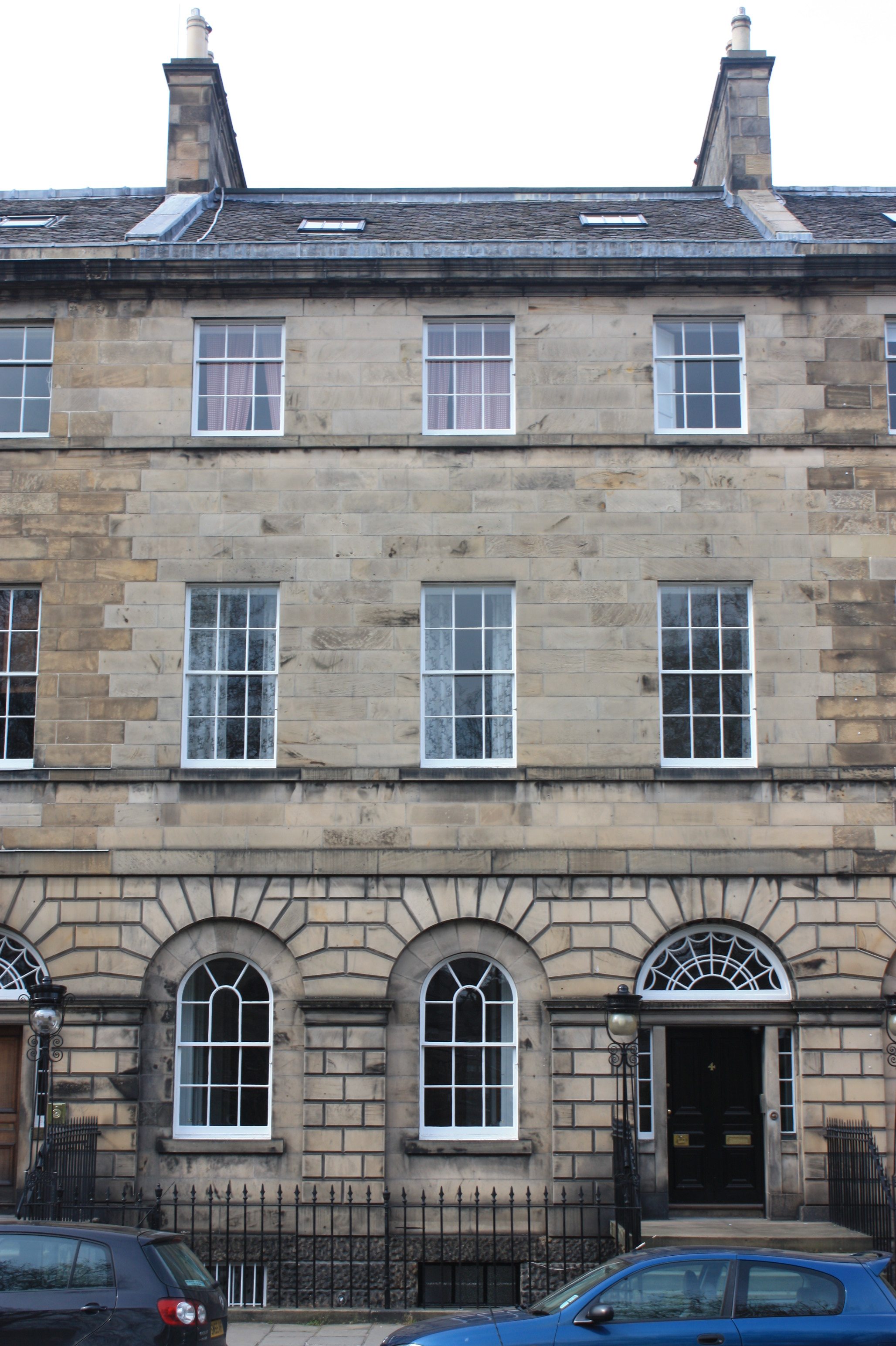
4 Charlotte Square, Edinburgh

He was born in the manse of Tarbolton in Ayrshire on 22 September 1808 the son of Rev John Ritchie, the local minister. He was educated locally then studied at the University of Glasgow graduating with an MA in 1827. He was licensed to preach by the Presbytery of Jedburgh in February 1832.

In August 1834 he was ordained as minister of St Boswells. In September 1843 he was moved to the high status charge of Jedburgh to replace Rev John Puves who had left in the Disruption of 1843. The University of Edinburgh granted him an honorary Doctor of Divinity in 1870.

In 1870 he succeeded the Rev Norman Macleod as Moderator of the General Assembly of the Church of Scotland the highest position in the Scottish Church. He was succeeded in turn by Rev Robert Horne Stevenson.

He retired in November 1876 and moved to Edinburgh living in a Georgian townhouse at 4 Charlotte Square.

He died at Charlotte Square on 29 May 1888. He was buried in Dean Cemetery.

== Family ==
In March 1845 Ritchie married Elizabeth Bradfute Dudgeon, daughter of John Dudgeon of Almondhill, Kirkliston. Their children included:

- Margaret Elizabeth Ritchie (1846–1925) married Rev Thomas Rogers of Fraserburgh and on being widowed married Robert Tenison Braithwaite.
- David George Ritchie (1853–1903)
- Elizabeth Christian Ritchie (b.1856) married Rev Dr David Scott of Dalziel
