= Plymouth Hospital =

Former hospital in Boston, Massachusetts, United States

Plymouth Hospital and Nurses Training School was a medical facility operated by and for African Americans in the South End of Boston, from 1908 to 1928. Founded by Dr. Cornelius Garland, it was located at 12 East Springfield Street, in a four-story brownstone.
