= Robert Peel Ritchie =

Scottish physician (1835–1902)

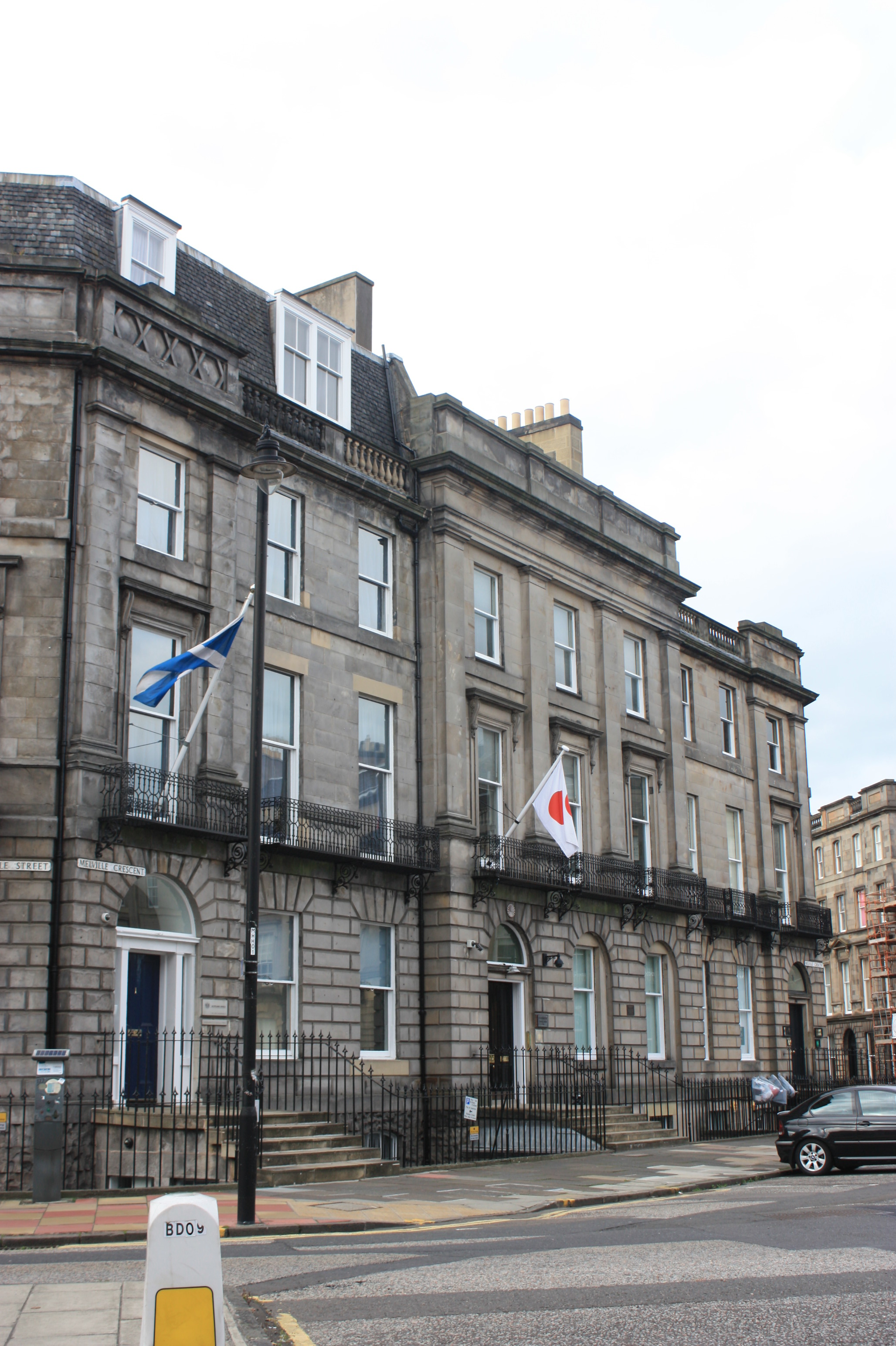
Ritchie's house at 1 Melville Crescent, Edinburgh (left)

Dr Robert Peel Ritchie MD FRSE PRCPE (1835-1902) was a Scottish physician and medical historian.

== Life ==
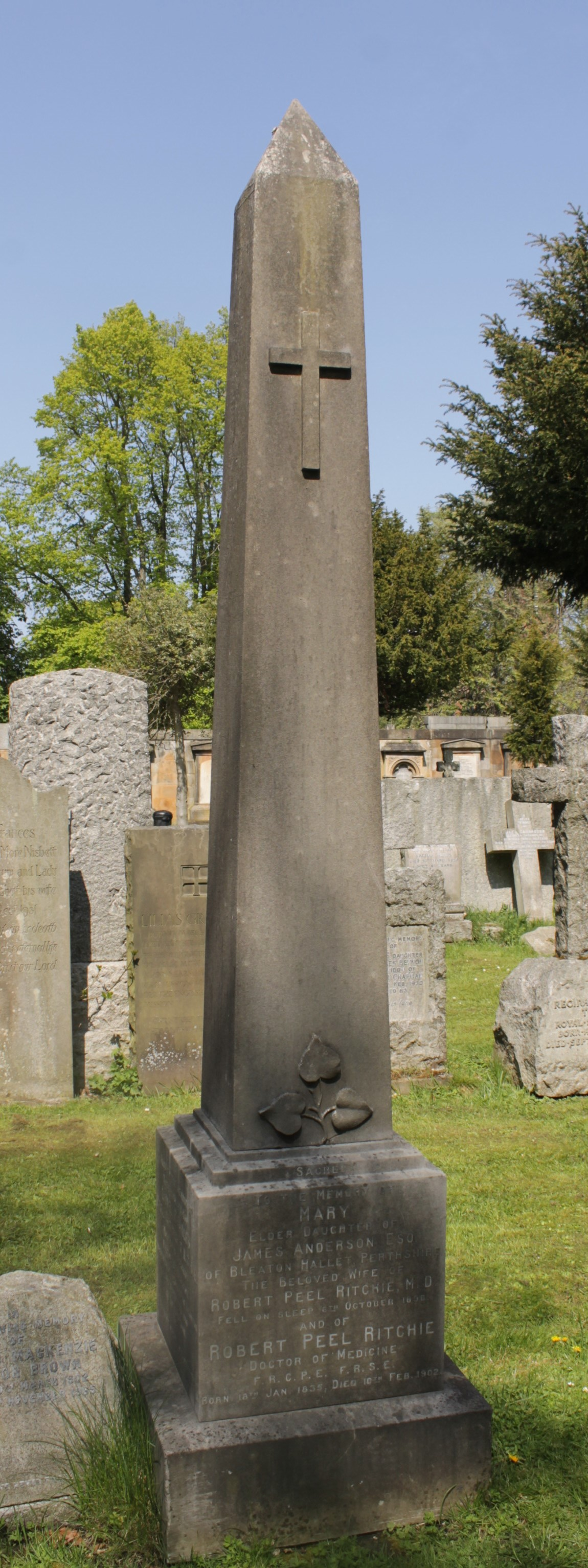
The grave of Robert Peel Ritchie MD, Dean Cemetery

He was born on 18 January 1835. He studied medicine at Edinburgh University.

In the 1860s he was living at 16 Hill Street in the First New Town in Edinburgh.

In 1866 he was elected a member of the Harveian Society of Edinburgh and served as president in 1896. In 1883 he was elected a Fellow of the Royal Society of Edinburgh. His proposers were Thomas Graham Balfour, Alexander Crum Brown, John Hutton Balfour and Isaac Anderson Henry. From 1887 to 1889 he was President of the Royal College of Physicians of Edinburgh. He was also a member of the Scottish Microscopical Society. In 1887 he was elected a member of the Aesculapian Club.

He lived at 1 Melville Crescent in Edinburgh's fashionable West End. His next-door neighbour was the eminent surgeon Joseph Bell.

He died in Edinburgh on 10 February 1902. He is buried in Dean Cemetery with his wife Mary Anderson of Bleaton Hallet, and son, Dr Lionel Charles Peel Ritchie. The grave is marked by an obelisk and stands in the south-east section.

== Family ==
His son Henry Peel Ritchie won the Victoria Cross in the First World War.

His son Dr Lionel Charles Peel Ritchie was drowned in Granton Harbour in 1914.

== Publications ==
- Thomas Hill Pattison MD (1885)
- On the Remedies used by the Caffres to Prevent Blood Poisoning from Anthrax (1887)
- The Early Days of the Royall Colledge of Physitians, Edinburgh (1899)
