= Michael Ritchie (shinty) =

Scottish shinty player (born 1972)

Michael Ritchie (born 1972) is a shinty player for Newtonmore Camanachd Club. He is a goalkeeper and is the son of the legendary David "Tarzan" Ritchie.

== Playing career ==
Although his father was a renowned outfield player, Ritchie Jr has made a career as a goalkeeper although he was an outfield player when he made his debut aged 21 for Newtonmore. He has played outfield for phases of his career.

He suffered an unfortunate lapse in the 2008 Macaulay Cup final against Inveraray when a blunder from a routine shy caused him to let in the winning goal.

Ironically given the rivalry between Kingussie and Newtonmore, Ritchie lives with his family in Kingussie next door to Kingussie's Michael Clark.
