= William E. Ritchie =

American trick cyclist (1871–1943)

- Born: William Edward Ritchie; 11 October 1871; Philadelphia, US
- Died: 12 May 1943 (aged 71); New York City, US
- Resting place: Kensico Cemetery
- Other name: Billy Ritchie
- Occupation: Showman
- Known for: Comedy tramp cyclist act
- Spouse(s): Liska, Madeleine

William E. Ritchie was an American trick cyclist who performed around the world, including the United States, England, continental Europe, Africa, and Australia. He was one of the first to use the tramp cyclist routine on stage, where he appeared in vaudeville with Will Rogers and W. C. Fields.

He is not to be confused with the tramp comedian William 'Billie' Ritchie.

== Early life ==
William Edward Ritchie was born in Philadelphia, United States, to George and Mary Ritchie (née May) on 11 October 1871.

== Career ==
He initially found fame in New York, appearing dressed as a tramp riding on various bicycles. His main bicycle was a Cleveland, possibly a model 69 made by H. A. Lazier Company.

In London in 1899, he appeared in two short films: Ritchie, Tramp Cyclist, produced by the Warwick Trading Company, and Ritchie the Tramp Cyclist, produced by the British Mutoscope and Biograph Company.

He performed at various times in combinations with fellow trick cyclists Madeline Kilpatrick, May Villion, and W. H. Barber (aka 'Diavolo'), in acts called the Ritchie Duo, the Barber-Ritchie Trio, and the Four Ritchies.

In both 1917 and 1918, he appeared in the Ziegfeld Follies alongside W. C. Fields, Marilyn Miller, Will Rogers and Eddie Cantor.

== Death ==
On 12 May 1943, age 71, he died of a heart attack in his home at 2167 Haviland Avenue in the Bronx.
