= Ritchie (given name) =

- Pronunciation: English: /ˈrɪtʃi/ RITCH-ee
- Gender: Male

Other names
- Alternative spelling: Richie
- Related names: Richard, Rich, Rick, Ricky, Dick, Dickie

Ritchie is a masculine given name, most often a diminutive form of Richard. People with the name include:

- Ritchie Adams (1938–2017), American singer and songwriter
- Ritchie Bayly (born 1962), Irish footballer
- Ritchie Blackmore (born 1945), English guitarist
- Ritchie Bodily (1918–1997), British philatelist
- Ritchie Branagan (born 1991), English footballer
- Ritchie Buckle (born 1960), English darts player
- Ritchie Calder (1906–1982), Scottish journalist and academic
- Ritchie Cordell (1943–2004), American songwriter and record producer
- Ritchie Coster (born 1967), English actor
- Ritchie De Laet (born 1988), Belgian footballer
- Ritchie Duffie (born 1992), American soccer player
- Ritchie Edhouse (born 1983), English professional darts player
- Ritchie Gardner (born 1958/59), English darts player
- Ritchie Girvan (1887–1958), Scottish academic
- Ritchie Green (1925–1999), Australian rules footballer
- Ritchie Hanlon (born 1978), English footballer
- Ritchie Hawkins (born 1983), English motorcycle speedway rider
- Ritchie Humphreys (born 1977), English footballer
- Ritchie Johnston (1931–2001), New Zealand track cyclist
- Ritchie Jones (born 1986), English footballer
- Ritchie Kitoko (born 1988), Belgian footballer
- Ritchie Kotschau (born 1975), American soccer player
- Ritchie Macdonald (1895–1987), New Zealand politician
- Ritchie McKay (born 1965), American basketball coach
- Ritchie Makuma Mpasa (born 1985), French footballer
- Ritchie Bizwick Muyewa, Malawian politician
- Ritchie Neville (born 1979), English singer
- Ritchie Perry (born 1942), British writer
- Ritchie Petty (born 1968), American stock car racing driver
- Ritchie Pickett (1955–2011), New Zealand singer and songwriter
- Ritchie Price (born 1984), American college basketball coach
- Ritchie Robertson (born 1952), British academic
- Ritchie Singer, Australian actor
- Ritchie Sutton (born 1986), English footballer
- Ritchie Thomas (1915–1988), Australian rules footballer
- Ritchie Torres (born 1988), New York politician
- Ritchie Valens (1941–1959), American rock and roll musician
- Ritchie Whorton (born 1960), American politician
- Ritchie Yorke (1944–2017), Australian author and broadcaster
- Ritchie (rapper), a member of Injury Reserve
- Ritchie (vocalist) (born 1952), British-born Brazilian singer-songwriter, vocalist, musician, composer, dancer and multi-instrumentalist.

== See also ==
- Richie, given name
