= David Ritchie (cricketer) =

English cricketer (1892–1974)

David Mawdsley Ritchie (12 August 1892 – 10 September 1974) was an English cricketer active from 1922 to 1926 who played for Lancashire. He was born in Liverpool and died in Stevenage. He appeared in four first-class matches as a righthanded batsman who bowled right arm fast. He scored 27 runs with a highest score of 12 and held four catches. He took nine wickets with a best analysis of three for 44.
