= John Ritchie (Australian footballer) =

Australian rules footballer (1932–2008)

Personal information
- Full name: John Alexander Ritchie
- Born: 4 January 1932
- Died: 2 August 2008 (aged 76)
- Original team: Box Hill Tech
- Height: 178 cm (5 ft 10 in)
- Weight: 74 kg (163 lb)

Playing career^{1}
Years	Club	Games (Goals)
1951–55	Richmond	40 (2)
- ^{1} Playing statistics correct to the end of 1955.

John Alexander Ritchie (4 January 1932 – 2 August 2008) was an Australian rules footballer who played with Richmond in the Victorian Football League (VFL).
