= Andrew Jackson Ritchie =

American politician (1868–1948)

Andrew Jackson Ritchie (June 30, 1868–1948) was the founder of Rabun Gap Industrial School, which later merged with Nacoochee Institute to become Rabun Gap-Nacoochee School. He served there as president until 1939.

Ritchie earned his Bachelor of Law from the University of Georgia (UGA) School of Law in 1897. While at UGA, Ritchie was a member of the Phi Kappa Literary Society. He received a Bachelor of Arts in 1899 from Harvard University and was the first college graduate from Rabun County, Georgia. In 1901, he was awarded an honorary Master of Arts degree by Harvard. He was a local historian and in 1948 his Sketches of Rabun County History was published.

Before founding the Rabun Gap Industrial School, Ritchie was a professor of English for three years at Baylor University in Texas.

His wife was Addie Corn Ritchie.
