= David Ritchie (physicist) =

Physics and semiconductor professor

David Ritchie is a professor of experimental physics at the University of Cambridge and of semiconductor science and technology at Swansea University. He is known for his work in III-V semiconductor physics.

He was awarded the 2008 Tabor medal and prize by the UK Institute of Physics. He is a Fellow of the UK Institute of Physics and was elected a Fellow of the Learned Society of Wales in 2020, and member of Academia Europaea in 2021.
