= Joe Ritchie =

American money manager (1947–2022)

Joseph Ritchie
- Born: January 1, 1947
- Died: February 22, 2022 (aged 75)
- Education: Wheaton College in Wheaton, Illinois
- Known for: options, trading, commodities trading

Joseph Jay Ritchie (January 1, 1947 – February 22, 2022), better known as Joe Ritchie, was an options and commodities trader. In 1977, he founded Chicago Board Crushers, later renamed Chicago Research and Trading (CRT) and served as the head of Fox River Partners at the time of his death. Ritchie had ten children and was married to Sharon Ritchie for over fifty years.

== Early career ==
Ritchie attended Wheaton College, where he studied philosophy. After graduating in 1969, he worked as a bus driver for the Chicago Transit Authority. Ritchie later worked as a guard at the Cook County Jail. While there, Ritchie's life took a new direction when a friend handed him a book on how to strike it rich trading commodities.

In 1970, Ritchie became a programmer for Arthur Andersen. It was at Arthur Andersen where he first met Steve Fossett on a project for Marshall Field's.

In 1976, Ritchie started working the floor of the Chicago Board Options Exchange (CBOE). Ritchie's time at the CBOE lasted a short two months, but it was there that he programmed the Black–Scholes formula into his Texas Instruments SR-52. This small use of technology led to a huge success on the floor. Ritchie later lost interest in trading stock options, and left the CBOE, but before he left, he gave his Texas Instrument calculator, which was programmed with the Black–Scholes formula, to Steve Fossett.

According to Ritchie, “A trader on the floor with the simplest programming calculators in 1976 instantly became a one-eyed man in the land of the blind.” Fossett made a fortune using this calculator and became the single biggest trader on the floor of the CBOE. Later, in his book Chasing the Wind, Fossett attributed his success as a trader to Ritchie.

Ritchie left the Chicago Board Options Exchange (CBOE) in 1976, and returned to trading futures at the Chicago Board of Trade (CBOT). Ritchie continued trading futures when he started Chicago Research and Trading (CRT). CRT returned to the options business when the CBOT started trading options on futures.

== Chicago Research & Trading (CRT) ==
Ritchie founded Chicago Board Crushers, later renamed Chicago Research and Trading (CRT), an options and futures trading firm, in 1977.

CRT was also one of the first to computerize the options value theory as they pioneered computer-driven trading strategies. In 1985, Institutional Investor Magazine stated, “CRT rides a wave of heady profits, thanks to its computer-driven trading strategies.” CRT's capacity to value options far more precisely enabled them to narrow the bid/ask spread in the options market. In 1988, The Wall Street Journal wrote, “CRT's secret is a computer system that uses one of the most sophisticated trading models in the securities industry. By monitoring differences in the options and futures prices, the model developed mainly by Mr. Ritchie, the firm executed more than $2.5 billion in trades each day.”

=== CRT's Impact ===
During a period in the 1980s, CRT was doing more options trading than any other firm in the world. In a 1986 article “These Traders Made All-Star by Hitting Singles,” Business Week reported “Those singles, razor-thin-profits on millions of transactions each year, makes CRT a perennial all-star.” CRT monitored those millions of transactions with a computerized system that was far ahead of the curve. By 1988, CRT's initial stake of $200,000 had grown to $225 million. By 1993 CRT had grown to over 700 employees.

=== Unique business perspective ===
Ritchie's unique perspective translated into every area of his business, from the way he viewed his employees to unique investment strategies. Trader Monthly said of Ritchie, “ Joe's ability to look ahead not just six months, but several years, is second to none.” This perspective helped him see commodities and stocks that were undervalued, but it also translated into an ability to recognize people that were undervalued.

Ritchie hired traders that were able to think outside the box. Bud Hunt, former CFO of CRT, told the story of Ritchie eliminating a potential hire based on a quick glance at his resume. “He looked at it for about 5 seconds and then said “Not interested! He has three strikes on the first line, his first name is an initial, there are three Roman numerals after his last name and he has an MBA.” Ritchie looked for people that might not have had the right degrees but could think for themselves.

CRT had a unique business style as well as corporate culture. In 1988, Risk Magazine reported, “CRT is known for its idiosyncratic operating style as well as for its unrivalled trading technology. Management is non-authoritarian, work is supposed to be fun and employee competition is shunned. For the most part, CRT looks outside the financial industry for employees and especially avoids MBA types.” A CRT employee observed, “Applicants for employment are viewed more like candidates for adoption... others look for the best heads. CRT looks for the best hearts.”

=== Selling CRT ===
Ritchie sold CRT to Nations Bank (now Bank of America) in 1993 for $225 million. In that transaction, CRT was advised by investment banker Bruce Jackson, CEO of Carver Cross Securities Corp. and formerly of Brown Brothers Harriman. After selling CRT, Ritchie remained at the forefront of trading as the head of the Fox River Partners LLC and Fox River Execution.

== Fox River Partners LLC ==
Ritchie started Fox River Partners (then Fox River Financial Resources) along with Keith Dickson in 1993 after selling Chicago Research and Trading (CRT), where he continued investing with the same style and methodology that he used at CRT. Fox River invests in hedge funds, real estate related transactions and mitigation deals for endangered species.

=== The Hollywood Sign ===
In 2002, Fox River partner, Keith Dickson, purchased 138 acres (56 ha) from the Howard Hughes’ estate, which included the Cahuenga Peak where the famous Hollywood Sign sits. This section is the last undeveloped, privately owned ridge in LA and the highest point of elevation in the area. Hughes bought the land in 1940 with the hopes of building a romantic gateway for him and his girlfriend Ginger Rogers. Dickson said, “We kind of feel we got a Van Gogh at a garage sale." Trust for Public Land, a nature conservation group, bought the peak from Fox River.

== Fox River Execution ==
In 2001, Ritchie started Fox River Execution (FREX), an agency broker and dealer that provides algorithmic trading technology and execution solutions. FREX's algorithms were set apart from other trading technologies by computerizing human intuition. Institutional Investor reported in 2007 that Fox River is “ a relative unknown that turns in a stunning performance, placing first among NYSE brokerages,” and said of the systems that Fox River builds, “they are programmed to recognize multiple patterns that become part of the human trader's intuition, along with how they work with or against one another in a multitude of situations.” In July 2010, Fox River Execution was acquired by Sungard and now operates as one of its subsidiaries.

== Other business ventures ==
While managing Fox River and its subsidiaries, Ritchie launched a number of other business ventures in various sectors and countries. Most of these ventures were byproducts of established relationships where Ritchie teamed up to do business and add to human dignity. CNN reported that Ritchie is motivated by “a keen interest in raising people's self esteem in all his ventures,” due to his struggle with a lack of confidence well into his early forties. Most notable were businesses in Russia and Japan. Ritchie also put a bid on Eastern Airlines when it was tanking in the late 1990s in an attempt to resurrect the company.

=== Joint ventures in Russia ===
Ritchie began doing business in Russia during the Cold War with creation of a company, Management Partners International or MPI, which became the American partner in the second ever Soviet-American Joint Venture — JV Dialogue, founding in 1987 and by 1992 the company had become a network of 110 subsidiaries in various fields ranging from JV Dialogue to Dialogue Bank and real estate and architecture, with nearly 5,000 employees. The MPI General Manager was Jack Byers who lived in Moscow and worked as a team with Pyotr Zrelov the General Director of JV Dialogue. Among other things, JV Dialogue was the exclusive distributor for Microsoft products for two years, and Steve Ballmer came to Moscow to announce the relationship. During that time the company sold Microsoft products throughout its network of affiliates as well as converting MS-DOS and Microsoft Works to the Russian language. Bill Gates came to Moscow for both product announcements. The company affiliates were in 26 cities across the Soviet Union. Through its network, JV Dialogue represented a number of Western technology products and eventually created a JV named Summit Systems, located in Minsk, Byelorussia, with Chips and Technologies being an American partner and Aeroflot being the prime Soviet partner. Summit Systems produced personal computers, which were then sold primarily through the JV Dialogue network. JV Dialogue provided three course hot lunches for all employees as prepared by a chef trained at the Culinary Institute of America.

Ritchie was happy to let the Russians run Dialogue. International Business magazine quoted Ritchie; “I don't know how to make money over here (Russia) — they do.” Harvard Business Review stated, “Ritchie stepped into the background, making it clear to employees, vendors, and government officials that he had fully empowered them to run the show.”

=== Japan ===
Ritchie started working in Japan in 2001 with two brothers, Chris and Brian Oxley. They launched a variety of businesses in housekeeping and service management that brought American know-how, but also focused on bringing pride and dignity to people's work. Service jobs in Japan are typically looked down upon, but these ventures provided training and equipment that encouraged employees to take pride in their work.

=== Eastern Airlines ===
In 1989, Ritchie committed $30 million of his own cash to buy Eastern Airlines when it was about to go into liquidation due to financial setbacks and strained union relations (partly due to the aggressive management of owner Frank Lorenzo). In partnership with the unions, Ritchie's plan to take over Eastern Airlines involved the unions taking a 50% pay cuts. The Atlanta Journal-Constitution said this of his potential purchase, “Mr. Ritchie could save an airline integral to the history of the US flying, and place an important brake on the present molting habits of the airline industry.” A Bankruptcy judge denied Ritchie's plan and Eastern Airlines was liquidated.

== Afghanistan ==
Joe and his brother, James Ritchie, lived in Afghanistan as children, from 1957 to 1961. Their father had moved his young family to Kabul where he taught civil engineering. Before the September 11, 2001 attacks on the World Trade Center Towers, Joe and James, were working to free Afghans from oppressive Taliban rule. The Ritchie brothers attempted to fill the foreign policy vacuum that had been left by the United States in Afghanistan.

=== Talks with Haq and the Afghan King ===
In 2000, Joe and James, along with Robert McFarlane, President Reagan's Security Advisor, met with Abdul Haq (Afghan leader), one of the most successful commanders in Afghanistan during the struggle against the Soviet Union in the 1980s. With Abdul Haq, the Ritchies worked to create a strategy for Afghanistan to transition into a more democratic and modern society with the help of the former Afghan King Zahir Shah. The Ritchie brothers and Abdul Haq enlisted the former King “to serve as the catalyst and moral foundation of the process.” The former king and his council voted unanimously to accept Haq's plan in Afghanistan.

=== Filling the foreign policy vacuum ===
Stephen Kinzer, reporting for the New York Times in 2001 wrote “Before Afghanistan became a focused attention, James and Joseph Ritchie spent much of this year trying to persuade the Bush Administration to embrace their efforts.” Peter Tomsen, former special envoy to Afghanistan was quoted saying in reference to the Ritchie brothers that they “went into a vacuum left by the US Government. We had no policy on Afghanistan in the two Clinton Administrations and the Bush Administration didn't pay attention to Afghanistan until September 11.”

Some of the plan was never put into action, due to the death of Abdul Haq in 2001. The State Department later said, “We know the Ritchies were working with Abdul Haq and other Afghans...we have no objections at all.”

== Rwanda ==
After meeting the Rwandan President, Paul Kagame in 2003, Ritchie decided immediately to partner with President Kagame to develop the Rwandan economy in the wake of the 1994 genocide.

To facilitate private sector investment the Rwandan Development Board (RDB) and Presidential Advisory Council (PAC) were formed. As of 2012, Ritchie co-chairs the PAC. He was also the founding-CEO of the RDB up until 2009. The New Times of Kigali reported that the “RDB is an institution that has been tasked with spearheading Rwanda's development and tackling the most urgent problems and opportunities affecting the country's economy.”

CNN, explained the focus that Rwanda has been getting from large corporations like Starbucks and Costco, “Why the attention to Rwanda, a land-locked country of about 9 million people about the size of Maryland? It's no accident. Many of the corporate ties between the U.S. and Rwanda can be traced back to a Chicago-area businessman: Joe Ritchie.”

For his extensive work in Rwanda, Ritchie received the National Order of Outstanding Friendship (Igihango), from the President of Rwanda His Excellency Paul Kagame, on November 18, 2017.

== Malawi ==
In 2010, Ritchie met Joyce Banda, then Vice President of Malawi. He believed that she had potential to be one of the great leaders of this generation and thus worked with her to gather private sector support. This was done under the radar, since her popularity in Malawi put her life in danger. The late President of Malawi, Bingu wa Mutharika died on April 5, 2012, and Ritchie then worked openly with the new president, Joyce Banda.

== Death ==
Ritchie died on February 22, 2022. Former Chicago Board of Trade Chairman Patrick Arbor said the cause was COVID-19.
