= Rand, Avery & Company =

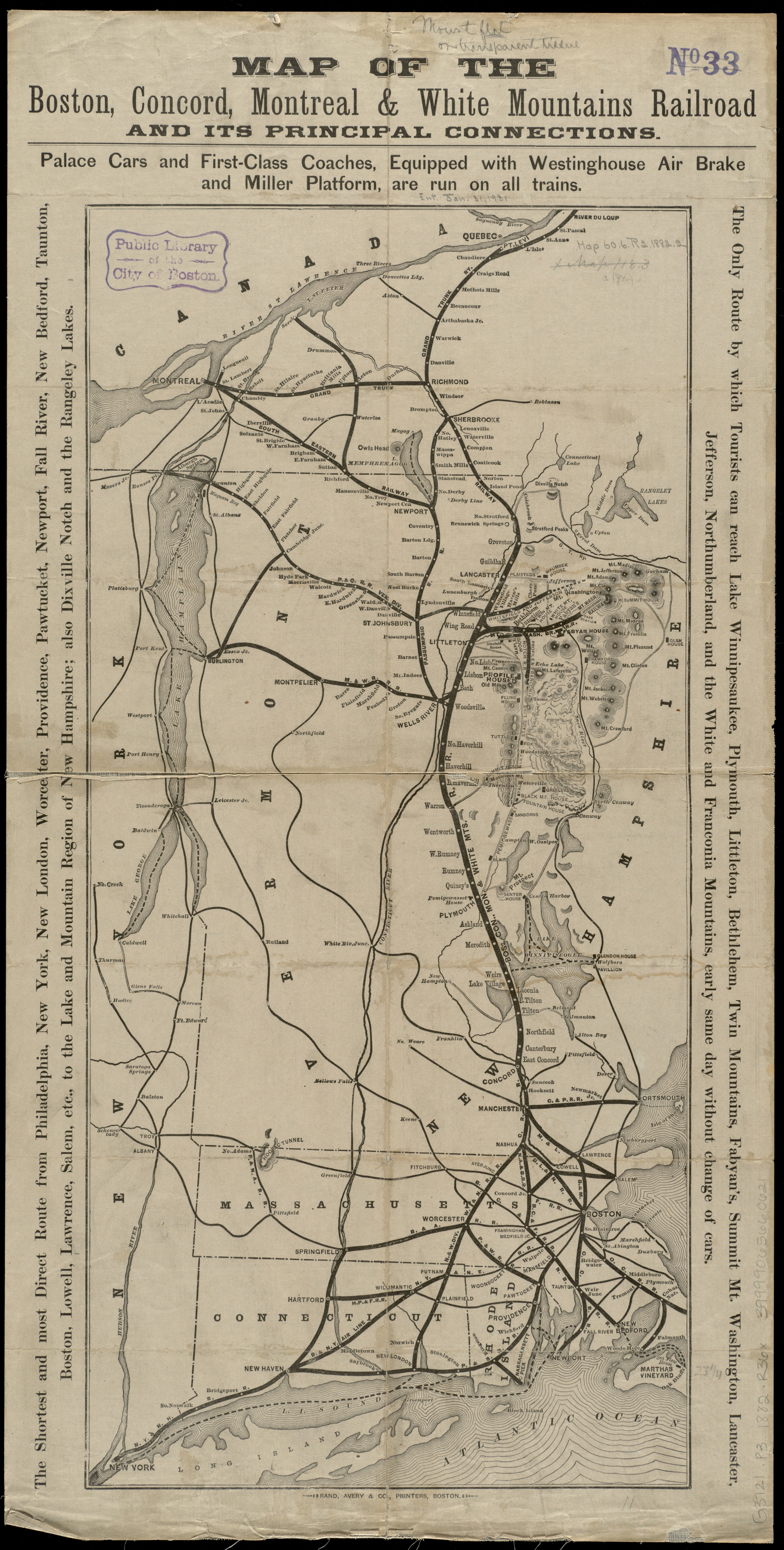
Map of The Boston, Concord, Montreal and White Mountains Railroad and its principal connections, 1882

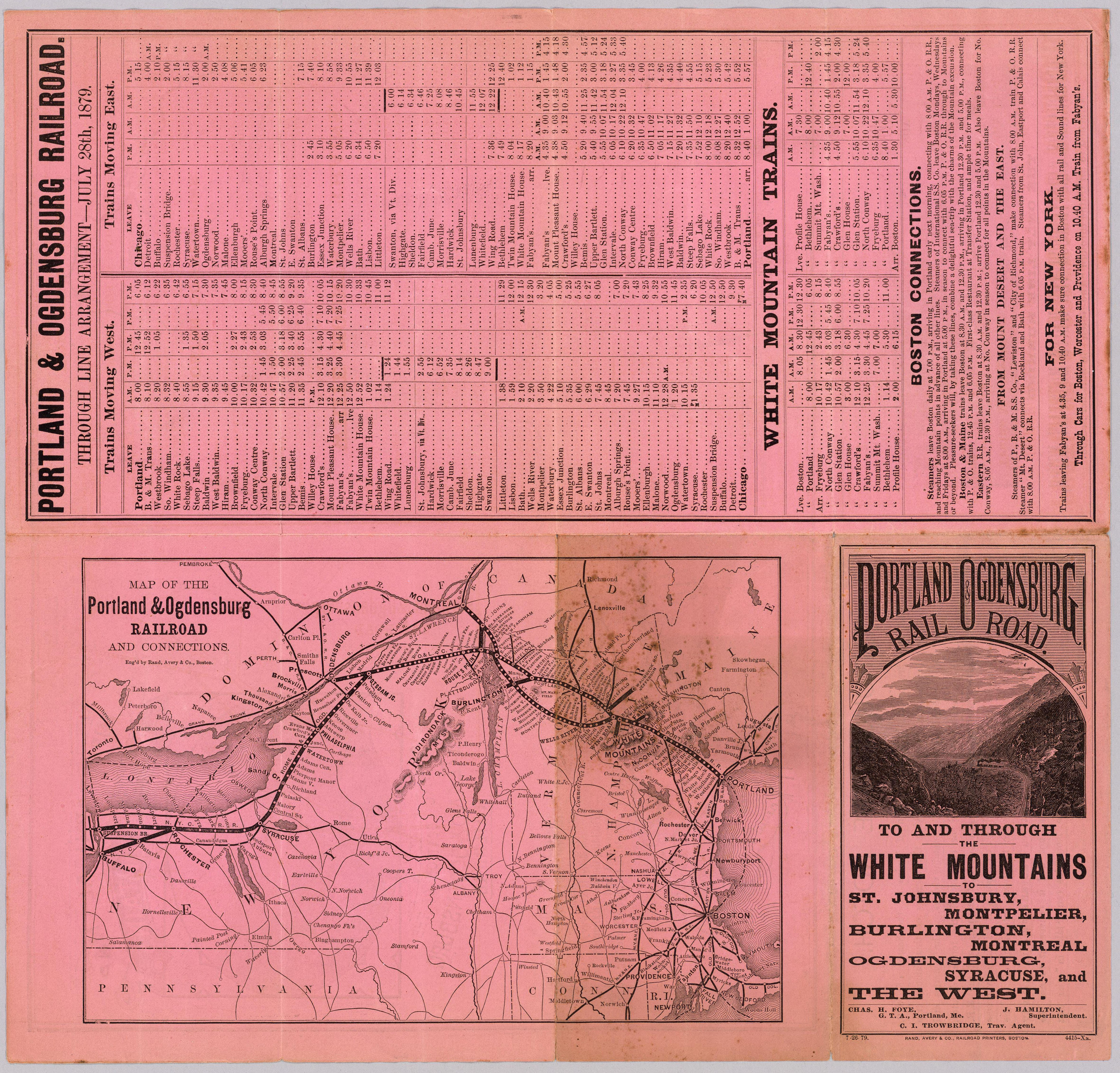
Map and timetable for the Portland & Ogdensburg Railroad, 1879

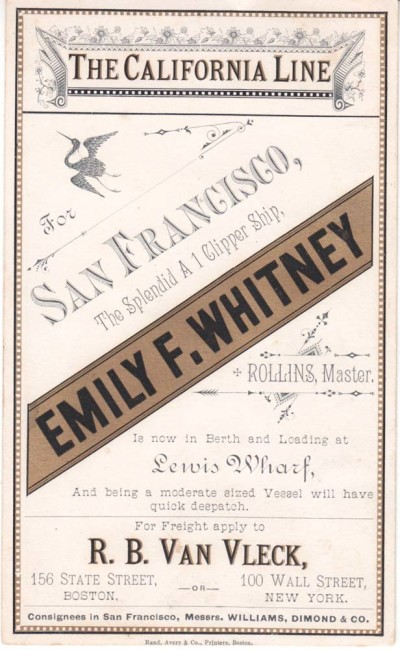
Printed advertisement for the clipper ship Emily F. Whitney, circa 1879

Rand-Avery, also referred to as Rand, Avery, & Company, or Geo. C. Rand & Avery, was a prominent printing company in Boston during the 19th century. Rand Avery Supply Co. was a successor firm and continued into the 20th century. The company went bankrupt in 1888.

== History ==
George Curtis Rand (13 December 13, 1819 - December 30, 1878) established Rand, Avery & Company. He was related to William Rand, who was one of the founding members of Rand, McNally & Company, and Franklin Rand, publisher of the Zion's Herald.

Promoter and controversial muckracker Tom Lawson (muckraker) took over the firm and liquidated it after losing a battle with its directors.

The company occupied several buildings including 117 Franklin Street in Boston, Massachusetts.

Moses King who later became known for his guidebooks and directories, worked at Rand-Avery early in his career.

== Publications ==
In 1852, Rand printed the first book edition of Harriet Beecher Stowe’s Uncle Tom’s Cabin for its publisher, John P. Jewett & Co.

The firm printed sailing cards, travel and sightseeing guides for rail passengers, and area histories.

It published Harriet E. Wilson's novel Our Nig in 1959.

In 1860, the firm was a printer for Walt Whitman.

The firm printed the first edition of Uncle Tom's Cabin.

It was one of the printers of Mark Twain's The Prince and the Pauper. It also published Edwin M. Bacon's Dictionary of Boston in 1883 and included an advertisement insert with an engraved drawing of a printing operation. It printed a herald for the Barnum and London Circus.
