= Dave Ritchie (footballer) =

Australian rules footballer (born 1935)

Personal information
- Full name: Dave Ritchie
- Born: 19 April 1935 (age 91)
- Original team: Boronia
- Height: 188 cm (6 ft 2 in)
- Weight: 80 kg (176 lb)

Playing career^{1}
Years	Club	Games (Goals)
1957–59	Hawthorn	11 (2)
- ^{1} Playing statistics correct to the end of 1959.

David Ritchie (born 19 April 1935) is a former Australian rules footballer who played with Hawthorn in the Victorian Football League (VFL).
