= David "Tarzan" Ritchie =

Scottish shinty player (born 1945)

David "Tarzan" Ritchie (born 1945) is a former shinty player from Newtonmore, Scotland. He is notable for having won 12 Camanachd Cup medals, a record he held alongside fellow Newtonmore player Hugh Chisholm for many years.

== Playing career ==
"Tarzan" played his entire career for Newtonmore and was a legendary part of their success throughout the 1960s, 1970s and 1980s. He won his first Camanachd Cup in 1967. He won the Albert Smith Medal in 1979 and was Captain when Newtonmore won the cup in 1981. He was still playing Full-Forward in Newtonmore's defeat against Skye Camanachd in 1990.

"Tarzan" also won several MacGillvary Leagues, MacAulay Cups and MacTavish Cups.

He was a bricklayer in his day job and was renowned for his strength, tenacity and speed. His son Michael is the Goalkeeper for Newtonmore.

There are two iconic images associated with Ritchie - both taken by Inverness photographer Ewen Weatherspoon - one of him raising the Camanachd Cup at the 1981 Camanachd Cup Final in Glasgow and the other with a bandaged head with a massive Union Flag in the background at the 1982 Camanachd Cup final in Inverness.
