= Rick (given name) =

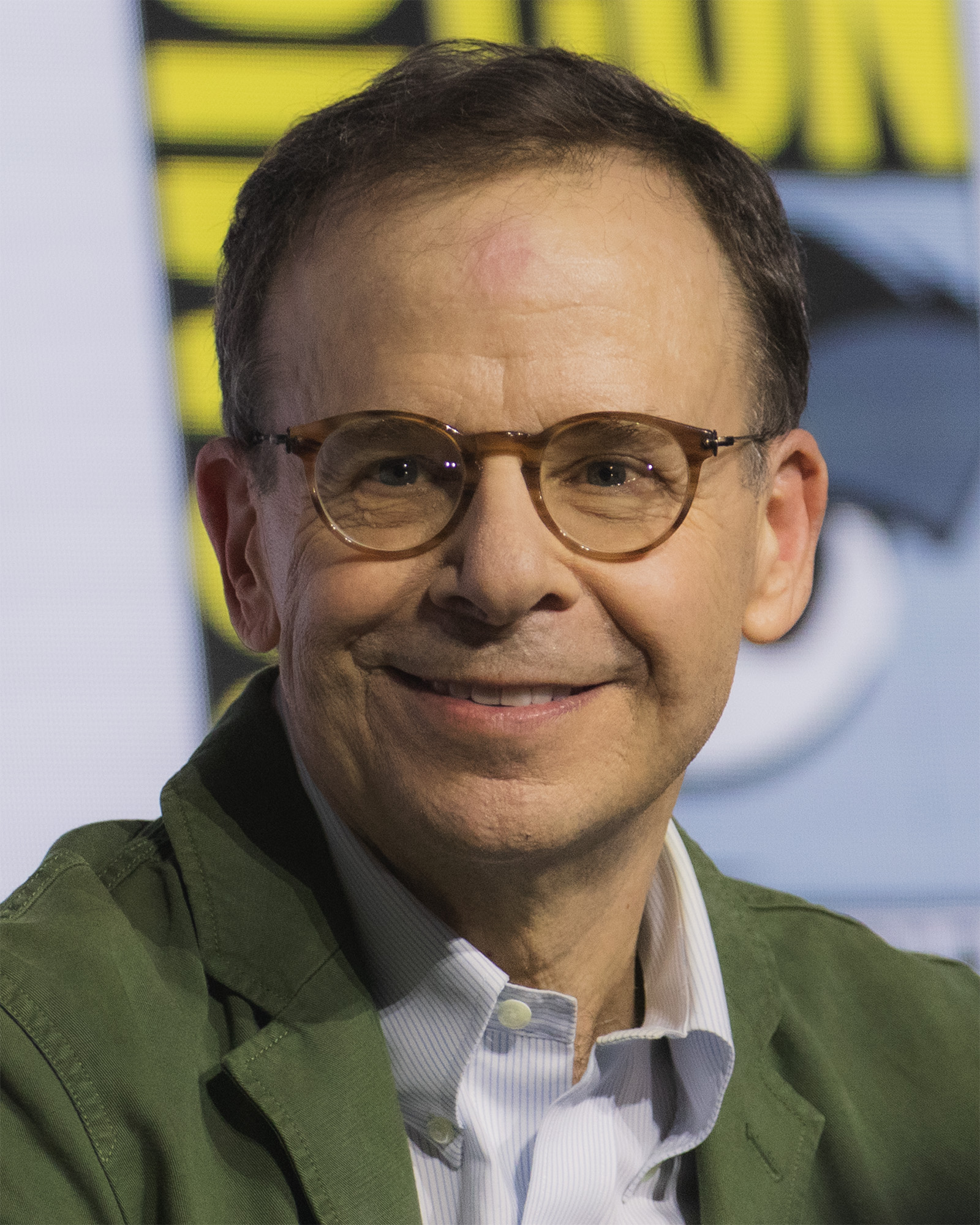
- Rick Moranis in 2026
- Pronunciation: /rɪk/
- Gender: Male

Other names
- Related names: Richard, Frederick, Ricky, Patrick

Rick is a masculine given name, often a short form (hypocorism) of Richard, Frederick, Patrick, and similar names ending in -rick. It may refer to:

== People ==
- Rick Adams (disambiguation)
- Rick Adduono (born 1955), Canadian professional ice hockey coach and player
- Rick Aiello (1955–2021), American film and television actor
- Rick W. Allen (born 1951), American politician
- Rick Anderson (disambiguation)
- Rick Astley (born 1966), British singer
- Rick Aviles (1952–1995), American stand-up comedian and actor
- Rick Bassman (born 1961), American entrepreneur, produce, talent agent, and author
- Ricky Bell (singer) (born 1967), American singer
- Rick Benjamin (disambiguation)
- Rick Berman (born 1945), American television producer, executive producer of several Star Trek series
- Rick Berns (born 1956), National Football League player
- Rick Bognar (1970–2019), Canadian professional wrestler, actor, and motivational speaker
- Rick Boogs (born 1987), American retired professional wrestler and graduated collegiate wrestler
- Rick Blight (1955–2005), Canadian ice hockey player
- Rick Carnes, American singer-songwriter
- Rick Cassidy (1943–2013), American pornographic actor, model and bodybuilder
- Rick Casson (born 1948), Canadian politician
- Rick Charls, American former American high diver
- Rick Carton (1967–2017), American artist
- Rick Cheek (born 1977), American kickboxer and mixed martial artist
- Rick Chertoff (born 1950), American record producer and songwriter
- Rick Christie, American politician
- Rick Cook (architect) (born 1960), New York City architect
- Rick Cook (writer) (1944–2022), American author
- Rick Crawford, several people
- Rick Crom (born 1957), American actor, singer, comedian, lyricist, and composer
- Rick Cua (born 1948), American Christian rock singer, songwriter, bassist, author and ordained minister
- Rick Danko (1942–1999), Canadian musician, singer and songwriter, member of The Band
- Rick Davies (1944–2025), English musician
- Rick Davies (footballer) (born 1952), Australian former rules footballer
- Rick Dees (born 1950), American radio personality and comedian who wrote and sang the #1 hit "Disco Duck"
- Rick Derringer (1947–2025), American guitarist, vocalist, producer and songwriter
- Rick DeVecchi (1961–1998), American murder victim
- Rick Devens (born 1984), American communications director and reality television contestant
- Rick Dore, American custom car builder
- Rick Ducommun (1952–2015), Canadian stand-up comedian, actor, writer and producer
- Rick Duncan (American football) (born 1941), American football player
- Rick Fitts, American film and television actor
- Rick Flens (born 1983), Dutch road bicycle racer
- Rick Fraser (disambiguation)
- Rick Fuller (born 1967), American retired professional wrestler
- Rick Garcia (activist) (1956–2026), American LGBTQ rights activist
- Rick Gibson (born 1951), Canadian sculptor and artist
- Rick Gibson (golfer), Canadian professional golfer
- Rick Glassman (born 1984), American actor and comedian
- Rick Green (disambiguation), several people
- Rick Hansen (born 1957), Canadian track and field athlete
- Rick Hansen (politician) (born 1963), American politician
- Rick Hardcastle (born 1956), American businessman and rancher
- Rick Harrison, American television personality and pawn shop owner
- Rick Hearst (born 1965), American actor
- Rick Henderson (1928–2004), American jazz saxophonist and arranger
- Rick Hendrick (born 1949), American NASCAR team owner
- Rick Hillenbrand, American politician
- Rick Hoffman (born 1970), American actor
- Rick Howland, Canadian actor
- Rick Hurst (1946–2025), American actor
- Rick Jackson (born 1989), American basketball player
- Rick Jaffa (born 1956), American film screenwriter
- Rick James (1948–2004), American singer-songwriter, multi-instrumentalist and record producer
- Rick James (disambiguation), several people
- Rick Jeanneret (1942–2023), Canadian television and radio personality
- Rick Johnson (disambiguation)
- Rick Jones (disambiguation)
- Rick Kelly (born 1983), Australian racing driver
- Rick Lackman (1910–1990), American football player
- Rick Lax (born 1982), American entertainer
- Rick Leborious, American politician
- Rick Leed (1955–2017), American television and film producer
- Rick Leonard (born 1996), American football player
- Rick Leonardi (born 1957), American comics artist
- Rick Lewis (radio personality) (1960–2001), American radio announcer
- Rick Link (1959–2026), American professional wrestler
- Rick Lyle (born 1971), American football player
- Rick Martel, stage name of Canadian retired professional wrestler Richard Vigneault (born 1956)
- Rick Mazza (born 1961), Australian politician
- Rick Mears (born 1951), American race car driver
- Rick Mercer (born 1969), Canadian comedian, television personality, political satirist, and author
- Rick McGraw (1955–1985), American professional wrestler
- Rick Michaels (born 1974), American retired professional wrestler
- Rick Middleton (born 1953), Canadian retired National Hockey League player
- Rick Middleton (American football) (born 1951), American former National Football League player
- Rick Miller (baseball) (born 1948), American Major League Baseball player
- Rick Miller (Canadian politician) (born 1960), Canadian politician
- Rick Miller (comedian), Canadian comedian and presenter of the US television series Just for Laughs
- Rick Miller (speedway rider) (born 1961), American former international motorcycle speedway rider
- Rick Miller (Texas politician) (born 1946), American politician and retired United States Navy officer
- Rick Minton (born 1950), American politician
- Rick Mofina, Canadian author of crime fiction and thriller novels
- Rick Moody (born 1961), American novelist and short story writer
- Rick Moody (coach) (born 1954), American former women's basketball assistant coach
- Rick Moranis (born 1953), Canadian actor, comedian, musician, songwriter, writer and producer
- Rick Morocco (born 1963), Canadian-Italian ice hockey executive and former professional player
- Rick Nielsen (born 1946), lead guitarist, backing vocalist and primary songwriter of the rock band Cheap Trick
- Rick O'Dell (born 1948), Canadian racing driver
- Rick Olson (Iowa politician) (born 1951), Iowa state representative
- Rick Olson (Michigan politician) (born 1949), member of the Michigan House of Representatives
- Rick Pate (born 1955), American politician
- Rick Paterson (born 1958), Canadian former National Hockey League player and coach
- Rick Patterson (wrestler) (born 1964), Canadian professional wrestler
- Rick Perry (born 1950), American politician
- Rick Pitino, American basketball coach
- Rick Razzano (linebacker) (born 1955), National Football League player
- Rick Reed (pitcher) (born 1964), American Major League Baseball pitcher
- Rick Reinert (1925–2018), American animator, founder of Rick Reinert Productions
- Rick Rescorla (1939–2001), British-American soldier, police officer, educator and private security specialist
- Rick Richards, member of the American Southern rock band the Georgia Satellites
- Rick Riordan (born 1964), American author
- Rick Roberts (disambiguation)
- Rick Alan Ross (born 1952), consultant and founder of the Cult Education Institute
- Rick Ross (William Leonard Roberts II, born 1976), American rapper
- Rick Rubin (born 1963), American record producer
- Rick Rude, ring name of American professional wrestler Richard Rood (1958–1999)
- Rick Salomon (born c. 1968), American poker player mostly known for his relationships with various female celebrities
- Rick Sanford (born 1957), National Football League player
- Rick Santorum (born 1958), American politician and lawyer, 2012 presidential candidate
- Rick Sawatsky (born 1976), Canadian curler
- Rick Schwartz (born 1967), American film and television producer
- Rick Scott (born 1952), American politician
- Rick Scribner (born 1952), American racing driver
- Rick Shealy, American politician
- Rick Sheehy, American politician
- Rick Smith (disambiguation)
- Rick Smolan (born 1949), American former Time, Life, and National Geographic photographer
- Rick Sollo (1966–2026), Brazilian singer, songwriter and producer
- Rick Springfield (born 1949), Australian-American musician and actor
- Rick Steamboat, stage name for American retired professional wrestler Richard Henry Blood Sr. (born 1953)
- Rick Stein (born 1947), English celebrity chef, restaurateur and television presenter
- Rick Steiner (born 1961), ring name of American professional wrestler Robert Rechsteiner
- Rick Stephenson (born 1955 or 1956), American bodybuilder
- Rick Steves (born 1955), American author and travel television personality
- Rick Stitch, Canadian singer-songwriter
- Rick Sutcliffe (born 1956), American retired Major League Baseball pitcher and broadcaster
- Rick Turner (philosopher) (1941–1978), South African academic and anti-apartheid activist
- Rick Valente, American former competitive bodybuilder
- Rick Wakeman (born 1949), English keyboardist (Yes)
- Rick Walker (born 1955), American retired National Football League player and radio sports commentator
- Rick Wamsley (died 2013), American murder victim
- Rick Warden (born 1971), English actor
- Rick Wayne (born 1938), St. Lucia media personality
- Rick White (disambiguation)
- Rick Williams (disambiguation)
- Rick Wilson (basketball) (born 1956), American basketball player
- Rick Wilson (ice hockey) (born 1950), Canadian ice hockey player and coach
- Rick Wilson (jockey) (born 1954), American jockey
- Rick Wilson (racing driver) (born 1953), American NASCAR driver
- Rick Wilson (wrestler) (1965–1999), American professional wrestler best known as The Renegade in World Championship Wrestling
- Rick Young (born 1934), American rodeo clown and bullfighter
- Rick Youngblood, American politician elected to the Idaho House of Representatives in 2012
- Rick Younger, American performer
- Rick Yune (born 1971), American actor
- Rick Zabel (born 1993), German road bicycle racer
- Rick Zumwalt (1951–2003), American professional arm-wrestler and actor
- Rick Zumwalt (American football) (born 1965), American former defensive linebacker

== Fictional characters ==
- Ranger Rick Raccoon, mascot and character from the National Wildlife Federation's Ranger Rick magazine
- Rick, a character in Nintendo's Kirby series
- Rick Alessi, on the Australian soap opera Neighbours
- Rick Deckard, character and the protagonist of Philip K. Dick's 1968 novel Do Androids Dream of Electric Sheep?
- Rick Dicker, a character in the 2004 Disney/Pixar animated film The Incredibles
- Rick Grimes, the main character of the Walking Dead comic book series and its television adaptation of the same name
- Rick Jones (character), sidekick of several Marvel Comics superheroes
- Rick O'Connell, character and the main protagonist of the second incarnation of The Mummy franchise
- Rick Payne, a character from the Ghost Whisperer
- Rick Sanchez, a main character of the animated television series Rick and Morty

== See also ==
- Rich (given name)
- Rico (name)
- Ricky (given name)
- Rik (given name)
