= Richard Anderson (disambiguation) =

Richard Anderson (1926–2017) was an American actor.

Richard, Rich, Richie, or Dick Anderson may also refer to:

== Arts and entertainment ==
- Big Dad Ritch (James Richard Earl Anderson), lead vocalist for American red dirt metal band Texas Hippie Coalition
- Richard Dean Anderson (born 1950), American actor
- Richard L. Anderson (sound effects editor), American sound effects editor
- Richard Anderson (artist), American concept designer and artist
- Richie Anderson (presenter) (born 1986/7), Television and radio personality who works for the BBC

== Military ==
- Richard Clough Anderson Sr. (1750–1826), American Revolutionary War veteran, surveyor of Virginia Military District
- Richard H. Anderson (general) (1821–1879), American army officer and Confederate general in the American Civil War
- Richard H. Anderson (pilot), U.S. Army Air Force pilot
- Richard Anderson (British Army officer) (1907–1979), British Army general
- Richard B. Anderson (1921–1944), American Marine and World War II Medal of Honor recipient
  - USS Richard B. Anderson, US Navy destroyer named in his honor
- Richard A. Anderson (1948–1969), American Marine and Vietnam War Medal of Honor recipient

== Politics ==
- Richard Anderson (English MP) (1659–1695), English MP for Aylesbury from 1685 till 1689
- Dick Anderson (North Dakota politician) (born 1952), American politician, member of the North Dakota House of Representatives
- Dick Anderson (Oregon politician) (fl. 2021), American politician, Oregon State Senator
- Rich Anderson (Virginia politician) (born 1955), American politician, member of Virginia House of Delegates
- Rich Anderson (Iowa politician) (born 1956), American politician, Iowa state legislator
- Richard C. Anderson Jr. (1788–1826), American lawyer, politician, and diplomat

== Sports ==
- Dick Anderson (American football, born 1941), American college football coach
- Dick Anderson (American football, born 1944), American football player for the New Orleans Saints
- Dick Anderson (born 1946), American football player for the Miami Dolphins and College Football Hall of Fame inductee
- Richard Anderson (basketball) (born 1960), American basketball player
- Richie Anderson (BMX rider) (born 1967), American bicycle motocross (BMX) racer
- Richie Anderson (American football) (born 1971), American football player
- Richard Elias Anderson (born 1977), Canadian basketball player
- Ricky Anderson (American football) (born 1963), American football punter
- Richard Anderson (American football), American college football defensive tackle

== Others ==
- Richard Loree Anderson (1915–2003), American econometrician
- Richard Davis Anderson (1922–2008), American mathematician
- Richard Lloyd Anderson (1926–2018), BYU professor and Mormon historian
- Dick Carlson (born Richard Anderson, 1941–2025), director of the Voice of America from 1986 to 1991
- Richard C. Anderson (born 1934), American educational psychologist
- Richard H. Anderson (businessman) (born 1955), American attorney and CEO (Delta Air Lines and Amtrak)

== See also ==
- Richard Andersen (disambiguation)
- Rick Anderson (disambiguation)
- Richard Andersson (born 1972), Swedish musician
