= USS Hanson =

Gearing-class destroyer

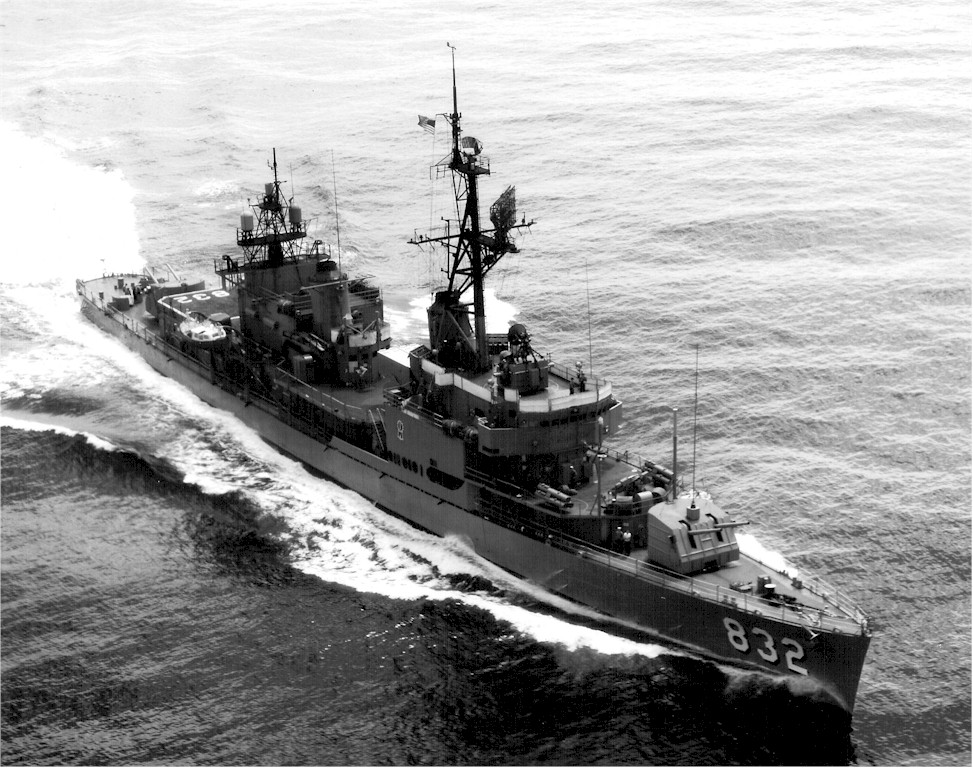
- USS Hanson underway on 17 August 1966

History

United States
- Name: Hanson
- Namesake: Robert M. Hanson
- Builder: Bath Iron Works
- Laid down: 7 October 1944
- Launched: 11 March 1945
- Sponsored by: Mrs. Harry A. Hanson
- Commissioned: 11 May 1945
- Decommissioned: 31 March 1973
- Reclassified: DDR-832, 8 March 1949; DD-832, 1 April 1964
- Stricken: 31 March 1973
- Home port: San Diego
- Identification: Callsign: NBBA; Hull number: DD-832
- Motto: All Seas
- Honors and awards: See Awards
- Fate: Transferred to Republic of China, 18 April 1973
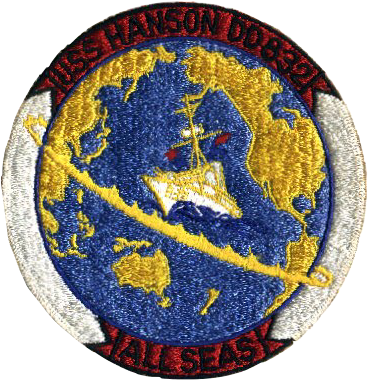
- Badge

Taiwan
- Name: Liao Yang; (遼陽)
- Namesake: Liao Yang
- Acquired: 18 April 1973
- Decommissioned: 1 June 2004
- Reclassified: DDG-921
- Identification: Hull number: DD-921
- Fate: Sunk as target, July 2006

General characteristics
- Class & type: Gearing-class destroyer
- Displacement: 3,460 long tons (3,516 t) full
- Length: 390 ft 6 in (119.02 m)
- Beam: 40 ft 10 in (12.45 m)
- Draft: 14 ft 4 in (4.37 m)
- Propulsion: Geared turbines, 2 shafts, 60,000 shp (45 MW)
- Speed: 35 knots (65 km/h; 40 mph)
- Range: 4,500 nmi (8,300 km) at 20 kn (37 km/h; 23 mph)
- Complement: after 1964: 278 Enlisted 18 Officers
- Armament: 6 × 5"/38 caliber guns; 12 × 40 mm AA guns; 11 × 20 mm AA guns; 10 × 21 inch (533 mm) torpedo tubes; 6 × depth charge projectors; 2 × depth charge tracks

USS Hanson (DD/DDR-832) was a Gearing-class destroyer of the United States Navy named after first lieutenant Robert M. Hanson of the United States Marine Corps squadron VMF-215.

== Construction and career ==
USS Hanson was launched on 11 March 1945, by the Bath Iron Works Corporation, in Bath, Maine, on the Kennebec River, sponsored by Mrs. Harry A. Hanson, mother of Lt. Hanson, and commissioned 11 May 1945.

=== Service in the United States Navy ===
After shakedown in the Caribbean and conversion to a picket destroyer at Boston Navy Yard, USS Hanson sailed for the Pacific on 7 November 1945, via the Caribbean, the Panama Canal, then north to refuel at San Diego and then on to Pearl Harbor. From Pearl Harbor, USS Hanson headed for Tokyo as part of a twelve-ship squadron. After about three days, the squadron encountered a typhoon that lasted four days. Severe damage was discovered later at Yokosuka Naval Base, and all the emergency rafts were lost and several of the 40mm shields had buckled. She spent most of the following year operating in support of occupation forces in Japan, with a September period of fleet maneuvers off the Chinese coast.

Reporting to the Atlantic Fleet at the Naval Station Norfolk in Virginia on 6 February 1947, USS Hanson trained along the East Coast until sailing in late January 1948 for her first tour of duty with the 6th Fleet in the Mediterranean.

She was designated with the title DDR-832 (radar picket destroyer) 8 March 1949. During her second deployment to the Mediterranean, in the summer of 1949, USS Hanson took part in two diplomatic missions to establish peace in the region. As a station ship to the United Nations General Assembly at the Isle of Rhodes, she was the only American warship present when Greece received control of the long-contested Dodecanese Islands. USS Hanson then carried United Nations mediator Dr. Ralph Bunche to Beirut, Lebanon, for peace negotiations over Israel.

==== Korean War ====
After extensive training in the Caribbean, USS Hanson returned to Newport, Rhode Island. On 6 January 1950, USS Hanson headed across the Atlantic in convoy with elements of the Sixth Fleet, including Midway, and at least two cruisers (Newport News was among these), twelve destroyers in all, including the Power and support auxiliaries. This would be USS Hanson's third Mediterranean deployment. Port calls included Rota (Spain), Gibraltar, Libya, Sicily, France, Alexandroupolis, Pisa, Livorno, Trieste and Taranto . In May 1950, USS Hanson returned west from Gibraltar after ending the Mediterranean deployment, arriving at her home port on June 1, 1950. Once USS Hanson returned, she was ordered to change home ports to San Diego. However, on 25 June 1950, armed conflict broke out on the Korean peninsula. USS Hanson was scheduled to travel to Korea, bypassing her new home port of San Diego and heading straight to Pearl Harbor and becoming part of T.F.77, bound for Pusan, Korea, escorting US Marines to the war zone.

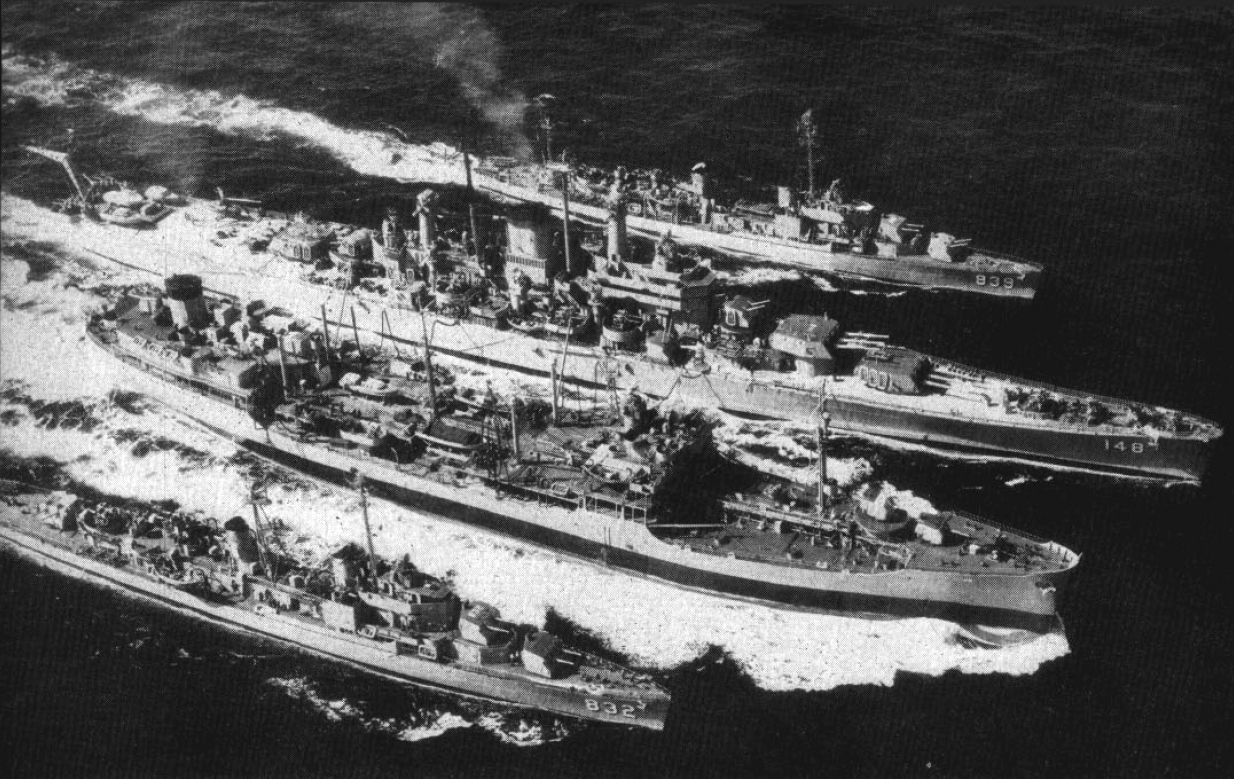
USS Salamonie (AO-26), Hanson, Powers, Newport News, refueling 1950 Mediterranean deployment.

En route to and when departing from Pusan, Hanson provided plane guard for the carriers, acted as a beacon for returning aircraft (bird dog operations), completed shore bombardment missions and sought out enemy planes with her air search radar. In her first major deployment in the war Hanson, along with 300 other warships, participated in the amphibious operations at Inchon on 15 September 1950. The tides at Inchon changed as much as 30 to 40 feet, and the currents were fierce, making it exceedingly difficult for the troops to get ashore. Anti-ship mines were a great hazard and extra lookouts were posted to locate and destroy them using her 40 mm anti-aircraft guns. The North Korean army would tie two mines together using a length of cable causing the two mines to draw together against a passing ship, setting off the mines and damaging or sinking the vessel. North Koreans would also place mines and fishermen in fishing vessels to trick US ships into helping the people aboard; the mines would detonate, damaging or sinking the Navy ship. Hanson on two occasions encountered such fishing boats full of people and mines, but stayed clear and fired its anti-aircraft guns on the vessels causing them to explode and sink taking the boats' crews down with them. The North Koreans also let mines float freely on the open ocean, which was against the Geneva Conventions. Hanson headed to Sasebo, Japan, her temporary home port about two weeks before Thanksgiving of 1950. On Thanksgiving Day Hanson left Sasebo and headed back to Korea. Hanson provided fire cover for the successful evacuation of Hŭngnam and Wonsan, just before Christmas that year. With the Mediterranean operation and her participation in the Korean war, Hanson sailed for 254 days in 1950. Hanson would stay at sea until mid-January 1951, before returning to Sasebo. Hanson would finally reach her new home port of San Diego in April 1951.

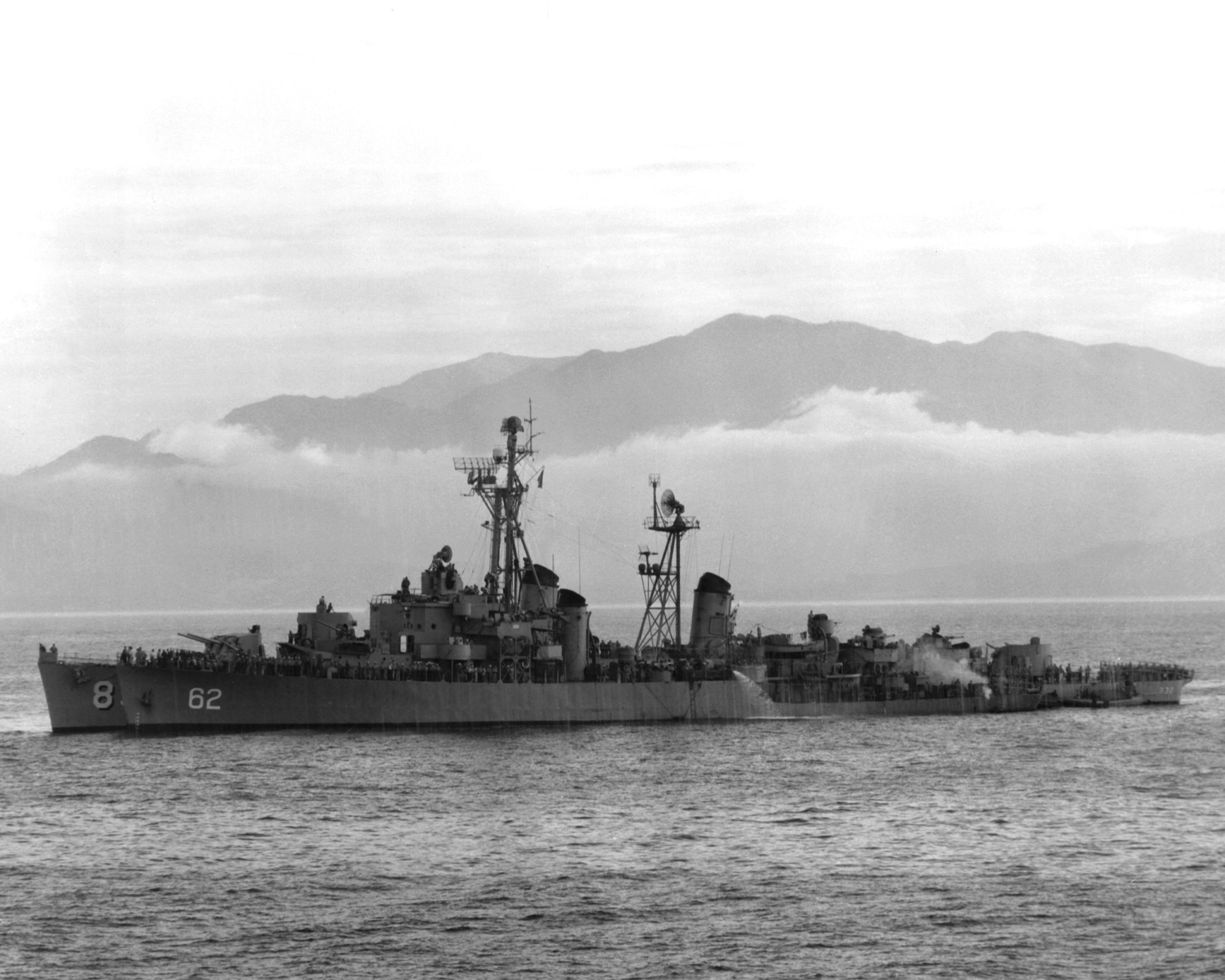
Hanson helping Apnokkang on 26 May 1951

Hanson's second deployment to Korea, from September 1951 to May 1952, took her along Korea's east coast as a unit of the fleet bombarding strategic shore targets in support of ground troops. Hanson aided the rescue of the soldiers and marines of the Chosin Reservoir, referred to as the "Frozen Chosin". As part of a unit detached from Task Force 77, two destroyers — Ernest G. Small and Hanson — cruiser Helena and battleship Missouri, were sent on a gun strike in Hŭngnam harbor. Hanson, along with the Helena, received instructions to destroy railroad movements along the Korean coast. Helena would bombard one end of a railroad tunnel as the train entered it and Hanson would bombard the other end once the train was within the tunnel. Immediately afterward North Korean work crews would descend upon the railroad tracks and tunnels to repair the damage. Hanson would then call in carrier planes armed with napalm to bomb the work crews. At another time, Earnest G. Small and Missouri stayed a few miles off shore. Helena and Hanson were firing at targets close to the harbor, taking instructions from spotters on shore. As evening approached Hanson's gyro was failing which meant Hanson could not fire on targets accurately. Earnest G. Small was ordered to take over Hanson's close in position and Hanson move out to the position of Missouri. Earnest G. Small steamed toward Hanson's former position and less than 5 minutes at 18:01 hours 7 October 1951, Earnest G. Small struck a mine and lost 1/3 of their ship, with the entire bow blown off. Nine men were killed and 51 wounded. The ship had to retire to Sasebo by sailing astern to make repairs for return to the States. Hanson continued her practice of sinking minelayers disguised as fishing vessels. Hanson sank at least one such boat. On 22 October 1951, an AD-4W Navy aircraft of Composite Squadron VC-11 took a night landing wave off on the Antietam; the aircraft lost power and crashed into the sea. Hanson rescued the three crew members. In December she also participated in the important Formosa Patrol and visited Hong Kong for leave. On the way to Hong Kong, Hanson encountered a huge typhoon, with 30-foot waves crashing in a north–south direction. The sonar team aboard Hanson also located a submerged vessel in the shallow portion of the Formosa Straits. Its location was reported to 7th Fleet command. Hanson was told that this was the WWII sub Tang which was sunk by its own torpedo. With her leave in Hong Kong complete, she returned to Korea. Hanson would use her radar and ECM gear to help US Army rangers in their attempts to carry out operations behind enemy lines and give them naval gunfire support. On 25 December 1951, Hanson was back in Sasebo, Japan, for two days. On 27 December 1951, Hanson became part of Task Element 95.11, relieving the Porterfield. The Task Element was made up of many British Commonwealth ships, including Athabaskan (R79) and Charity (R29), as well as the U.S. escort carrier Badoeng Strait. Operating in the Wonsan area on April 10, TF-77 carried out a coordinated strike using the guns of Saint Paul and Hanson.

Hanson was relieved of her deployment in the Korean War and she returned to Sasebo to start the journey to San Diego, arriving there in May 1952. After a respite at San Diego, Hanson returned to Korea in December 1952, for task force operations, screening the fast carriers as they launched their aircraft against enemy supply lines and positions. The battle-hardened destroyer also participated in shore bombardment, search-and-rescue (SAR) operations, and Formosa patrols before returning to the United States on 20 July 1953, shortly before the signing of the Korean Armistice Agreement.

Subsequent years found Hanson making annual six-month deployments with the 7th Fleet to strengthen American defenses in the Pacific and to reinforce the American determination to keep the peace to possible aggressors. In addition to patrol, major portions of Hanson's Pacific deployments were devoted to tactical maneuvers and battle exercises with United States and allied ships as well as intensive antisubmarine hunter-killer training. Hong Kong, Taiwan, Japan, the Philippines, Korea, and even Australia provided familiar ports of call for the destroyer on these deployments. Hanson was patrolling the Straits of Formosa in the fall of 1958, as shelling of the offshore islands of Quemoy and Matsu precipitated a major international crisis.

In the spring of 1962 and 1963, Hanson took part in the annual Australian celebration of the Battle of the Coral Sea, World War II's first carrier naval engagement in the Pacific.

When not deployed to the western Pacific, Hanson trained out of her home port, San Diego. Much of this training was centered on Hanson's role as a radar picket destroyer, designed to provide early warning of approaching enemy air, surface, or submarine forces. On 1 April 1964, she was redesignated DD-832 and entered the San Francisco Naval Shipyard to undergo a Fleet Rehabilitation and Modernization (FRAM MK I) conversion designed to prolong her effective life as a fighting ship for many years.

==== Vietnam War ====
With her conversion was completed on 6 December 1964, Hanson rejoined the Pacific Fleet early in 1965 as a unit of Destroyer Squadron 11 (DesRon 11), with her sister ship Dennis J. Buckley, which was also a recent convert from the DDR configuration. Hanson operated along the West Coast until heading to the Far East early in the summer to the Vietnam War. In July she shelled enemy targets ashore and patrolled and fought in Vietnamese waters until late in the autumn.

Returning to San Diego in December, she operated along the coast of California and Mexico until getting returning to Vietnam on 17 July 1966. She steamed via Hawaii, Midway, Guam, and Subic Bay to Vietnam and anchored in the Saigon River on 13 September. Except for some short visits to Hong Kong, Formosa, and the Philippines, Hanson was on deployment in Vietnam until she was relieved on 6 January 1967. During her deployment, her 5-inch guns fired over 9,000 rounds at NVA targets, mostly in direct support of ground forces. She also performed plane guard duty, patrolled close ashore to stop infiltration of supplies and men from the north, and refueled helicopters.

Back at San Diego on 11 February 1967, Hanson operated along the West Coast preparing for her next deployment. During this period, six months were spent in Long Beach Naval Shipyard undergoing repairs and overhaul.

Hanson's third deployment to Vietnam was from March to September 1968. Notably, this deployment was moved up in order to quickly reinforce the Sea of Japan, where North Korean naval forces had recently (23 January 1968) intercepted and captured Pueblo in international waters off the coast of North Korea. As part of Operation Formation Star, Hanson's appearance in the area did not elicit any material response from the North Koreans, and after several days, she sailed south to join the rest of the United States 7th Fleet off Vietnam in the South China Sea. An assignment of note during this period was the NGFS firing on Dong Hoi, a coastal city located just north of the DMZ. It was the first actual shelling of any North Vietnam position since commencement of the war. Owing to the lack of any useful ground intelligence of targets in the area, no secondary explosions were observed. Hanson returned to San Diego in September.

Hanson was in port until 23 June 1969. On that date, in the company of Dennis J. Buckley and Hull, the ship was underway for her Operational Readiness Inspection (ORI). Upon successful completion, she returned to San Diego and remained there until her fourth deployment to Vietnam.

On 2 August Hanson set sail, accompanied by Dennis J. Buckley, Jouett and Boyd. The four ships left San Diego Harbor in a diamond formation, steaming under the new San Diego-Coronado Bridge during the opening ceremonies. Early on 3 August, the ships rendezvoused with Hancock. COMCARDIV NINE in Hancock became SOPA. The three destroyers and the guided missile frigate comprised Task Unit 17.4.2.

For her first assignment, Hanson left Subic Bay, in company with Hancock and Dennis J. Buckley as Task Group 77.4. The Task Group arrived at Yankee Station on 1 September, and the carrier immediately began flight operations with the two destroyers in plane guard stations. Dennis J. Buckley was given a brief assignment in the II Corps Tactical Zone area of the Republic of Vietnam for Naval Gunfire Support duties. The ship followed Hancock for a total of eight days. On 13 September, she again detached to assist in the transfer of a UPI correspondent to an ocean fleet ocean tug keeping surveillance on a Soviet trawler. Hanson departed YANKEE Station on 17 September and John W. Thomason assumed duties as Commander Task Unit 77.4.2.

On 17 January 1970, Hanson was en route to Da Nang Harbor for replenishment with the USS Niagara Falls that was anchored in the Da Nang Harbor. Vertical replenishment was completed, and Hanson left Da Nang Harbor en route to Point Allison.

On 24 January 1970, Hanson was in port Subic Bay with Jouett, Floyd B. Parks, and Dennis J. Buckley, which together formed TU70.0.3. On 25 January, TU70.0.3 was underway for San Diego, via Guam and Pearl Harbor, OTC was COMDESRON ONE embarked in Jouett. The four ships navigated the San Bernardino Straits on 26 January, and arrived on the morning of 28 January at Guam for a brief refueling stop. Within four hours the four ships set sail again on an easterly course for Pearl Harbor. On 31 January, the Task Unit Chopped to Commander First Fleet becoming TU15.9.2. On 1 February, Hull joined the formation. The five vessels moored in Pearl Harbor on 5 February, for two days before beginning the final leg of their homeward voyage. On the morning of 12 February, Hanson, Dennis J. Buckley, and Hull and other units of TU15.9.2 moored at US Naval Station San Diego.

On 10 July 1970, Hanson entered dry dock #3 at Hunter's Point Shipyard, San Francisco, with the Dubuque and remained there until 21 August 1970. While Hanson was in dry dock one night sometime around 22:30, the berthing compartment below the main deck level, around the mount 52 ammo handling room, started flooding due to a cracked or broken water main. The water rose to knee deep in the berthing space and halfway filled the after magazine. This caused the entire duty section to work until about 04:30 to pump out water from the after magazine and berthing compartments. On Hanson's shakedown cruise out of dry dock, a fire broke out in a boiler room, causing the ship to go to general quarters to fight the fire. This happened about eight hours into the shakedown cruise while steaming off San Francisco. B division handily and speedily put out the fire using purple K (PKP) fire suppressor.

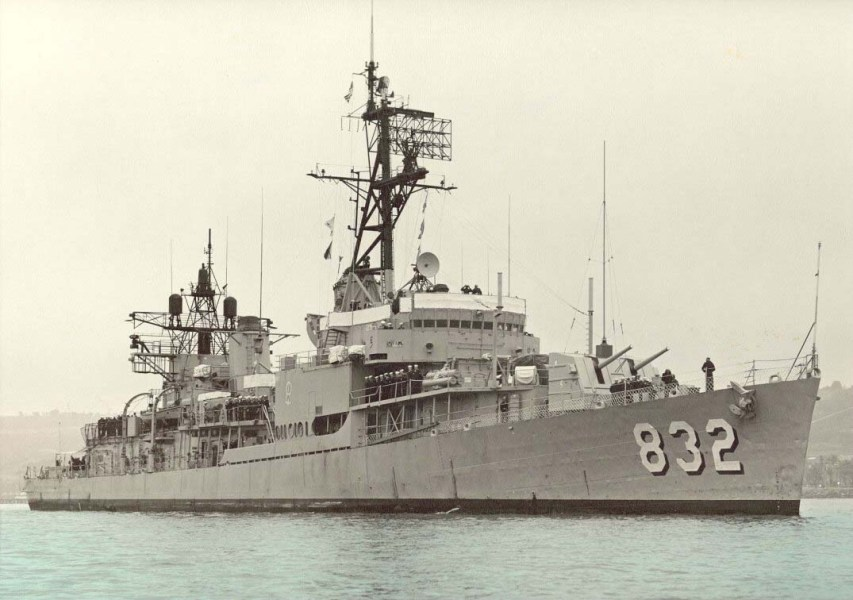
Hanson entering San Diego harbor in October 1970

Hanson arrived in San Diego, on about 18 October, for a short two-day stay before getting underway for independent steaming exercises on around 20 October. On about 21 October, the ship underwent sonar tests at the Fleet Operational Readiness Accuracy Check Site (FORACS) range at Wilson Cove, San Clemente Island. The ship was then in port in San Diego, from 22 October to mid November, with a tender availability, probably the Dixie, from 23 October to 5 November. Hanson participated in six weeks of refresher training commencing on 9 November, and the ship was in and out of port almost daily as a unit of TU54.l.l until about 18 December. Gunnery personnel conducted shore bombardment on San Clemente Island and air and surface firings at towed targets. Hanson conducted several underway replenishment operations with a USN oiler. The anti-submarine team fired exercise anti-submarine rockets (ASROC) and Mk 32 torpedoes at Salmon. The operations department conducted numerous exercises with Dennis J. Buckley and Gray. The rest of the year was spent in leave and upkeep in San Diego with a tender availability, probably the Prairie.

On 5 February 1971 Hanson, Dennis J. Buckley and Floyd B. Parks departed San Diego, for her fifth 6-month deployment to Vietnam. While about three days into the transit from San Diego to Pearl Harbor the three ships encountered a large floating buoy or pipe sealed on its ends floating upright, which was noticed on all three ships' radars as the sail of a surfaced submarine. On 12 February 1971, Hanson entered Pearl Harbor, just in time for a weekend stay. However, while Hanson was mooring, she closed faster than expected into her berthing space and struck Carpenter. First Div or deck crew was then obligated to paint over the scuffed paint of Carpenter's port side front hull and her bulwarks. Also Hanson's paint had to be tidied up on her starboard side. Hanson left Pearl Harbor, on 15 February, for Midway Island. A few days later Hanson, along with the rest of Desron 1, moored at Midway Island, refueled, and spent about four hours playing softball before heading to Guam. On 18 February 1971, while steaming between Midway Island and Guam, the three ships encounter a heavy typhoon creating 25-foot waves, sometimes reaching 70 feet. At crew's breakfast a Hanson crewman, who was on the signal bridge, was swept overboard. Another crew member, a port bridge lookout, just happened to see the man falling by the bridge wing window and he immediately sounded the alarm and threw a life ring into the sea where the man was floating. All three ships responded immediately but Hanson rescued him in less than 15 minutes. Hanson steamed on to Guam and released the rescued crew member to be sent to a hospital, refueled and continued her journey to Subic Bay.

Hanson ports of call included Pearl Harbor, Midway Island, Apra Harbor in Guam, Subic Bay, Philippines, Da Nang, South Vietnam, Bangkok, Thailand, Buckner Bay, Okinawa, Japan, Sasebo, Japan, Pusan, South Korea, Yokosuka, Japan, Shimoda, Japan and British Colony of Hong Kong.

Hanson traveled to the Philippine Sea to avoid a typhoon (the storm raged on 9 March 1971 during the Ali-Frasier fight) and then moved into Da Nang to meet with advisors there to receive instructions for naval gunfire support. Hanson stayed in Da Nang harbor for about four hours and then headed to her position along the coast where she spent about one to one and a half weeks providing gunfire support. Most, if not all, firing took place at night and not more than twenty rounds were fired during each evening or session. Hanson then got orders to proceed to Bangkok, Thailand, for a week of leave. After one week in Bangkok, Hanson headed back to Subic Bay for a short stay and to ready for a trip northward toward Taiwan, the Ryukyu islands, and then Japan and Korea.

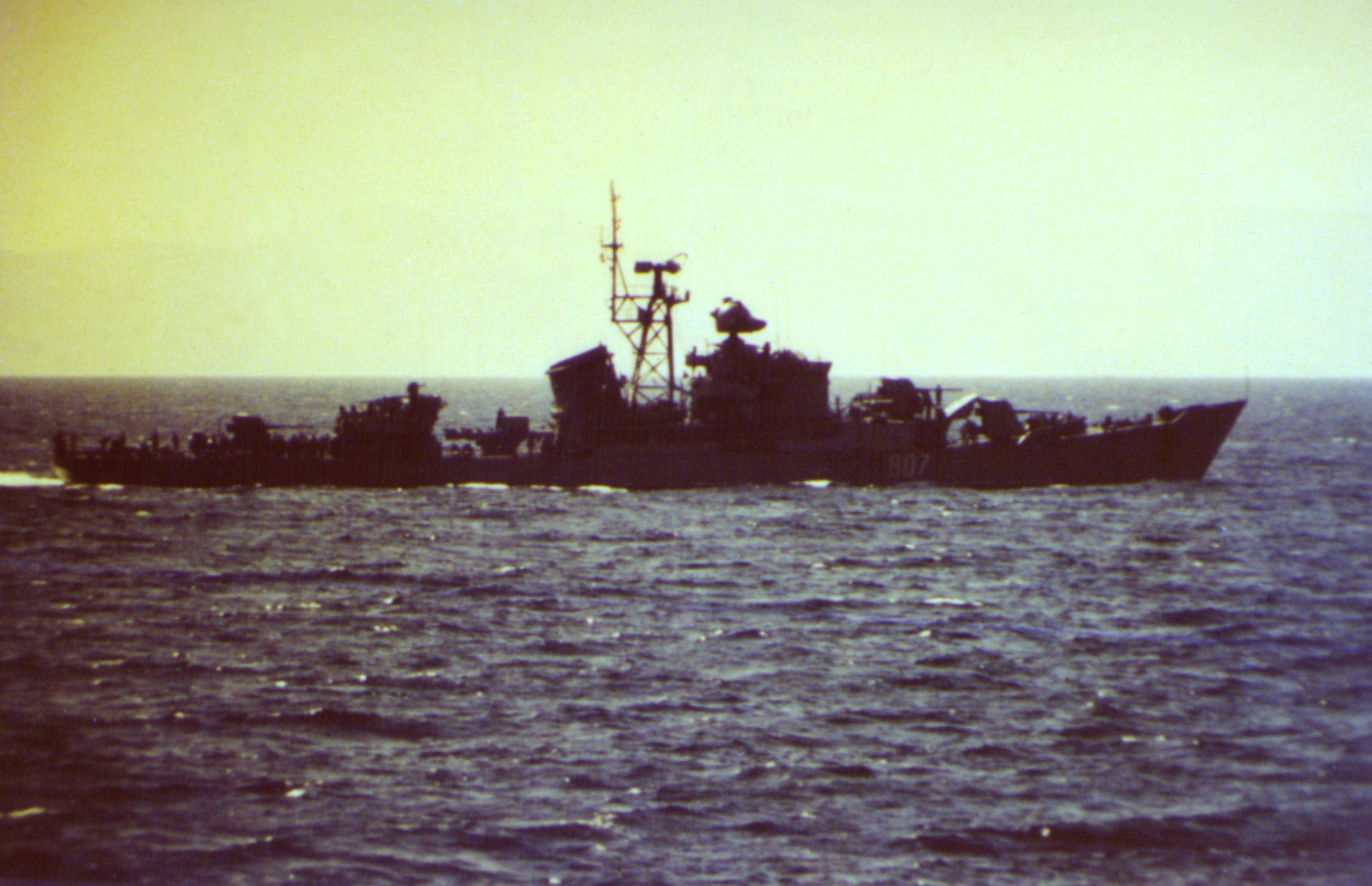
Russian Riga-class frigate in Ryukyu islands, 1971

Hanson, while transiting from Subic Bay, Philippines, to Okinawa, Japan through the Ryukyu island chain encountered a Russian Riga Class Frigate (hull number 807) moving at a speed of 22 kn or more. When Hanson made Buckner Bay, Okinawa, she refueled and headed for Sasebo, Japan. Once in Sasebo, Hanson stayed for several days.

Transiting from Sasebo to Pusan, Hanson met with Truxtun and lowered its motor whale boat to transfer a commodore and his staff from Truxtun to Hanson prior to entering Pusan, South Korea. The commodore was piped aboard, with sideboys stationed on the quarterdeck. About 26 April, Hanson steamed into Pusan, Korea for a two and a half day stopover, then steamed back to Sasebo, Japan.

Hanson stayed in Sasebo for two days before sailing into the Korean Strait and Sea of Japan to observe and report on Soviet and North Korean ship movements. For about three or four days Hanson's deployment went smoothly until she came upon a group of fleet tugs towing dry docks. Hanson was following the Russian tugs. On 6 May 1971, Hanson collided with one of the Soviet Navy's fleet tugs. The tugs were headed north, perhaps to a Russian port, when one of the tugs (said to be the Diomede) fell back and came along the starboard side of Hanson. The two ships were traveling around 12 knots and 150 feet apart. Hanson's bridge crew attempted to hail the tug via a bullhorn, but the tug turned and struck Hanson near her anchor. While no injuries were reported, and Hanson received little damage, the tug lost at least 30 feet of its port side main deck railing or lifeline. Hanson immediately went to general quarters and film of the incident was collected from crew members as evidence of the international incident. This was a third and final collision that occurred prior to signing of the Incidents at Sea Agreement in 1972, and was officially between Hanson and the Soviet tug Diomede in the Korean Strait on 5 May 1971. This minor collision, which was caused by the Soviet tug violating the nautical rules, did not have serious repercussions for Soviet-American relations. Hanson then made way for Yokosuka, Japan, for repairs and cooling of Soviet-US Navy tensions. She remained in Yokosuka for about ten days. During her stay in Yokosuka, a marching group composed of at least two crew members per division was selected and the group, in the command of one of the ship's officers, practiced for half a day on the pier to prepare for the Black Ship Festival in Shimoda, Japan.

Around 14 to 16 May, Hanson, Preble and Heywood L. Edwards participated in the Black Ship Festival held yearly in mid-May in Shimoda, Japan. Each ship participated by entering marching units that paraded through the narrow streets of Shimoda, Japan. After her time in Shimoda, Hanson headed to Sasebo for ship maintenance.

For at least two weeks Hanson conducted naval gunfire support off Vietnam, refueled helicopters in need of fuel, participated in plane guard duty at Yankee station in the Tonkin Gulf off Vietnam, and trailed Soviet vessels operating in the Sea of Japan.

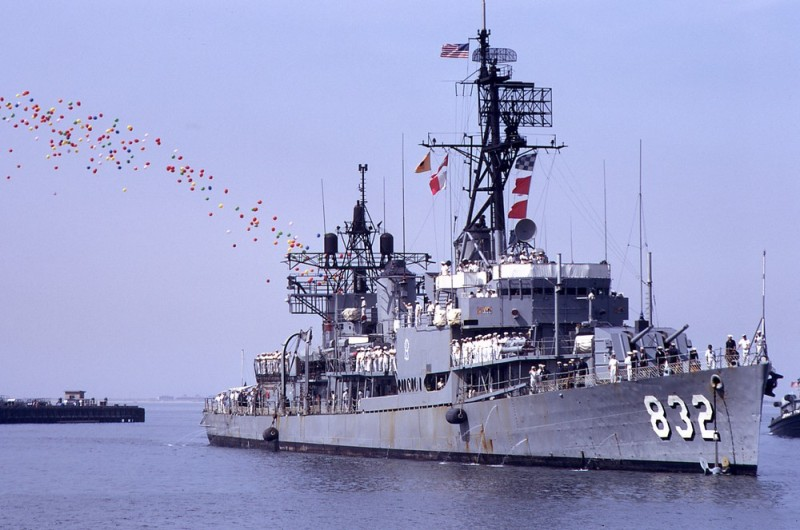
Hanson returning to San Diego in 1971, after her fifth Vietnam Deployment.

On 16 July, Hanson in company with Dennis J. Buckley departed Subic Bay, with her deployment completed she headed to San Diego. In Guam, Dennis J. Buckley and Hanson were joined by Floyd B. Parks. An underwater investigation revealed that one of the blades on the starboard propeller of Floyd B. Parks had broken off so Floyd B. Parks set for Guam on one propeller. In Guam, divers removed the damaged propeller and at midnight 22 July, Floyd B. Parks proceeded to Pearl Harbor on one shaft in company with Hanson and Dennis J. Buckley. Due to bad weather and schedule commitments, Midway was bypassed in favor of a great circle track to Pearl Harbor. The long journey was highlighted by an underway replenishment on the International Date Line with a fleet oiler on its way to the Western Pacific.

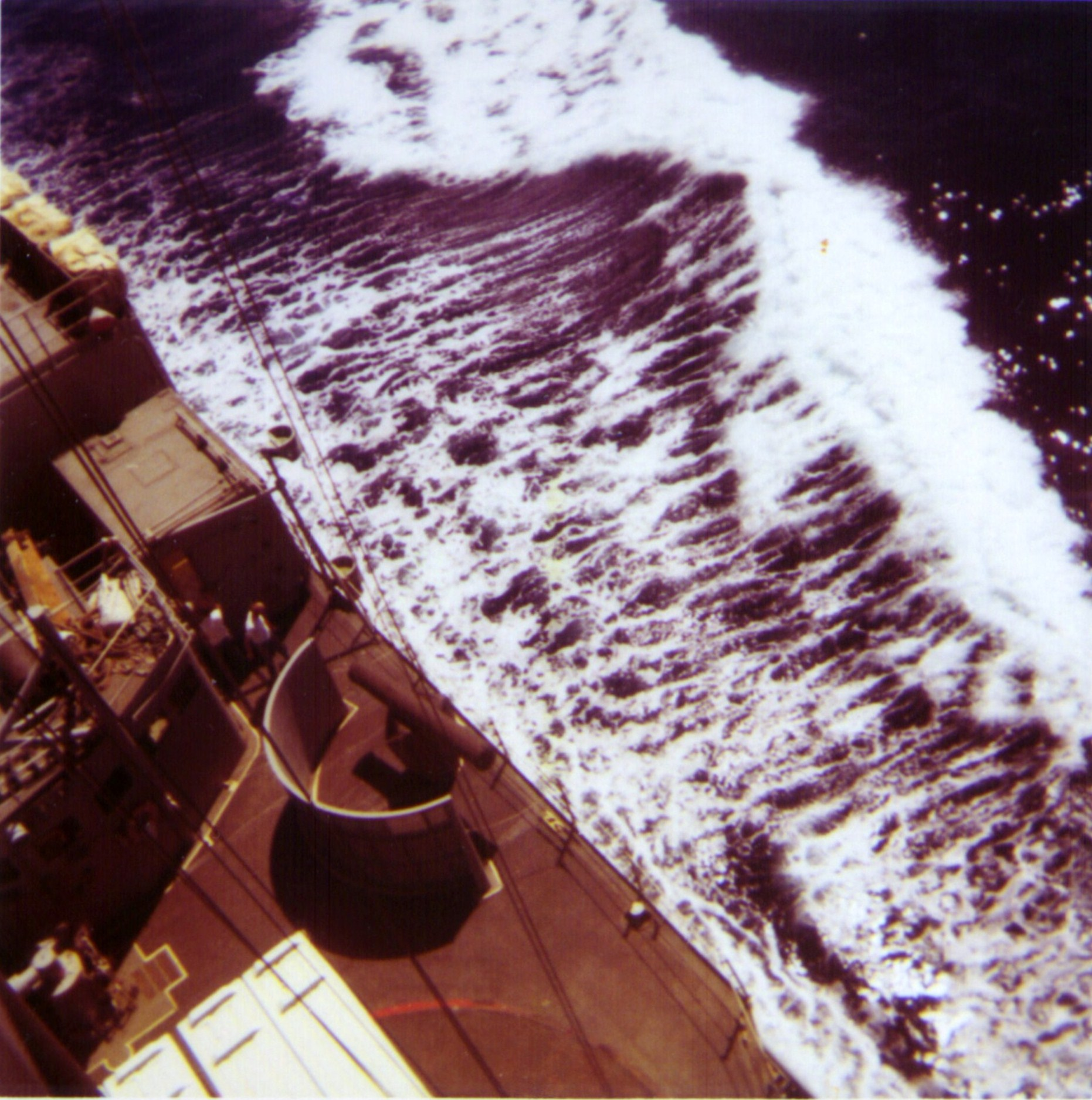
Hanson SAMID installation as viewed from SPS-37 radar platform in May 1971. Electronics package contained within HUT (AN/SLQ19-B), 2 antennas per side or 4 total, two CHAFFROC launchers with blast shields.

Hanson, Dennis J. Buckley, and Floyd B. Parks arrived in Pearl Harbor, on 29 July. Floyd B. Parks received a new propeller and at midnight 30 July began a great circle route for San Diego in order to catch up to Dennis J. Buckley and Hanson who left ahead of Floyd B. Parks. Floyd B. Parks met the other destroyers at the entrance to San Diego Harbor after a four-day chase and arrived home on schedule on 4 August. Hanson officially returned to San Diego, on 4 August 1971, after a full 6-month deployment.

The next month was spent in a "stand down" status with the crew working half days while most took some leave. The only major work was a change in her Electronic Warfare (EW) configuration. The SAMID Immediate Package Program (designed by RCA) consisting of 2 ASROC deck mounted CHAFFROC launchers with blast shields, ASROC deck mounted SAMID HUT (AN/SLQ-19 B) electronics package, and support antennas mounted on port and starboard sides at the ASROC & after-ECM 02 deck level, was removed from Hanson. In November, Hanson followed Hancock just out of San Francisco, for plane guard duties lasting about 1 week before Thanksgiving Day of November 1971. After her plane guard duty with Hancock of about 1 week, Hanson returned to San Diego.

In the early part of 1972, Hanson engaged in refreshment training, readiness inspections, repair and maintenance. The captain at one point decided to have a crew and dependents fish fry on the fantail at a spot off San Diego. The ship sailed to Acapulco, Mexico, for a two-week leave. On her return to San Diego Hanson received a radio message from a hospital in Puerto Vallarta, Mexico, requesting some medicine of which they were in short supply. Hanson entered the Mexican port and met a small boat and gave them the medicine. Hanson then continued on her way to San Diego.

==== 1972 transit to the Gulf of Tonkin ====
On 10 April 1972, with only 3 days notice Hanson got underway for WestPac. Accompanying Hanson en route were John S. McCain and Dennis J. Buckley, to fight the North Vietnamese Easter Offensive in Vietnam, as its 6th and final tour of Vietnam service. This final tour of duty would also be Hanson's most engaging wartime effort as a US Naval vessel. The Destroyer squadron made Pearl Harbor, about 15 April, entered port, refueled and then left the harbor within three hours of arriving. Hanson headed westward to Guam, arriving by April 23. The three ships refueled within three hours and then headed to Subic Bay, Philippines. During transit between Guam and the Philippines, a Soviet Tupolev Tu-95 "Bear" reconnaissance aircraft flew over at a low altitude, due to low cloud cover, and passed abeam (starboard side of the three ships) within about 200 yards. Hanson arrived in Subic, about 26 April 1972.

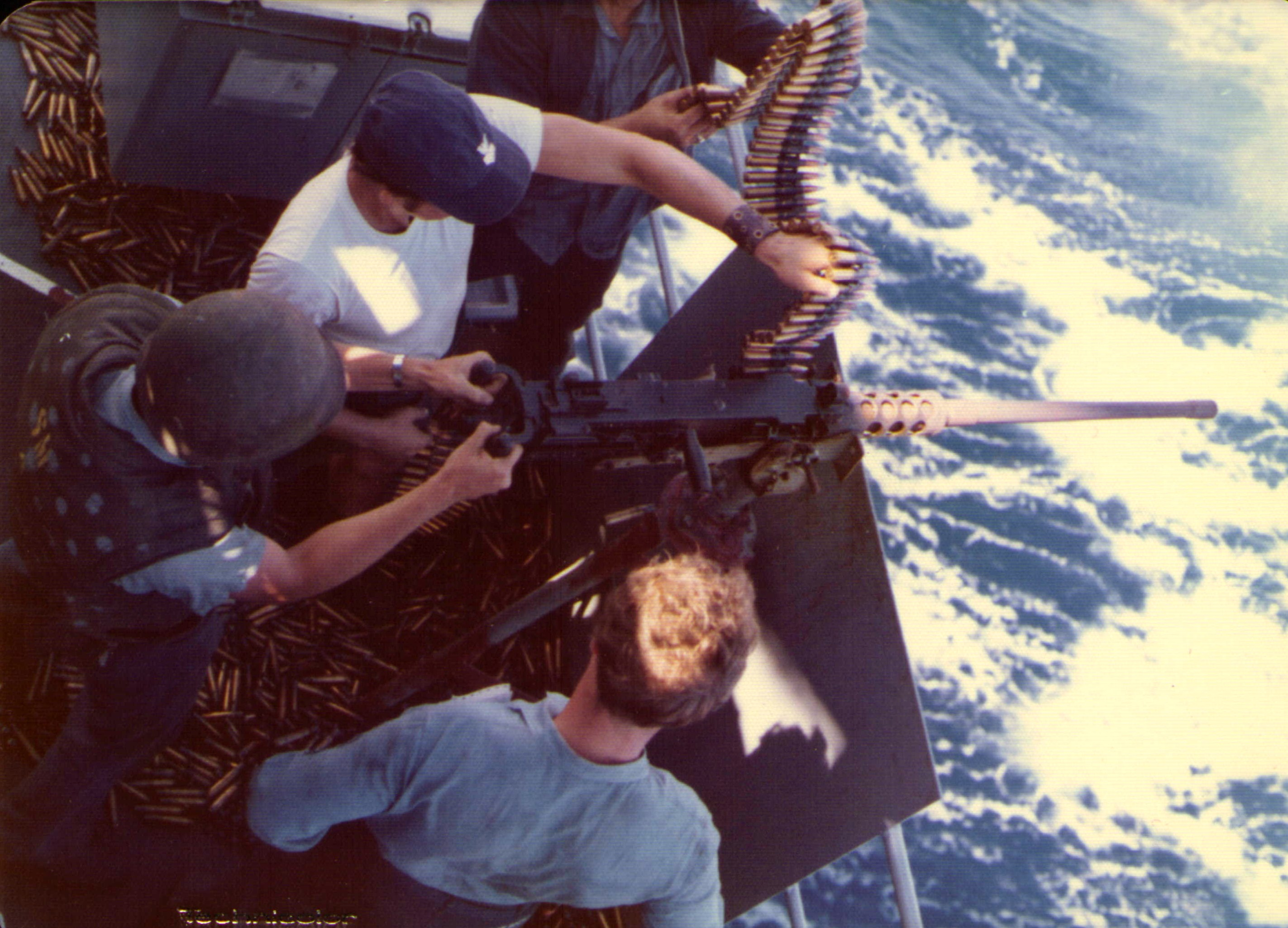
Hanson, 1972 Tonkin Gulf M2 50 cal machine gun used for warding off PT boats and small boats.

Once Hanson arrived at Subic Bay, decisions were made to add some armament to protect the ship from hazards in the Tonkin Gulf. Mainly, two M2 Browning machine guns mounted on the bridge wings for boats armed with rockets and shoulder-launched Redeye surface-to-air missiles. Hanson had no reliable way to ward off MIG attacks. This added precaution arose primarily due to the Battle of Đồng Hới on 19 April.

==== 1972 Gulf of Tonkin ====
On 30 April 1972, Hanson entered Tonkin Gulf off Vietnam and received orders from CincPacFlt to proceed to the waters off North Vietnam. When transiting to the Northern part of the gulf, Hanson met up with Richard B. Anderson. Anderson steamed at Hanson's port side, the barrels of her guns were completely blackened and the front part of her mounts were black with red lead exposed. Only the after part of both the gun mounts were still painted in USN haze gray. Hanson crew could now see what they were getting into as displayed by the condition of Richard B. Anderson's guns. On 4 May 1972, Hanson moved further north for front line combat action in Operation Freedom Train (later called "Operation Linebacker") and engaged in a series of daring raids on the Haiphong complex, which included support for Operation Pocket Money on 9 May 1972. During her second raid on the night of 4 May 1972, Hanson was hit by an artillery shell that damaged the ship's water purification system.

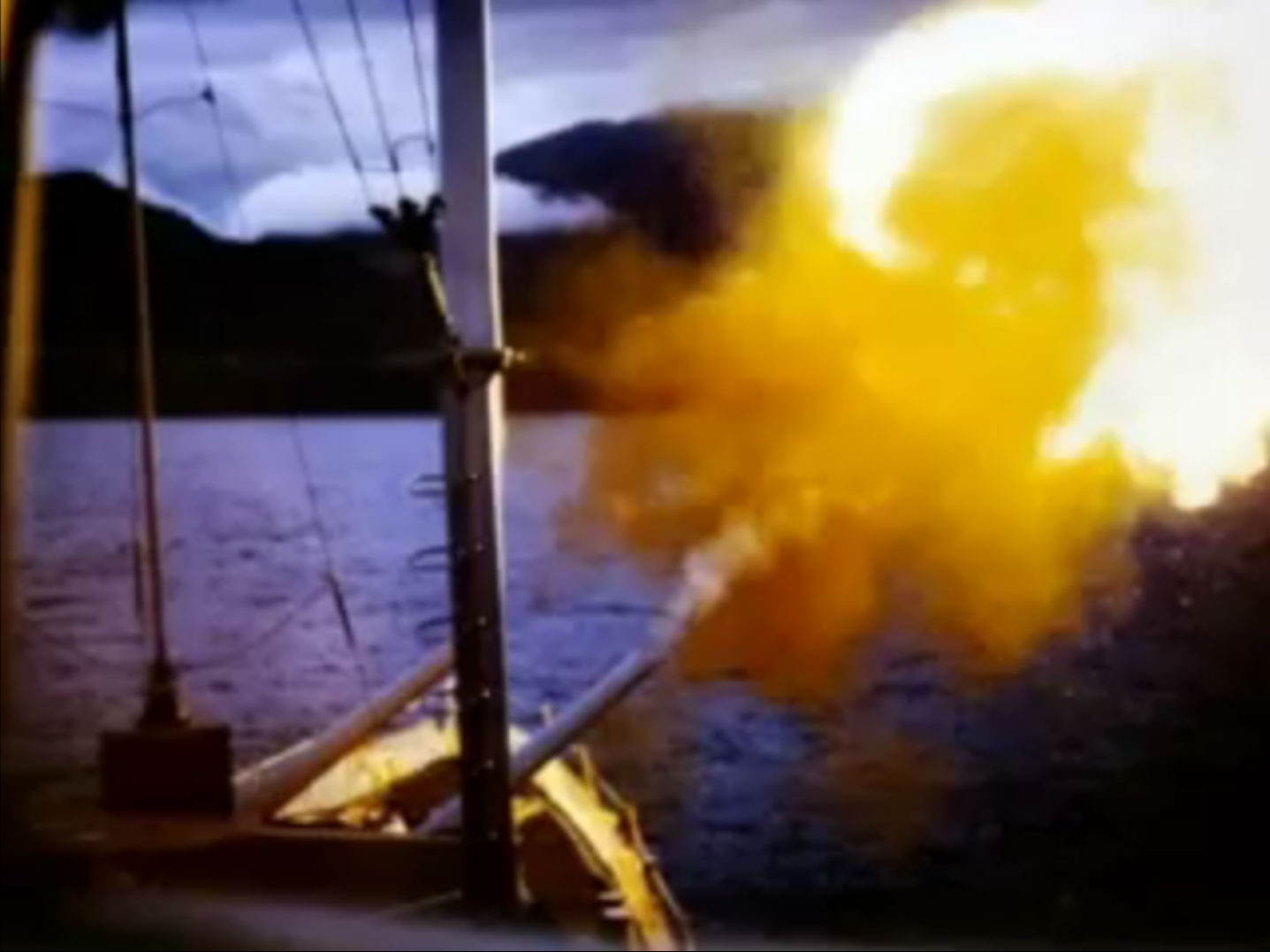
Hanson firing mount 51 near sunset. From both Mnt 51 & 52 Hanson fired 14,486 rounds of 5" 38 HC, RAP & WP ammo.

On 8 May, Admirals Robinson and Cooper were returning from a meeting aboard Coral Sea as their helicopter crashed (one engine failed) while heading to Providence, .

==== Operation Custom Tailor ====
On the night of 9–10 May 1972, Hanson, along with Myles C. Fox, Buchanan, Newport News, Providence, and Oklahoma City prepared to participate in Operation Custom Tailor at Do Son Peninsula, Haiphong, a follow-up of a similar raid made the night before. This was the most formidable cruiser/destroyer armada assembled in the Western Pacific since World War II. During this strike, Hanson entered the harbor and fired at military targets within four miles of Haiphong; enemy opposition was heavy. Hanson was both the last US naval vessel to enter Haiphong harbor prior to the mining of the harbor and the last ship out.

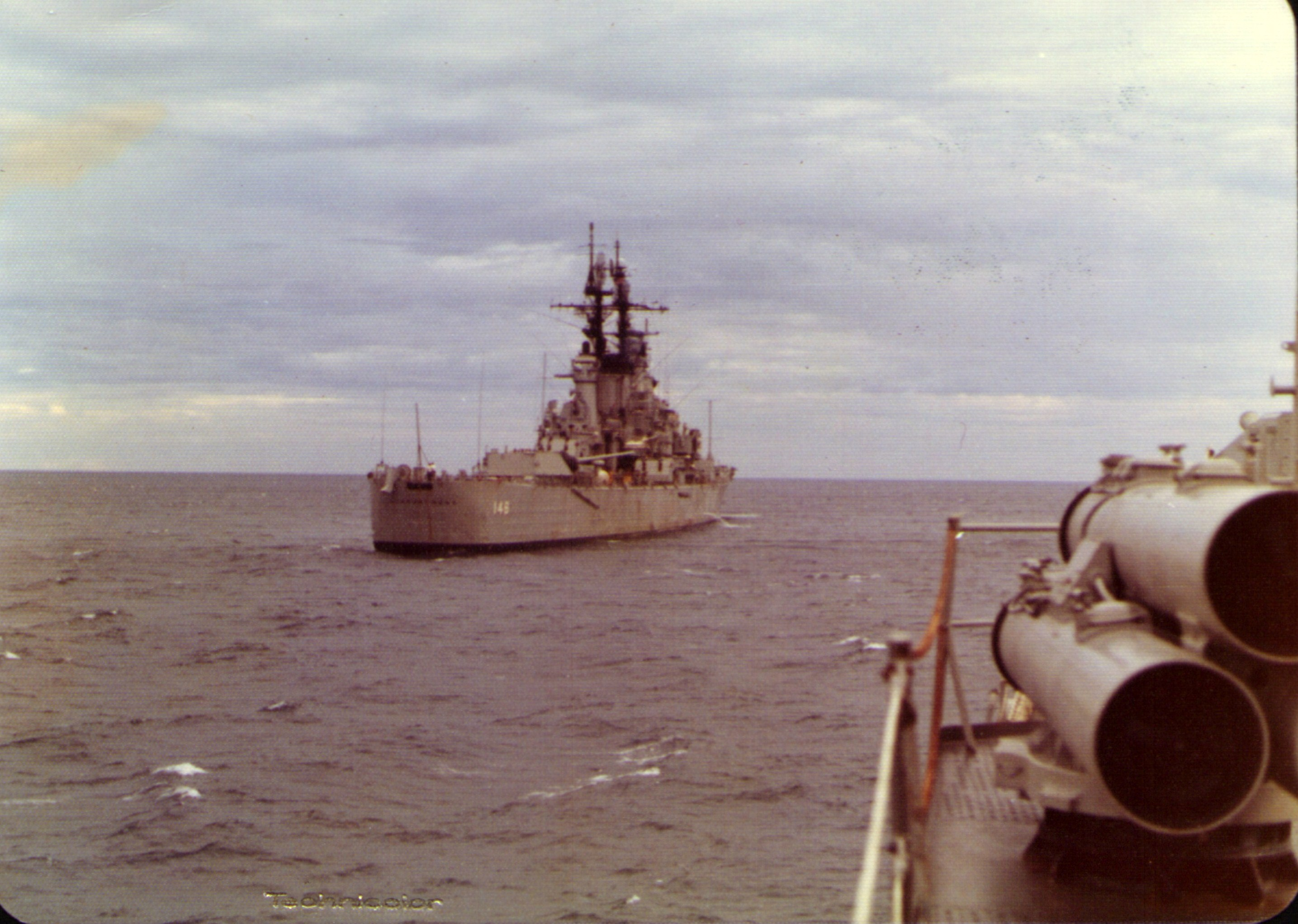
"Thunder" with "King City", 1972, Pt. Allison. 77 of the Newport News's massive 8-inch shells slammed into the military installations around Cat Bi.

Around 01:00 on 10 May 1971, DESRON 31, now comprising Buchanan, Myles C.Fox, and Hanson, spotted Newport News about 45 miles south of the Do Son Peninsula. The cruiser, whose call sign was "Thunder", had arrived in the Gulf of Tonkin the previous day after setting out from Norfolk on 13 April. Two other warships that would participate in the mission cruised nearby, Providence and Oklahoma City. At around 02:00 on 10 May, Newport News's commanding officer, Captain Walter F. Zartman, ordered the formation into a line abreast, Hanson to the far left, then Providence, Newport News, Oklahoma City, and Buchanan. Myles C. Fox was ordered farther to the northeast to act as a blocking element in case of enemy patrol-boat activity and to cover the rear of the formation when it would eventually turn to the west and onto a firing course. At 03:45, all five warships turned to the firing course of 240T, roughly parallel to the longitudinal axis of the Cat Bi airfield. At the extreme range of Newport News's 8-inch guns, the Cat Bi military complex was the raid's primary target. The completely darkened warships together commenced firing at 03:47. Seventy-seven of Newport News's massive 8-inch shells slammed into the military installations around Cat Bi, while hundreds of rounds from the 6-inch guns of the two light cruisers and 5-inch guns of the cruisers and two destroyers pounded enemy targets on the Do Son Peninsula. When shore batteries opened up, effective cruiser-destroyer counter-battery fire silenced them. Less than thirty minutes later, the action was over. Enemy fire had been somewhat more sporadic than the day before, and none of the ships was hit. Quite possibly the overwhelming fire from the cruisers and destroyers caused most of the North Vietnamese gunners to run for cover, and by the time they re-manned their positions, the task group was retiring. Still, the enemy had fired numerous 152-mm shells at the column of ships as they steamed past in the darkness, and the sailors in all the ships felt the shells' explosions.

==== 1972 daily routine in the Gulf of Tonkin ====
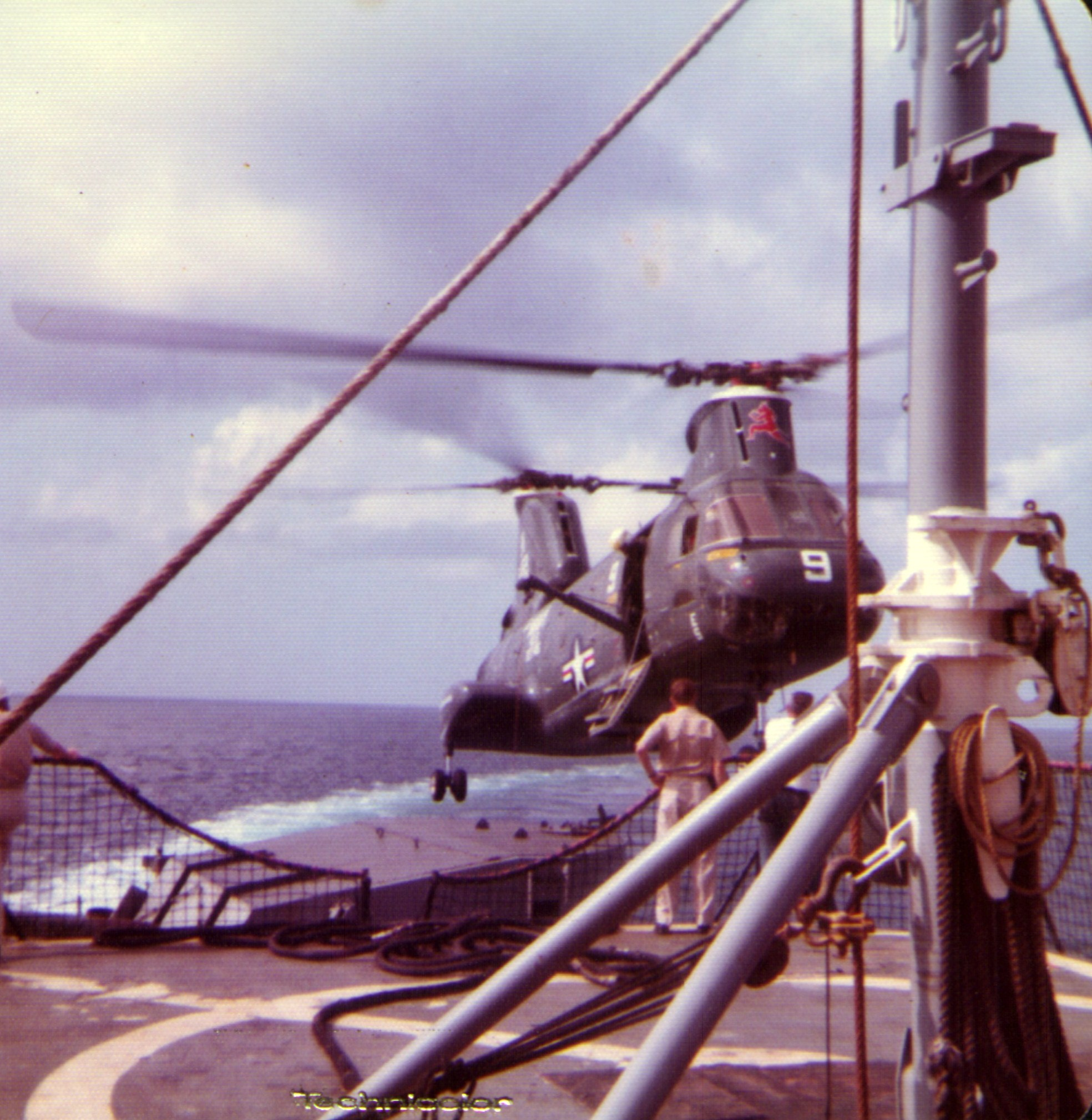
Hanson receiving or sending mail, parts or personnel via CH 46 Sea Knight helicopter in 1972

The raids continued from sunset to sunrise throughout May into June and sporadically at other times while Hanson took on fuel, supplies and ammunition during the day. Rearming and replenishment usually took from 2 to 4 hours every one and a half to two days. Nonetheless, ships routine had to continue; meals, cleanup, maintenance and repair of equipment subjected to long hours of continuous gun fire. The continual combat missions and replenishment kept her crew awake approximately 22 hours per day and the two hours of sleep the crew did get basically consisted of 5 or 10 minutes here and there. The ship remained on water hours during this long combat period in order to relieve the engineering department of making feed and drinking water. The only showers authorized were for those personnel working below decks in the engineering spaces. The rest of the ship's crew could only take "bird baths". Nightly, there were typically two to five General quarters periods usually lasting between one and two hours each usually under stress of possible or actual hostile fire. Every crew member was involved; Engineering department tending 4 steam boilers, powering Hanson's twin engines, gun crews loading heavy projectiles (55 lb) and gunpowder (15 lb) stored in magazines loading into hoists taking it up into the gun mounts where they are hand loaded into the gun breeches, ready to be fired. Gun director crews, plotters, navigators, CIC crews, and bridge lookouts straining their eyes watching for hostile surface or air contacts. Such times seemed to never end. At one point during Hanson's numerous firing engagements, her rear gun mount barrels had to be changed out in Da Nang by the repair ship USS Hector anchored in the harbor. Of course many other vessels of the fleet were present carrying out the same maintenance.

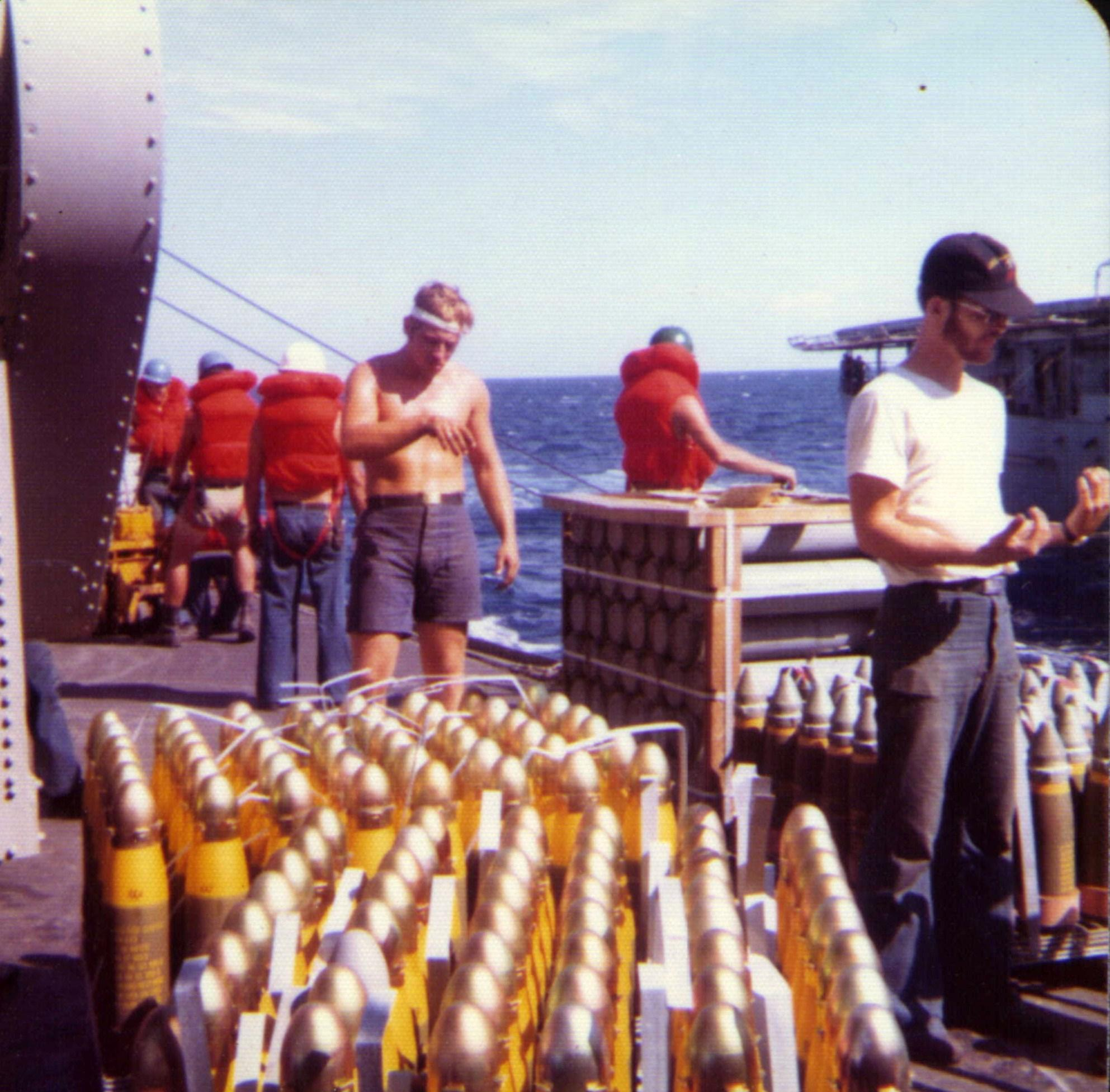
Hanson high line unrep of ammunition Tonkin Gulf in 1972

From 22 to 28 May, Hanson on three occasions moved into position and fired upon an area 30 to 35 miles northwest of Qui Nhon in support of ARVN 2nd Division and was credited with destroying 2 enemy emplacements, damaging 15 other enemy emplacements and on one bombardment the inflicted damage was inconclusive. Bausell accompanied Hanson during at least one of these bombardments.

On 24 May, as part of Operation Song Thanh (6-72), Hanson, along with other 7th Fleet ships took up position near US Navy amphibious assault ships, mainly Duluth, Cayuga near Wunder Beach southeast of Quảng Trị city. The two ships were part of the amphibious group which included Schenectady and Manitowoc. After an intense arc light raid by B-52s on the beach the ships launched amphibious tractors to land VNMC battalions. Duluth and Cayuga came under fire from a North Vietnamese shore battery. The battery was immediately fired upon by Hanson and other ships in the support group joined in to silence the batteries. Duluth then moved out of range under its own "black smoke".

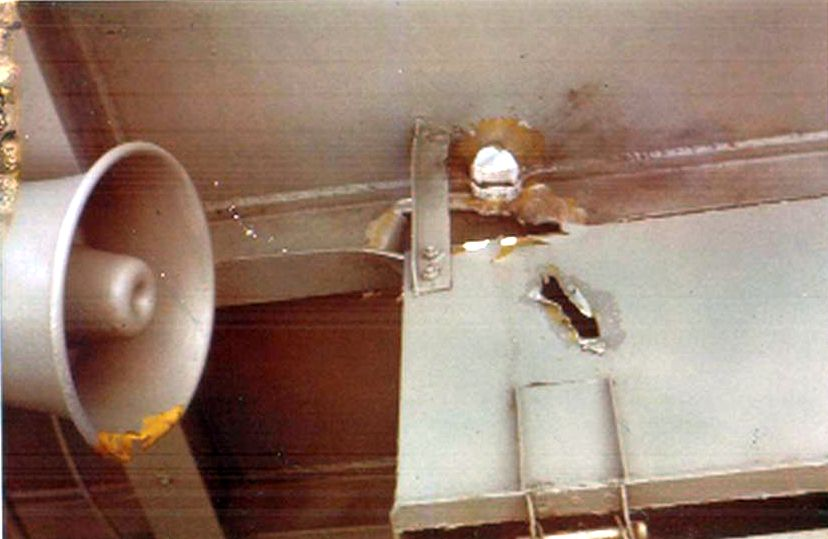
Rocket hit on Hanson in 1972

In June 1972 during night raids, Hanson dueled with North Vietnamese 152 millimeter coastal batteries near Hon La and Hon Mat islands. Hanson was struck twice during these duels on two separate occasions. The shells used by the North were anti-aircraft, so most of its battle damage was shrapnel punctures to the aluminum superstructure. Hanson took one such hit (night raid) which created at least 140-plus holes/breaks; on the starboard side from the after shower room (main deck level) forward up to the bridge on the 02 level. The hull technicians reported patching/repairing about 145 welds. During one early morning daylight raid Hanson was struck on the port side through the ASROC deck into a life jacket locker mounted in the overhead main deck by a 3-inch rocket, its armor-piercing warhead nearly hitting a damage control party in the main deck passageway. There were no injuries or loss of life aboard Hanson. During one tense night raid, Hanson was expecting trouble from small boats, and the .50 cal gun crews were put on the alert for any such threats.

During the raid the port bridge wing gun crew opened up on Hanson's port side at what they thought was a small boat, but it turned out to be a crew member of another destroyer smoking a cigarette. No one was injured and damage to the other destroyer was not significant.

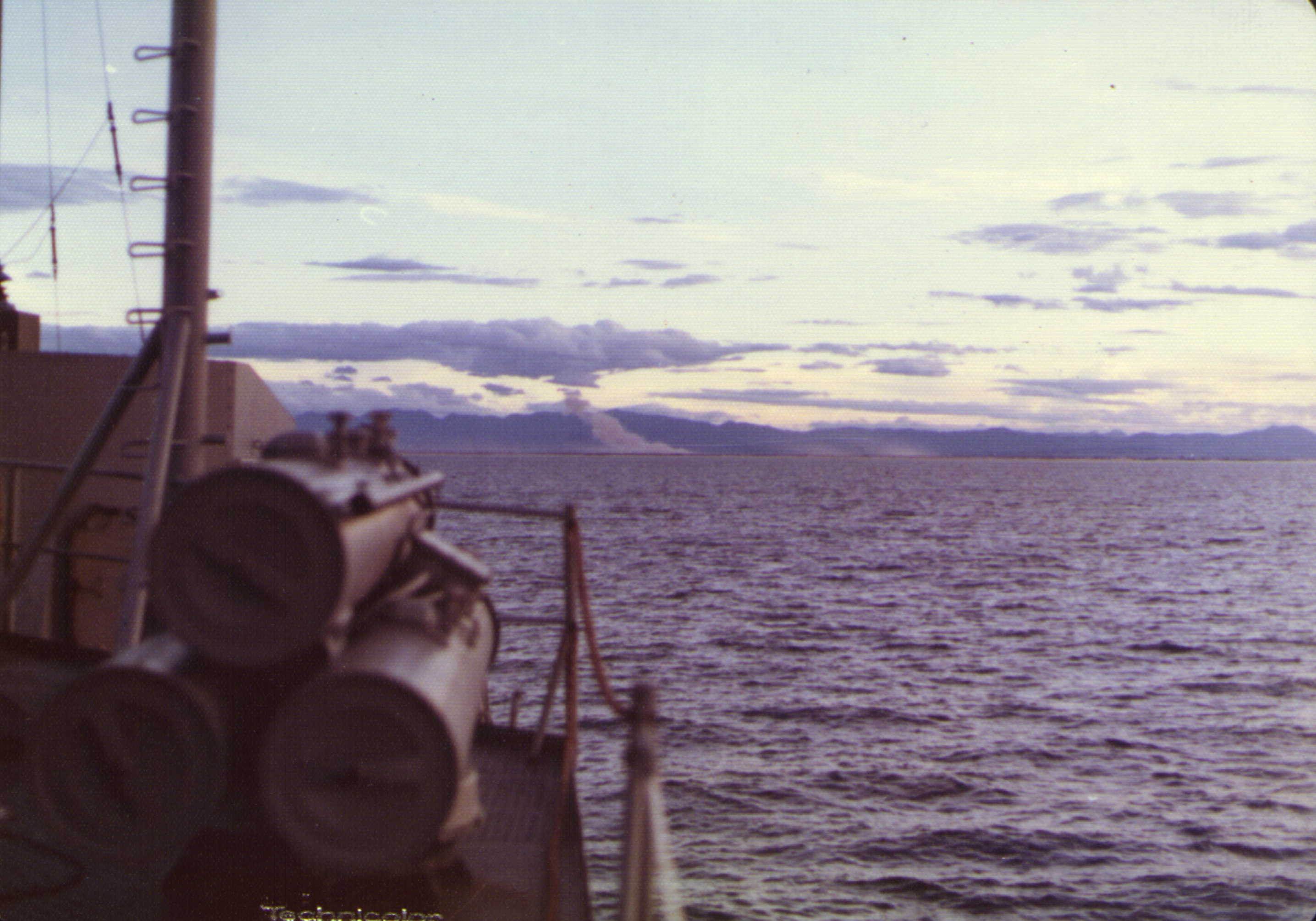
Hanson firing on North Vietnamese forces near Quang Tri

On 29 June 1972, Hanson was sent to Quảng Trị to support the movement of 1400 South Vietnamese Marines (VNMC 4th & 1st Battalions) along with USMC 9th MAB (Operation Lam Son 72 I) from Tam My to Quảng Trị to be conducted totally by CH-46s and CH-53s. Hanson arrived at just about midnight. There was an overcast and the moon and stars were not visible. At least 16 other US Navy cruisers, destroyers and destroyer escorts were present. Also present but to the east on the horizon were two LPHs (Tripoli and Okinawa), and LCC Blue Ridge, ready for a dawn launching of helicopters to the Tam My and Quảng Trị city areas. B-52s were arriving every 20 minutes over a location northwest of Hanson to unload tons of bombs that flashed and thundered throughout the night until the scheduled operation to occur at 08:00 on 29 June. The armada of ships then went to General Quarters (as published in Plan Of the Day) and the two LPHs launched their helicopters that headed inland at a low altitude (about 200 feet). About two hours into the operation, Hanson went to a relaxed General Quarters condition. All the ships were then available for Naval Gun Fire Support roles as the day (29 June) progressed. Hanson remained off Quảng Trị until 3 July. Hanson later steamed to just outside Da Nang harbor and met with a South Vietnamese (ARVN PTF- no709) which tied up alongside for the transfer of beer to the PBR for a July 4 celebration.

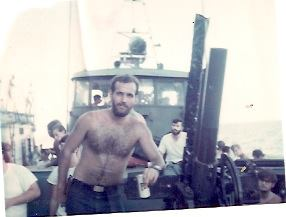
Gunboat tied to Hanson in Vietnam

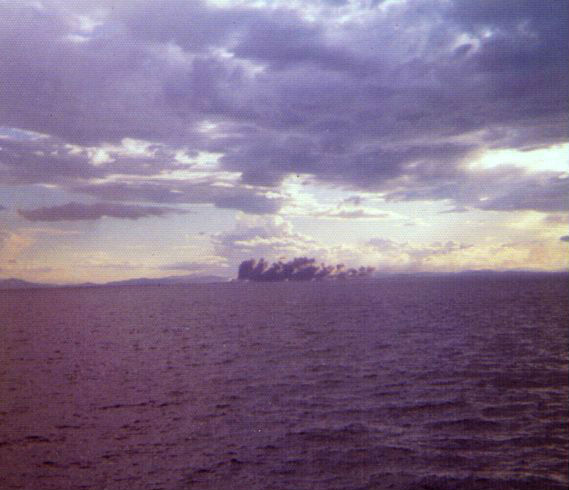
Hanson view of B52 Arc light, Quang Tri in 1972

From 1 to 4 July and 12 to 23 July, Hanson, in support of 1st VNMC Division and ARVN 3rd Division destroyed 49 structures and caused 14 secondary explosions.

In July 1972, Hanson lost her main gyro and steering engine and put in at Subic Bay in the Philippine Islands for repairs and returned to the combat theater.

From 8 to 21 August, Hanson supported the VNMC in the south of DMZ MR I destroying 11 structures, damaging 11 structures and causing 28 secondary explosions.

On 1 September, Hanson along with Saratoga steamed out of Subic Bay to return to the war zone. But Hanson's escort duties were brief as Hanson was relieved one day after leaving Subic to steam to a WBLC (Water Borne Logistics Interdiction) station off the coast of North Vietnam. However her arrival on station was temporarily delayed due to heavy seas and storm evasion that sent her south to avoid typhoon Elsie. Hanson weathered the storm and returned to her station on September 5. Hanson's WBLC duties turned out to uneventful and short lived. On 8 September, Hollister arrived on the scene and relieved Hanson. She headed south to participate in other operations including combat missions in Quảng Trị Province and plane guard for Midway.

On 13 September, Hanson was directed to proceed further south to the Chu Lai area to support ARVN forces and territorial forces. Soon another typhoon was headed in Hanson's way and she was forced to move out to ride out Typhoon Flossie. After the worst of the storm Hanson returned to the Chul Lai station on the evening of 16 September.

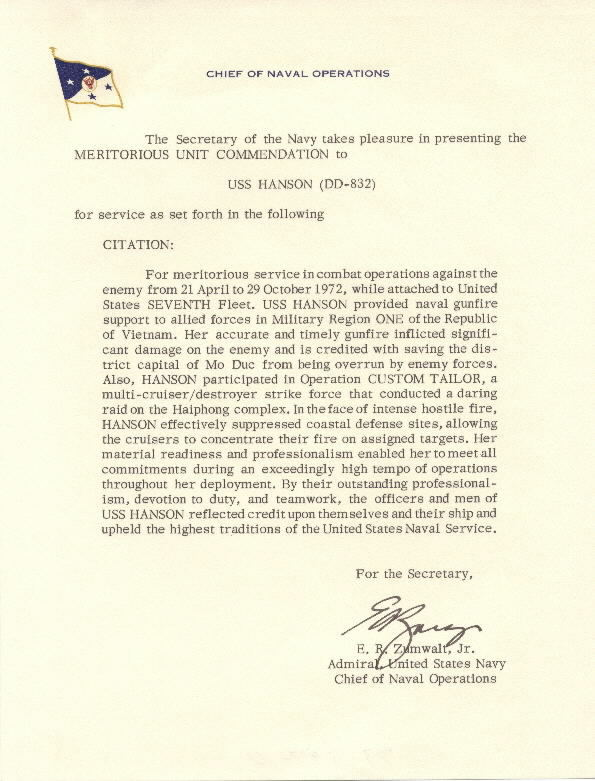
The Meritorious Unit Commendation was awarded to the crew of Hanson for the time period 21 April 1972 to 29 October 1972 including Mộ Đức and Operation Custom Tailor.

==== Battle of Mộ Đức ====
On 17 September 1972, Hanson received a report from Chu Lai spotters indicating Mộ Đức District was being overrun by some 1,000 (regiment size) enemy infantry. An Army detachment of 120 ARVN and two Americans were in Mộ Đức District defending their position, with the help of 20th TASS FAC Air Force Captains Richard L. Poling and Joseph Personnett (reconnaissance pilots flying an armed OV-10), and desperately needed heavy artillery support to prevent its garrison from being over run.

Hanson was the only gunship in the area (about 40 miles away), so it was ordered to get to the "center arena" of Mộ Đức as rapidly as possible. However, Hanson would need to travel as quickly as possible to arrive in a timely manner, so it steamed at high speed through an anti-ship minefield and jagged coral reefs. The situation became so desperate that the ground commander requested friendly artillery to fire on his position. Throughout the remainder of the night, Poling and Personnett strafed and rocketed muzzle flashes, directed Navy and ARVN artillery, and marked targets for the Navy A-7s that arrived on schedule at 6:30 a.m. The FACs' OV-10 was under heavy AA fire on each pass, with one of many hits passing through the canopy, showering both pilots with splinters. Due to Hanson's timely arrival, Captain Joseph Personnett (seated behind Captain Richard L. Poling), in their OV-10 was able to effectively direct Hanson's 5-inch artillery rounds onto enemy troops, thus saving the lives of 21 of 120 ARVN soldiers. Staff Sgt. Carroll Jackson, the only other American at the headquarters, was killed in the fighting. The ground commander, Maj. William P. Collier (awarded the Silver Star for his actions), later counted 265 enemy bodies on the perimeter fences and credited Poling and Personnett with saving his remaining troops from annihilation, both men were awarded the Air Force Cross. Hanson for its part, and for other operations in 1972, was awarded the Meritorious Unit Commendation.

On the evening of 17 September, Hanson was forced to move from Mộ Đức to Da Nang to transfer a crew member with symptoms of appendicitis. While transferring the ill crew member to the Da Nang facility, Hanson was hailed by a flashing light, "S-O-S" indicating assistance needed. This happened at total nightfall and when Hanson was moving into an anchorage within the harbor. Hanson lowered its motor whale boat and proceeded in sending the sick crew member ashore in the company of 6-man team. After the MEDEVAC transfer, the motor whale boat headed toward the troubled ship but no one seemed to be on board. No mines as reported were spotted so the harbor authorities were then notified. Just then a small boat approached the ship with the Master of the troubled vessel aboard and said his crew jumped overboard on seeing what they thought was a mine. A demolition team later arrived and took care of the situation. The motor whale boat and its 6-man team returned to Hanson.

On 1 October, supported the 11th Ranger group, probably around the Mộ Đức area. From 2 to 3 October Hanson, relieved of gun line duties, participated in WBLC north of DMZ by participating in nine surface raider strikes against transshipment points, storage areas, and other military targets along the coast of North Vietnam.

From 14 through 20 October, Hanson went to Hong Kong around the time of the Chung Yeung (or ascending heights) festival where she stayed for about 6 days. Family members were flown over by charter flight and all celebrated the end of Hanson's final WESTPAC deployment.

==== The final journey home ====
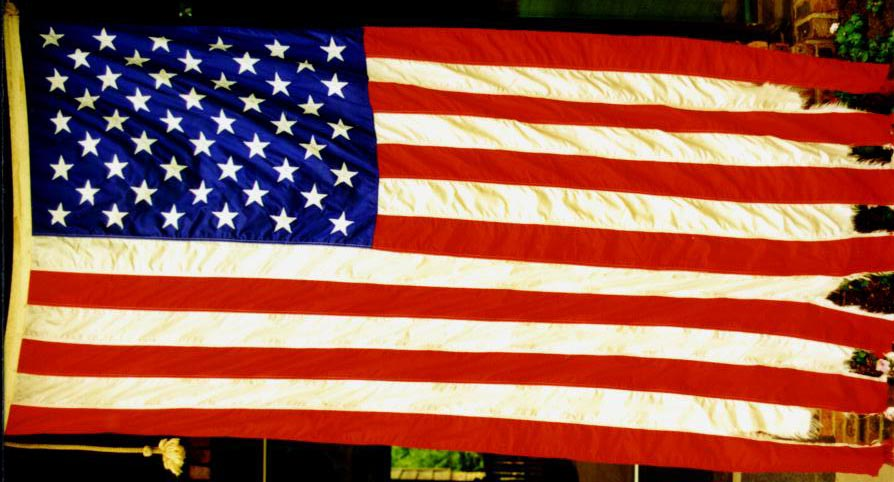
Hanson's underway ensign that flew from the forward mast the entire time in the Gulf, 1972

Hanson then put into Subic Bay for a short stay to ready for the long trip home. On 23 October she departed, along with Hull and Dennis J. Buckley steaming through the Philippine Islands and the San Bernardino Strait. Upon hitting open water and heading east, the weather began to turn rough. In Guam, on 26 October, it was decided to continue to Pearl Harbor, bypassing the intended stopover at Midway Island, due to the typhoon in the vicinity. Storm evasion was effective and despite heavy seas, all ships reached Pearl Harbor, on 3 November, without incident. The next morning Dennis J. Buckley and Hanson set out for San Diego, and on 10 November 1972, Hanson, in the company of Dennis J. Buckley and Hull, entered San Diego harbor where she moored for her post-deployment stand-down, an INSURV inspection and decommissioning preparation.

==== Events during 1972 Vietnam tour ====
Hanson participated in a myriad of typical destroyer operations: Naval Gunfire Support, carrier escort, search and rescue, surface raider strikes and WBLC (Water Borne Logistics Craft Interdiction).

Hanson's participation north of the DMZ, 4 separate occasions, 42 strikes.

- Operation Linebacker (orig. Freedom Train)- starting May 4, 1972
  - Hanson subjected to over 300 rounds of hostile fire
  - Hanson sustained minor damage on two separate occasions from N. Vietnam batteries
- Operation Custom Tailor – May 10, 1972
- Water Borne Logistics Craft Interdiction. September 2 thru 8, October 2 thru 3.

Hanson's participation south of the DMZ, 5 assignments on the gun line.

- Operation Song Thanh (5-72)- May 13, 1972
- Operation Song Thanh (6-72)- May 24, 1972
- Operation Lam Son 72 I – June 29, to July 11, 1972
- Operation Lam Son 72 II – July 11, to July 22, 1972
- Battle for Mộ Đức – September 16 – 18, 1972

Following the Christmas holidays, Hanson went through tender and DATC availability and came to her final resting place at Quaywall South Six, US Naval Station, San Diego.

==== Decommissioning ====
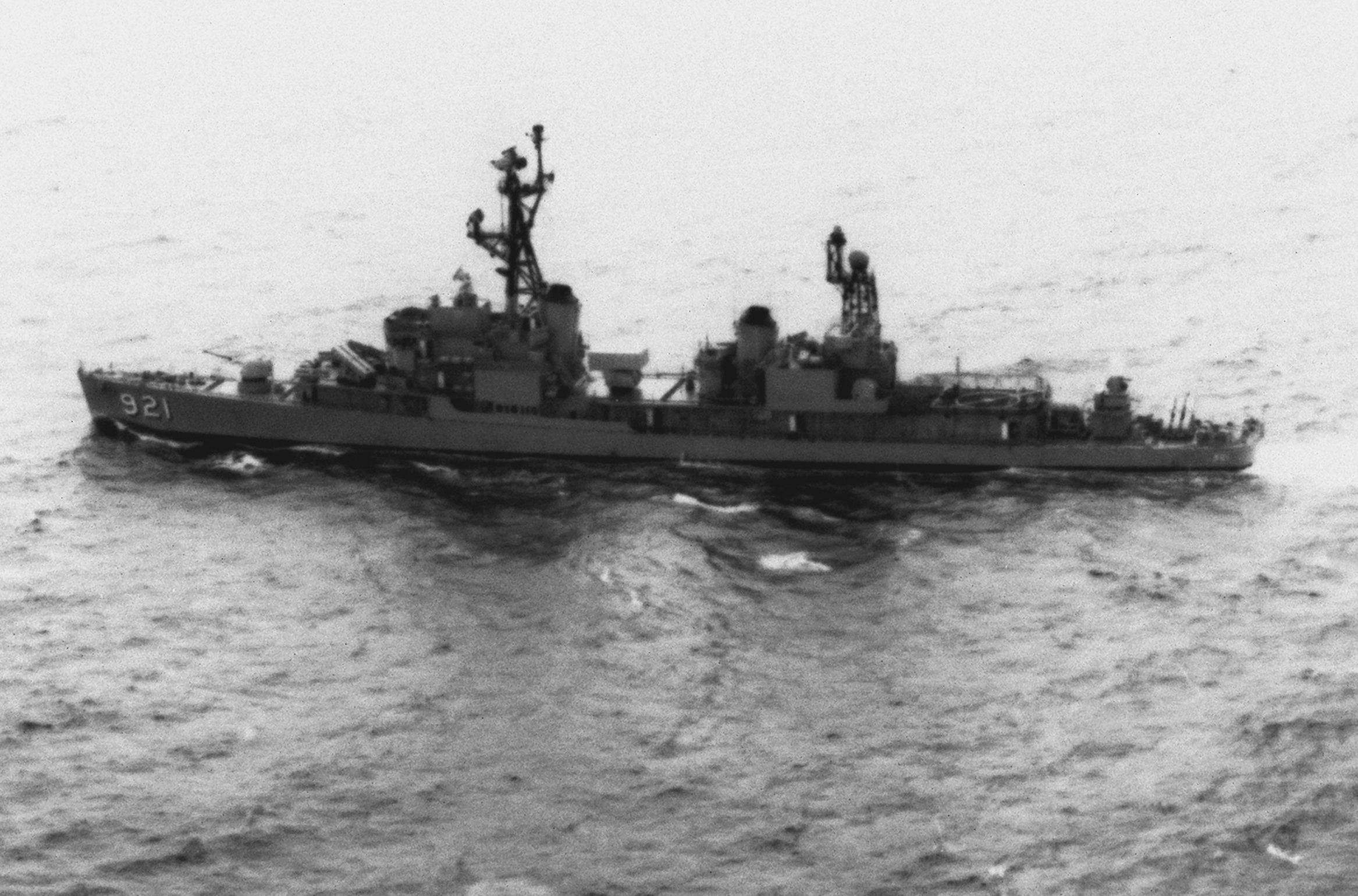
Liao Yang underway in 1993

Hanson was decommissioned and stricken from the Naval Vessel Register on 31 March 1973.

The ship was transferred to the Republic of China on 18 April 1973.

=== Service in the Republic of China Navy ===
She served in the Republic of China Navy as Liao Yang (DDG-921). After 31 years of service in the Republic of China Navy, she was decommissioned on 1 June 2004, at Kaohsiung.

In July 2006, Liao Yang was sunk as a target in the South China Sea during Han Kuang, a Taiwanese national armed forces joint exercise.

== Armament history ==
Hanson's armament evolution throughout its history:

| Weapon | 1945 | 1954 | After 1964 |
|---|---|---|---|
| 5"/38 Twin | 6 | 6 | 4 |
| 3"/50 Twin | | 4 | |
| 3"/50 Single | | 2 | |
| 40mm Quad. | 12 | | |
| 40mm Twin | 4 | | |
| 20mm Twin | 18 | | |
| Mk 14/15 Torpedo tubes 21 inches (530 mm) Quintuple | 5 | 5 | |
| Hedgehog MK11 | | 2 | |
| Depth Charge Tracks | 2 | 1 | |
| Depth Charge Projectors | 6 | 6 | |
| MK 32 Tubes | | | 6 |
| MK 16 ASROC | | | 8 |
| DASH | | | 1 |

== Awards ==
Hanson was in commission for more than 27 years. In 1972, Hanson displayed two plexiglas (about 2' × 5') placards from the bridge wings, forward, on port and starboard sides showing at least 12 awards. At various times in her career, Hanson also displayed Battle Effectiveness Award insignia for Antisubmarine warfare excellence, Operational excellence and Gunnery excellence.

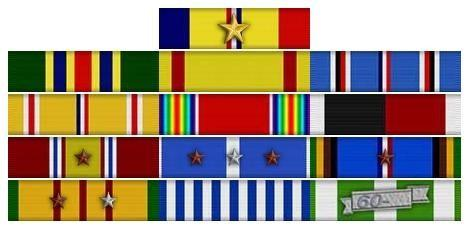
Approximation of Hanson's final ribbon placard /w stars as listed on usshanson832.org. Two mounted, one on each bridge wing, forward. According to former crew recollection, the Meritorious Unit Commendation was never painted on the placard(s) as Hanson was scheduled for decommissioning after 1972 cruise.

2 × Combat Action Ribbon for Vietnam on 25 October 1966 and Vietnam from 4 May 1972 to 15 May 1972
Meritorious Unit Commendation: Mộ Đức, Vietnam for 21 April 1972 to 29 October 1972.
National Defense Service Medal: Two conflicts
Vietnam Service Medal: 7 times served. (20 time periods from 6 deployments from 1965 to 1972)
Vietnam Campaign Medal: Vietnam
Armed Forces Expeditionary Medal: for 10 time periods including Taiwan Straits 1958, Quemoy & Matsu Islands 1960, Vietnam 1961 and 1965 and Korea 1968, 1969 and 1971
China Service Medal: Post WWII, Taiwan, Formosa Patrol
Asiatic Pacific Campaign Medal: Post World War II, 1946
Korean Service Medal: 8 times served
Gallantry Cross (Vietnam) with Palm for 24 October 1966 to 10 November 1966
United Nations Service Medal: Korea
Navy Occupation Service Medal: Japan
American Campaign Medal: World War II
World War II Victory Medal: United States
8 battle, campaign, or service stars. (Korea)
7 battle, campaign, or service stars. (Vietnam)

== Ship's record of deployments ==
Hanson made at least 21 cruises; 3 Mediterranean and 18 or more Western Pacific.

| Cruise # | Port Departed | Port Returned | Deploy Date | Cruise Vicinity | Return Date |
|---|---|---|---|---|---|
| | Boston, Ma | Boston, Ma | May, 1945 | Shakedown; Gitmo, Cuba | May, 1945 |
| | Boston, MA | NS Norfolk, VA | Jul, 1945 | Shakedown; after DDR convert. Culebra Isle | Aug, 1945 |
| 1 first | NS Norfolk, Va | NS Norfolk, Va. | Nov 7, 1945 | Westpac; Post WWII, Jpn. China | Feb 6, 1947 |
| 2 | Newport, RI | NS Newport, RI | Jan, 1948 | Mediterranean, 6th Fleet | Jun, 1948 |
| 3 | NS Newport, RI | NS Newport, RI | Apr, 1949 | Mediterranean, 6th Fleet, Greece, Lebanon | Oct, 1949 |
| 4 | NS Newport, RI | NS Newport, RI | Jan 6, 1950 | Mediterranean, 6th Fleet | Jun 1, 1950 |
| 5 | NS Newport, RI | San Diego | Jul 12, 1950 | Westpac; Inchon, Hŭngnam & Wonsan, Korea | Apr, 1951 |
| 6 | San Diego | San Diego | Aug, 1951 | Westpac; Korea, Formosa, Plane guard | May, 1952 |
| 7 | San Diego | San Diego | Dec, 1952 | Westpac; Korea | Jul 20, 1953 |
| 8 | San Diego | San Diego | Jul 9, 1956 | Westpac, Japan, Formosa | Dec 19, 1956 |
| 9 | San Diego | San Diego | Jul 8, 1957 | Westpac, So. Pac., Jpn. | Dec 22, 1957 |
| 10 | San Diego | San Diego | ?, 1958 | Westpac, Formosa Straits | Oct-Nov, 1958 |
| 11 | San Diego | San Diego | | Westpac | |
| 12 | San Diego | San Diego | ?, 1960 | Westpac: Quemoy, Matsu | ?, 1960 |
| 13 | San Diego | San Diego | | Westpac | |
| 14 | San Diego | San Diego | ?, 1962 | Westpac, So. Pac., Australia | ?, 1962 |
| 15 | San Diego | San Diego | Apr, 1963 | Westpac, So. Pac., Aus, Japan | Nov 23, 1963 |
| | San Diego | San Francisco Shipyard | Apr 1, 1964 | FRAM I conversion period | Dec 6, 1964 |
| 16 | San Diego | San Diego | May, 1965 | Westpac, Vietnam | Nov, 1965 |
| 17 | San Diego | San Diego | Aug 17, 1966 | Westpac, Vietnam | Feb 11, 1967 |
| 18 | San Diego | San Diego | Mar 12, 1968 | Westpac, Jpn Sea, Korea, So. China Sea | Sep 26, 1968 |
| 19 | San Diego | San Diego | Aug 2, 1969 | Westpac, Vietnam, Korea | Feb 12, 1970 |
| 20 | San Diego | San Diego | Feb 5, 1971 | Westpac, Vietnam, Jpn, Korea, | Aug 4, 1971 |
| 21 Last | San Diego | San Diego | Apr 10, 1972 | Westpac, Vietnam | Nov 10, 1972 |
