= Richard Andersen =

Richard Andersen may refer to:

- Richard A. Andersen (chemist) (1942–2019), American Professor of Chemistry at UC Berkeley
- Richard A. Andersen (neuroscientist) (born 1950), American Professor of Neuroscience at Caltech

== See also ==
- Richard Anderson (disambiguation)
