= Richard White =

Richard White may refer to:

== Business ==
- Richard White (businessman) (born 1955), Australian tech billionaire, co-founder of WiseTech Global

== Politicians ==
- Richard White (fl.1397), Member of Parliament for Norwich in 1397
- Richard White (fl. 1402), Member of Parliament for Great Grimsby in 1402
- Richard White (16th century MP) (1509–1558), Member of Parliament for City of York
- Richard White (Kentucky politician) (born 1952), Kentucky legislator
- Richard White (Wisconsin politician) (1827–1895), Wisconsin legislator
- Richard Crawford White (1923–1998), U.S. Representative from Texas (1965–1983)
- Richard Smeaton White (1865–1936), Canadian newspaper publisher and political figure

== Judges ==
- Richard Conway White (born 1952), judge of the Supreme Court of South Australia
- Richard Weeks White (born 1954), judge of the Supreme Court of New South Wales
- Richard White (Irish judge) (died 1367), Lord Chief Justice of Ireland

== Sports ==
- Richard White (athlete), British Paralympic medalist
- Richard White (cricketer) (1934–2006), cricketer
- Richard White (racing driver) (born 1939), racing driver
- Richard White (rugby union) (1925–2012), All Black from 1949 and mayor of Gisborne

== Academics ==
- Richard White (mathematician) (1590–1682), or Ricardo Albio, English mathematician and physicist
- Richard Grant White (1822–1885), American Shakespearean scholar
- Richard White of Basingstoke (1539–1611), English jurist and historian, expatriate and Catholic priest
- Richard M. White (1930–2020), electrical engineer and professor
- Richard White (historian) (born 1947), historian of the American West

== Artists ==
- Richard White (actor) (born 1953), voice of Gaston in Disney's Beauty and the Beast
- Richard Von White (born 1951), abstract expressionist artist

== Others ==
- Richard A. White, American public transit official
- Richard White, 1st Earl of Bantry (1767–1851), Anglo-Irish soldier and peer
- Richard White, 2nd Earl of Bantry (1800–1868), Irish representative peer
- Richard White, founder of the Foster/White Gallery in Seattle
- Richard Gwyn or Richard White (c. 1537–1584), Welsh Roman Catholic martyr, poet and saint
- Richard Dean White, perpetrator of the Vermilion County, Illinois bombings

== See also ==
- Rick White (disambiguation)
- Dick White (1906–1993), head of the British Secret Intelligence Service
- Dick White (footballer) (1931–2002), Liverpool F.C. player
- Richard Brooman-White (1912–1964), British journalist, intelligence agent, and politician
