= Operation Custom Tailor =

Part of the Vietnam War (1972)

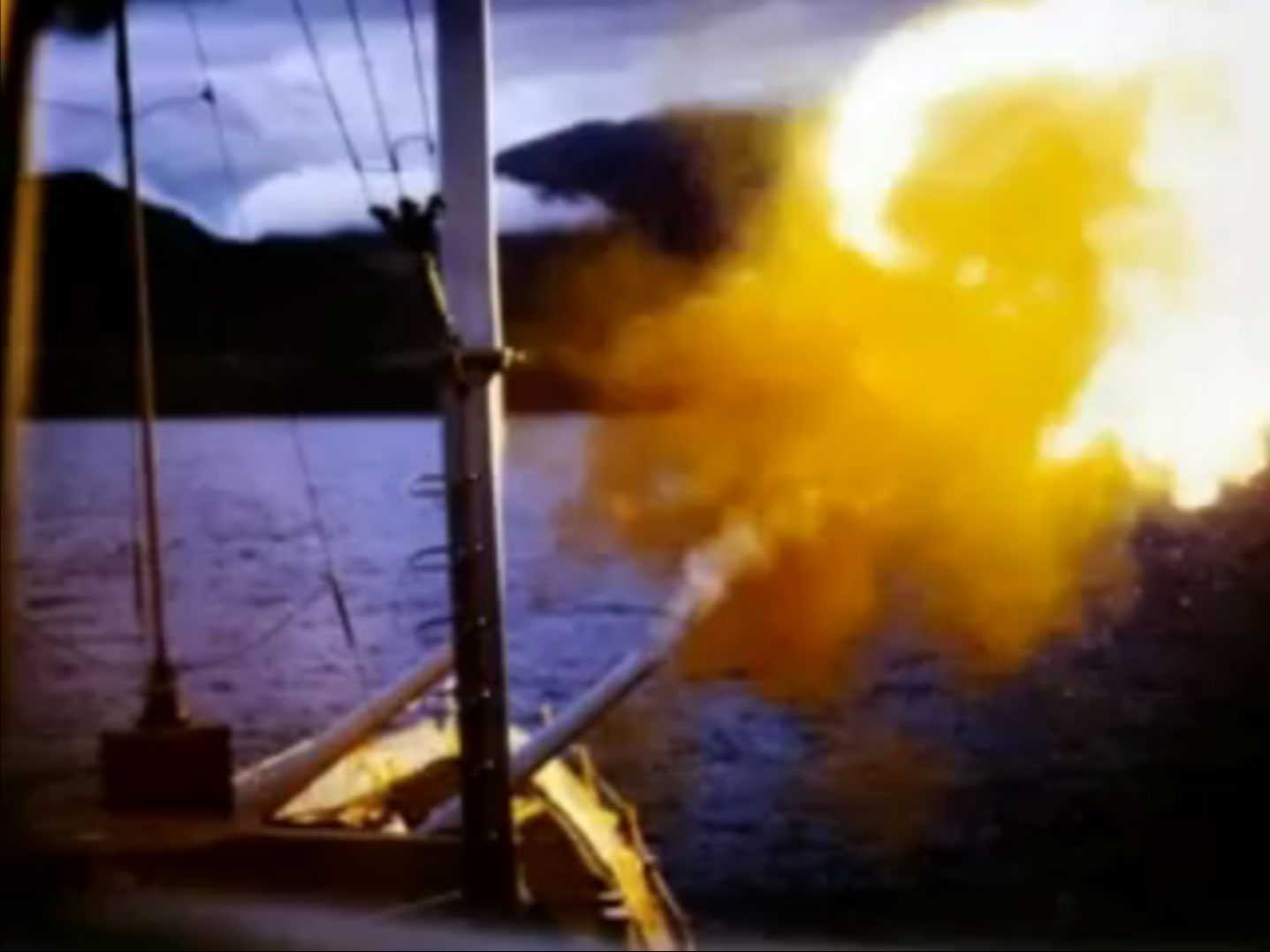
- USS Hanson firing on the North Vietnamese coast, 1972
- Objective: Mine the port of Haiphong, North Vietnam.
- Date: 10 May 1972; 54 years ago
- Executed by: United States
- Outcome: United States victory, objectives completed.

Operation Custom Tailor was an American cruiser and destroyer strike force that conducted a raid on Haiphong, North Vietnam, on 10 May 1972. It was a history-making strike that involved the most formidable cruiser/destroyer fleet in the Western Pacific since World War II. During the strike, military targets within four miles of Haiphong were hit and enemy opposition was heavy.

== Operation ==
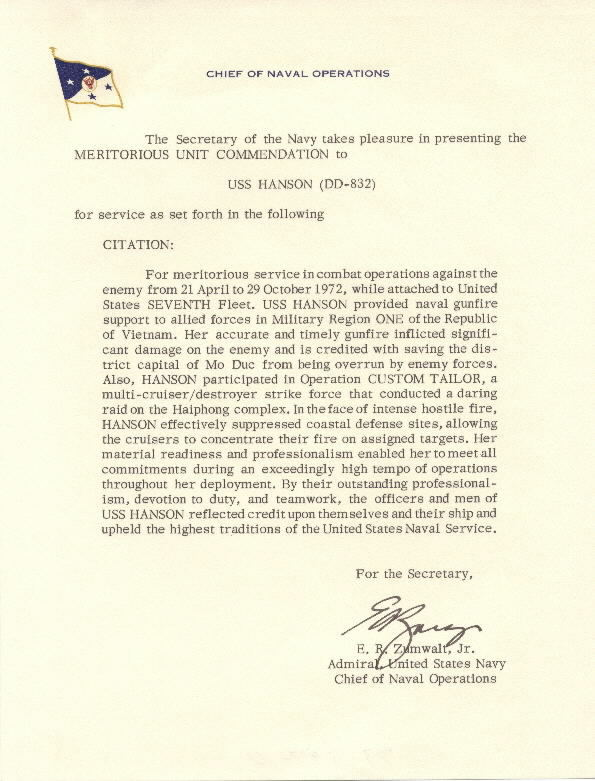
The Meritorious Unit Commendation was awarded to the crew of USS Hanson.

The ships participating were USS Hanson, USS Buchanan, USS Newport News, USS Providence and USS Oklahoma City.

During the raid, USS Hanson entered Haiphong Harbor to suppress North Vietnamese shore batteries while enabling other United States Navy forces to mine the Haiphong Harbor entrance. This made USS Hanson the last American warship to enter Haiphong Harbor during the Vietnam War and the last one out.
