= Rick Fraser =

Rick Fraser may refer to:

- Rick Fraser (chuckwagon racer) (born 1959), Canadian chuckwagon racer
- Rick Fraser (ice hockey) (born 1954), Canadian ice hockey player
- Rick Fraser (politician) (born 1971/72), Canadian politician
