= Richard B. Anderson =

United States Marine Corps Medal of Honor recipient (1921–1944)

Richard Beatty Anderson
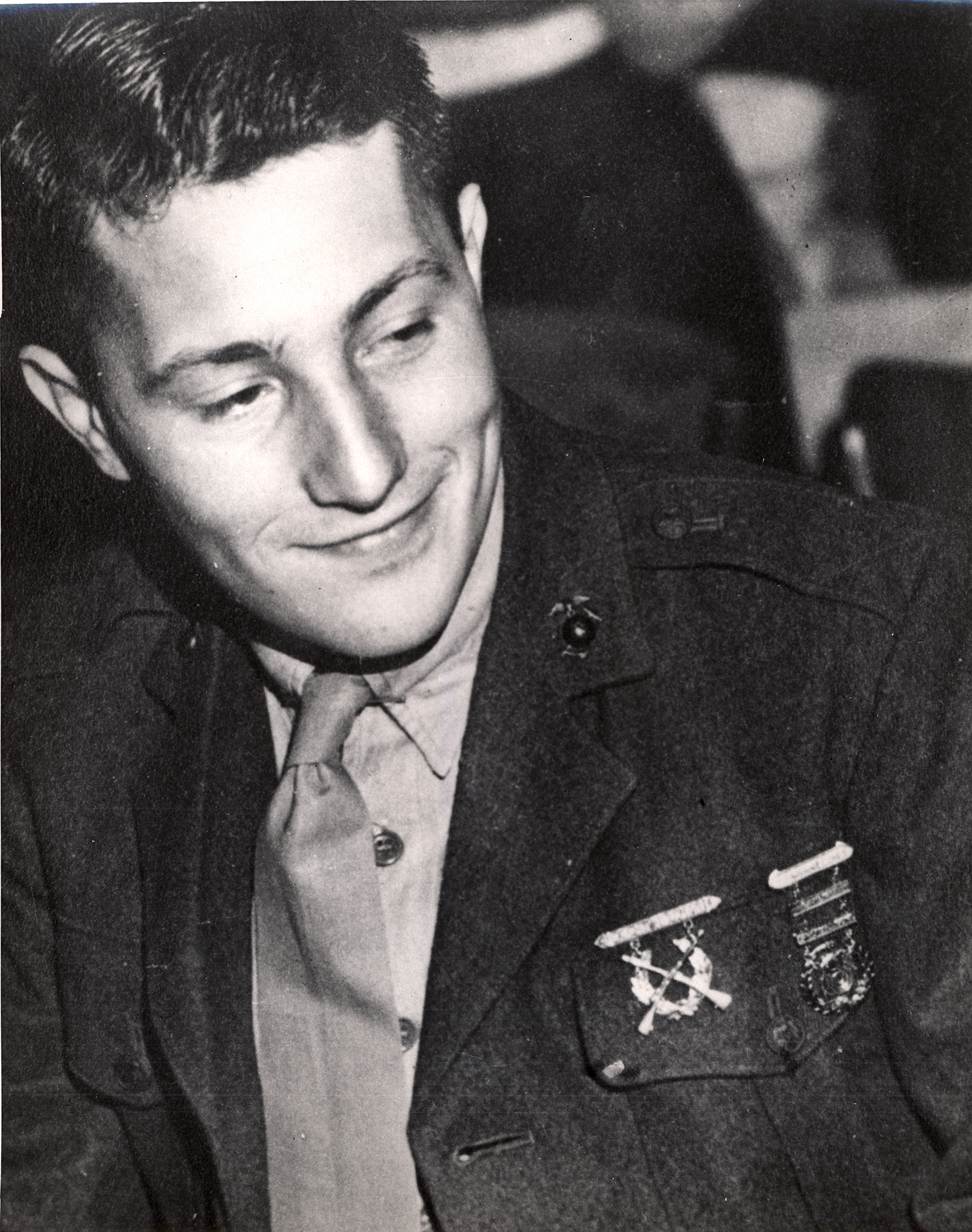
- Born: June 26, 1921; Tacoma, Washington, US
- Died: February 1, 1944 (aged 22); Roi Island, Kwajalein Atoll, Marshall Islands
- Burial place: New Tacoma Cemetery, University Place, Washington
- Military career
- Allegiance: United States
- Branch: United States Marine Corps
- Service years: 1942–1944
- Rank: Private First Class
- Unit: 2nd Battalion, 23rd Marines
- Conflicts: World War II: Battle of Kwajalein (DOW)
- Awards: Medal of Honor; Purple Heart

Richard Beatty Anderson (June 26, 1921 – February 1, 1944) was a United States Marine who sacrificed his life during World War II and received the Medal of Honor posthumously for his heroism.

== Biography ==
Anderson was born in Tacoma, Washington, on June 26, 1921, and was raised in Agnew, Washington. He attended Macleay School in Agnew before graduating from Sequim High School in the nearby city of Sequim.

Anderson entered the Marine Corps on July 6, 1942, in Oakland, California, receiving his recruit training at Marine Corps Recruit Depot San Diego, California. Private Anderson then joined the Marine Barracks, Naval Receiving Station in San Diego in October 1942. Promoted to private first class on April 12, 1943, he was ordered to the Infantry Battalion, Training Center, Camp Elliott, San Diego, shortly afterwards.

Anderson next joined his last unit, Company E, 2nd Battalion, 23rd Marines, and departed from the United States with them in January 1944. The following month, Anderson participated in the invasion of Roi Island, the first pre-war Japanese territory to fall to US Forces.

PFC Anderson, a member of the invasion force, was hunting enemy snipers. He hurled himself on a live grenade in a shell hole to save the lives of three comrades, though Anderson knew death for himself was almost certain. Anderson was evacuated to a ship, where he died of his wounds on February 1, 1944. Anderson is buried at Lot #5 Block C Section 1 #182 at the New Tacoma Cemetery, 9212 Chambers Creek Road West, Tacoma, Washington. He posthumously received the Medal of Honor — the nation's highest military decoration — and the Purple Heart.

== Awards and honors ==
=== Decorations ===

	Medal of Honor	
Purple Heart	Asiatic-Pacific Campaign Medal	World War II Victory Medal

=== Medal of Honor citation ===
The President of the United States takes pride in presenting the MEDAL OF HONOR posthumously to

PRIVATE FIRST CLASS RICHARD B. ANDERSON
UNITED STATES MARINE CORPS

for service as set forth in the following CITATION:

For conspicuous gallantry and intrepidity at the risk of his life above and beyond the call of duty while serving with the Fourth Marine Division during action against enemy Japanese forces on Roi Island, Kwajalein Atoll, Marshall Islands, February 1, 1944. Entering a shell crater occupied by three other Marines, Private First Class Anderson was preparing to throw a grenade at an enemy position when it slipped from his hands and rolled toward the men at the bottom of the hole. With insufficient time to retrieve the armed weapon and throw it, Private First Class Anderson fearlessly chose to sacrifice himself and save his companions by hurling his body upon the grenade and taking the full impact of the explosion. His personal valor and exceptional spirit of loyalty in the face of almost certain death were in keeping with the highest traditions of the United States Naval Service. He gallantly gave his life for his country.

/S/ FRANKLIN D. ROOSEVELT

=== Posthumous honors ===
Richard B. Anderson Federal Building, Port Angeles, Washington

In 1945, the United States Navy destroyer USS Richard B. Anderson (DD-786) was named in honor of Medal of Honor recipient Anderson. The Port Angeles Federal Building was renamed the Richard B. Anderson Federal Building in his honor on September 2, 2008. During the renaming ceremony, a letter written by Harry Pearce was read; Pearce was one of the three men that Anderson had saved.

== See also ==
- List of Medal of Honor recipients for World War II
