= Rick James (disambiguation) =

Rick James (1948–2004) was an American singer-songwriter, multi-instrumentalist and record producer.

Rick James may also refer to:

- Rick James (actor) (1939–2018), also activist/politician from Antigua
- Rick James (baseball) (born 1947), American baseball player
- "Rick James", a 2014 song by Keyshia Cole from Point of No Return
- "Rick James", a 2013 song by Nelly from M.O.
- Richard D. James (a.k.a. Aphex Twin), an electronic/IDM artist
- Rick James (politician), member of the Kansas House of Representatives

== See also ==
- "Rick James Sketch", a comedy sketch
