= Rick Anderson =

Rick Anderson may refer to:

== Musicians ==
- Rick Anderson, bass player for the rock band The Tubes
- Rick Anderson, singer for the metal bands Warlord, Lordian Winds, and Martiria

== Others ==
- Rick Anderson (political strategist), Canadian political strategist and businessman
- Rick Anderson (baseball, born 1953) (1953–1989), New York Yankees and Seattle Mariners
- Rick Anderson (baseball, born 1956) (born 1956), pitching coach for the Minnesota Twins; played for New York Mets and Kansas City Royals

== See also ==
- Ricky Anderson, boxer
- Richard Anderson (disambiguation)
