= Rick White =

Rick White may refer to:

- Rick White (baseball) (born 1968), former Major League Baseball pitcher
- Rick White (musician) (born 1970), Canadian rock musician and record producer
- Rick White (politician) (born 1953), American politician
- Rick White (rock climber) (1946–2004), Australian rock climber

== See also ==
- Richard White (disambiguation)
