= USS Richard B. Anderson =

Gearing-class destroyer

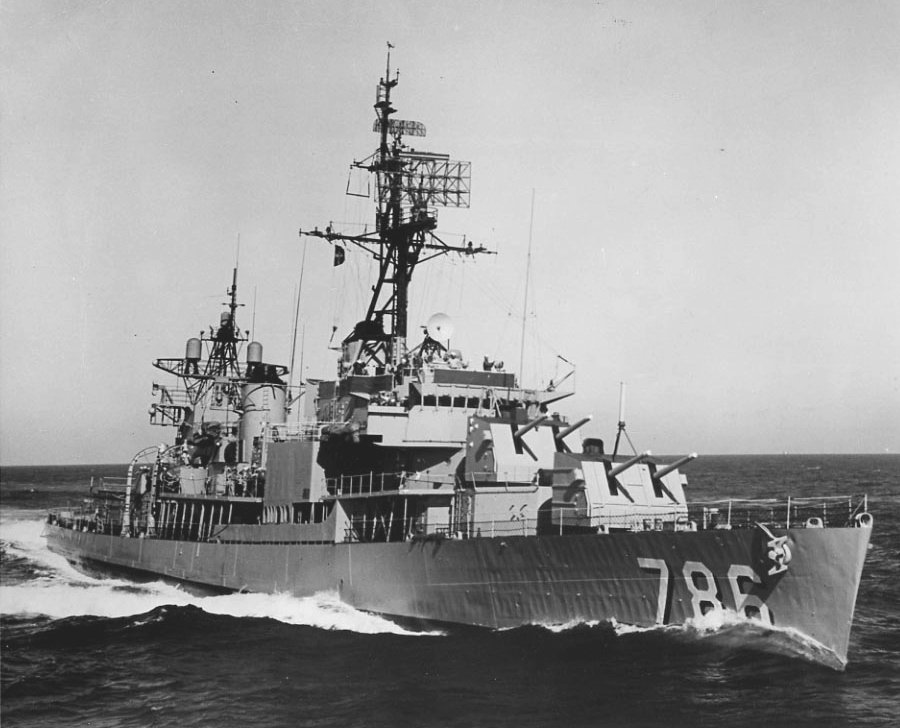
- USS Richard B. Anderson underway in August 1964

History

United States
- Name: Richard B. Anderson
- Namesake: Richard B. Anderson
- Builder: Todd Shipyards
- Laid down: 1 December 1944
- Launched: 7 July 1945
- Sponsored by: Mrs. Oscar A. Anderson
- Commissioned: 26 October 1945
- Modernized: May 1961 (FRAM IA)
- Decommissioned: 20 December 1975
- Stricken: 30 January 1976
- Identification: Callsign: NHKU; Hull number: DD-786
- Motto: In Omnia Paratus; (Ready For Anything)
- Nickname(s): Commodore; Freedom Train
- Honors and awards: See Awards
- Fate: Transferred to Republic of China, 1 June 1977

History

Taiwan
- Name: Kai Yang; (開陽)
- Namesake: Kai Yang
- Acquired: 1 June 1977
- Commissioned: 31 August 1977
- Reclassified: DDG-924, 1980s
- Identification: Hull number: DD-924
- Decommissioned: 16 November 1999
- Fate: Sunk as artificial reef

General characteristics
- Class & type: Gearing-class destroyer
- Displacement: 3,460 long tons (3,516 t) full
- Length: 390 ft 6 in (119.02 m)
- Beam: 40 ft 10 in (12.45 m)
- Draft: 14 ft 4 in (4.37 m)
- Propulsion: Geared turbines, 2 shafts, 60,000 shp (45 MW)
- Speed: 35 knots (65 km/h; 40 mph)
- Range: 4,500 nmi (8,300 km) at 20 kn (37 km/h; 23 mph)
- Complement: 336
- Armament: 6 × 5"/38 caliber guns; 12 × 40 mm AA guns; 11 × 20 mm AA guns; 10 × 21 inch (533 mm) torpedo tubes; 6 × depth charge projectors; 2 × depth charge tracks

USS Richard B. Anderson (DD-786) was a Gearing-class destroyer of the United States Navy, named for USMC Private First Class Richard B. Anderson (1921–1944), who was posthumously awarded the Medal of Honor for heroism during the Battle of Kwajalein.

== Construction and career ==
Richard B. Anderson was laid down on 1 December 1944 by Todd Pacific Shipyards, Inc., Seattle, Washington; launched on 7 July 1945; sponsored by Mrs. Oscar A. Anderson, mother of PFC Anderson; and commissioned on 26 October 1945. Among the Anderson's plank owners was Motor Machinists Mate Robert L. Anderson (Richard's brother). Ship was featured in the movie The Caine Mutiny, shown at the end of the movie.

=== Service in the United States Navy ===
==== World War II ====
After shakedown, Richard B. Anderson, homeported at San Diego, California, served as plane guard for Essex-class carriers operating off southern California. Immobilized by a shortage of personnel in the fall of 1946, she was fully active by January 1947 and in February she participated in fleet exercises off Hawaii. Search and rescue (SAR) operations, local exercises off California and an overhaul took up the remainder of 1947 and early 1948.

On 9 March 1948, she sailed for Pearl Harbor; conducted two weeks of anti-submarine warfare (ASW) exercises there; then continued across the Pacific for duty with the 7th Fleet. In April, she arrived at Tsingtao, China, then shifted to Buckner Bay, Okinawa, for further exercises. In mid-May she was back in Chinese waters. Duty at Tsingtao and Shanghai was followed by visits to Hong Kong and Manila and during late August and early September a return to China. On 12 November she sailed for California, arriving on the 26th. In March 1949, the destroyer took part in Aerobee guided missile tests at the magnetic equator. Five months later, she again sailed west for duty with the 7th Fleet. Operating primarily in the Philippines during that tour, she visited Saigon, Indochina, 16–23 March 1950, and witnessed operations of Viet Minh forces against French authorities.

==== Korean War ====
Richard B. Anderson returned to the United States in June. Hostilities broke out in Korea soon thereafter and on 19 February 1951 she sailed west again with Destroyer Division 12 (DesDiv 12). On 12 March, she arrived at Sasebo, Japan, and two days later joined Task Force 77 (TF 77) off the east coast of the embattled peninsula. Into April she served as escort and plane guard for the aircraft carriers launching strikes against North Korean and Chinese forces, power sources and supply, industrial, and transport centers. At Yokosuka in mid-April, she was back off Korea for an amphibious feint against the mining and transport center of Tanchon at the end of the month. In May, she conducted ASW exercises off Japan and Okinawa, and in June, she operated as a unit of the Taiwan Strait Patrol. During July she conducted hunter-killer (HUK) exercises; then, in August, she resumed operations with TF 77 and spent the last weeks of her deployment off Korea.

The destroyer arrived at San Diego on 30 September. Seven months later she headed back across the Pacific, again stopping in Hawaii. On 12 June 1952 she rejoined TF 77 and, with an interruption for a railway interdiction mission on the 25th, remained with the carriers into July. On 9 July she returned to Japan; conducted ASW exercises south of there until the 31st; then steamed for Keelung and another tour of patrol duty in the Taiwan Strait. On 21 August she was back off Korea, as a unit of TF 95, the U.N. Blockade and Escort Force. On the 23rd she shifted from Wonsan to Songjin and on the 27th she rejoined TF 77. Detached on the 30th, she participated in support operations along the bombline until the 2nd, then, on the 3rd, headed back to Yokosuka. At mid-month she moved to Hakodate, Hokkaido, for HUK operations and at the end of the month she rejoined TF 77. With two interruptions for harassment and interdiction missions, she remained with TF 77 until the 18th, then joined TF 70 for operations south of Japan. In November, she resumed operations with the carriers of TF 77.

On 24 November 1952, Richard B. Anderson departed Korea for Yokosuka. SAR duty followed and on 6 December she headed for Guam and the United States. In January 1953, Anderson was selected for a cameo appearance in The Caine Mutiny: at the end of the movie, she steams out of San Francisco as now-LTJG Willie Keith's new ship, skippered by now-CDR DeVrees, his original commanding officer aboard the Caine.

After Korea, Richard B. Anderson alternated between duty with the 7th Fleet in the western Pacific (WestPac) and training operations and regular overhauls on the west coast. In July 1960, she put into the Puget Sound Naval Shipyard for a Fleet Rehabilitation and Modernization (FRAM I) overhaul and emerged in May 1961 with ASROC, DASH, modernized communications equipment, and improved berthing and messing areas. Trials, refresher training and fleet exercise Operation "Sea Shell" occupied the remainder of 1961.

In May 1962, the "new" destroyer participated in Operation Swordfish, part of Operation Dominic, the series of nuclear tests carried out at Christmas Island and elsewhere. "Swordfish" was the open-ocean, live-firing test of a Nuclear Anti-Submarine Rocket (ASROC) weapon. On her return, she shifted from Destroyer Division 12 (DesDiv 12) to DesDiv 51. Operations with her new squadron, Destroyer Squadron 5 (DesRon 5), a good will visit to Portland, Oregon, and local exercises followed. In November she resumed her annual WestPac deployment schedule.

Through the 1950s and during her 1962–63 deployment, Richard B. Anderson participated in ASW/HUK exercises, SEATO operations, and joint United States-Japanese exercises and served on Taiwan patrol duty. On 5 August 1964, however, she headed west for a combat zone, Vietnam. On the 28th she arrived at Subic Bay, Philippine Islands, and in early September took up station in Tonkin Gulf in support of the carriers of TF 77. At the end of the month she returned to Subic Bay, then steamed to Hong Kong where she served as station ship during October. In mid-November she returned to Vietnam and for almost 2 months she screened ready amphibious groups off southern South Vietnam and carrier striking groups in Tonkin Gulf; conducted surveys of hostile islands; and served on picket station. In mid-January, she steamed into Yokosuka Harbor and on the 19th she sailed for home.

==== Vietnam War ====
Arriving at San Diego on 1 February 1965, Richard B. Anderson, resumed duties with the 1st Fleet. For the rest of 1965, she remained in the eastern Pacific — conducting training exercises, including a midshipman cruise; serving as electronics school ship; and participating in division and fleet exercises. On 7 January 1966, she headed west again. In early February she joined TG 77.5 off the coast of South Vietnam. Detached briefly for surveillance duty, she remained with TG 77.5 until the 11th, then took up picket station duty south of Hainan Island. On the 17th she headed for Japan and on 3 March she returned to the Philippines. At mid-month she was back off Vietnam for gunfire support duty near Huế. In early April she briefly visited Hong Kong, then resumed operations in Tonkin Gulf. At the end of the month she underwent availability at Kaohsiung and on her return to Vietnam alternated between plane guard duty with USS Intrepid and shore bombardment missions in the Mekong Delta. On 15 June she steamed north for a last visit to Japan prior to returning to the United States.

Richard B. Anderson arrived back at San Diego on 10 July. Overhaul, school ship duty, and local and fleet exercises followed. On 25 April 1967, she again sailed west. During June, July, part of August, and most of September, she performed plane guard and search and rescue (SAR) duties off the coast of Vietnam. By the end of October, she was back in San Diego.

Varied assignments — "quickstart" ship, schoolship, an overhaul, and midshipman training cruise ship — occupied the winter, spring, and summer. At the end of September 1968 she again deployed to WestPac. Two weeks of exercises off Hawaii followed her departure from California and on the 27th she arrived at Yokosuka. Three days later she steamed for Vietnam. Gunfire support duty south of the demilitarized zone (DMZ) and off Da Nang took her well into November. SEATO exercises followed, and at the end of the month she returned to the combat zone for operations with the fast carriers. In mid-December she steamed to Japan, but was back off Vietnam for further gunfire support duty in early January 1969. From Da Nang to the DMZ, she shelled Vietcong and North Vietnamese Army concentrations, and provided night harassment and interdiction fire at known enemy positions. Detached on the 20th, she participated in another SEATO exercise, visited Hong Kong, and on 6 February took up escort and plane-guard duty in the Tonkin Gulf. In March she resumed gunfire support duty north of Nha Trang. On the 21st, she proceeded to Kaohsiung for repair and maintenance work, then returned to Tonkin Gulf for plane-guard duty. In mid-April she was ordered to the Sea of Japan for brief duty with a carrier task group, newly organized to protect surveillance flights, and, at the end of the month she sailed for home.

Arriving on 11 May she underwent overhaul during the late summer and early fall, then resumed a schedule of training exercises, schoolship duty, and in March 1970, operations with USS Oriskany. She then prepared for another WestPac deployment. On 27 May she got underway but the ship was forced to turn back due to crew sabotage of one of the reduction gears. Apparently nuts, bolts and chains were dropped down the port reduction gear. Several sailors were charged with causing the damage, but the case was later dismissed. Repairs were completed at Long Beach and in August she was once again en route to WestPac and another tour with the 7th Fleet which she completed in January 1971.

Richard B. Anderson arrived at San Diego 10 February 1971 and operated out of that port until 20 October, when embarked upon an extended deployment in the Far East. She arrived in Yokosuka, Japan, her new home port, 11 November 1971. She conducted various support duties off the coast of Vietnam including duty on the gunline and plane-guard duty with aircraft carriers. During the period 11 December 1971 – 10 January 1972, she was deployed to the Indian Ocean because of the Indo-Pakistani war. In March 1972, Anderson was again engaged in gunfire support operations off the coast of Vietnam. In April 1975, she participated in "Operation Frequent Wind" in which many South Vietnamese refugees were rescued as they were fleeing the conquest of Saigon by North Vietnamese communists.

=== Service in the Republic of China Navy ===
The destroyer remained in service until decommissioned on 20 December 1975 and officially transferred to the Republic of China (Taiwan) through the Security Assistance Program on 1 June 1977. The warship served as ROCS Kai Yang (DD-924) in the Republic of China Navy.

In 1980s, she underwent the Wu-Chin II modernization program and reclassified as DDG-924.

She was retired on 16 November 1999. She was then towed out to sea to be sunk as an artificial reef.

A surviving 5"/38cal gun and an anchor from the ship are preserved in 823 Artillery Battle Memorial Park, Taichung and veterans of the ship are still maintaining her. Her mast and Hsiung-Feng I missile launcher are on display at the Taipei Naval Command.

== Awards ==
Richard B. Anderson earned four battle stars for service during the Korean War and eleven during tours off Vietnam. She was awarded the Secretary of the Navy's Meritorious Unit Commendation three times, in addition to the Humanitarian Service Medal, and her personnel earned the Combat Action Ribbon five times.
