= Ricky =

Ricky may refer to:

== Places ==
- Říčky, a municipality and village in the Czech Republic
- Říčky, a village and part of Orlické Podhůří in the Czech Republic
- Říčky v Orlických horách, a municipality and village in the Czech Republic
- Rickmansworth, a town in Hertfordshire, England, sometimes nicknamed Ricky

== Film and television ==
- Ricky (2009 film), a French fantasy film
- Ricky (2016 film), an Indian Kannada-language thriller film
- Ricky (2025 film), an American drama film

== Music ==
- Ricky (band), a UK indie band
- Ricky (album), a 1957 album by Ricky Nelson
- "Ricky" ("Weird Al" Yankovic song), 1983
- "Ricky" (Denzel Curry song), from the 2019 album Zuu
- "Ricky" (Game song), from The R.E.D. Album, 2011

== People ==
- Ricky (given name), a diminutive of Richard, Enrique, Fredrick or Patrick
- Ricky Owubokiri (born 1961), also known as Ricky, Nigerian footballer
- Ricky (footballer, born 1973), Spanish football forward
- Ricky (musician), Japanese singer

== Other uses ==
- Ricky (dog), decorated for bravery in service during the Second World War
- Ricky (Trailer Park Boys), a character in the television series Trailer Park Boys

== See also ==
- Rick (disambiguation)
- Ricky's (disambiguation)
- Rickey (disambiguation)
- Rickie
- Riki
- Rikki (name)
