= Ricki =

Ricki is a unisex given name. Notable people with the name include:

- Ricki Ariansyah (born 1997), Indonesian professional footballer
- Ricki Chaplin (born 1964), British weightlifter
- Ricki-Lee Coulter (born 1985), American singer, songwriter, television and radio presenter
- Ricki Franklin, American television producer
- Ricki Herbert (born 1961), New Zealand footballer and manager
- Ricki Hill (born 1960), Australian professional squash player
- Ricki Kgositau, trans-rights activist from Botswana
- Ricki Lake (born 1968), American television host and actress
- Ricki Lamie (born 1993), Scottish professional footballer
- Ricki Noel Lander (born 1979), American actress, model, designer, and entrepreneur
- Ricki Olsen (born 1988), Danish professional footballer
- Ricki Ortiz (born 1981), American professional fighting game player
- Ricki Osterthun (born 1964), German tennis player
- Ricki Ruiz, American politician
- Ricki Seidman (born 1955), American politician and activist
- Ricki Starr (1931–2014), American-British professional wrestler, boxer and ballet dancer
- Ricki Stern, American film director, screenwriter, and producer
- Ricki Thomas, author of crime fiction
- Ricki Wertz (1935–2021), American actress and television personality
- Ricki Wilde (born 1961), British songwriter, musician, and record producer

== See also ==
- Rickie
- Ricky
- Rickey
