= Andrew Foster =

Andrew Foster may refer to:

== Sports ==
- Andrew Foster (tennis) (born 1972), British tennis player
- Andrew Foster (footballer) (born 1985), Australian rules footballer
- Rube Foster (Andrew Foster, 1879–1930), American baseball player, manager, and executive
- Andy Foster (sports commissioner) (born 1979), California State Athletic Commission executive

== Others ==
- Andrew Foster (politician) (1870–1956), Canadian politician
- Andy Foster (born 1961), New Zealand politician and environmentalist
- Andrew Foster (educator) (1925–1987), missionary to the deaf in Africa
- Sir Andrew Foster (British public servant) (born 1944), British civil servant
- Andrew Foster (musician) (born 1980), British musician

== See also ==
- Andrew Foster-Williams, British classical singer
