= Rikken =

Rikken may refer to:

- Rikken Dōshikai, Japanese political party active in the early years of the 20th century
- Rikken Kaishintō, political party in Meiji period Japan
- Rikken Kokumintō, political party in Meiji period Japan
- Rikken Minseito, one of the main political parties in pre-war Japan
- Rikken Seiyūkai, one of the main political parties in pre-war Japan
- Rikken Teiseitō, short-lived conservative political party in Meiji period Japan
- Rikken Minshutō, a 21st-century Japanese liberal political party

== See also ==
- Rikke
- Rikki (name)
