= Kumeta =

Kumeta (written: 久米田) is a Japanese surname. Notable people with the surname include:

- Kōji Kumeta (久米田 康治, born 1967), Japanese manga artist
- Riki Kumeta (born 1983), Japanese karateka

== See also ==
- 15246 Kumeta, a main-belt asteroid
