= List of Tokumei Sentai Go-Busters characters =

Tokumei Sentai Go-Busters (特命戦隊ゴーバスターズ, Tokumei Sentai Gōbasutāzu) is a Japanese tokusatsu series that serves as the 36th installment in the Super Sentai franchise and the 24th entry in the Heisei era.

== Main characters ==
=== Go-Busters ===
The main heroes of Tokumei Sentai Go-Busters. From left to right: Beet J. Stag, Masato Jin, Gorisaki Banana, Ryuji Iwasaki, Hiromu Sakurada, Cheeda Nick, Yoko Usami, and Usada Lettuce.

The primary members of the eponymous Go-Busters composed of Hiromu, Ryuji, and Yoko each carry a Morphin Brace as their transformation device along with an Ichigan Buster handgun and a Sougan Blade dagger, which double as a reflex camera and a pair of binoculars respectively and can combine to access the former's Special Buster Mode, as their sidearms. They also each possess a unique Buster Power ability at the cost of being afflicted with a Weak Point side effect.

The secondary members composed of Masato and Jay each carry a Morphin Blaster, which doubles as a cellphone, as their transformation device along with a DriBlade sword, which doubles as a steering wheel for their Buster Machines, as their sidearm. Unlike the primary Go-Busters, Masato's Buster Suit is created from Jay's armor parts that are cast off when they transform.

The Go-Busters later acquire GB Custom Visor adapters, which allow the primary members to fuse with their Buddyroid partners and assume Powered Custom forms that grant upgraded versions of their Buster Powers, and the Lio Blaster, which doubles as a briefcase and can combine with a Sougan Blade to access the former's Final Mode.

- Hiromu Sakurada is the serious, dedicated, and level-headed yet blunt and solitary leader of the team, despite joining last, who serves as Red Buster. His Buster Power is superhuman speed, but he is alektorophobic and will freeze up if he even hears the word "chicken". While fused with his Buddyroid partner Cheeda Nick, Hiromu gains warp speed capabilities. Hiromu is portrayed by Katsuhiro Suzuki.
- Ryuji Iwasaki is the easygoing, cool-headed, and passive second oldest and most experienced member of the team who serves as Blue Buster. His Buster Power is superhuman strength, but overusing it causes him to overheat and become highly aggressive. While fused with his Buddyroid partner Gorisaki Banana, Ryuji gains the ability to analyze substances and create a digital copy of it. Ryuji is portrayed by Ryoma Baba.
- Yoko Usami is the energetic and hyperactive youngest member of the team who serves as Yellow Buster. Her Buster Power is superhuman jumping, but she is prone to extreme calorie deficiency that forces her to frequently consume sweets. While fused with her Buddyroid partner Usada Lettuce, Yoko gains the ability to manifest objects in the air using data that she can either run or jump on mid-air. Yoko is portrayed by Arisa Komiya.
- Masato Jin is an eccentric and haughty genius engineer, and the oldest member of the team who serves as the gold-colored Beet Buster. He finds minor flaws to be more interesting than perfection. Because his physical body is trapped in Hyper Space, Masato relies on Jay to project an avatar to stay present on Earth. During the events of the crossover film Kamen Rider × Super Sentai: Ultra Super Hero Taisen, the Game World version of Masato temporarily assumes the form of Kirider where he commands the Magirangers' Magi Dragon. Masato is portrayed by Hiroya Matsumoto.
- Beet J. Stag, often simply referred to as "Jay", is Masato's beetle-themed Buddyroid partner who serves as the silver-colored Stag Buster. Created in Hyper Space by Masato, Jay is sent to reality by stowing away in a Vaglass Megazord that Enter transported. Like Masato, he is an egotist who likes appearing cool and often stands in the way of others, annoying whoever he inconveniences. Despite this, he has a high sense of awareness about things around himself, allowing him to sense immediate danger. Jay is voiced by Yuichi Nakamura.

=== Buddyroids ===
The Buddyroids are sentient robots capable of understanding human behavior who behave similarly to humans. Despite initially being unable to take part in combat, they later gain the ability to transform into protective armor and fuse with their Go-Buster partners via the GB Custom Visors.

- Cheeda Nick is Hiromu's cheetah-themed Buddyroid partner who can assume Motorbike Mode for Hiromu to ride into battle.
- Gorisaki Banana is Ryuji's gorilla-themed Buddyroid partner.
- Usada Lettuce is Yoko's rabbit-themed Buddyroid partner.
- Ene-tan is a frog-themed Buddyroid who first appears in the film Tokumei Sentai Go-Busters the Movie: Protect the Tokyo Enetower!.

== Recurring characters ==
=== Energy Management Center ===
The Energy Management Center (EMC) is a fictional organization whose Special Operations Unit employs the Go-Busters in their fight to keep the fictional energy source Enetron safe from Vaglass.

=== Vaglass ===
- Messiah is a powerful yet unintelligent, ill-tempered, single-minded, and impatient entity that originated as a computer virus that infected the TRC's computers. He originally reformatted Enter's personal Megazord into Messiah Reboot, the Go-Busters use their anti-virus program to destroy him permanently.
- Enter is Messiah's primary servant and a frivolous and laid-back, yet smart and manipulative Avatar created from the data of several Transport Research Center scientists. Enter faces the Go-Busters in a final battle, during which he learns he failed to understand humans' greatest strength is their friendship and imperfections before he is permanently destroyed and his victims are restored.
- Escape is an emotional yet reserved and cautious female Avatar who was also created from the data of several Transport Research Center scientists, such as Michiko Sakurada, and loyal servant of Messiah, whom she refers to as "Papa". Having destroyed Enter, she resolves to revive Messiah as she remembers him, only to be absorbed by her creator, who deems she outlived her usefulness.

==== Buglers ====
The Buglers are Vaglass' robotic computer virus-themed foot soldiers created by Enter using a Bugler Card that are capable of piloting giant Bugzords.

==== Metaloids ====
The Metaloids are Vaglass' robotic warriors created from objects infected with a Metavirus, a fragment of Messiah's data that mimics its inorganic assimilation and transforms the object into an artificial life form. A Metaloid's primary purpose is to serve as a beacon for its corresponding Megazord, though it will teleport within a three kilometer radius of them due to a margin of error in the teleportation process. Enter creates them to fight the Go-Busters, siphon Enetron, and buy time for the Megazords to arrive while Escape creates them to cause as much human suffering as possible.

- Shovelloid: A Metaloid that Enter created from an excavator via the Kaziru Metavirus who is equipped with a bucket arm. He is sent to attack an Enetron plant, but is destroyed by Blue and Yellow Buster. Shovelloid is voiced by Takashi Nagasako.
- Burnerloid: A Metaloid that Enter created from a gas cylinder via the Moyasu Metavirus who is equipped with a flamethrower arm. He is sent to create chaos by committing arson, but is destroyed by the Go-Busters. Burnerloid is voiced by Rintarō Nishi.
- Needloid: A Metaloid that Enter created from a syringe, among other pieces of medical equipment, via the Sasu Metavirus. He is sent to infect humans with Metal Cells to turn into Vaglass' obedient slaves, but is destroyed by Red and Yellow Buster. Needloid is voiced by Kōji Tobe.
- Cutterloid: A Metaloid that Enter created from a pizza cutter via the Kiru Metavirus who is equipped with a right arm-mounted saw and several upper back-mounted saws that allow him to attack anywhere so long as he is 30 minutes away. He is sent to distract the Go-Busters while the Cutterzord steals Enetron, but is destroyed by Blue and Yellow Buster. Cutterloid is voiced by Hajime Iijima.
- Tireloid: A Metaloid that Enter created from a bicycle tire via the Hashiru Metavirus who is capable of moving at superhuman speed and controlling vehicles. He is sent to attack an Enetron convoy, but is destroyed by Blue Buster under the effects of his Weak Point. Tireloid is voiced by Takeharu Ōnishi.
- Sprayloid: A Metaloid that Enter created from a fire extinguisher and the locker it was in via the Tokasu Metavirus who is equipped with a right arm-mounted spray gun capable of spraying acidic mist. He assists Enter in infiltrating the EMC's command center and kill the Go-Busters, but is destroyed by Blue and Yellow Buster. Sprayloid is voiced by Katsuya Shiga.
- Denshaloid: A Metaloid that Enter created from an Enetron cargo train via the Atsumeru Metavirus who is capable of firing train tracks and train wheels from his chest and enhancing his arms with extra armor. He is tasked with siphoning Enetron from the city's wiring systems so Vaglass can create more Metaloids, but is destroyed by the Go-Busters before he can complete his objective. Denshaloid is voiced by Kensuke Tamura.
- Drilloid: A Metaloid that Enter created from a handheld impact drill via the Horu Metavirus who is equipped with a drill-like agitator on his right arm and four smaller drills on his left arm. He is tasked with infiltrating the EMC's Megazord development center and stealing their blueprints for a new Buster Machine, but is destroyed by Blue Buster. Drilloid is voiced by Keiichi Kuwabara.
- Danganloid: A Metaloid that Enter created from a toy pistol that belonged to a Meta-Cell-infected boy via the Utsu Metavirus who is capable of moving at superhuman speed. He is tasked with hindering Red Buster's efforts to disrupt Enter's plot to transport a Deltarium 39 crate, but is destroyed by the Go-Buster. Danganloid is voiced by Yasunori Matsumoto.
- Fanloid: A Metaloid that Enter created from an electric fan via the Fukitobasu Metavirus who is equipped with arm-mounted blades and a chest-mounted turbine capable of generating powerful gusts. He is tasked with altering Blue Buster's body temperature and aggravate his Weak Point, but is destroyed by the Go-Buster. Fanloid is voiced by Akio Suyama.
- Copyloid: A Metaloid that Enter created from a video projector via the Utsusu Metavirus who is capable of holographically disguising itself and avoid detection while disguised. He is tasked with stealing Hong Kong actress Angie Sue's rare crystal earrings so Vaglass can use them to construct a new Megazord. He succeeds in stealing one for Enter before Copyloid is destroyed by Blue and Yellow Buster. Copyloid is voiced by Wataru Takagi.
- Tubaloid: A Metaloid that Enter created from a tuba via the Hoeru Metavirus. Purposefully making him weak, Enter uses him to mark the Go-Busters with the latter's soundwaves. After Tubaloid successfully marks Red and Blue Buster before the Go-Busters destroy him, Enter infects another tuba with the Hoeru Ver. 2 Metavirus to create Tubaloid 2, granting him the ability to destroy anything his predecessor marked via his concussive sound blasts and tasking him with taking Yellow Buster hostage. Upon realizing Enter's scheme, the Go-Busters modify their equipment, rescue Yellow Buster, and destroy Tubaloid 2. Both Tubaloid and Tubaloid 2 are voiced by Junichi Suwabe.
- Soujikiloid: A Metaloid that Enter created from a vacuum cleaner via the Suikomu Metavirus who is equipped with the right arm-mounted Enetron Cleaner, which allows him to siphon Enetron from any machine and doubles as a gun. While amassing Enetron, Soujikiloid overpowers the Go-Busters, but is destroyed by Beet and Stag Buster. Soujikiloid is voiced by Hiroyuki Yoshino.
- Parabolaloid: A Metaloid that Enter created from a parabolic antenna via the Sagasu Metavirus who is capable of tracking designated targets and firing homing missiles. He is tasked with tracking Beet and Stag Buster for Enter, but is destroyed by Blue and Yellow Buster. Parabolaloid is voiced by Makoto Yasumura.
- Forkloid: A Metaloid that Enter created from a fork via the Eguru Metavirus and infused with a tank's worth of Enetron who is equipped with a fork-like trident arm. He is tasked with fighting the Go-Busters, but is destroyed by Beet and Stag Buster. Forkloid is voiced by Nobuaki Kanemitsu.
- Drilloid 2: A Metaloid that Enter created from an electric drill via the Horu Ver.2 Metavirus. He is tasked with distracting the Go-Busters while Drillzord 2 teleports underground to harvest untapped Enetron, but is destroyed by Yellow and Stag Buster. Drilloid 2 is voiced by Tomokazu Sugita.
- Spannerloid: A Metaloid that Enter created from a wrench via the Barasu Metavirus who is equipped with a gun that allows him to instantaneously disassemble any machine. He is tasked with disabling the Buster Machines and Buddyroids, but is destroyed by Red and Beet Buster. Spannerloid is voiced by Kenta Miyake.
- Filmloid: A Metaloid that Enter created from a movie projector via the Miseru Metavirus who is equipped with a chest-mounted projector capable of creating holograms. At Enter's suggestion, he uses his abilities to trap the Go-Busters in projections of their greatest desires, but is destroyed by Red Buster. Filmloid is voiced by Kenichi Suzumura.
- Dumbbellloid: A Metaloid that Enter created from a dumbbell via the Kitaeru Metavirus who is equipped with a large weight. A passionate trainer, he uses his dumbbells to force people to exercise against their will, threatening to kill them if they do not follow his fitness program, until he is destroyed by Blue Buster. Dumbbellloid is voiced by Jūrōta Kosugi.
- Keyloid: A Metaloid that Escape created from a motorcycle key via the Tojiru Metavirus who is equipped with a key arm capable of locking any object. He is tasked with trapping humans as part of Escape's desire to cause human suffering, but is destroyed by Blue, Beet, and Stag Buster. Keyloid is voiced by Gō Inoue.
- Jisyakuloid: A Metaloid that Escape created from a toy magnet via the Kuttsuku Metavirus who is equipped with the Polar Needle headband, which allows him to magnetize anything he hits and cause them to either attract or repel other objects he hit. He is tasked with using his abilities on people until Yellow Buster destroys the headband and all five Go-Busters destroy the Metaloid. Jisyakuloid is voiced by Takeshi Kusao.
- Wataameloid: A Metaloid that Enter created from a cotton candy machine via the Karametoru Metavirus who is equipped with cotton candy sticks capable of absorbing Enetron from any machine, such as shots from the Go-Busters' Ichigan Busters. He is tasked with siphoning Enetron from the summer festival to help Enter regain his standing with Messiah, but is destroyed by Blue and Yellow Buster. Wataameloid is voiced by Toshiharu Sakurai.
- Rousokuloid: A Metaloid that Escape created from a candle via the Kowagaraseru Metavirus who is equipped with the Shokudai Rod and a hypnotic flame capable of lulling people to sleep and forcing them to experience their worst nightmare, which will eventually kill them. He attempts to take control of a television station to spread his abilities across Japan, but is destroyed by Yellow, Beet, and Stag Buster. Rousokuloid is voiced by Keiichi Nanba.
- Keshigomuloid: A tiny Metaloid that Enter created from an eraser via the Kesu Metavirus who is capable of erasing data, performing powerful headbutts, and firing a powerful laser. After being abandoned by Enter, who believed the transformation failed, Keshigomuloid attempts to erase the EMC and Buddyroids' data, but is destroyed by Red Buster. Keshigomuloid is voiced by Kyousei Tsukui.
- Mushikagoloid: A Metaloid that Enter created from a bug cage via the Kakusu Metavirus who is capable of projecting walls and steel cages. He is tasked with using the Living Body Program Research Institute's surveillance system to turn the facility into a labyrinth so Enter can evolve Messiah, but is destroyed by Red, Yellow, and Stag Buster. Mushikagoloid is voiced by Yasuhiro Takato.
- Sprayloid 2: A Metaloid that Enter created from a spray gun via the Nuru Metavirus who is equipped with a spray gun capable of spraying water-soluble paint capable of altering targets' appearances. He is tasked with distracting Beet Buster from Messiah's attempts to reach the real world and figure out Red Buster's Weak Point. Sprayloid succeeds in the latter task before he is destroyed by the Go-Busters. Sprayloid is voiced by Yūya Murakami.
- Danganloid 2: A Metaloid that Enter created off-screen via the Utsu Ver.2 Metavirus and tasked with destroying the Go-Busters to avenge Messiah's apparent destruction. Despite entering Makuu Space and becoming three times more powerful, he is destroyed by Red Buster and Gavan. Danganloid is voiced by Naoya Nosaka.
- Parabolaloid 2: A Metaloid that Escape created from a satellite dish via the Sagasu Ver.2 Metavirus. He is tasked with locating the remaining Messiah Cards, but is infected by Messiah Card 07, possessed by Messiah, and upgraded into a "Messiahloid", gaining forearms capable of absorbing data from any machine. Despite this, he is downgraded back to his original form by Enter, who takes the card for himself, and destroyed by the Go-Busters. Parabolaloid 2 is voiced by Yūki Ono.
- Denshaloid 2: A Metaloid that Enter created from a train car via the Atsumeru Ver. 2 Metavirus in order to infect its corresponding Megazord with Messiah Card 06. The Metaloid is easily destroyed by Yellow Buster. Denshaloid 2 is voiced by Hironori Kondō.
- Omochiloid: A tiny Metaloid that a pair of Buglers accidentally created from mochi via the Tsuku Metavirus. Being too small to fight the Go-Busters, he attempts to reach a stove in order to enlarge himself to human size. However, he ends up stuck on his back and is easily destroyed by Red Buster Powered Custom. Omochiloid is voiced by Kōichi Sakaguchi.
- Kuwagataloid: A tech-organic Metaloid that Enter created from a stag beetle and a chainlink fence via his enhanced power capable of turning insects and plants into Metaloids. Kugawataloid fights the Go-Busters until he is destroyed by Red Buster Powered Custom and Beet Buster. Voiced by Naoki Imamura.

===== Messiah Metaloids =====
The Messiah Metaloids are Metaloids created from so-called Messiah Cards, Messiah's backup data capable of activating on their own. Enter scatters them to the four winds to select their vessels and siphon a nearby Enetron source before absorbing enough data to become powerful enough to survive the Go-Busters' attacks, potentially allow Messiah to take over one of them, and transmit copies of their data to Messiah Card 13 as part of Enter's master plan.

- Sunadokeiloid: A Metaloid created from Messiah Card 01 infecting an hourglass who is equipped with a chest-mounted hourglass capable of creating sinkhole-like portals that allow him to assimilate anything caught within them and a Messiah-empowered right arm capable of creating barriers and shockwaves. He intends to assimilate Red Buster in order to become a true being, but is destroyed by the Go-Busters in their Powered Custom forms. Sunadokeiloid is voiced by Tomohiro Tsuboi.
- Puppetloid: A Metaloid created from Messiah Card 08 infecting a hand puppet who is equipped with the right arm-mounted Nottoru Puppet, which allows him to take control of and analyze a living body, and a Messiah-empowered right leg that grants enhanced jumping and leaping capabilities. Enter tasks him with using his powers on Beet Buster so the former can better understand the Go-Busters before using his thrall to attack the city. However, Red Buster frees his comrade before turning into his Powered Custom form to destroy Puppetloid. Puppetloid is voiced by Hiroki Shimowada.
- Bulldozerloid: A Metaloid created from Messiah Card 05 infecting a bulldozer who is equipped with tread-like legs and Messiah-empowered forearms that increase his dozer blade-like arms' destructive capabilities. He collects data on buildings' durability until he is destroyed by Red Buster Powered Custom via the Lio Blaster. Bulldozerloid is voiced by Hisao Egawa.
- Tiaraloid: A Metaloid created from Messiah Card 02 infecting a tiara who is equipped with a tiara-like boomerang, the ability to extract and digitize women's love, and a Messiah-empowered left arm that can create energy spheres from her nails. Enter deems her useless to his plot, but Escape takes Tiaraloid under her wing to help her better understand love. However, Tiaraloid is destroyed by Blue Buster Powered Custom. Tiaraloid is voiced by Aki Toyosaki.
- Domeloid: A giant Metaloid created from Messiah Card 11 infecting a stadium who is capable of disguising himself as the object that created him and trapping targets within his personal boxing ring-like pocket dimension. He traps Red Buster and Go-Buster Ace inside his Hyper Space and pits him against his Megazord counterparts to collect combat data, but is destroyed by Go-Buster King. Domeloid is voiced by Yoshiyuki Kono.
- Karateloid: A Metaloid created from Messiah Card 03 infecting a pair of karate sparring gloves belonging to a boy named Kenta Sawai who is equipped with a Messiah-empowered left leg capable of moving too fast for the naked eye to perceive. Initially using Kenta to collect data on human fighting styles, Karateloid uses an Enetron tank to manifest his physical form and battle Blue Buster Powered Custom before the latter receives help from Yellow Buster Powered Custom and the Lio Blaster in destroying the Metaloid. Karateloid is voiced by Hiroyuki Muraoka.
- Loupeloid: A Metaloid created from Messiah Card 10 infecting a magnifying glass who possesses a gentleman thief-esque personality, a walking stick, shoulder-mounted Loupe Bazookas, and a Messiah-empowered right leg that grants enhanced speed and jumping capabilities. He extracts and digitizes data on human greed from collectors before he is eventually destroyed by the Go-Busters in their Powered Custom forms. Loupleloid is voiced by Hiroki Yasumoto.
- Megazordloid: A giant Metaloid created from Messiah Card 06 infecting Denshazord 2 who can disguise himself as a regular train and travel between the real world and Hyper Space. He abducts people to gather data on despair and hope in order to reformat the Type-Delta Megazord within him into Megazord Zeta. Blue and Yellow Buster destroy Megazordloid's dynamo to rescue his hostages before Buster Hercules destroys the Metaloid, though Megazord Zeta emerges anyway. Megazordloid is voiced by Hiroki Takahashi.
- Kentateloid: A hybrid Metaloid that Enter created from the male samurai-like Kenloid, who was created from Messiah Card 09 infecting a katana, and the female knight-like Tateloid, who was created from Messiah Card 12 infecting a shield. Enter tasks Kentateloid with collecting data on human rage by attacking the Go-Busters. While Red Buster controls his anger to defeat Kentateloid with the Lio Blaster Final Buster Mode, Enter uses the Messiah Cards to enhance the Type-Zeta Megazord. Kentateloid is voiced simultaneously by Daisuke Kishio and Kanae Oki.

===== Other Metaloids =====
- CDloid: A Metaloid that Enter created from a compact disc via the Naru (鳴る, "to ring") Metavirus who is equipped with a speaker capable of playing discordant sound. He is tasked with assisting Enter in taking control of the EMC's headquarters by weakening the Go-Busters' physical capabilities, but is destroyed by them. CDloid appears exclusively in the special drama sessions of the first original soundtrack and is voiced by Chō.
- Steamloid: A Metaloid that Enter created from a factory pipe via the Sabiru (錆びる, "to rust") Metavirus who can convert water into steam capable of rusting the unique alloy used in the Buddyroids, Buster Machines, and Megazords' construction. He is tasked with protecting a teleportation device that Enter secretly installed in the Tokyo Enetower to send the surrounding area into Hyper Space, but is destroyed by the Go-Busters. Steamloid appears exclusively in the film Tokumei Sentai Go-Busters the Movie: Protect the Tokyo Enetower! and is voiced by Taiten Kusunoki.
- Junkloid: A scrap metal-themed Metaloid that Enter created from previously destroyed Metaloids who is capable of switching out his limbs for those of other Metaloids and utilizing their abilities. He assists Enter until he is destroyed by Red and Beet Buster. Junkloid is voiced by Ibuki.

==== Megazords ====
The Megazords are giant robots built by the EMC during their early research into Enetron before Messiah took over the Megazords' programming and turned them against the EMC. Vaglass are capable of reformatting the Megazords by downloading a Metaloid's Metavirus, granting them the latter's attributes, and teleporting them from Hyper Space to attack the city for its Enetron. The EMC developed three distinct Megazord models: the speed-oriented Type Alpha, the brute force-oriented Type Beta, and the multi-purpose Type Gamma. Later in the series, Vaglass steals the BC-04's specs to develop the parasitic, destructive Type Delta model.

- Shovelzord: A Type Beta Megazord created from Shovelloid's Metavirus that is equipped with the Metaloid's shovel arm and a powerful manipulator claw. It is deployed to siphon Enetron, but it is destroyed by Go-Buster Ace.
- Burnerzord: A Type Alpha Megazord created from Burnerloid's Metavirus. It is deployed to obtain an Enetron tank, but it and its two Bugzords are destroyed by Go-Buster Ace.
- Needlezord: A modified Type Beta Megazord created from Needloid's Metavirus that can fire explosive needles. It is deployed to bring an Enetron tank into Hyper Space, but it is destroyed by Go-Buster Ace.
- Cutterzord: A Type Gamma Megazord created from Cutterloid's Metavirus that is equipped with Cutterloid's saw arm, the ability to project a force-field, absorb Enetron with its optics, and shoot missiles from its left hand. It is deployed to siphon Enetron and transmit it to Hyper Space, with Enter shutting it down and abandoning it once the job is done. The EMC take the Cutterzord back for analysis, but Enter reactivates it to kill the Go-Busters. Despite receiving aid from the Sprayzord, both Megazords are destroyed by Go-BusterOh.
- Tirezord: A Type Alpha Megazord created from Tireloid's Metavirus that possesses superhuman strength, superhuman speed, and the ability to shoot energy blasts from its fingers. It is deployed to disrupt an Enetron transport convoy, but it is destroyed by Go-Buster Ace.
- Sprayzord: A Type Beta Megazord created from Sprayloid's Metavirus equipped with the Metaloid's spray gun arm that is capable of spraying acidic mist. It is deployed to assist the Cutterzord in killing the Go-Busters, but both Megazords are destroyed by Go-BusterOh.
- Denshazord: A Type Alpha Megazord created from Denshaloid's Metavirus that is equipped with a chest laser and the ability to combine with its two Bugzords. It is deployed to deliver stolen Enetron to Vaglass, but it is destroyed by Go-BusterOh.
- Drillzord: A Type Alpha Megazord created from Drilloid's Metavirus that is equipped with the Metaloid's drill arms, which allow it burrow underground at superhuman speed, and lasers. It is deployed to attack the EMC and Enetron tanks from underground, but is destroyed by Go-BusterOh. As its Bugzords survived, Enter uses them in a later scheme until they are destroyed by the Buster Machines.
- Danganzord: A Type Gamma Megazord created from Danganloid's Metavirus that is equipped with a sword and a large gun. It is deployed to transport a Deltarium 39 crate into Hyper Space, which it succeeds in before it is destroyed by Go-BusterOh.
- Fanzord: A Type Beta Megazord created from Fanloid's Metavirus that is equipped with the Metaloid's turbine along with powerful thrusters. It is deployed to siphon Enetron, but is destroyed by Go-Buster Ace.
- Copyzord: A Type Alpha Megazord created from Copyloid's Metavirus that is equipped with a high-grade camera and a holographic projector. It is deployed to thin out the Go-Busters' ranks while Copyloid steals Hong Kong actress Angie Sue's earrings, but it is destroyed by Go-BusterOh.
- Tubazord: A Type Alpha Megazord created from Tubaloid's Metavirus that is equipped with the Metaloid's ability to fire sonic blasts capable of marking targets. It successfully marks Go-Buster Ace for destruction by Tubazord 2 before it is destroyed by the former.
- Tubazord 2: A Type Beta Megazord created from Tubaloid 2's Metavirus that is equipped with multiple tubas of varying size, which are all capable of firing concussive sonic blasts and destroying anything the first Tubazord marked. It is deployed to destroy Go-Buster Ace, but it is damaged by the GT-02 Gorilla before it is destroyed by Go-BusterOh.
- Soujikizord: A Type Gamma Megazord created from Soujikiloid's Metavirus that is equipped with a stronger version of the Metaloid's vacuum arm called the High Power Cleaner. It is deployed to steal an Enetron tank, but it is destroyed by Go-BusterOh.
- Parabolazord: A Type Alpha Megazord created from Parabolaloid's Metavirus that is equipped with a VHF antenna that doubles as a spear. It is initially sent to steal an Enetron tank before Enter takes manual control of it and its Bugzords to attack the Go-Busters, though the Megazords are destroyed by Go-Buster Ace, the BC-04 Beetle, and the SJ-05 Stag Beetle.
- Forkzord: A Type Beta Megazord created from Forkloid's Metavirus that is equipped with a stronger version of the Metaloid's trident arm. It is deployed to transfer the newly developed Type Delta Megazord into reality while pretending to attack an Enetron tank before both Megazords are destroyed by the GT-02 Gorilla, the BC-04 Beetle, and the SJ-05 Stag Beetle.
- Drillzord 2: A Type Alpha Megazord created from Drilloid 2's Metavirus and an upgraded version of the previous model that is equipped with shoulder-mounted drills and four Bugzords. It is deployed 3,000 m underground to mine for untapped Enetron, but it is dragged to the surface and destroyed by Go-Buster Beet.
- Spannerzord: A Type Gamma Megazord created from Spannerloid's Metavirus that is equipped with giant wrenches capable of disassembling other Megazords. It is deployed to release a Type Delta Megazord, but both are destroyed by Go-BusterOh and Buster Hercules.
- Filmzord: A Type Beta Megazord created from Filmloid's Metavirus that is capable of protecting a Hyper Space bubble. While it is destroyed by Great Go-Buster, Enter recognizes Filmzord's potential and equips future Vaglass Megazords with copies of its Hyper Space projector.
- Dumbbellzord: A Type Beta Megazord created from Dumbbellloid's Metavirus that is equipped with a pair of dumbbells. Shortly after it is deployed, it is destroyed by the GT-02 Gorilla.
- Keyzord: A Type Alpha Megazord created from Keyloid's Metavirus that is equipped with the Metaloid's locking ability and Filmzord's Hyper Space projector. It is deployed to kill the Go-Busters, but is destroyed by Great Go-Buster.
- Jisyakuzord: A Type Gamma Megazord created from Jisyakuloid's Metavirus that is equipped with the Metaloid's magnetic abilities. It is deployed to siphon Enetron by magnetizing it, but Go-Buster Beet takes back the Enetron it stole before it is destroyed by Go-BusterOh.
- Wataamezord: A Type Beta Megazord created from Wataameloid's Metavirus that is equipped with the Metaloid's cotton candy sticks, which can produce a sticky substance capable of directly siphoning Enetron from a tank, and the ability to produce energy waves from its head. It is deployed to siphon Enetron, but it is destroyed by Go-Buster Ace, Go-Buster Beet, and the SJ-05 Stag Beetle.
- Rousokuzord: A Type Alpha Megazord created from Rousokuloid's Metavirus equipped with the Super Chakka Gun flamethrower and a candlestick-like blade. It is sent to steal an Enetron tank, but it is destroyed by Buster Hercules.
- Keshigomuzord: A Type Gamma Megazord created from Keshigomuloid's Metavirus that is equipped with the Metaloid's eraser arm. It is deployed to release a Type Delta Megazord and delete the Buster Machine's programming data, but it is destroyed by Go-BusterOh before it can succeed in the former task.
- Mushikagozord: A Type Beta Megazord created from Mushikagoloid's Metavirus that is equipped with the arm-mounted Kanshi Machine Guns and an upgraded version of Filmzord's Hyper Space projector capable of compressing the projection. It is deployed to attack the Go-Busters, but they use Great Go-Buster to temporarily negate the Hyper Space projection before destroying the Mushikagozord.
- Sprayzord 2: A Type Alpha Megazord created from Sprayloid 2's Metavirus that is equipped with aerosol paint capable of disguising itself as a building. It is deployed to attack the Go-Busters, but it is destroyed by Buster Hercules with help from the EMC.
- Danganzord 2: A Type Gamma Megazord created from Danganloid 2's Metavirus that is equipped with a large left arm-mounted gun. It is deployed to attack the Go-Busters, but it is destroyed by Buster Hercules.
- Parabolazord 2: A Type Gamma Megazord created from Parabolaloid 2's Metavirus that is equipped with a laser rifle. Shortly after it is deployed, it is destroyed by Go-Buster Ace and Go-Buster LiOh.
- Denshazord 2: A Type Alpha Megazord created from Denshaloid 2's Metavirus that is equipped with powerful armor and greater speed than the previous model. It is deployed so Enter can convert it into Megazordloid while it ostensibly steals an Enetron tank.
- Omochizord: A Type Alpha Megazord created from Omochiloid's Metavirus that is equipped with the Chikaramochi Arm, which it can use to fire mochi. Due to the accidental nature of Omochiloid's creation, Omochizord lacks a purpose and acts randomly until it is destroyed by Go-Buster Beet, Tategami LiOh, and the SJ-05 Stag Beetle.
- Kuwagatazord: A Type Beta Megazord created from Kuwagataloid's data that is equipped with the Scissor Stagger Head and flight capabilities. It is deployed to attack the Go-Busters until it is destroyed by Go-Buster Beet and SJ-05 Stag Beetle.

===== Messiah Megazords =====
Messiah Megazords are stronger versions of the regular Vaglass Megazords. Unlike the previous iterations, Type Delta Megazords can be reformatted into a Messiah Megazord.

- Sunadokeizord: A Type Alpha Megazord created from Sunadokeiloid's data that is equipped with a right arm-mounted drill capable of absorbing data and storing it in a left arm-mounted hourglass. It is deployed to kill the Go-Busters, but is destroyed by Buster Hercules.
- Puppetzord: A Type Gamma Megazord created from Puppetloid's data that is equipped with the right arm-mounted Mega Nottoru Puppet, which allows it to control other Megazords. It is deployed to kill the Go-Busters, but it is destroyed by Go-BusterOh.
- Bulldozerzord: A Type Delta Megazord created from Bulldozerloid's data that is equipped with the Metaloid's arms. It is deployed to attack the Go-Busters, but it is destroyed by Go-Buster LiOh.
- Tiarazord: A Type Beta Megazord created from Tiaraloid's data that is capable of firing energy beams from its tiara, deploy tiara-shaped fighter jets, and flying. It is deployed to attack the Go-Busters, but it is destroyed by Go-Buster Ace and Tategami LiOh.
- Domezord Alpha: A Type Alpha Megazord created from Domeloid's data that is equipped with a trident-like arm. Domeloid sends it in to obtain combat data on Go-Buster Ace, which destroys Domezord Alpha.
- Domezord Beta: A Type Beta Megazord created from Domeloid's weightlifting data that is equipped with a large dumbbell. Domeloid sends it and Domezord Gamma to obtain combat data on Go-Buster Ace, which tricks the latter into destroying Domezord Beta.
- Domezord Gamma: A Type Gamma Megazord created from Domeloid's kickboxing data. Domeloid sends it and Domezord Beta to obtain combat data on Go-Buster Ace, but Domezord Gamma is destroyed by Go-Buster King.
- Domezord Delta: A Type Delta Megazord created from Domeloid's boxing data. Domeloid sends it to assist Domezord Gamma, but it is destroyed by Go-Buster King.
- Karatezord: A Type Beta Megazord created from Karateloid's data that is equipped with increased punching power. It is deployed to attack the Go-Busters, but it is destroyed by Go-Buster Ace and Buster Hercules.
- Loupezord: A Type Alpha Megazord created from Loupeloid's data that is capable of easily stealing other Megazords' equipment. It is deployed to attack the Go-Busters, but it is destroyed by Buster Hercules and Tategami LiOh.
- Kenzord: A Type Gamma Megazord created from Kenloid's data that is equipped with the Metaloid's sword arm. It is deployed to attack the Go-Busters, but it is destroyed by GT-02 Gorilla, the RH-03 Rabbit, and Buster Hercules.
- Tatezord: A Type Delta Megazord created from Tateloid's data that is equipped with the Metaloid's shield. It is deployed to attack the Go-Busters, but it is destroyed by Tategami LiOh.

===== Other Megazords =====
- CDzord: A Type Gamma Megazord created from CDloid's Metavirus. It is sent to steal an Enetron tank, but it is destroyed by Go-BusterOh. The CDzord appears exclusively in the special drama sessions of the series' first original soundtrack.

=== Sakurada family ===
==== Rika Sakurada ====
Rika Sakurada is Hiromu's older sister. Because of her dislike of machines, she seldom visited the Transport Research Center. After learning of parents' disappearances, she refused to allow Hiromu to become a Go-Buster for fear of losing him as well. Upon learning that he did so anyway, she slowly grows to accept his decision and accept Cheeda Nick into her family.

In an alternate timeline where Messiah never came to exist, depicted in the V-Cinema special Tokumei Sentai Go-Busters Returns vs. Doubutsu Sentai Go-Busters, Rika idolizes Hiromu after he joins the Doubutsu Sentai Go-Busters team, was inspired by him to become unofficial member Pink Cat, and joined the Go-Busters in their final battle against the Mechalius Empire.

Rika Sakurada is portrayed by Risa Yoshiki. As a teenager, she is portrayed by Rin Mizumoto.

==== Yosuke Sakurada ====
Yosuke Sakurada is Hiromu and Rika's father, the chief of the Transport Research Center, and the only known scientist to have devised a way to install programs into humans. Thirteen years prior to the series, he, his wife Michiko, and their scientists sacrificed themselves to trap Messiah in Hyper Space and were digitized into him. Despite this, Yosuke managed to retain some of his free will and makes contact with Masato Jin to aid Hiromu and the Go-Busters, who eventually succeed in destroying Messiah at Yosuke and the other digitized scientists' request.

Yosuke Sakurada is portrayed by So Yamanaka.

==== Michiko Sakurada ====
Michiko Sakurada is Hiromu and Rika's mother and a staff member of the Transport Research Center, before she sacrificed herself to trap Messiah in Hyper Space 13 years ago.

Michiko Sakurada is portrayed by Michiko Hosokoshi.

== Other characters ==
- Angie Sue: A popular Hong Kong actress who resembles Yoko and is targeted by Vaglass for her rare earrings. Angie Sue is portrayed by Arisa Komiya, who also portrays Yoko Usami.
- Kei Usami: Yoko's mother who worked for the Transport Research Center as a Megazord pilot and engineer thirteen years prior to the series. Like the others involved, Kei was digitized and absorbed by Messiah. After Hiromu destroys Messiah at her behest, Kei's spirit briefly appears before Yoko. Kei Usami is portrayed by Natsuhi Ueno.
- Mika Hazuki: Professor Hazuki's daughter who initially believes the EMC sacrificed her father for their own means. After learning the truth, she supports the Go-Busters and entrusts them to carry on her father's legacy. Mika Hazuki is portrayed by Sayoko Oho.
- Reika Saotome: A cat burglar who adopts the identity of "Pink Buster". Reika Saotome is portrayed by Yua Shinkawa.

== Guest characters ==
- Galaxy Federal Police: An organization from the Metal Hero series that protects Earth and the universe from otherworldly threats.
  - Geki Jumonji: A member of the Galaxy Federal Police who succeeded Gavan/Retsu Ichijouji to become Gavan Type-G. After being tasked with pursuing Rhino Doubler, Jumonji receives the Go-Busters' aid in defeating the Space Mafia Makuu's remnants. During the events of the crossover film Kamen Rider × Super Sentai × Space Sheriff: Super Hero Taisen Z, Jumonji joins forces with the Super Sentai, Kamen Riders, and other members of the Galaxy Federal Police to stop Space Shocker from reviving Demon King Psycho. Geki Jumonji is portrayed by Yuma Ishigaki, who reprises his role from Space Sheriff Gavan: The Movie.
  - Shelly: Jumonji's assistant from the Planet Bird who owns a visual illusion device that allows her to use "Laser Vision" and transform into a budgerigar. Shelly is portrayed by Suzuka Morita, who reprises her role from Space Sheriff Gavan: The Movie.
- Rhino Doubler: A Double Monster and member of the Space Mafia Makuu, an intergalactic crime syndicate that was defeated by the original Gavan, who possesses a built-in Axial Distorter on his chest that enables him to open a portal to Makuu Space. As one of the surviving members of the revived Makuu syndicate, Rhino Doubler escapes to Earth, but is pursued by Geki Jumonji, the current Gavan, and his partner Shelly and the Go-Busters. After forming a partnership with Enter, Rhino Doubler attempts to send smart individuals to Makuu Space and leave the dimwitted behind in the hopes that they will destroy themselves. After being killed by the Go-Busters and Gavan in Maku Space, Rhino Doubler's body is infected with the Hikizurikomu Metavirus, causing him to be revived as a data-based giant and grant his Axial Distorter access to Hyper Space so he can combine it with Makuu Space. However, Great Go-Buster and Electronic Starbeast Dol destroy Rhino Doubler before he can succeed. Rhino Doubler is voiced by Kōsuke Toriumi.

== Spin-off characters ==
- Kai Hyuga: A member of the Galactic Union Police and Geki Jumonji's senior who succeeded Den Iga to become Sharivan and appears exclusively in the crossover film Kamen Rider × Super Sentai × Space Sheriff: Super Hero Taisen Z. He assists Jumonji, Yoko Usami, and other heroes in combating the revived Space Mafia Makuu. Kai Hyuga is portrayed by Riki Miura.
- Shu Karasuma: A member of the Galactic Union Police who succeeded Dai Sawamura to become Shaider and appears exclusively in the crossover film Kamen Rider × Super Sentai × Space Sheriff: Super Hero Taisen Z. Shu Karasuma is portrayed by Hiroaki Iwanaga.
- Psycholon: A small robotic sphere and a fragment of the Demon King Psycho of the Space Crime Syndicate Madou, which the original Sharivan defeated decades ago, who appears exclusively in the crossover film Kamen Rider × Super Sentai × Space Sheriff: Super Hero Taisen Z. Becoming independent of Psycho's thoughts as Space Shocker made preparations for his resurrection, Psycholon disconnects himself and flees to Earth, where he loses his memory and befriends Yoko Usami. Space Shocker pursues Psycholon and integrate him into Psycho, but Yoko reaches the former, convincing him to fully separate himself, sacrificing himself in the process. After her allies destroy Psycho, they assure her that Psycholon can be repaired. Psycholon is voiced by Nana Mizuki.
- Great Demon Lord Azazel: A giant, scythe-wielding demon who appears exclusively in the V-Cinema special Tokumei Sentai Go-Busters Returns vs. Doubutsu Sentai Go-Busters. On New Year's Eve, 2012, Azazel arrives to destroy Earth, successfully killing the Go-Busters in the process. Using a wish he received from God due to being the one millionth death in 2012, Nick attempts to avert this by creating an alternate timeline where the Doubutsu Sentai Go-Busters fought evil instead, but Azazel kills them as well. Realizing both groups can defeat him, Nick uses his second wish to bring the alternate Go-Busters to the original timeline and help the original Go-Busters kill Azazel before he can destroy Earth. Azazel is voiced by Takuya Kirimoto.
- God: The Judeo-Christian-Islamic deity of the same name who resembles Enter and appears before Nick to grant him a wish as a reward for being the one millionth death in 2012. God is portrayed by Syo Jinnai, who also portrays Enter.
- Machine Empire Mechalius: A group of androids that appear exclusively in the V-Cinema special Tokumei Sentai Go-Busters Returns vs. Doubutsu Sentai Go-Busters. In an alternate timeline that Nick created to remove Messiah, the Mechalius Empire emerged in Vaglass' place to destroy all organic life, only to be opposed by the Doubutsu Sentai Go-Busters.
  - Machine Empress Trange Star: (Note: "Trange Star" is derived from "transistor".) The leader of the Mechalius Empire and Escape's counterpart who is eventually destroyed by the Go-Busters. Trange Star is portrayed by Ayame Misaki, who also portrays Escape.
  - Loaders: The Mechalius Empire's robotic soldiers and the Metaloids' counterparts:
    - Shoveloader: An excavator-themed monster and Shovelloid's counterpart. He is defeated by the Go-Busters, enlarged by Mainteloader, and destroyed by Go-Buster Animal. Shoveloader is voiced by Tatsuya Takagi.
    - Mainteloader: A wrench-themed monster and Spannerloid's counterpart who enlarges his fellow Loaders with an oil pump containing "Bikkuri Oil". Maintainloader is voiced by an uncredited voice actor.
- Atsushi Doumyoji: The sixth member of the Doubutsu Sentai Go-Busters who can transform into Green Hippopotamus and appears exclusively in the V-Cinema special Tokumei Sentai Go-Busters Returns vs. Doubutsu Sentai Go-Busters. After joining the Go-Busters in their battle against the Mechalius Empire, he competes with Hiromu for Yoko's affections until Doumyoji is killed in action. With his dying breath, he tells Hiromu to take care of Yoko for him before dying in his arms. Atsushi Doumyoji is portrayed by Tatsuhisa Suzuki, who also voices Usada Lettuce.
