= Riki =

Riki is a given name. It is a gender-neutral name in Japan (written: 力 or 理貴). Notable people with the name include:

- Riki (footballer, born 1980), Spanish footballer Iván Sánchez-Rico Soto
- Riki (footballer, born 1997), Spanish footballer Ricardo Rodríguez Gil Carcedo
- Riki Blich (born 1979), Israeli actress
- Riki Cakić (born 1990), Bosnian-born Swedish footballer
- Riki Choshu (長州 力; born 1951), ring name of Mitsuo Yoshida, Korean-Japanese professional wrestler
- Riki Christodoulou (born 1988), British racing driver
- Riki Cowan (born 1963), New Zealand rugby union player
- Riki Ellison (born 1960), New Zealand player of American football
- Riki Flutey (born 1980), New Zealand-born English rugby union player
- Riki Fukuda (福田 力; born 1981), Japanese mixed martial artist
- Riki Gal (born 1950), Israeli singer
- Riki Guy (born c. 1975), Israeli opera singer
- Riki Harakawa (原川 力; born 1993), Japanese footballer
- Riki Mauß (マウス力, born 2006), Japanese-German member of Japanese boy group &Team
- Riki Hoeata (born 1988), New Zealand rugby union player
- Riki Kawara (瓦 力; 1937–2013), Japanese politician
- Riki Kitawaki (北脇 里規; born 1985), Japanese footballer
- Riki Kobayashi (1924–2013), American chemical engineer
- Riki Kumeta (born 1983), Japanese karateka
- Riki LeCotey, Canadian cosplayer, model and costume designer
- Riki Lindhome (born 1979), American actress, comedian and musician
- Riki Maiocchi (1940–2004), Italian singer and musician
- Riki (Riccardo Marcuzzo, born 1992), Italian singer
- Riki Matsuda (松田 力; born 1991), Japanese footballer
- Riki Michele, American singer
- Riki Miura (三浦 力; born 1983), Japanese actor
- Riki Nakaya (中矢 力; born 1989), Japanese judoka
- Riki Nishimura (西村力) (born 2005), Japanese member of ENHYPEN
- Riki Ott (born 1954), American marine toxicologist and activist
- Riki Papakura, New Zealand rugby union player
- Riki R. Nelson, American painter
- Riki Rachtman (born 1965), American television and radio personality
- Riki Sorsa (1952–2016), Finnish singer
- Riki Takasaki (高嵜 理貴; born 1970), Japanese footballer
- Riki Takayama (高山 浬希, born 2005), member of Japanese boy group &Team
- Riki Takeuchi (竹内 力; born 1964), Japanese actor
- Riki Turofsky (born 1944), Canadian opera singer, broadcaster and video producer
- Riki van Steeden (born 1976), New Zealand soccer player
- Riki Wessels (born 1985), Australian cricketer
- Riki Wilchins (born 1952), American activist

== Fictional characters ==
- Riki Naoe (直枝 理樹), protagonist of the visual novel Little Busters! and Kud Wafter
- Riki Nendo, a character from the Japanese manga The Disastrous Life of Saiki K.
- Riki Honoo, a character in the tokusatsu series Kousoku Sentai Turboranger
- Riki, a character in the tokusatsu series Chouriki Sentai Ohranger
- Riki, a Nopon and playable character in Xenoblade Chronicles
- Riki, a tengu in the Elfhome series by Wen Spencer

== See also ==
- Rikki
- Ricky (given name)
