= Frederikke =

Frederikke is a Danish feminine given name. The masculine equivalent is Frederik, the English is Frederica, and the diminutive form is Rikke.

Notable people with the name include:

- Frederikke Aspöck (born 1974), Danish film director
- Frederikke Dannemand (1792–1862), Mistress of Danish royalty
- Frederikke Federspiel (1839–1913), Danish photographer
- Frederikke Gulmark (born 1994), Danish handball player
- Frederikke Dahl Hansen (born 1994), Danish television and film actress
- Frederikke Løvenskiold (1785–1876), Danish composer
- Frederikke Charlotte Reventlow (1747–1822), Danish countess and writer
- Frederikke Sofie (born c. 1997), Danish fashion model
- Frederikke Thøgersen (born 1995), Danish footballer
- Frederikke Mørcke (born 2000), Danish canoeist
