= Andrew Foster (musician) =

- Born: Andrew David Foster; 4 October 1980 (age 46); Havant, Hampshire, England
- Genres: Acoustic, folk, pop, psychedelic, rock
- Occupations: Musician, songwriter
- Instrument: Guitar
- Years active: 2007–present
- Label: Green Fish Records
- Website: www.andrewfostermusic.co.uk

Andrew Foster (born 4 October 1980) is a musician active from 2007 living on the South Coast of England. He is a sponsored artist by Adam Black Guitars and has been mentioned in Acoustic Magazine and interviewed on BBC Radio Solent.

Foster has released two EPs, Russell’s Teapot and New Criterion, which were recorded in a project studio in 2012, produced by Guy Gyngell, now a producer, originally from the Portsmouth-based indie band Ricky.

== History ==
By the summer of 2006, Foster had finished working at Gold Crest Audio in Soho, and moved back to Portsmouth.

=== Green Fish Records ===
Foster formed his own record label, Green Fish Records. The name originates from watching goldfish in a bowl and using it as an analogy for channeling frustration and limitation.

=== Music ===
The first release on the new label was on 1 March 2007 and EP entitled Watching Clocks. This featured The Stranglers' drum technician Ian Barnard on drums and 300 copies were sold in limited edition CD format. Watching Clocks EP was the precursor to Foster's debut album, Media Ghost, which was released on 8 September 2008 in CD and digital download. Foster toured the UK promoting his album selling over 1000 CDs. The release did not chart as sales were not counted for that period.

On 21 January 2010 The News Portsmouth published an article about Foster and a gig he was due to play at The Square Brewery, Petersfield. The article quoted Foster's review from Acoustic Magazine and outlined his plans for his second studio album.

Foster's second album, The Garden, was released on 11 May 2010. In early 2013, the title track was remixed by Kassassin Street's Rowan Bastable, featuring Nathan Hill on percussion. This remix was mastered by Pete Maher, a producer for Beady Eye and U2. Foster was supported by Seahorses' Chris Helme at the launch of The Garden at the Half Moon, Putney. The art work for the album was created by American artist Helen Janow.

On 6 March 2011, the album Panic Moon was released; along with an unofficial video for track 7 "Dark Astronaut". This homemade video was made by Foster himself and was based on the adventures of Morph and Doctor Who.

On 8 March 2011, Foster featured in a studio session live on Pure FM playing tracks "Zombie Dance" and "Amy Watches the Stars" from Panic Moon.

Foster and the Watchman played songs from Media Ghost, Panic Moon, The Garden and EP Watching Clocks in a show at The New Theatre Royal in Portsmouth on 4 December 2011. The show started with Neil Armstrong's Apollo 11 transmission playing and finished with a cover of the song "The Great Pretender" by The Platters. This was reviewed in the Portsmouth News. The show was recorded and sold on digital download format. To date this remains the only live album in Foster's catalogue.

In 2012, the EP Russell's Teapot was released. The EP name is said to be inspired by Bertrand Russell and his analogy using the idea of a cosmic teapot. Russell wrote that the philosophic burden of proof lies upon a person making scientifically unfalsifiable claims rather than shifting the burden of proof to others, specifically in the case of religion. The first track of the EP, "Memory Maze", was played on BBC Radio 6 music on the BBC Introducing show. The second song, "I, Alone", includes vocals from Leonie Tremain, who sang the backing vocals on the Eva Cassidy album Somewhere.

The EP New Criterion was released in September 2012. The cover art for this photograph, also entitled New Criterion, was taken by Aaron Bennett Photography and won an award from the National Photographic Society in 2013.

In an article published by The News Portsmouth entitled "A Weekend with: Andrew Foster", Foster revealed a friendship with comedian Shappi Khorsandi and his love of Karl Pilkington, Downton Abbey, Doctor Who and Sherlock. The article also outlined Foster's favourite food to be Spaghetti Bolognese and favourite local day out to be at Kingley Vale in West Stoke Hampshire.

== Present ==
Foster spent 2013 working with Beady Eye mastering engineer Pete Maher on his album Science and Magic, which is due for release in 2014.

A limited edition EP sampler from Science and Magic was sold at Foster's gigs in early 2013.

== Tours and appearances ==
Foster has played in various venues across the country and has toured a number of times across the UK. Additionally he has played at the Eastney Cellars supporting Mumford & Sons and The Bluetones' Mark Morriss, at the Wedgewood Rooms supporting Charlene Soraia and at The Brook supporting Passenger.

On 31 August 2007, Foster supported Hard-Fi as they were Number One in the UK Albums Chart. The gig promoted the release of their second studio album Once Upon a Time in the West and was played at South Parade Pier in Portsmouth.

Foster was also seen supporting McFly on 18 July 2008 at the Big Top Festival in Newquay.

In 2010, 2011, and 2012, Foster toured the UK supporting English Rock vocalist and guitarist Terry Reid. Foster toured with Reid in early 2013, playing various venues across the South of England including The Komedia in Brighton and The Borderline in London.

Foster has played the Annual Nick Drake Gathering in Tanworth-in-Arden in 2009, 2010,2011, 2012 and 2013 playing covers of Nick Drake songs "Northern Sky", "Hanging on a Star", "Day is Done", and "Been Smoking Too Long".

In the summer of 2012, Foster played the Kashmir Tent at the Isle of Wight Festival.

Foster performed a headline show at The Spring Arts and Heritage Centre in Havant on 20 June 2013.

In the summer of 2013, Foster was mentioned in The Isle of Wight County Press as having played the Kashmir Tent at The Isle of Wight Festival. Foster is also noted to have played the Big Top Stage at Wickham Festival 2013.

== Musical equipment ==
The musical equipment used by Foster is outlined in his EPs' and albums' booklets.

=== Acoustics ===
Adam Black Guitars: S8 Dreadnought, O5/12CE 12 string, O5 6 string,

Washburn: Cumberland Jumbo Acoustic

Eko: Ranger 12 string

Suzuki: Spanish Nylon

=== Electrics ===
Ibanez: Artist Series Semi Hollow Body 1980

Fender Squire: 50's Classic Vibe Stratocaster

Peavey: Rockingham Jazz with fitted Bigsby

=== Amplification ===
Session Rockette 30, Vox AC30, VRVox AC4

=== Effects ===
Electroharmonix Superego, Ibanez DE7, Danelectro Cool Cat, Boss SD1, Artec Fuzz Town, Digitech Clapton Crossroads

=== Synths ===
Korg Microkorg

=== Strings ===
Ernie Ball Regular/Hybrid/Power Slinkys

D'addario Medium/Light Bronze Wound

== Discography ==
Russell's Teapot EP

- Released: March 2012
- Format: CD and Digital Download
- Label: Green Fish Records
- Writer: Andrew Foster
- Producer: Guy Gyngell
- Tracks: Memory Maze, I Alone, Eyes to the Sky, Weird Science

New Criterion EP

- Released: September 2012
- Format: CD and Digital Download
- Label: Green Fish Records
- Writer: Andrew Foster
- Producer: Guy Gyngell
- Tracks: Heart Beats, City Speed, New Criterion, Lucky

"Science and Magic Limited Edition Sampler EP" (A sampler EP) from the album Science and Magic

- Released: June 2013
- Format: CD
- Label: Green Fish Records
- Writer: Andrew Foster
- Director: Pete Maher
- Sales: 600 Limited Edition CDs sold at Andrew Foster gigs in early 2013
- Tracks: Personal Legend (Science and Magic remix), Phobos.
- Bonus tracks: Intersteller (demo)
