= Ricky's =

Ricky's may refer to:

- Ricky's All Day Grill, a restaurant chain in Canada
- Ricky's Sports Theatre and Grill, a sports bar in San Leandro, California
