= We Are England =

Single by Ricky
- B-side: "That, My Girl, Is True"
- Released: June 12, 2006
- Genre: Indie Rock
- Length: 4:09
- Label: Crazy Beat Records
- Songwriter(s): Jim Lines; Chris Lenton; Crain Leworthy
- Producer(s): Jim Lines; Guy Gyngell; Gordon Mills

"We Are England" is a single released by British indie band Ricky on 12 June 2006. The song is an indie ballad which celebrates the national team in time for the 2006 FIFA World Cup, and is a charity record with profits going to the NSPCC.

The single reached Number 3 in the UK Indie Singles chart and charted on the Official Singles Chart Top 100 of the week 25 June to 1 July 2006. However, unlike Stan Boardman's "World Cup Song", the Crazy Frog's "We Are The Champions" or Sham 69's "Hurry Up England", it failed to be in the Top 40 rundown for that week, with "We Are England" charting for one week at number 54.
