= Space Sheriff Gavan: The Movie =

Japanese name
- Kanji: 宇宙刑事ギャバン THE MOVIE
Transcriptions
- Revised Hepburn: Uchū Keiji Gyaban Za Mūbī
- Directed by: Osamu Kaneda
- Written by: Yūji Kobayashi
- Produced by: Jun Hikasa; Kazuo Kato; Gen Sato; Motoi Sasaki
- Starring: Yuma Ishigaki; Takuya Nagaoka; Yukari Taki; Suzuka Morita; Honoka; Riki Miura; Hiroaki Iwanaga; Toshiaki Nishizawa; Kenji Ohba
- Narrated by: Kiyoshi Kobayashi
- Cinematography: Wataru Kikuchi
- Edited by: Ren Sato
- Music by: Michiaki Watanabe; Kousuke Yamashita
- Production companies: Toei Company; TV Asahi; Toei Video; Kinoshita Group; Toei Agency; Bandai; Nippon Columbia
- Distributed by: Toei Company
- Release date: 20 October 2012
- Running time: 83 minutes
- Country: Japan
- Language: Japanese

Space Sheriff Gavan: The Movie (宇宙刑事ギャバン THE MOVIE, Uchū Keiji Gyaban Za Mūbī) is a 2012 Japanese tokusatsu superhero film to commemorate the 30th Anniversary of the Metal Hero Series' first entry, Space Sheriff Gavan, and is a sequel to the Space Sheriff series. Kenji Ohba, Toshiaki Nishizawa, and Shōzō Iizuka reprise their roles from the original television series.

== Plot ==
Fulfilling their fifteen-year-old childhood dream to venture into space, Geki Jumonji and Tooya Okuma join SARD and take a mission to Mars with their childhood friend Itsuki Kawai giving them good luck pendants so she can be with them in spirit. However, the two are labelled MIA when their space shuttle (based on the HOPE concept) mysteriously disappears. A year later, while remembering her friends, Itsuki finds the SARD complex being attacked by a murderous monster and runs for her life with her pursuer catching up to her. By then, a silver-armored figure named Gavan appears and battles the monster as he is revealed to be Zan Vardo of the Space Mafia Makuu. As they fight, Zan Vardo holds Itsuki hostage until he is hit by an attack of an unknown origin, allowing Gavan to seemingly finish him off with his Gavan Dynamic and rescue Itsuki, who recognizes him as Geki as he boards the Dolgiran without further explanations. Summoned to Planet Bird, it is revealed that Geki has spent the last year training at the Galactic Union and now works as a provisional Space Sheriff in the Gavan-Type G combat suit. Geki is reprimanded by Commander Qom for failing to protect the data that was taken during the fight by Lizard Doubler with the consideration to have Kai Hyuga/Sharivan and Shu Karasuma/Shaider take over. However, Geki convinces Qom to give him another chance and returns to Earth.

Upon his return, Geki meets with Itsuki and takes her into the Dolgran where she meets his partner Shelly of Planet Bird. Refusing to tell her the truth about what happened with him and Tooya during the mission one year before, Geki's search takes him to Oyama Energy Laboratory where a meteor is being researched. However, Geki finds himself being attacked by the scientists and security as Shelly fails to stop Makuu's Witch Kill from obtaining the meteor which is needed to resurrect Don Horror. Kill takes her leave as Geki and Shelly escape with their lives, with Itsuki finding Toya's pendant among the wreckage. Geki later revealed to Shelly how he ended up drifting in space after his shuttle exploded and Toya sucked into the vortex's event horizon. By that time, after she broke the code with Shelly pinpointing the location, Itsuki has Geki take her to the location. There, she sees an illusion of Tooya as she and Geki follow it into a trap set up by Makuu's leader Brighton. Overpowering Geki in his Gavan Type-G, Bright takes Itsuki into Makuu Space while having Kill, Zan Vardo, Lizard Doubler, a group of Crushers deal with the Space Sheriff. Luckily, the original Gavan arrives to even the odds and get Geki to safety, revealed to have been the one who saved Geki from drifting space and during his fight with Zan Vardo.

Learning from Commander Qom that he has been relieved of duty, Geki finds himself being attacked by Gavan as he ends the youth's indecision as only he can stop the rebirth of Don Horror. The two then find themselves attacked by Lizard Doubler, with Geki saving Shelly before the Doubler sends the two into Makuu Space where he becomes three-times as powerful. After successfully escaping Makuu Space, the two Gavans don their combat suits and Gavan stays behind to destroy Lizard Doubler so Gavan Type-G can proceed to space, destroying an entire fleet of Makuu ships with the Electronic Starbeast Dol before reaching what remained of Makuu Castle. With Sharivan and Shaider holding off Witch Kill and Zan Vardo, Gavan Type-G finally reaches Itsuki and Brighton, revealed to be Tooya.

Revealing that he pledged himself to Don Horror while trapped in another dimension, Tooya intends to kill Geki for not saving him while offering Itsuki's body to Don Horror so he can possess her and engulf the entire universe in Makuu Space. With no option left, with Itsuki trying to fight out of the possession, Gavan Type-G mortally wounds Brighton with a Gavan Dynamic to end the ritual. With Makuu Castle beginning to self-destruct, Geki manages to save Toya from falling into the abyss as they and Itsuki escape on Dol. Back on Earth, an agonizing Tooya finally reconciles with Geki and Itsuki before dying to his friends' dismay. Shelly later informs that in recognition to his efforts, the Galactic Union Patrol officially establishes Geki as the new Gavan. Geki then departs from Earth with Shelly, leaving behind a letter to Itsuki, where he states that he will return to meet her again once he accomplishes his duty as a Space Sheriff.

== Characters ==
- Space Sheriffs (宇宙刑事, Uchū Keiji)
  - Geki Jumonji (十文字 撃, Jūmonji Geki) is a member of the Galactic Union Police (銀河連邦警察, Ginga Renpō Keisatsu) who succeeded its veteran member Retsu Ichijouji as the current Gavan, referred to as Gavan Type-G (ギャバンタイプG, Gyaban Taipu Jī), shouting "Jōchaku" (蒸着; "Deposition") whenever he needs the Super Dimensional Highspeed Ship Dolgiran (超次元高速機ドルギラン, Chō Jigen Kōsokuki Dorugiran) he is based on to encase him in Granium particles that form into his Gavan Type-G combat suit within .05 of a second (as reinforced in Space Squad). As the new Gavan, Geki battled the revived Space Mafia Makuu and defeated its masked leader Brighton who was originally his best friend Toya Okuma. Soon after, Geki is redeployed to Earth to pursue Rhino Doubler, getting the Go-Busters' aid in defeating one of Makuu's remaining agents.
  - Kai Hyuga (日向 快, Hyūga Kai) is a member of the Galactic Union Police who succeeded its veteran member Den Iga as the current Sharivan (シャリバン, Shariban), shouting "Sekisha" (赤射; Red Shine) whenever he needs the spaceship Grand Berth (グランドバース, Gurando Bāsu) he is based on to encase him in Solar Metal particles that form into his combat suit within milliseconds. As Geki's senior, Kai aided him against the revived Space Mafia Makuu, and later aids him, Shaider, and other super heroes during the events of the crossover film Kamen Rider × Super Sentai × Space Sheriff: Super Hero Taisen Z.
  - Shu Karasuma (烏丸 舟, Karasuma Shū) is a member of the Galactic Union Police who succeeded its veteran member Dai Sawamura as the current Shaider (シャイダー, Shaidā), shouting "Shōketsu" (焼結; Sinter) whenever he needs the spaceship Vavilos (バビロス, Babirosu) he is based on to bathe him with Plasma Blue Energy emitted from the Vavilos to form his armor within milliseconds. He later aids his fellow Space Sheriffs and other super heroes during the events of the crossover film Kamen Rider × Super Sentai × Space Sheriff: Super Hero Taisen Z.
  - Gavan/Retsu Ichijouji (ギャバン/一条寺 烈, Gyaban/Ichijōji Retsu) is Geki's predecessor.
- Shelly (シェリー, Sherī) is Commander Qom's niece and Geki's assistant from Planet Bird, owning a visual illusion device allows her to use "Laser Vision," transforming into a budgerigar. While separated from Geki, Shelly meets the Go-Busters and becomes friends with Yoko.

== V-Cinema ==
=== Next Generation ===
Space Sheriffs: Next Generation (宇宙刑事 NEXT GENERATION, Uchū Keiji Nekusuto Jenerēshon) is a set of two V-Cinema releases that focus on side stories of Kai Hyuga as the current Sharivan and Shu Karasuma as the current Shaider.

=== Space Squad ===
In 2016, it was announced on Toei's press release that a crossover between Gavan and Tokusou Sentai Dekaranger, titled Space Squad: Space Sheriff Gavan vs. Tokusou Sentai Dekaranger (スペース・スクワッド 宇宙刑事ギャバンVS特捜戦隊デカレンジャー, Supēsu Sukuwaddo Uchū Keiji Gyaban Tai Tokusō Sentai Dekarenjā) is set to be released in 2017.

== Cast ==
- Geki Jumonji (十文字 撃, Jūmonji Geki): Yuma Ishigaki (石垣 佑磨, Ishigaki Yūma)
- Toya Okuma (Brighton) (大熊 遠矢（ブライトン）, Ōkuma Tōoya (Buraiton)): Takuya Nagaoka (永岡 卓也, Nagaoka Takuya)
- Itsuki Kawai (河井 衣月, Kawai Itsuki): Yukari Taki (滝 裕可里, Taki Yukari)
- Shelly (シェリー, Sherī): Suzuka Morita (森田 涼花, Morita Suzuka)
- Kai Hyuga (日向 快, Hyūga Kai): Riki Miura (三浦 力, Miura Riki)
- Shu Karasuma (烏丸 舟, Karasuma Shū): Hiroaki Iwanaga (岩永 洋昭, Iwanaga Hiroaki)
- Eleena (エリーナ, Erīna): Honoka (穂花)
- Witch Kill (魔女キル, Majo Kiru): Sanae Hitomi (人見 早苗, Hitomi Sanae)
- Section Chief Iwamoto (岩本室長, Iwamoto-shitsuchō): Ijiri Okada (イジリー岡田, Ijirī Okada)
- Young Geki: Keisuke Nakamura (中村 圭佑, Nakamura Keisuke)
- Young Tooya: Haruto Yoshida (吉田 晴登, Yoshida Haruto)
- Young Itsuki: Haruka Koizumi (小泉 遥香, Koizumi Haruka)
- Commander Qom (コム長官, Komu-chōkan): Toshiaki Nishizawa (西沢 利明, Nishizawa Toshiaki)
- Gavan/Retsu Ichijouji (ギャバン/一条寺 烈, Gyaban/Ichijōji Retsu): Kenji Ohba (大葉 健二, Ōba Kenji)
- Zan Vardo (ザン・バルド, Zan Barudo; Voice): Dai Matsumoto (松本 大, Matsumoto Dai)
- Lizard Doubler (リザードダブラー, Rizādo Daburā; Voice): Tomokazu Seki (関 智一, Seki Tomokazu)
- Don Horror (ドン・ホラー, Don Horā; Voice): Shōzō Iizuka (飯塚 昭三, Iizuka Shōzō)
- Narration: Kiyoshi Kobayashi (小林 清志, Kobayashi Kiyoshi)

== Theme songs ==
Main film theme

- "Uchū Keiji Gavan" (宇宙刑事ギャバン, Uchū Keiji Gyaban)
  - Lyrics: Keisuke Yamakawa (山川 啓介, Yamakawa Keisuke)
  - Composition: Michiaki Watanabe (渡辺 宙明, Watanabe Michiaki)
  - Arrangement: Kōji Makaino (馬飼野 康二, Makaino Kōji)
  - Artist: Akira Kushida

Insert song

- "Uchū Keiji Gavan -Type G-" (宇宙刑事ギャバン -Type G-, Uchū Keiji Gyaban -Taipu Jī-)
  - Lyrics: Keisuke Yamakawa
  - Composition: Michiaki Watanabe
  - Arrangement: Kohei Wada (和田 耕平, Wada Kōhei)
  - Artist: Akira Kushida
  An updated version of the original series theme. The song was also played in episode 31 of Tokumei Sentai Go-Busters.

== See also ==
- Space Sheriff Gavan
- Kaizoku Sentai Gokaiger vs. Space Sheriff Gavan: The Movie
- Kamen Rider × Super Sentai × Space Sheriff: Super Hero Taisen Z
- Space Sheriff Sharivan
- Space Sheriff Shaider
- Tokumei Sentai Go-Busters
- Metal Hero Series
