= Ricky (given name) =

Ricky is a primarily male given name in English and Spanish-speaking countries, often a diminutive form (hypocorism) of Richard, Frederick, Derrick, Roderick, Enrique, Patrick, Ricardo, Erica or Eric.

== People ==
=== Male ===
- Ricky (musician), Japanese singer and musician
- Ricky Allen (1935–2005), American blues singer
- Ricky Anderson (American football) (born 1963), American football player
- Ricky Anggawijaya (born 1996), Indonesian swimmer
- Ricky Banderas (born 1975), Puerto Rican wrestler
- Ricky Barber (born 2001), American football player
- Ricky Barham (born 1958), Australian rules football player
- Ricky Bell (disambiguation), multiple people
- Ricky Blaze (born 1988), American DJ, producer, singer, and songwriter
- Ricky Blitt, American screenwriter, producer, show creator and voice actor
- Ricky Blues, American semi-retired professional wrestler and trainer
- Ricky Bruch (1946–2011), Swedish discus thrower and Olympian athlete, actor
- Ricky Byrdsong (1956–1999), American college basketball coach and insurance executive
- Ricky Carmichael (born 1979), American car racer
- Ricky Churchman (born 1958), American football player
- Ricky Cooke (born 1969), Australian racewalker
- Ricky Council IV (born 2001), American basketball player
- Ricky Davao (1961–2025), Filipino actor and director
- Ricky Davis (born 1979), American basketball player
- Ricky Evans (darts player) (born 1990), English professional darts player
- Ricky Fataar (born 1952), South African musician, multi-instrumentalist
- Ricky Fuji (born 1965), Japanese professional wrestler
- Ricky Gervais (born 1961), English comedian, actor, writer, producer, director, singer, and musician
- Ricky Glenn (born 1989), American mixed martial artist
- Ricky Gray (1977–2017), American murderer
- Ricky Green (disambiguation), several people
- Ricky Groves (born 1968), English actor
- Ricky Harun (born 1987), Indonesian actor
- Ricky Hatton (1978–2025), English professional boxer, promoter
- Ricky Hendrick (1980–2004), American race car driver
- Ricky Hill (born 1959), English former football player, manager and head coach
- Ricky Hill (politician), American politician and banker
- Ricky Hui (1946–2011), Hong Kong film actor
- Ricky Hunter (1936–2022), Canadian professional wrestler
- Ricky Kasso (1967–1984), American killer
- Ricky Kim (born 1981), American model and actor
- Ricky Kling (born 1987), Swedish speedway rider
- Ricky Knight (born 1953), English professional wrestling trainer, promoter, owner, and former professional wrestler
- Ricky Knight Jr. (born 2000), English professional wrestler
- Ricky Lee (American football) (born 1999), American football player
- Ricky Lindo (born 2000), American-Panamanian basketball player in the Israeli Basketball Premier League
- Ricky Lumpkin (born 1988), American football player
- Ricky Martin (born 1971), Puerto Rican pop musician, actor
- Ricky Marvin (born 1980), Mexican second-generation professional wrestler
- Ricky Meléndez (born 1967), Puerto Rican singer
- Ricky Morton (born 1956), American professional wrestler
- Ricky Nelson (1940–1985), American actor, musician and singer-songwriter
- Ricky Owubokiri (born 1961), Nigerian footballer
- Ricky Pearsall (born 2000), American football player
- Ricky Peters (born 1955), American baseball player
- Ricky Person Jr. (born 1999), American football player
- Ricky Pierce (born 1959), American basketball player
- Ricky Ponting (born 1974), Australian Cricketer
- Ricky Reel (died 1997), British computer science student at Brunel University
- Ricky Reyes (born 1978), Mexican–Puerto Rican wrestler
- Ricky Rice (born 1951), American retired professional wrestler
- Ricky Rich, Swedish rapper
- Ricky Rickard (born 1958), New Zealand wrestler
- Ricky Rodriguez (1975–2005), American member of a religious cult called The Family
- Ricky Rubio (born 1990), Spanish basketball player
- Ricky Santana (born 1958), American retired professional wrestler
- Ricky Schroder (born 1970), American actor and filmmaker
- Ricky Schroeder (rugby union) (born 1991), South African former rugby union player
- Ricky Shayne (1944–2024), Egyptian-born pop singer and actor
- Ricky Van Shelton (born 1952), American country music singer
- Ricky Starks (born 1990), American professional wrestler
- Ricky Stenhouse Jr. (born 1987), American race car driver
- Ricky Stromberg (born 2000), American football player
- Ricky Tognazzi (born 1955), Italian film actor and director
- Ricky Ullman (born 1986), Israeli-American actor and musician
- Ricky Valance (1936–2020), Welsh singer
- Ricky Vaughan (born 1960), American retired professional wrestler
- Ricky Vries, Namibian politician
- Ricky Waddell (born 1981), Scottish footballer and coach
- Ricky L. Waddell (born 1959), American Army general
- Ricky Walden (born 1982), English snooker player
- Ricky Walford (born 1963), Australian rugby league footballer
- Ricky Walker (born 1996), American gridiron football player
- Ricky Warwick (born 1966), Northern Irish singer and guitarist
- Ricky Watt (born 1946), Australian rules footballer
- Ricky Watters (born 1969), American football player
- Ricky Wellard (born 1988), English footballer
- Ricky Wells (born 1991), American speedway rider
- Ricky Wesson (born 1955), American football player
- Ricky White (born 2002), American football player
- Ricky Whittle (born 1979), English actor
- Ricky Whittle (American football) (born 1971), American football player
- Ricky Wilde (born 1961), British musician
- Ricky Wilde (athlete) (1945–2019), British long-distance runner
- Ricky Williams (born 1977), American football player
- Ricky Williams (American football, born 1978) (born 1978), American football player
- Ricky Williams (musician) (1956–1992), American drummer
- Ricky Williams (darts player) (born 1989), English darts player
- Ricky Williamson (born 1962), U.S. Navy admiral
- Ricky Wilson (guitarist) (1953–1985), American guitarist
- Ricky Wilson (singer) (born 1978), English musician, painter and media personality
- Ricky Wilson (basketball) (born 1964), American basketball player
- Ricky van Wolfswinkel (born 1989), Dutch footballer
- Ricky Womack (1961–2002), American boxer
- Ricky Wong (Hong Kong businessman) (born 1961), Hong Kong telecom and media entrepreneur
- Ricky Wong (Malaysian businessman) (born 1981), Malaysian businessman
- Ricky Woods (born 1984), American basketball player
- Ricky Woodward (born 1953), American racing driver
- Ricky Wright (baseball) (born 1958), American baseball player
- Ricky Wright (rugby league) (born 1977), English rugby league footballer
- Ricky Wright (ring announcer) (born 1986), Welsh ring announcer
- Ricky Wysocki (born 1993), American disc golfer
- Ricky Yacobi (1963–2020), Indonesian footballer
- Ricky Yang (born 1972), Indonesian pool player
- Ricky P. F. Yiu (born 1957), Hong Kong horse trainer
- Ricky Young (born 1960), American boxer

=== Female ===
- Ricky Johnston (born 1943), Australian politician
- Ricky Koole (born 1972), Dutch singer and actress
- Ricky Lauren (born 1943), American author, artist, photographer, and psychotherapist
- Ricky MacMillan (born 1961), Australian equestrian
- Ricky Silberman (1937–2007), American conservative activist
- Ricky Kanee Schachter (1918–2007), Canadian dermatologist

== Fictional characters ==
- Ricky LaFleur (Trailer Park Boys character)
- Ricky Ricardo, male protagonist in the TV series I Love Lucy
- Ricky Rapper, protagonist in Finnish books and comic strips series
- Ricky Williams, from The Young and the Restless

== See also ==
- Ricky (disambiguation)
- Rickey (disambiguation)
- Rickie
- Riki (given name)
- Ricky (disambiguation)
