= Anna S. Rickey =

American poet

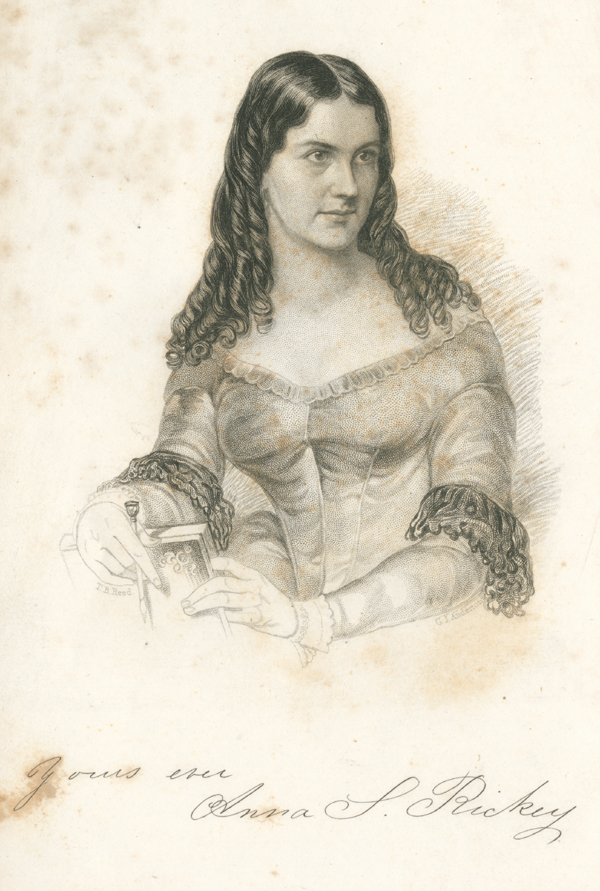
- Born: December 23, 1827; Philadelphia
- Died: August 10, 1858 (aged 30); Philadelphia
- Occupation: Writer
- Spouse(s): Solomon White Roberts

Anna Smith Rickey Roberts (December 23, 1827-August 10, 1858) was an American poet.

Anna S. Rickey was born in Philadelphia, the daughter of surveyor and architect Randal Hutchinson Rickey and his second wife, Susanna McAuley. In 1837, the family moved to Cincinnati. In 1851, she married Solomon White Roberts, vice-president of the North Pennsylvania Railroad. They had five children.

She published her poems in magazines and in 1851 published a collection of them called Forest Flowers of the West. The frontispiece was an engraving of her portrait by Thomas Buchanan Read.
