= Říčky v Orlických horách =

- Municipality
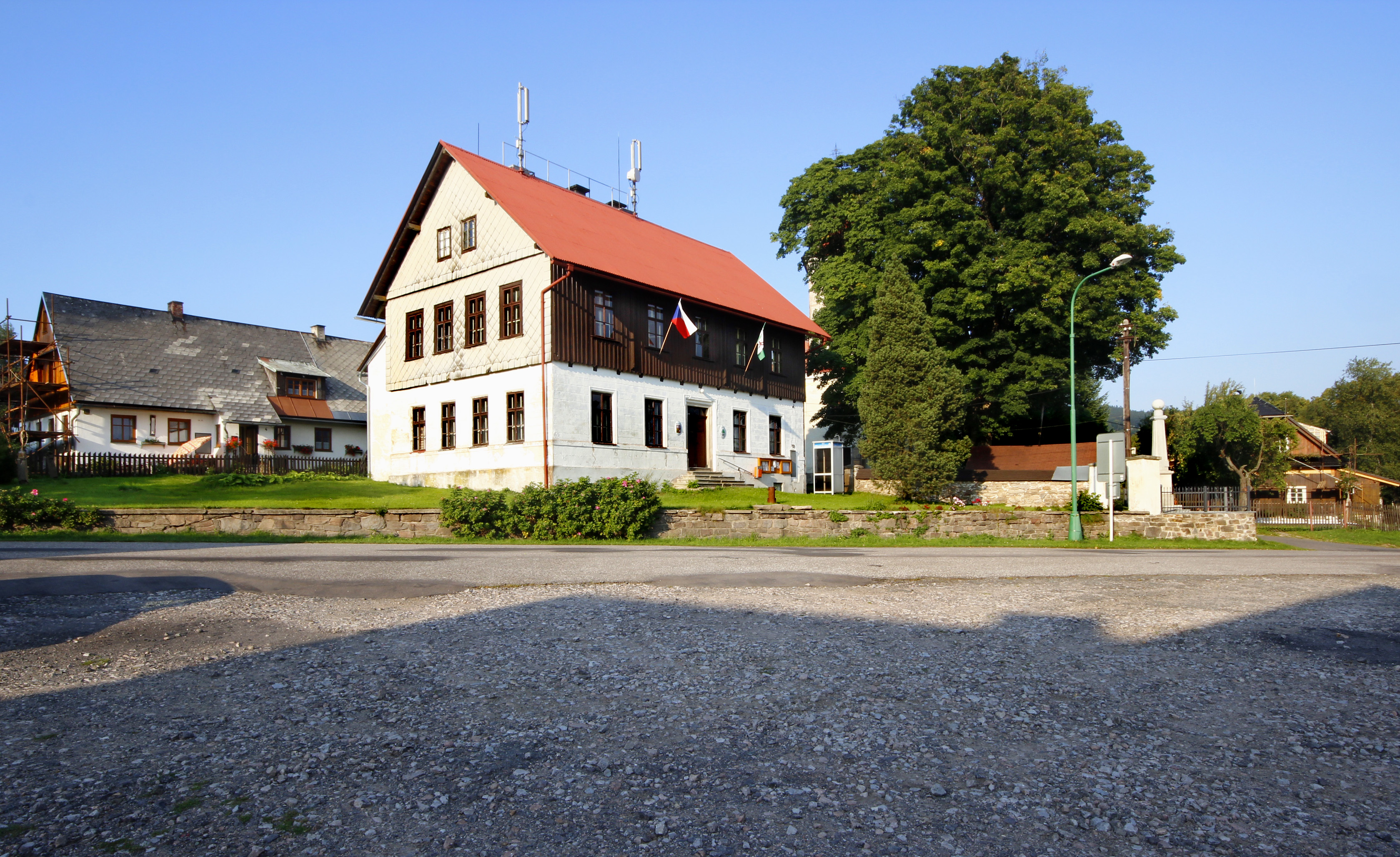
- Municipal office

- Flag Coat of arms

- Location in the Czech Republic
- Coordinates: 50°12′40″N 16°27′33″E
- Country: Czech Republic
- Region: Hradec Králové
- District: Rychnov nad Kněžnou
- First mentioned: 1654

Area
  - Total: 14.78 km^{2} (5.71 sq mi)
- Elevation: 635 m (2,083 ft)

Population (2026-01-01)
  - Total: 123
  - Density: 8.32/km^{2} (21.6/sq mi)
- Time zone: UTC+1 (CET)
  - Summer (DST): UTC+2 (CEST)
- Postal code: 517 61
- Website: www.obecricky.cz

Říčky v Orlických horách (German: Ritschka) is a municipality and village in Rychnov nad Kněžnou District in the Hradec Králové Region of the Czech Republic. It has about 100 inhabitants. It is located in the Orlické Mountains and is known for a ski area.

== Etymology ==
The name Říčky is a plural diminutive form of the Czech word řeka, so it literally means 'small rivers'. It refers to the location of the village. Until 1991, the municipality was called just Říčky. Since 1 January 1992, it has been called Říčky v Orlických horách (lit. 'small rivers in the Orlické Mountains').

== Geography ==
Říčky v Orlických horách is located about 13 kilometres (8 mi) northeast of Rychnov nad Kněžnou and 43 km (27 mi) east of Hradec Králové. It lies in the Orlické Mountains. Notable peaks in the municipal territory include Komaří vrch at 999 m (3,278 ft) above sea level and Zakletý at 991 m (3,251 ft) above sea level, but the highest point of the municipality is on the slope of the mountain U Kunštátské kaple at 1,005 m (3,297 ft) above sea level. The Říčka Stream and several of its small tributaries flow through the municipality.

== History ==
The first written mention of the village of Říčky is from 1654. However, it is documented that a settlement of lumberjacks existed here as early as the mid-16th century. After 1600, the forested area of Říčky was acquired by the Nostitz family, during whose rule many German settlers came to the area and its ethnic composition changed. From 1703, Říčky was owned by the Kolowrat family.

The village developed most in the 19th century and early 20th century. Instead of logging and agriculture, the inhabitants began to focus on glassmaking and weaving. After World War II, the German-speaking inhabitants were expelled and the municipality was resettled, especially by ethnic Slovaks who camed from Romania.

Between 1981 and 1990, Říčky was a municipal part of Rokytnice v Orlických horách. Since 1990, it has been again a separate municipality.

== Demographics ==
Historical population

Year	Pop.	±%
1869	1,155	—
1880	1,185	+2.6%
1890	1,251	+5.6%
1900	1,166	−6.8%
1910	1,107	−5.1%

Year	Pop.	±%
1921	935	−15.5%
1930	929	−0.6%
1950	126	−86.4%
1961	149	+18.3%
1970	127	−14.8%

Year	Pop.	±%
1980	113	−11.0%
1991	89	−21.2%
2001	79	−11.2%
2011	87	+10.1%
2021	102	+17.2%

Source: Censuses

== Transport ==
There are no railways or major roads passing through the municipality.

== Sport ==
Říčky v Orlických horách is known for a ski centre, located on the slope of the Zakletý mountain. It has four ski slopes, one cable car and two ski lifts.

== Sights ==
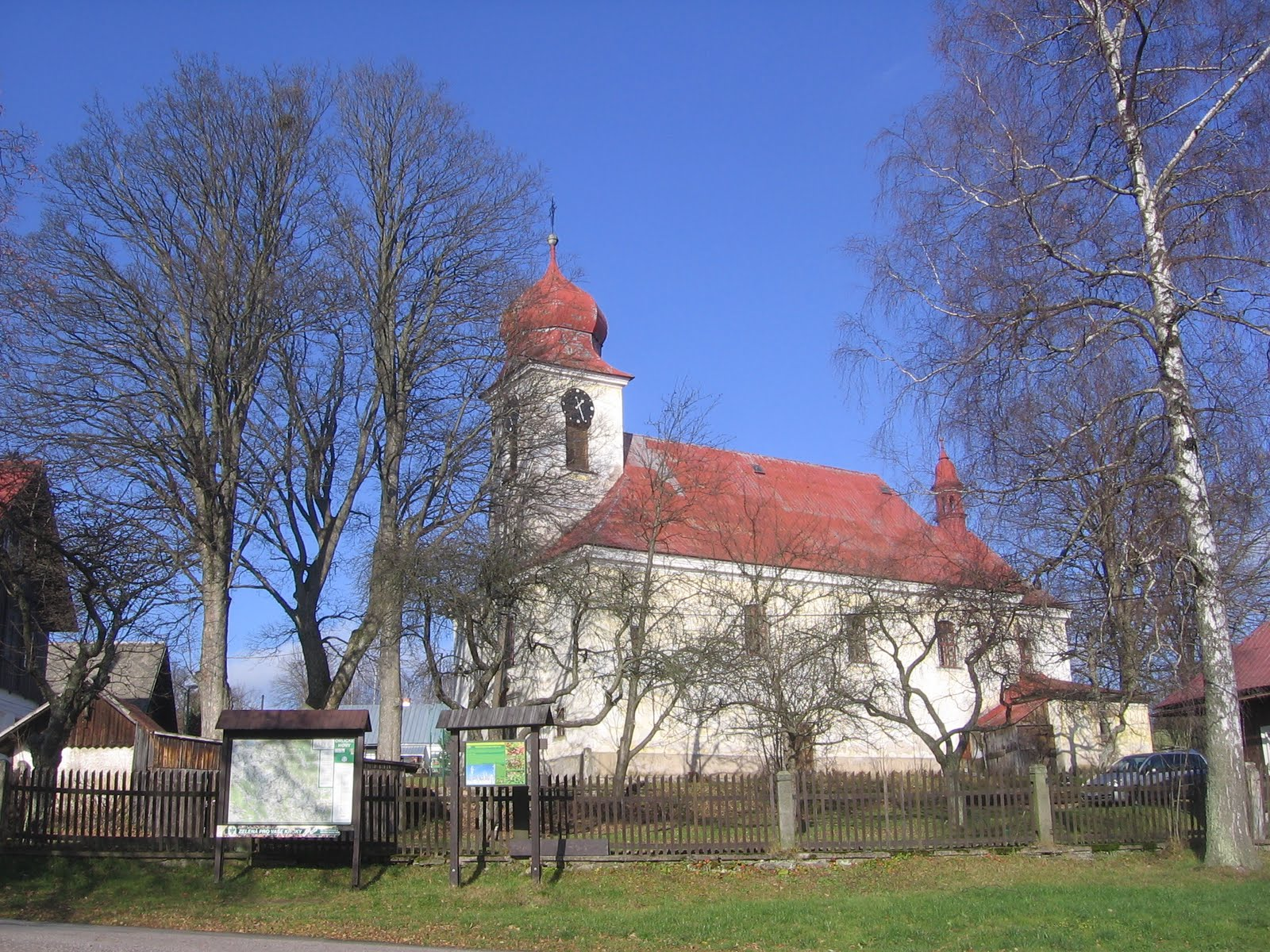
Church of the Holy Trinity

The only protected cultural monument in the municipality is a pillbox, built as part of the Czechoslovak border fortifications in 1935–1938. It is situated in the woods in the eastern part of the municipality and houses a small museum.

The main landmark of the village is the Church of the Holy Trinity, built in 1790–1792.
