= Říčky =

- Municipality
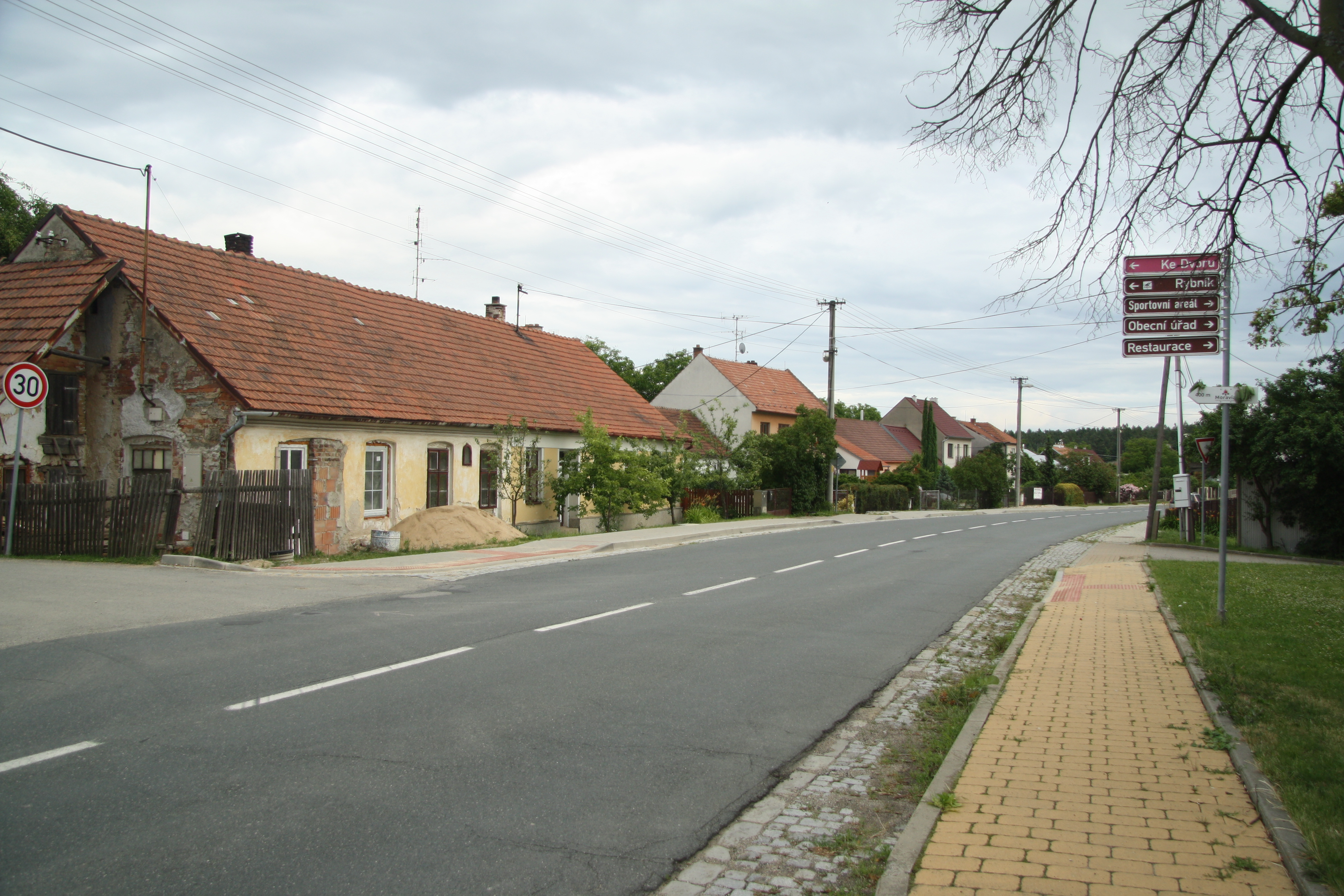
- Centre of Říčky

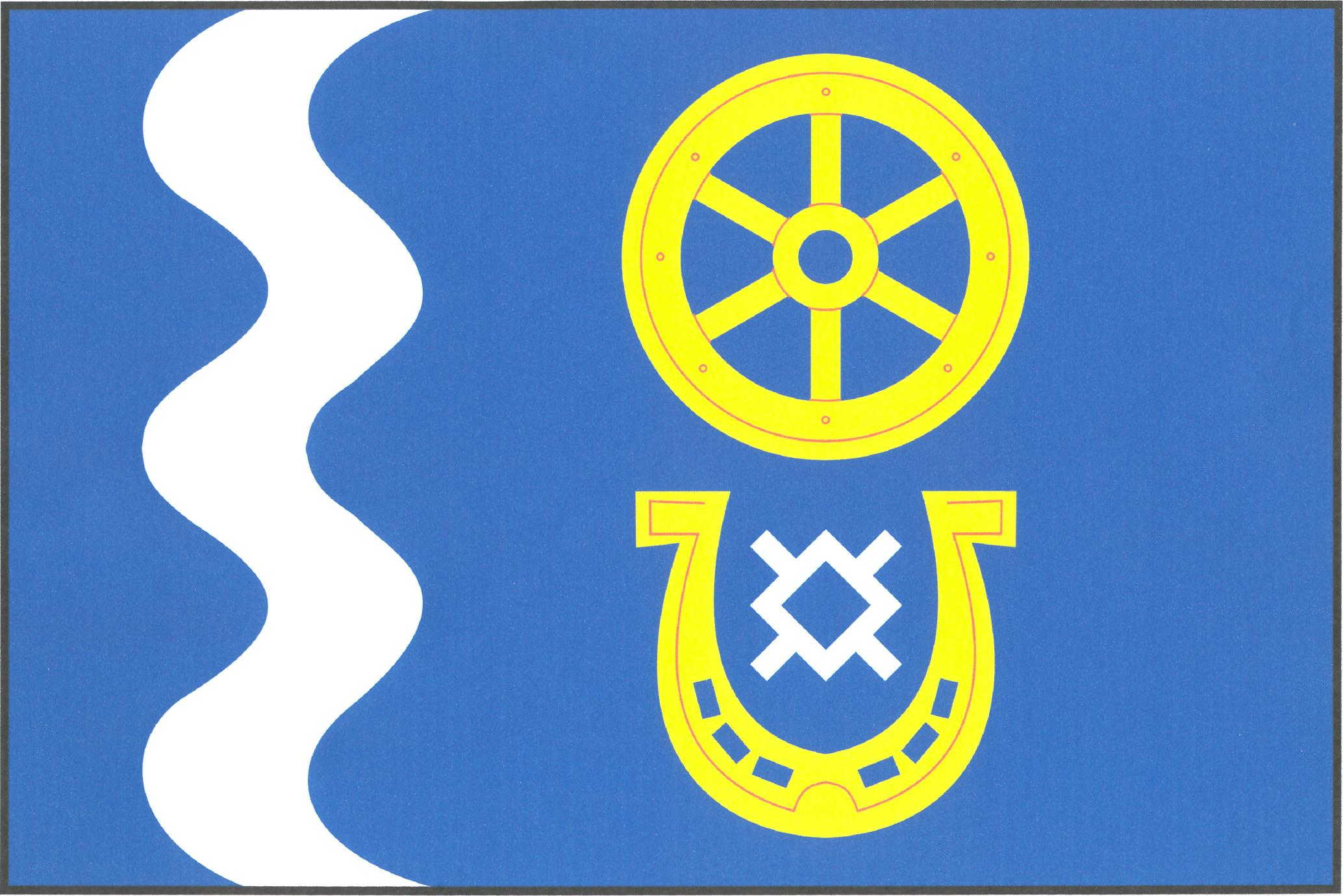
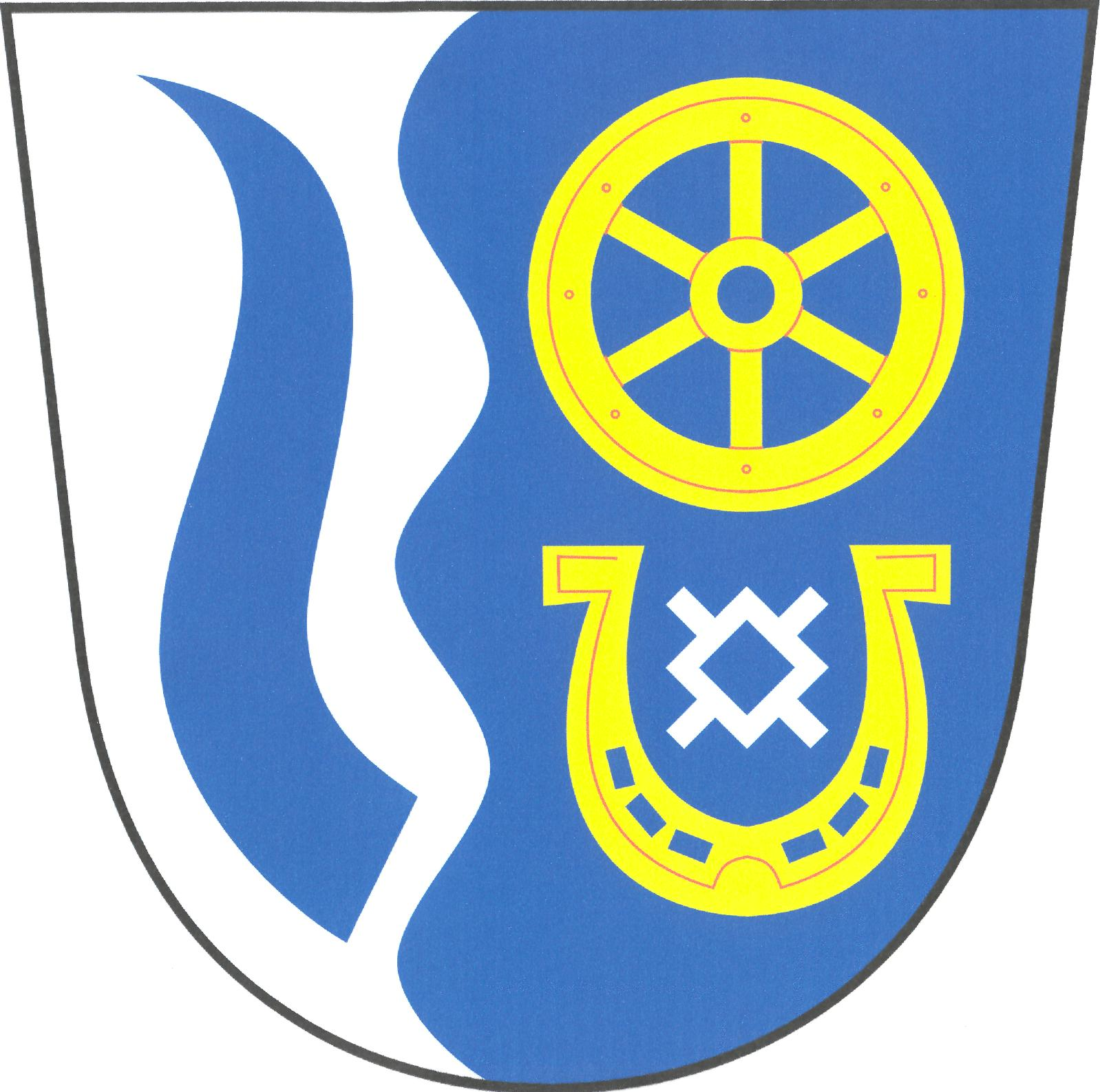
- Flag Coat of arms

- Location in the Czech Republic
- Coordinates: 49°13′59″N 16°21′21″E
- Country: Czech Republic
- Region: South Moravian
- District: Brno-Country
- First mentioned: 1358

Area
  - Total: 2.59 km^{2} (1.00 sq mi)
- Elevation: 445 m (1,460 ft)

Population (2026-01-01)
  - Total: 445
  - Density: 172/km^{2} (445/sq mi)
- Time zone: UTC+1 (CET)
  - Summer (DST): UTC+2 (CEST)
- Postal code: 664 83
- Website: www.obec-ricky.cz

Říčky is a municipality and village in Brno-Country District in the South Moravian Region of the Czech Republic. It has about 400 inhabitants.

Říčky lies approximately 20 kilometres (12 mi) west of Brno and 169 km (105 mi) south-east of Prague.

== Demographics ==
Historical population
Year	Pop.	±%
1869	226	—
1880	184	−18.6%
1890	213	+15.8%
1900	241	+13.1%
1910	253	+5.0%
1921	236	−6.7%
1930	270	+14.4%
1950	254	−5.9%
1961	277	+9.1%
1970	259	−6.5%
1980	220	−15.1%
1991	246	+11.8%
2001	247	+0.4%
2011	334	+35.2%
2021	420	+25.7%
Source: Censuses
