= Rickey =

Rickey may refer to:

== Surname or given name ==
=== Surname ===
- Anna S. Rickey (1827–1858), American poet
- Branch Rickey (1881–1965), Major League Baseball executive
- Branch Rickey Jr. (1913–1961), son of Branch, also a Major League Baseball executive
- Branch Barrett Rickey, also known as Branch Rickey III (born c. 1947), son of Branch Jr., current president of the Pacific Coast League
- George Rickey (1907–2002), American kinetic sculptor
- V. Frederick Rickey (born 1941), American mathematician and historian of mathematics

=== Given name ===
- Rickey Hatley (born 1994), American football player
- Rickey Henderson (1958–2024), American Major League Baseball outfielder who is baseball's all-time leader in stolen bases and runs scored
- Rickey Hill (born 1956), American baseball player
- Rickey Hill (cheerleader) (died 2021), American cheerleading coach
- Rickey Medlocke (born 1950), lead guitarist of Blackfoot and Lynyrd Skynyrd
- Rickey Skinger (born 1949), American ski racer

== Other uses ==
- Rickey (cocktail), a family of cocktails

== See also ==
- Ricky (disambiguation)
