= Rikke =

Rikke is a female given name. Notable people with this name include:

- Rikke Broen (born 1972), Danish badminton player
- Rikke Dybdahl (born 1997), Danish football player
- Rikke Emma Niebuhr, Danish singer
- Rikke Granlund (born 1989), Norwegian handball player
- Rikke Helms (born 1948), Danish cultural worker
- Rikke Holm (born 1972), Danish footballer
- Rikke Hørlykke (born 1976), Danish handball player
- Rikke Hvilshøj (born 1970), Danish politician
- Rikke Ibsen (born 1990), Danish sport shooter
- Rikke Iversen (born 1993), Danish handball player
- Rikke Iversen (curler) (born 1998) Norwegian wheelchair curler
- Rikke Karlsson (born 1965), Danish politician
- Rikke Kornvig (born 1983), Danish mountain bike orienteer
- Rikke Lind (born 1968), Norwegian politician
- Rikke Madsen (born 1997), Danish footballer
- Rikke Møller Pedersen (born 1989), Danish swimmer
- Rikke Nielsen (born 1977), Danish handball player
- Rikke Nissen (1834–1892), Norwegian nursing teacher
- Rikke Nygard (born 2000), Norwegian footballer
- Rikke Olsen (born 1975), Danish badminton player
- Rikke Øyerhamn (born 2000), Norwegian handball player
- Rikke Petersen-Schmidt (born 1975), Danish handball player
- Rikke Poulsen (born 1986), Danish handball player
- Rikke Raben (born 1965), Danish sculptor and medallist
- Rikke Rønholt (born 1976), Danish athlete
- Rikke Schubart (born 1966), Danish author & scholar
- Rikke Sevecke (born 1996), Danish football player
- Rikke Skov (born 1980), Danish handball player
- Rikke Solberg (born 1971), Danish handball player
- Rikke Søby Hansen (born 1995), Danish badminton player
- Rikke Svane, Danish equestrian
- Rikke Zachariassen (born 1984), Danish handball player

== See also ==
- Rikki (name)
