= Ricky's Sports Theatre and Grill =

- Interactive map of Ricky's Sports Theatre and Grill

Restaurant information
- Established: 1946
- Food type: Sports bar
- Dress code: Casual
- Location: 15028 Hesperian Boulevard, San Leandro, California, 94578, United States
- Coordinates: 37.70428°N 122.129291°W
- Website: rickeyssportslounge.com

Ricky's Sports Theatre and Grill is a Las Vegas Raiders-themed sports bar located in San Leandro, California.

Ricky's opened in 1946 as a steakhouse and became famous for being rated the number two best sports bar in America according to Sports Illustrated and the number two best sports bar in America according to CNN.

In July 2018, Raiders head coach Jon Gruden held a fan appreciation event at Ricky's that was attended by over 500 fans and featured Raiders general manager Reggie McKenzie, Raiders team owner Mark Davis and several Raiders legends.

Ricky's owner Ricky Ricardo died in November 2020 at the age of 75 and the restaurant had been closed for months due to the COVID-19 pandemic. A GoFundMe crowdfunding campaign was launched in 2020 to save Ricky's.

The original Ricky's was opened by John Ricardo Sr. in 1946 and moved to San Leandro, California in 1960.

== Reopening ==
Ricky's reopened in May 2023 under the name Rickey’s Sports Lounge with new owner Ramonn Smith.
