= Ricki Thomas =

Author

Ricki Thomas is an author of crime fiction. Her works include Deadly Angels (2015), Rings of Death (2014), Black Park (2013), Bonfire Night (2013), Bloody Mary (2011), Unlikely Killer (2010) and Hope's Vengeance (2009). She has also contributed to various anthologies, including Guilty Parties by members of the Crime Writers Association, published by Severn House (2014), Wild Wolf's Twisted Tails (2013) and the award-winning Holiday of the Dead (2011). She first enjoyed commercial success with Unlikely Killer, which became the 29th best-selling e-book of 2011 worldwide.

Ricki has four children and has travelled extensively, but now enjoys a peaceful life in Yorkshire.

== Awards and achievements ==
Top 50 e-books of 2011 for Unlikely Killer - https://web.archive.org/web/20130703013302/http://futurebook.net/content/top-50-e-book-bestsellers-year

Best Horror Anthology of 2011 Award for Holiday of the Dead - http://www.thisishorror.co.uk/features/this-is-horror-awards-2011-the-winners/anthology-of-the-year/
