= Rickie =

Rickie is a male or female given name.

== People ==
- Rickie Collins (born 2005), American football player
- Rickie Fowler (born 1988), American professional golfer
- Rickie Harris (born 1943), American football defensive back
- Rickie Haywood-Williams (born 1980), English radio DJ and television presenter
- Rickie Lee Jones (born 1954), American vocalist, musician, songwriter, and producer
- Rickie Lambert (born 1982), English professional footballer
- Rickie Lloyd (born 1970), Italian-American event planner
- Rickie D. Moore, noted theologian within the Pentecostal movement
- Rickie Solinger (born 1947), independent historian, curator, and lecturer
- Rickie Tice, American songwriter
- Rickie Weeks Jr. (born 1982), American professional baseball left fielder
- Rickie Winslow (born 1964), retired American professional basketball player

== See also ==
- Ricky (disambiguation)
- Rikki
