= Andy Foster (sports commissioner) =

American sportsman & administrator (born 1979)

- Born: January 13, 1979 (age 47); Dalton, Georgia, U.S.

Andy Foster (born January 13, 1979) is the current executive director of the California State Athletic Commission (2012–present) and former Georgia Athletic and Entertainment Commission (2008–2012) and former professional mixed martial artist.

Foster is married to his wife Sonja and they have one son.

== Combative sports career ==
In his capacity as a mixed martial artist, Foster has achieved the following notable accomplishments: BodogFight Series III Costa Rica Combat winner (2007), International Sport Combat Federation (ISCF ) Middleweight Southeast Champion (April 2004) and ISCF Light Heavyweight East Coast Amateur Champion (October 2003). Foster has fought in combative sports since 1997.

Andy Foster is an experienced multi-disciplined fighter who Has trained in Jiu-Jitsu, Taekwondo, Aikido, Judo, Hapkido, Muay Thai, Jeet Kune Do, Sambo, Kickboxing, and Boxing. Foster holds a MMA record of 17 – 2 (8–0 Amateur and 9–2 Professional – Pro- 2 KOs, 7 Submissions, 1 TKO, 1 Decision). He has a 23–3 Amateur Boxing Record; 77–4–2 Amateur Submission Wrestling/Jiu-Jitsu Record; and 1–2 Amateur Kickboxing Record.

In addition to being a successful fighter, Foster has promoted five professional MMA cards; four professional Boxing matches, matchmaker of nine professional MMA cards, trained over 30 successful MMA fighters, refereed over 500 MMA bouts, Brazilian Jiu-Jitsu Instructor (2003–2007), served as Head Referee for the Georgia Athletic and Entertainment Commission (2007–2008), instructed several referee and judge training course on behalf of the Georgia Athletic and Entertainment Commission, and judged over 100 MMA bouts.

== Regulator ==
In 2008, Foster was appointed by then Georgia Secretary of State Karen Handel as executive director of the Georgia Athletic and Entertainment Commission (2008–present) where he was responsible for carrying out the policies of the five-member Athletic and Entertainment Commission, which is charged with licensing and regulating the professional boxing, kickboxing, mixed martial arts, and wrestling contests throughout the U.S. state of Georgia. The executive director is also responsible for regulating the State of Georgia's Ticket Broker Laws. In 2010, the new Secretary of State Brian Kemp kept Foster as the executive director.

In this capacity as executive director, Foster monitors the medical review program; develops and presents medical review program changes and/or modifications to the commission for approval; reports results of medical reviews in applicable national databases; directs drug testing program for participants and maintains confidential reports and related documents.

Foster coordinates fiscal, management, and staff functions with appropriate departmental staff; reviews, modifies, and approves program budget proposals; establishes fiscal controls to assure that expenditures do not exceed budgeted funds and are in conformance with approved fiscal programs; supervises the regulatory activities of the Commission staff and each event.

Foster directs the analysis of legislative proposals that affect the commission's program; recommends modification of proposed legislation to align with Commission policy, programs, or procedures; identifies the need for new legislation and, under Commission direction, acts to support or oppose such legislation; represents the commission before the Georgia State Legislature.

Foster oversees the education and licensure of licensees of the commission; consults with the commission to identify issues that warrant attention and involvement; recommends changes in Commission policy; implements and maintains overall policy established by the commission.

Makes final decisions regarding the application of Commission laws and regulations relative to licensing; monitors the licensing program; issues licenses in accordance with policies, rules and regulations established by the commission; develops and presents licensing program changes and/or modifications to the commission for approval; takes punitive action against licensees when situations warrant in accordance with policies established by the commission; confers with attorneys and administrators on problems regarding policy decisions and legal opinions.

Foster follows up on Commission motions and resolutions to ensure completed staff work; assigns work priorities and establishes deadlines and check points for completion; evaluates job performance of any administrative staff.

Foster assigns officials to all professional boxing, kickboxing and mixed martial arts events; conducts post show audits and makes reports; evaluates referees and judges; acts as Commission's liaison with the legislature, voluntary and professional associations, other governmental agencies, and the public.

== Association memberships ==
Foster represents the Georgia Athletic and Entertainment Commission as a member of the Association of Boxing Commissions. Foster is a member of the Unified Rules Committee of Matchmaking of Mixed Martial Arts (2008–present); Association of Boxing Commissions Member of the Unified Rules Committee to review Unified Rules (2008–Present) and Association of Boxing Commissions Chairman of the Amateur Unified Rules Committee.

== Serving US military as a regulator ==
In September 2009, Foster traveled to Mosul, Iraq with Devil Dog Entertainment and Armed Formed Entertainment to serve as the Head Regulator for the first MMA event within enemy territory. The event “Fight Night For Heroes” was officially sanctioned by the ISCF, International Sport Combat Federation and took place on a military base in a warzone and featured 17 fights involving mainly of active duty military.

On October 2, 2009, Foster was featured by the Atlanta Business Chronicle in an article entitle “Fighter-turned-regulator oversees licensing agency” under the People in the News section.

== Awards and recognition ==
Foster has received the 2008 Georgia Boxing Official of the Year by the Georgia Championship Boxing Committee; the 2008 Georgia Championship Boxing Committee Commissioner of the year; the 2009 Georgia Fighters Critics Pick Commissioner of the Year; the Georgia Fighters Fans Pick Commissioner of the Year. Foster was also inducted into the Georgia Fighters Mixed Martial Arts Hall of Fame.

== Mixed martial arts record ==
Professional record breakdown
11 matches	9 wins	2 losses
By knockout	2	1
By submission	7	0
By decision	0	1

Res.	Record	Opponent	Method	Event	Date	Round	Time	Location	Notes
Loss	9–2	Amar Suloev	KO (punches)	Bodog Fight - Clash of the Nations	April 14, 2007	1	0:26	St. Petersburg, Russia	
Win	9–1	Grzegorz Jakubowski	TKO (punches)	Bodog Fight - Costa Rica Combat	February 17, 2007	3	2:14	Costa Rica	
Win	8–1	Fritz Paul	TKO (cut)	Ultimate Generation Combat 13	May 25, 2006	3	0:00	Quebec, Canada	
Loss	7–1	Brian Ebersole	Decision (unanimous)	Full Throttle 6	February 11, 2006	3	5:00	Atlanta, Georgia, United States	
Win	7–0	Trevor Garrett	Submission (armbar)	Full Throttle 5	November 4, 2005	1	2:22	Duluth, Georgia, United States	
Win	6–0	Wayne Music	Submission (armbar)	Full Throttle 4	September 9, 2005	1	1:19	Duluth, Georgia, United States	
Win	5–0	Wayne Music	Submission (rear-naked choke)	ISCF Summer Heat 2005	June 18, 2005	1	1:14	Valdosta, Georgia, United States	
Win	4–0	Mat Santos	Submission (rear-naked choke)	Full Throttle 2	June 3, 2005	1	2:49	Atlanta, Georgia, United States	
Win	3–0	Lionel Cortez	Submission (armbar)	ISCF - Compound Fracture 2	February 4, 2005	1	0:28	Atlanta, Georgia, United States	
Win	2–0	Jason Hathaway	Submission (armbar)	ISCF - Holiday Havoc	December 10, 2004	1	N/A	Valdosta, Georgia, United States	
Win	1–0	David Davis	Submission (armbar)	ISCF - Anarchy in August 2	August 7, 2004	1	0:24	Atlanta, Georgia, United States	
