= Riki Kumeta =

Japanese karateka

- Born: 9 March 1983; Kyoto Prefecture, Japan
- Style: Shotokan Karate
- Teacher(s): Masaaki Ueki
- Rank: 3rd Dan karate (JKA)

Riki Kumeta (Kumeta Riki, born 9 March 1983) is a Japanese instructor of Shotokan karate.

He is currently an instructor of the Japan Karate Association.

== Biography ==
Riki Kumeta was born in Kyoto Prefecture, Japan on ch 9 March 1983. He studied at Kokushikan University.

== Competition ==
Riki Kumeta has had considerable success in karate competition.

=== Major Tournament Success ===
- 54th JKA All Japan Karate Championship (2011) - 2nd Place Kumite
- 53rd JKA All Japan Karate Championship (2010) - 3rd Place Kumite
- 52nd JKA All Japan Karate Championship (2009) - 2nd Place Kumite
- 51st JKA All Japan Karate Championship (2008) - 3rd Place Kata
