= Ricky (band) =

English indie rock band

Ricky was an English indie rock band.

== Career ==
Ricky formed in Portsmouth, England in the autumn of 2000. The band's first release was a self-funded mini-album, released in January 2002, titled You Set The Scene, named after the last track on Forever Changes, an album by Love.

Between 2004 and 2006, they had a number of small chart hits on the Garcia and Beat Crazy record labels, including a Top 40 hit in January 2005 with "Stop Knocking The Walls Down". This song was a double-A sided single, backed with "The Journey" by Ian Prowse's band Amsterdam and would give Ricky their only week in the Top 40.

In 2006, they released "We Are England", a football song, which reached number 54 in the UK pop chart; later in 2006 Ricky disbanded.

== Discography ==
=== Albums ===
- You Set the Scene (January 2002)
- The Summer Sun Still Echoes (March 2004), re-released (October 2004)
- 'High Speed Silence' (recorded but unreleased – although promotional CD's do exist)

=== Singles ===
- "Sunset View" (March 2003)
- "That Extra Mile" / "Beat Out the Best in Me" (September 2004) – #50 UK; #10 UK Indie
- "Stop Knocking The Walls Down" (January 2005 – split single with Amsterdam) – #32 UK; #8 UK Indie
- "We Are England" (June 2006) – #54 UK; #3 UK Indie
