= Riki Miura =

Japanese actor

- Born: October 17, 1983 (age 42); Hiroshima Prefecture, Japan
- Occupation: Actor
- Years active: 2005-2018
- Height: 180 cm (5 ft 11 in)
- Website: http://www.stardust.co.jp/talent/336.html Stardust Promotion, inc. profile

Riki Miura (三浦 力, Miura Riki; born October 17, 1983) is a Japanese actor from Hiroshima Prefecture. Miura made his acting debut in 2005. His first major role has been as Gou Fukami/Geki Violet in Juken Sentai Gekiranger. He announced on March 10, 2018 that he will retire from the entertainment business on March 31, 2018.

== Filmography ==
=== Television ===
- Juken Sentai Gekiranger as Gou Fukami/Geki Violet (2007)
- Here Is Greenwood as Mitsuru Ikeda (2008)
- Saba Doru as Takeo Tabata (2012)
- Mō Ichido Kimi ni, Propose as Riki Mita (2012)
- Tsuribaka Nisshi: Shin'nyū Shain Hamasaki Densuke as Satoshi Iwami (2015)

=== Films ===
- Juken Sentai Gekiranger vs Boukenger as Gou Fukami/Geki Violet (2007)
- Engine Sentai Go-onger vs. Gekiranger as Gou Fukami/Geki Violet (2008)
- Battle of Demons as Kuniichi Mitsugi (2009)
- Yellow Kid as Hashimoto (2010)
- Natural Woman (2010)
- Futari Ecchi as Makoto Onoda (2011)
- Space Sheriff Gavan: The Movie as Kai Hyuga/Space Sheriff Sharivan (2012)
- Kamen Rider × Super Sentai × Space Sheriff: Super Hero Taisen Z as Kai Hyuga/Space Sheriff Sharivan (2013)
- Ryusei as Kazuki (2013)
- Crows Explode (2014)
- Space Sheriffs: Next Generation as Kai Hyuga/Space Sheriff Sharivan (2014)
