= Rikki =

- Gender: Unisex

Origin
- Origin: Various
- Region of origin: Various

Other names
- Variant form: Rikkie
- Related names: Riki, Ricky

Rikki, alternatively spelled Rikkie, is a given name of feminine and masculine usage.

== Rikki ==
- Rikki (Japanese singer) (born 1975), Japanese folk singer
- Rikki (British singer), Scottish pop singer
- Rikki Bains (born 1988), English footballer
- Rikki Beadle-Blair (born 1961), British actor, director, screenwriter, and playwright
- Rikki Chamberlain (born 1973), British actor
- Rikki Clarke (born 1981), English cricketer
- Rikki Ducornet (born 1943), American writer, poet, and artist
- Rikki Ferguson (born 1956), Scottish professional footballer
- Rikki Fifton (born 1985), British sprinter
- Rikki Fleming (born 1946), Scottish footballer
- Rikki Fulton (1924–2004), Scottish comedian and actor
- Rikki Jai, Trinidadian chutney-soca artiste
- Rikki Klieman (born 1948), American criminal defense lawyer and television personality
- Rikki Mathay, broadcast journalist from the Philippines
- Rikki Neave (1988–1994), English male murder victim
- Rikki Poynter (born 1991), deaf American YouTuber and activist
- Rikki Rockett (born 1961), American glam metal drummer
- Rikki Sheriffe (born 1984), English rugby league player
- Rikki Wemega-Kwawu, Ghanaian artist
- Rikki Condren (born 1965), American musician, producer, composer

== Rikkie ==
- Rikkie Kollé (born 2001), Dutch model
- Rikkie-Lee Tyrrell, Australian politician

== Fictional characters ==
- Rikki Barnes, a Marvel Comics character
- Rikki Chadwick, a character from Australian television series H_{2}O: Just Add Water and supporting character in its spin-off Mako: Island of Secrets
- Rikki-Tikki-Tavi, a character in the eponymous story in The Jungle Book

== See also ==
- King Rikki, 2002 drama film
- Ricky (disambiguation)
- Riki
- Rikki & Daz, pop music duo
