= Senator Gordon =

Senator Gordon may refer to:

== Members of the Northern Irish Senate ==
- Alexander Gordon (Northern Ireland politician) (1882–1967), Northern Irish Senator from 1950 to 1964

== Members of the Philippine Senate ==
- Richard J. Gordon (born 1945), Philippine Senator from 2004 to 2010 and since 2016

== Members of the United States Senate ==
- James Gordon (Mississippi politician) (1833–1912), U.S. Senator from Mississippi from 1909 to 1910
- John Brown Gordon (1832–1904), U.S. Senator from Georgia from 1873 to 1880

== United States state senate members ==
- Bernard G. Gordon (1916–1978), New York State Senate
- Francis Gordon (1928–2013), Kansas State Senate
- Edward F. Gordon (1904-1975), Kansas State Senate
- George Anderson Gordon (1830–1872), Georgia State Senate
- Harry L. Gordon (1860–1921), Kansas State Senate
- Jack Gordon (Mississippi politician) (1944–2011), Mississippi State Senate
- Jack D. Gordon (1922–2005), Florida State Senate
- James Wright Gordon (1809–1853), Michigan State Senate
- James Gordon (New York politician) (1739–1810), New York State Senate
- Janet Hill Gordon (1915–1990), New York State Senate
- Jeff Gordon (politician) (born 1967), Connecticut State Senate
- Ned Gordon (born 1948), New Hampshire State Senate
- Powhatan Gordon (1802–1879), Tennessee State Senate
- Randy Gordon (politician) (born 1953), Washington State Senate
- Robert M. Gordon (politician) (born 1950), New Jersey State Senate
- William Washington Gordon (1796–1842), Georgia State Senate
- William Gordon (New Hampshire politician) (1763–1802), New Hampshire State Senate
