= Marye (horse) =

American warhorse

- Species: Horse
- Sex: Mare
- Died: July 9, 1864
- Occupation: warhorse
- Employer: United States Army; Confederate States Army

Marye was a warhorse owned by the United States Army during the American Civil War who was later captured and pressed into Confederate States service.

== Early life and career ==
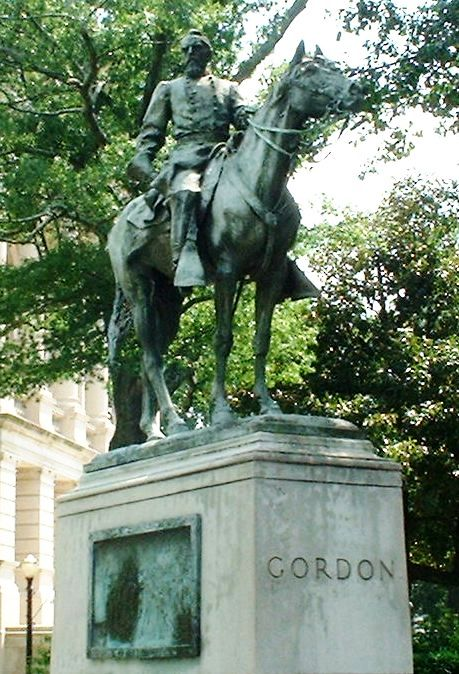
A statue of Marye, with John Brown Gordon atop, sits on the grounds of the Georgia capitol.

=== United States military service ===
Marye's early life and original name and master are unknown. She fought with United States forces during the American Civil War at the Battle of Fredericksburg in 1862. During the assault against fortified Confederate positions at Marye's Heights, the beast's rider was shot off her and the animal galloped into the Confederate lines. The brigade of Georgia troops of the Army of Northern Virginia captured the steed and brought her to their commander, General John Brown Gordon, whose own mount had just succumbed to exhaustion. At the conclusion of active combat, the horse was surrendered to the Quartermaster but purchased back by the Georgia soldiers and presented to Gordon as a trophy.

=== Confederate States military service ===
Gordon named the horse Marye in tribute to the location of its capture and is said to have treasured the horse since it was a gift from his men. Gordon used the horse as a mount until 1864 when she was killed in action by gunfire at the Battle of Monocacy.

== Characteristics ==
According to Gordon's description of the horse, she was generally sluggish, however, during battle was "transformed" into an excellent warhorse with a fearless character who would "with its head up and its nostrils distended, bound across ditches and over fences". Gordon would tribute Marye as "the most superb battlehorse that it was my fortune to mount during the war".

== Legacy ==
In 1907 a statue of Gordon atop Marye, by Solon Borglum, was unveiled on the grounds of the Georgia State Capitol.

== See also ==
- United States Cavalry
