= Edward Gordon =

Edward or Ed Gordon may refer to:

== Politics ==
- Edward Gordon, Baron Gordon of Drumearn (1814–1879), Scottish judge and politician
- Edward Gordon (New Zealand politician) (1885–1964), New Zealand politician
- Edward F. Gordon (politician, born 1904) (1904–1975), American politician, Kansas state legislator
- Francis Gordon (politician) (Edward Francis Gordon, 1928–2013), American politician, Kansas state legislator, son of the above
- Ned Gordon (Edward Gordon, born 1948), American politician, New Hampshire state legislator

== Sport ==
- Ed Gordon (long jumper) (1908–1971), American long jumper and high jumper
- Edward Gordon (bowls) (1912–1992), Irish lawn bowler

== Others ==
- Edward R. Gordon (1886–1938), American director and actor, see Water Rustlers
- Ted Gordon (1941–2023), U.S. Navy rear admiral
- Laraaji (Edward Larry Gordon, born 1943), American musician
- Ed Gordon (journalist) (born 1960), American television journalist

== See also ==
- Eddie Gordon (disambiguation)
- Eduardo Gordon (disambiguation)
