= Capital of Georgia =

Capital of Georgia may refer to:

- In country of Georgia:
  - Tbilisi, present capital
  - Kutaisi, historical capital of the Kingdom of Georgia and former legislative capital
- In U.S. state of Georgia:
  - Atlanta, present capital
  - Savannah, Georgia, capital of the Province of Georgia, one of the Thirteen Colonies of British America
  - The Georgia State Capitol building
