= Gerald Gordon (politician) =

American politician

Member of the Kansas House of Representatives from the 1st district
- In office January 14, 1935 – January 9, 1939
- Preceded by: Louis Strong
- Succeeded by: C.I. Moyer

Personal details
- Born: September 29, 1895 Highland, Kansas, US
- Died: November 24, 1959 (aged 64) Topeka, Kansas, US
- Party: Republican
- Spouse: Grace Gordon
- Relations: Edward F. Gordon (brother); Francis Gordon (nephew)

Gerald Gordon (September 29, 1895 – November 24, 1959) was an American politician who was a member of the Kansas House of Representatives from 1935 to 1939.

Gordon was born in Highland, Kansas in 1895. He worked as a farmer and stockman while in the legislature. He was originally elected to the State House in 1934, serving from 1935 to 1939; the seat would later pass to his brother, Edward F. Gordon, in 1955. After being re-elected in 1936, Gerald Gordon was succeeded in the legislature by C.I. Moyer for the term beginning in 1939.
