= Arthur Fenton =

Arthur Fenton may refer to:

- Arthur Fenton (Australian politician) (1882–1962)
- Arthur Fenton (cricketer) (1870–1950), Australian cricketer
- Arthur W. Fenton, member of the Kansas House of Representatives

== See also ==
- Fenton (name)
