= Edward Pugh =

Edward Pugh may refer to:

- Edward Pugh (bishop) (1909–1986), English Church of England bishop
- Edward Pugh (artist) (1763–1813), Welsh artist
- Edward Pugh (author) (c.1760s–1820s), pen name David Hughson, writer on the topography and history of London
- Edward W. Pugh (born 1949), American politician, member of the Kansas State Legislature
- Teddy Pugh (1878–1958), Welsh gymnast
