= Jack Euler =

American politician

Member of the Kansas House of Representatives from the 1st district
- In office January 14, 1963 – January 9, 1967
- Preceded by: Lewis Hazen
- Succeeded by: Bill Fribley

Member of the Kansas House of Representatives from the 52nd district
- In office January 9, 1967 – January 8, 1973
- Succeeded by: Wallace Buck

Personal details
- Born: April 1, 1929 Wathena, KS
- Died: December 31, 2015 (aged 86)
- Party: Republican
- Spouse: Phyllis Euler

Jack Richard Euler (April 1, 1929 – December 31, 2015) was a lawyer and politician who was a member of the Kansas House of Representatives.

Euler was born in Wathena, Kansas, graduating from Washburn University's School of Law in 1953. He spent time in the U.S. Army during the 1950s, and upon his discharge in 1956 began practicing law in Troy, Kansas.

Euler won election to the Kansas House in the 1962 elections, serving from 1963 to 1973. He chaired the House Judiciary Committee for eight years.
