= Leroy Brunson =

American politician

Member of the Kansas House of Representatives from the 1st district
- In office 1970 – January 11, 1971
- Preceded by: Bill Fribley
- Succeeded by: Fred Weaver

Personal details
- Born: July 6, 1904
- Died: April 27, 1983 (aged 78)
- Party: Republican

Leroy Brunson (July 6, 1904 — April 27, 1983) was a member of the Kansas House of Representatives, serving as a short-term replacement to finish out the term of Bill Fribley, who resigned his seat mid-term. Brunson served in the seat during 1970, and was succeeded by Fred Weaver.
