= Fred Weaver =

American politician

Member of the Kansas House of Representatives from the 1st district
- In office January 11, 1971 – 1983
- Preceded by: Leroy Brunson
- Succeeded by: Pat Weaver

Personal details
- Born: June 19, 1929 Quapaw, Oklahoma
- Died: March 23, 2006 (aged 76) Baxter Springs, Kansas
- Party: Democratic
- Spouse: Pat Weaver
- Children: 5 (3 sons, 2 daughters)

Fred Leo Weaver (June 19, 1929-March 23, 2006) was an American politician who served as a member of the Kansas House of Representatives from 1971 to 1983. Born in Quapaw, Oklahoma, Weaver married Patricia Weaver (née Gardner) in 1950 in Baxter Springs, Kansas, where he would spend most of his life.

Weaver worked as a farmer in southeastern Kansas, and also ran a construction company. He was elected to the Kansas House of Representatives in the 1970 elections, serving from 1971 to 1983. During his time in the legislature, he was elected leader of the Democratic caucus. In 1983, Weaver resigned from the legislature after accepting an appointment to the Kansas State Board of Tax Appeals from Governor John W. Carlin; Weaver's wife Pat replaced him in the legislature. Fred Weaver served for on the tax board for six years. He died in 2006.
