= Don Sallee =

American politician (1933–2019)

Member of the Kansas Senate from the 1st district
- In office 1989–1997
- Preceded by: Francis Gordon
- Succeeded by: Edward Pugh

Member of the Kansas House of Representatives from the 49th district
- In office 1983–1989
- Preceded by: Francis Gordon

Personal details
- Born: March 17, 1933 Troy, Kansas
- Died: August 27, 2019 Troy, Kansas
- Party: Republican
- Spouse: Jean Thornton
- Children: 2

Don Sallee (March 17, 1933 – August 27, 2019) is an American former politician and attorney from Kansas who served as a member of both the Kansas House of Representatives and the Kansas Senate.

Sallee was born in Troy, Kansas. He served in the U.S. Army during the Korean War, after which he returned to Kansas, where he farmed and worked as an electrician.

In 1982, Sallee was elected to the Kansas House of Representatives, where he served 3 terms from 1983 to 1988. He was then elected to the Kansas State Senate in 1988 and re-elected in 1992 and 1996; in 1997, he resigned his seat to serve as a magistrate judge for Doniphan County. He retired from his judgeship in 1999 and founded a computer sales and service company. Sallee died at his home in 2019.
