= John E. Chandler =

American politician

Member of the Kansas Senate from the 1st district
- In office 1977 – October 15, 1982
- Succeeded by: Francis Gordon

Personal details
- Born: July 13, 1915 Topeka, Kansas, US
- Died: October 15, 1982 Holton, Kansas, US
- Party: Republican
- Spouse: Bertha White
- Children: 4
- Education: University of Kansas

John E. Chandler (July 13, 1915 – October 15, 1982) was an American politician who served in the Kansas State Senate from 1977 to 1982.

Chandler was born in Topeka and raised in Junction City and Lawrence. He attended the University of Kansas, where he studied political science, and served in the U.S. Army during World War II, serving as a major with a tank battalion in the European theater. After the war, he worked in public relations for several oil companies before purchasing the Holton Recorder, a local newspaper, in 1950; he served as publisher there for the rest of his life.

Chandler was elected to the Kansas State Senate in 1976 and re-elected in 1980. He died of a heart attack while mowing his lawn in October 1982, in the midst of his second Senate term; Francis Gordon was appointed to replace him.
