= 1886 Georgia gubernatorial election =

Georgian gubernational election

- October 6, 1886
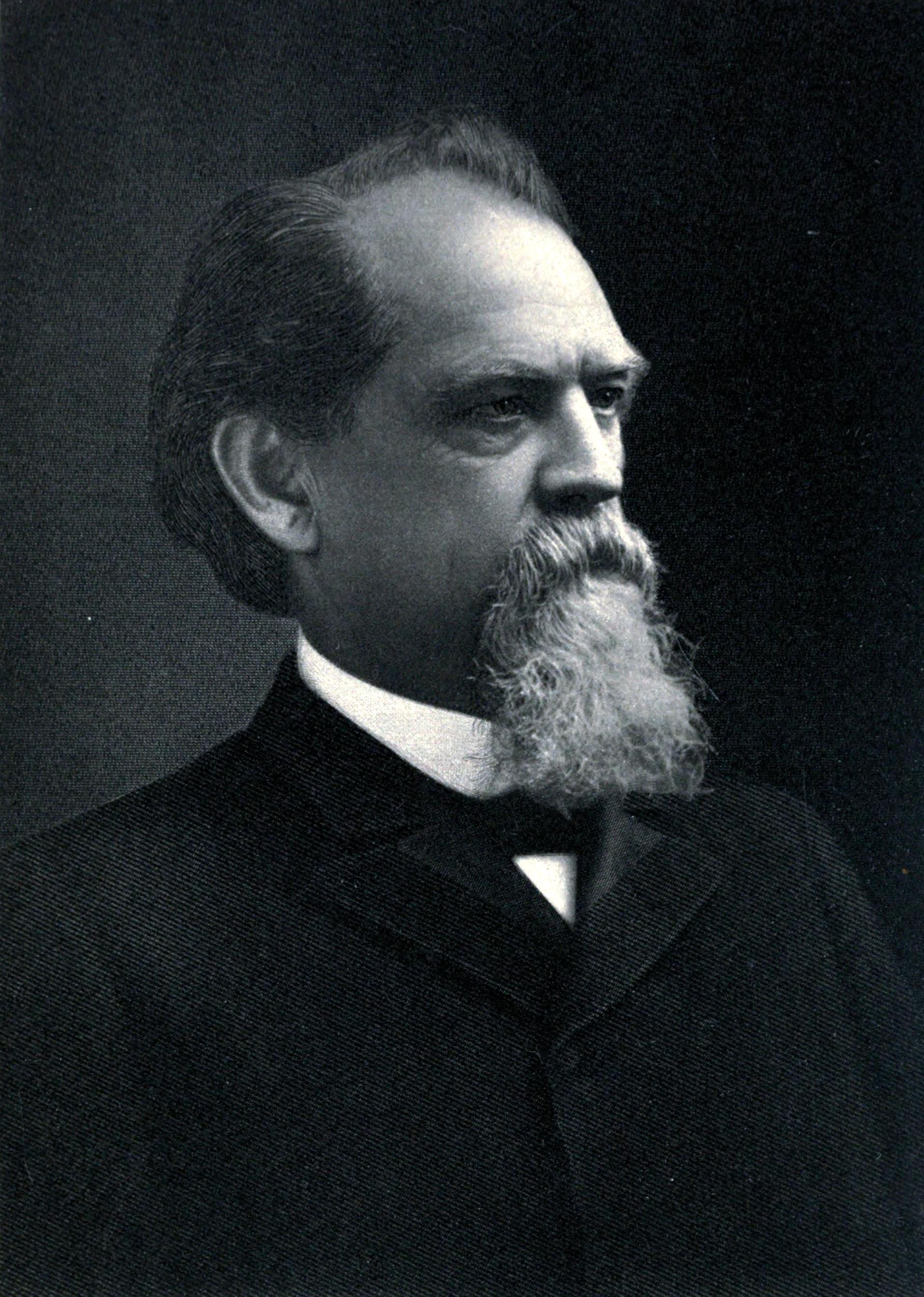
Nominee	John B. Gordon
Party	Democratic
Popular vote	101,159
Percentage	99.20%
- Results by County: Gordon: >90%
Governor before election
Henry Dickerson McDaniel
Democratic
Elected Governor
John B. Gordon
Democratic

The 1886 Georgia gubernatorial election was held on October 6, 1886, in order to elect the Governor of Georgia. Democratic nominee, former United States Senator from Georgia and candidate for Governor in the 1868 election John B. Gordon ran unopposed and thus won the election.

== General election ==
On election day, October 6, 1886, Democratic nominee John B. Gordon won the election with 99.20% of the vote, thereby holding Democratic control over the office of Governor. Gordon was sworn in as the 53rd Governor of Georgia on November 9, 1886.

=== Results ===
Georgia gubernatorial election, 1886
Party	Candidate	Votes	%
Democratic	John B. Gordon	101,159	99.20
	Others	815	0.80
Total votes		101,974	100.00
Democratic hold			
