= Arthur W. Fenton =

American politician

Member of the Kansas House of Representatives from the 1st district
- In office January 8, 1923 – January 12, 1931
- Preceded by: John S. Norman
- Succeeded by: Louis Strong

Personal details
- Party: Republican

Arthur W. Fenton was an American politician who was a member of the Kansas House of Representatives from 1923 to 1931.

Fenton lived in Bendena, Kansas during his time in the legislature, where he worked as a farmer.
