= Ray Glick =

American politician

Member of the Kansas House of Representatives from the 1st district
- In office January 13, 1941 – January 8, 1945
- Preceded by: C.I. Moyer
- Succeeded by: Leslie Thomson

Personal details
- Born: November 13, 1889 Summerfield, Kansas, US
- Died: February 15, 1976 (aged 86) St. Joseph, Missouri, US
- Party: Republican

Ray F. Glick (November 13, 1889 – February 15, 1976) was an American politician who was a member of the Kansas House of Representatives from 1941 to 1945.

Glick was born in Summerfield, Kansas in 1889. He worked as a banker while in the legislature. He was originally elected to the State House in 1940, and was re-elected in 1942.
