= C.I. Moyer =

American politician

Cy Moyer

Member of the Kansas Senate from the 1st district
- In office January 13, 1941 – January 8, 1945

Member of the Kansas House of Representatives from the 1st district
- In office January 9, 1939 – January 13, 1941
- Preceded by: Gerald Gordon
- Succeeded by: Ray Glick

Personal details
- Born: June 14, 1904 Severance, Kansas, US
- Died: January 27, 1974 (aged 69) Kansas City, Missouri, US
- Party: Republican
- Spouse: Ruth Elizabeth Corcoran

C.I "Cy" Moyer (June 14, 1904 – January 27, 1974) was an American politician who was a member of the Kansas House of Representatives and Kansas State Senate from 1939 to 1945.

Moyer was born in Severance, Kansas in 1904. He worked as a farmer and stockman while in the legislature. He was originally elected to the State House in 1938, serving from 1939 to 1940. After his single term in the State House, he was elected to the State Senate in 1940, where he also served a single term.
