= Leslie Thomson =

American politician

Member of the Kansas House of Representatives from the 1st district
- In office January 8, 1945 – January 10, 1955
- Preceded by: Ray Glick
- Succeeded by: Edward F. Gordon

Personal details
- Died: June 30, 1966
- Party: Republican

Leslie Thomson (died June 30, 1966) was an American politician who was a member of the Kansas House of Representatives for 10 years from 1945 to 1955.

Thomson lived in White Cloud, Kansas and worked as a farmer.
