= Eduardo Gordon =

Eduardo Gordon may refer to:

- Eduardo Gordon (basketball) (1928–2009), Uruguayan Olympic basketball player
- Eduardo Gordon Cañas (1918−2001), Chilean police officer, football official and diplomat
- Eduardo Gordon Valcárcel (born 1952), Chilean police officer, director–general of the Carabineros

== See also ==
- Edward Gordon (disambiguation)
