= Bill Fribley =

American politician

Member of the Kansas House of Representatives from the 22nd district
- In office 1949 – January 9, 1961

Member of the Kansas House of Representatives from the 23rd district
- In office January 9, 1961 – January 9, 1967

Member of the Kansas House of Representatives from the 1st district
- In office January 9, 1967 – 1969
- Preceded by: Jack Euler
- Succeeded by: Leroy Brunson

Personal details
- Born: January 8, 1926 Miami, OK
- Died: March 25, 1994 (aged 68) Louisiana
- Party: Republican

Bill H. Fribley (January 8, 1926 — March 25, 1994) was a member of the Kansas House of Representatives for 20 years.

Fribley was born in Miami, Oklahoma and came to Kansas in 1936. He became disabled while fighting in World War II. After returning home from the war, he was elected to the Kansas House of Representatives as a Republican in the 1948 elections, originally from House District 22. He was elected from District 23 after the 1960 Census and redistricting, and won his final two terms in the 1st District (1966 and 1968). During his time in the House, Fribley served as House Majority Leader and chaired the Ways and Means Committee.

In fall of 1969, Fribley was appointed by President Richard Nixon to head the Ozarks Regional Commission, a federal economic development agency. Leroy Brunson finished out the remainder of his term. Fribley died of a heart attack while vacationing in Louisiana in 1994, at the age of 68.
