= John B. Gordon =

American politician and Confederate general (1832–1904)

John Brown Gordon
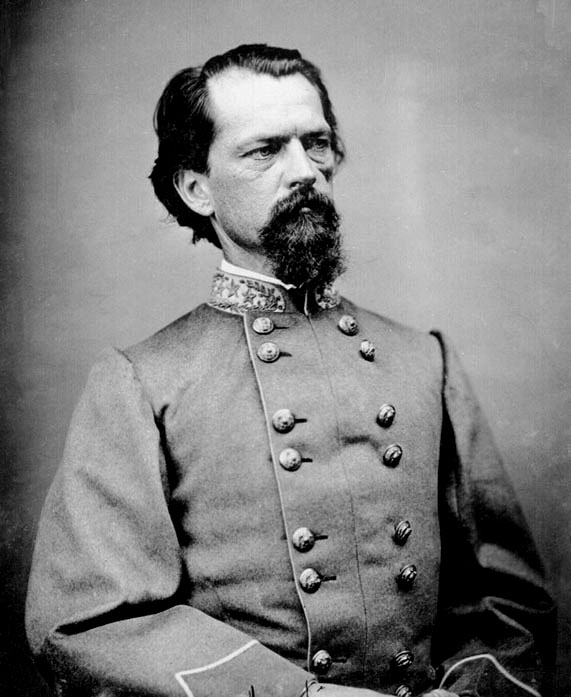
- Gordon in uniform, c. 1862

United States Senator from Georgia
- In office March 4, 1873 – May 26, 1880
- Preceded by: Joshua Hill
- Succeeded by: Joseph E. Brown
- In office March 4, 1891 – March 3, 1897
- Preceded by: Joseph E. Brown
- Succeeded by: Alexander S. Clay

53rd Governor of Georgia
- In office November 9, 1886 – November 8, 1890
- Preceded by: Henry D. McDaniel
- Succeeded by: William J. Northen

Personal details
- Born: February 6, 1832 Upson County, Georgia, U.S.
- Died: January 9, 1904 (aged 71) Miami, Florida, U.S.
- Party: Democratic
- Spouse: Rebecca "Fanny" Haralson (m. 1854)
- Children: 6

Military service
- Allegiance: Confederate States
- Branch/service: Confederate States Army
- Years of service: 1861–1865
- Rank: Major General
- Commands: Second Corps, Army of Northern Virginia
- Battles/wars: See list: American Civil War; First Battle of Bull Run; Seven Days Battles; Battle of Malvern Hill; Maryland Campaign; Battle of Antietam; Battle of Shepherdstown; Gettysburg campaign; Battle of Gettysburg; Overland Campaign; Battle of the Wilderness; Battle of Spotsylvania Court House; Battle of Cold Harbor; Valley Campaigns of 1864; Battle of Lynchburg; Battle of Monocacy; Battle of Fort Stevens; Battle of Cool Spring; Battle of Opequon; Battle of Fisher's Hill; Battle of Cedar Creek; Siege of Petersburg; Battle of Fort Stedman; Appomattox Campaign; Battle of Appomattox Court House

John Brown Gordon (February 6, 1832 – January 9, 1904) was an American politician, Confederate States Army general, attorney, slaveowner and planter. "One of Robert E. Lee's most trusted generals" by the end of the Civil War, according to historian Ed Bearss, he strongly opposed Reconstruction. A member of the Democratic Party, he was twice elected by the Georgia state legislature as a United States Senator (as was the practice at the time), serving from 1873 to 1880, and again from 1891 to 1897. He served two terms as the 53rd governor of Georgia from 1886 to 1890.

== Early life ==
John Brown Gordon was of Scottish and English descent and was born on the farm of his parents Zachariah Gordon and his wife in Upson County, Georgia; he was the fourth of twelve children. Many Gordon family members had fought in the Revolutionary War. His family moved to Walker County, Georgia by 1840, where his father was recorded in the US census that year as owning a plantation with 18 slaves.

Gordon was a student at the University of Georgia, where he was a member of the Mystical 7 Society. He left before graduating to "read the law" in Atlanta, where he passed the bar examination.

Gordon and his father, Zachariah, invested in a series of coal mines in Tennessee and Georgia. He also practiced law. In 1854, Gordon married Rebecca "Fanny" Haralson, daughter of Hugh Anderson Haralson and his wife. They had a long marriage and six children.

In 1860, Gordon owned one slave, a 14-year-old girl. His father owned four slaves in that same census year.

== Civil War ==
Although lacking military education or experience, Gordon was elected captain of a company of the 6th Alabama Infantry Regiment. He was present at First Manassas, but did not see any action. During a reorganization of the Confederate army in May 1862, the regiment's original colonel, John Siebels, resigned, and Gordon was elected the new colonel. Gordon's first combat experience happened a few weeks later at Seven Pines, when his regiment was in the thick of the fighting. During the battle, Gordon witnessed his younger brother, Augustus Gordon, lying among the Confederate casualties, bleeding profusely with what appeared to be a fatal wound to the lungs. Augustus survived, but was killed a year later at the Battle of Chancellorsville. Toward the end of the two-day Battle of Seven Pines, Gordon took over as brigade commander from Brig. Gen. Robert Rodes when Rodes was wounded. Shortly after the battle, the 26th Alabama was transferred to Rodes's Brigade as part of an army reorganization. Its commander, Col. Edward O'Neal, outranked Gordon and thus took command of the brigade until Rodes resumed command just before the Seven Days Battles. Gordon was again hotly engaged at Gaines' Mill, and he was wounded in the eyes during the assault on Malvern Hill. On June 29, Rodes, still suffering from the effects of his wound, took a leave of absence; O'Neal commanded the brigade once again. During the Northern Virginia Campaign, Gordon and his regiment were kept in the Richmond area.

Assigned by General Lee to hold the vital sunken road, or "Bloody Lane", during the Battle of Sharpsburg, Gordon suffered new wounds. First, a Minié ball passed through his calf. A second ball hit him higher in the same leg. A third ball went through his left arm. Gordon continued to lead his men, despite the fact that the muscles and tendons in his arm were mangled and a small artery was severed. A fourth ball hit him in his shoulder. Despite pleas for him to go to the rear, Gordon remained on the front lines. He was finally stopped by a ball that hit him in the face, passing through his left cheek and out of his jaw. He fell with his face in his cap, and might have drowned in his own blood if it had not drained out through a bullet hole in the cap. A Confederate surgeon thought that he would not survive. After being returned to Virginia, Gordon was nursed back to health by his wife.

Impressed with Gordon's performance, Lee requested a promotion to brigadier general on November 1, 1862; however, this was not confirmed by the Confederate States Congress due to his being wounded. After months of recuperation, Gordon returned to service, receiving the command of a brigade of Georgians in Jubal A. Early's division. When he returned to duty, Lee requested a promotion again, which was approved by the Confederate Congress, ranking from May 7, 1863.

During the Confederate invasion of Pennsylvania, Gordon's brigade occupied Wrightsville on the Susquehanna River, the farthest east in Pennsylvania that any organized Confederate troops would reach. Union militia under Col. Jacob G. Frick burned a mile-and-a-quarter-long covered wooden bridge to prevent Gordon from crossing the river, and the fire soon spread to parts of Wrightsville. Gordon's troops formed a bucket brigade and managed to prevent further destruction to the town.

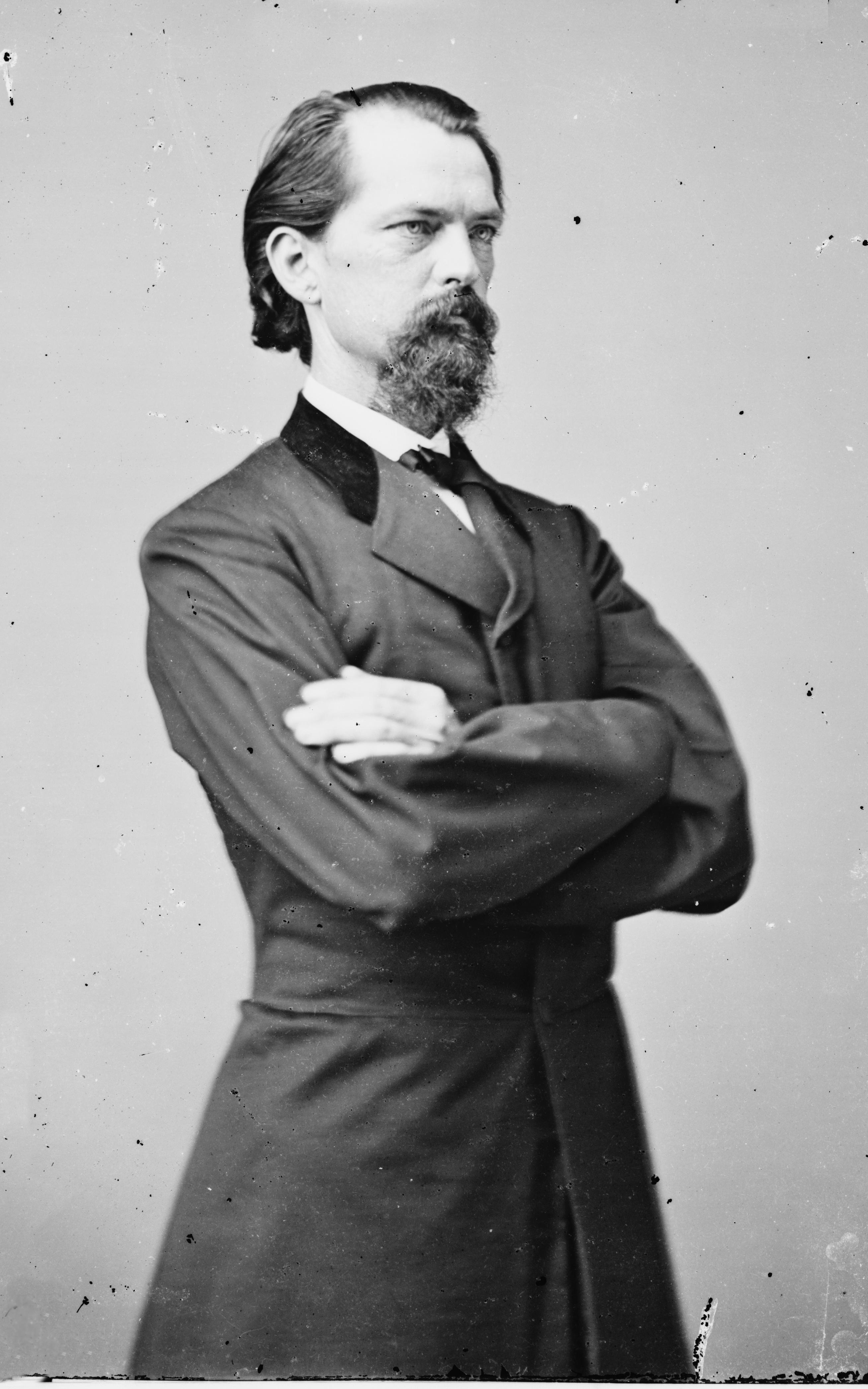
Gordon portrait by Mathew Brady, c. 1855–1865

At the Battle of Gettysburg on July 1, Gordon's brigade and other units drove the Union XI Corps from Barlow's Knoll. There, he aided the opposing division commander, Francis Barlow, who was wounded. This incident led to a story about the two officers meeting later in Washington, D.C., Gordon unaware that Barlow had survived the battle. The story was told by Barlow and Gordon and published in newspapers and in Gordon's postwar memoir.

Seated at Clarkson Potter's table, I asked Barlow: "General, are you related to the Barlow who was killed at Gettysburg?" He replied: "Why, I am the man, sir. Are you related to the Gordon who killed me?" "I am the man, sir," I responded. No words of mine can convey any conception of the emotions awakened by those startling announcements. Nothing short of an actual resurrection from the dead could have amazed either of us more. Thenceforward, until his untimely death in 1896, the friendship between us, which was born amidst the thunders of Gettysburg, was greatly cherished by both.

— John B. Gordon, Reminiscences of the Civil War

Barlow returned to service in spring 1864, seeing action in the Overland Campaign, Siege of Petersburg, and the Appomattox Campaign; his men would ultimately face Gordon's troops again during the Battle of High Bridge in April 1865.

At the start of the 1864 Overland Campaign, in the Battle of the Wilderness, Gordon proposed a flanking attack against the Union right that might have had a decisive effect on the battle had Gen. Early allowed him freedom to launch it before late in the day. Gordon was an aggressive general; in a letter to Confederate President Jefferson Davis, Gen. Robert E. Lee said Gordon was one of his best brigadiers, "characterized by splendid audacity". On May 8, 1864, Gordon was given command of Early's division in Lt. Gen. Richard S. Ewell's (later Early's) corps, being promoted to major general on May 14. Gordon's success in turning back the massive Union assault in the Battle of Spotsylvania Court House (the Bloody Angle) prevented a Confederate rout. His division was held in reserve at the Battle of North Anna and was positioned in the Magnolia Swamp, north of where the major fighting occurred at the Battle of Cold Harbor.

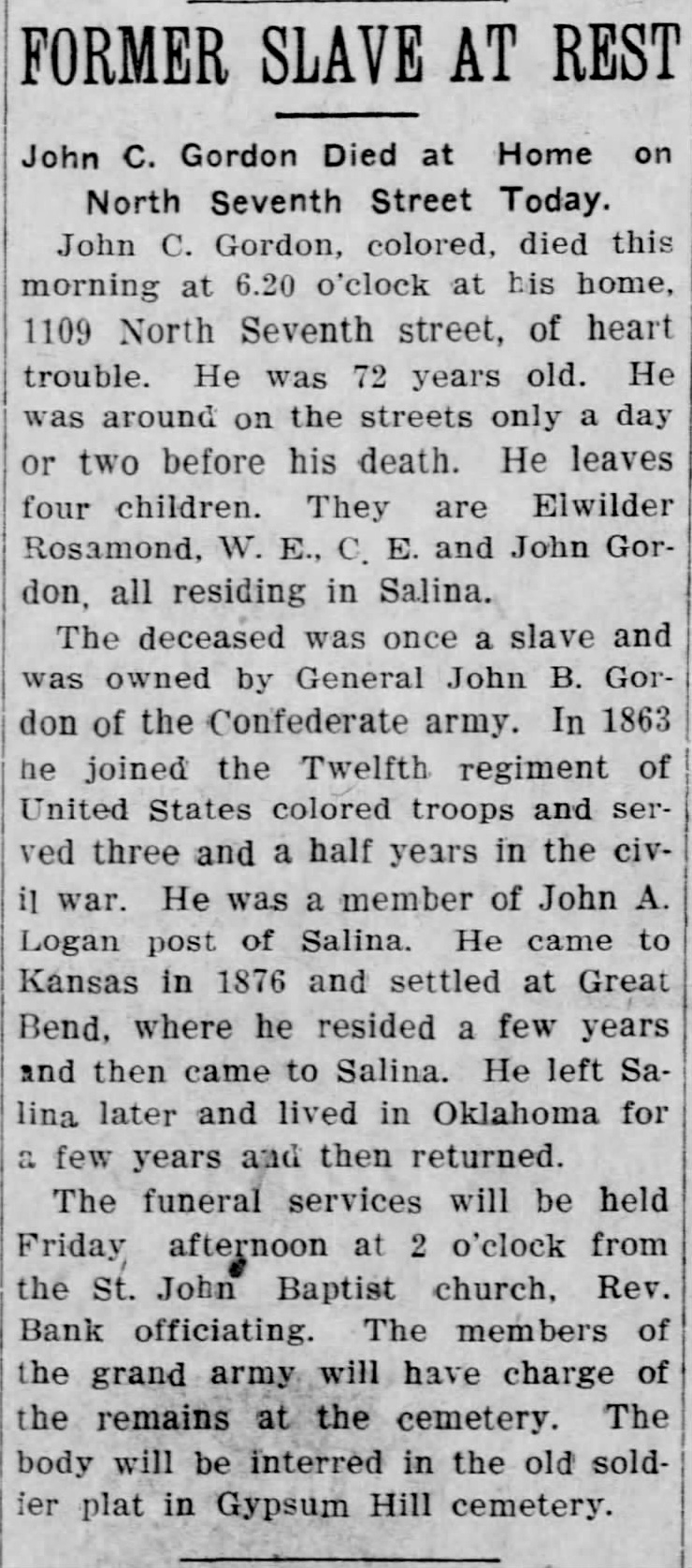
John C. Gordon, a man who had been owned by John B. Gordon, joined the Union's 12th United States Colored Infantry Regiment in 1863 (The Salina Daily Union, May 5, 1910)

Gordon left with Early for the Valley Campaigns of 1864, participating in the Battle of Lynchburg and in Early's Invasion of Maryland at the Battle of Monocacy before being wounded August 25, 1864, at Shepherdstown, West Virginia after they returned across the Potomac. After having a wound over his right eye dressed, Gordon returned to the battle. Confederate cartographer Jedediah Hotchkiss's official report of the incident stated, "Quite a lively skirmish ensued, in which Gordon was wounded in the head, but he gallantly dashed on, the blood streaming over him."

At the Third Battle of Winchester, Gordon's wife, Fanny, accompanying her husband on the campaign as a general's wives sometimes did, rushed out into the street to urge Gordon's retreating troops to go back and face the enemy. Gordon was horrified to find her in the street with shells and balls flying about her. Gordon continued to lead a division in Early's Army of the Valley, fighting at Fisher's Hill and Cedar Creek, where he led an overnight flanking maneuver around the northern base of Massanutten Mountain, followed by an early morning assault that he had devised while previously surveying the Union position from Signal Knob. The assault nearly crushed the Federal line at the Belle Grove Plantation before a "fatal halt" turned the tide of battle and doomed Gordon's successes made earlier in the day.

Returning to Lee's army around Richmond after Early's defeat at Cedar Creek, Gordon led the Second Corps of the Army of Northern Virginia until the end of the war. In this role, he defended the line in the Siege of Petersburg and commanded the attack on Fort Stedman on March 25, 1865. There he was wounded again, in the leg.

In April 1865, he was pursued by Francis Barlow, who had returned to service just days before, during the Battle of High Bridge in Virginia. At Appomattox Court House, Gordon led his men in the last charge of the Army of Northern Virginia, capturing the entrenchments and several pieces of artillery in his front just before the surrender.

On April 9, 1865, Gordon's cavalry unit drove a brigade of Union infantry from a high ridge near Appomattox; Gordon looked around and realized that Lee`s embattled army was surrounded on three sides by masses of Union infantry. When Lee got word of the situation, he knew that escape was impossible and made up his mind to surrender to Grant that same day. On April 12, Gordon's Confederate troops officially surrendered to Bvt. Maj. Gen. Joshua Chamberlain, acting for Lt. Gen. Ulysses S. Grant. Chamberlain recorded this event in detail:

The momentous meaning of this occasion impressed me deeply. I resolved to mark it by some token of recognition, which could be no other than a salute of arms. Well aware of the responsibility assumed, and of the criticisms that would follow, as the sequel proved, nothing of that kind could move me in the least. The act could be defended, if needful, by the suggestion that such a salute was not to the cause for which the flag of the Confederacy stood, but to its going down before the flag of the Union. My main reason, however, was one for which I sought no authority nor asked forgiveness. Before us in proud humiliation stood the embodiment of manhood: men whom neither toils and sufferings, nor the fact of death, nor disaster, nor hopelessness could bend from their resolve; standing before us now, thin, worn, and famished, but erect, and with eyes looking level into ours, waking memories that bound us together as no other bond;—was not such manhood to be welcomed back into a Union so tested and assured? Instructions had been given, and when the head of each division column comes opposite our group, our bugle sounds the signal and instantly our whole line from right to left, regiment by regiment in succession, gives the soldier's salutation, from the "order arms" to the old "carry"—the marching salute. Gordon at the head of the column, riding with heavy spirit and downcast face, catches the sound of shifting arms, looks up, and, taking the meaning, wheels superbly, making with himself and his horse one uplifted figure, with profound salutation as he drops the point of his sword to the boot toe; then facing to his own command, gives word for his successive brigades to pass us with the same position of the manual,—honor answering honor. On our part not a sound of trumpet more, nor roll of drum; not a cheer, nor word nor whisper of vain-glorying, nor motion of man standing again at the order, but an awed stillness rather, and breath-holding, as if it were the passing of the dead!

— Joshua L. Chamberlain, The Passing of the Armies, pp. 260–61

In his book Hymns of the Republic: The Story of the Final Year of the American Civil War, S. C. Gwynne states that this account is "one of the most cherished of the bogus Appomattox stories ... [but] ... there is no convincing evidence that it ever happened ... [N]one of the thirty thousand other people who saw the surrender noted any such event". According to Gwynne, Chamberlain was, in his later years, "one of the great embellishers of the war".

[Chamberlain's] memoirs ... often reflect[ed] the world as he wanted it to be instead of the way it was. For one thing, he did not command the troops at the ceremony, as he claimed, and thus couldn't order the men to salute. His story, moreover, changed significantly over the years. ... Its staying power was mostly rooted in the fact that Gordon never refuted it. The rebel general apparently liked it, and it reflected well on him, as the time went by Gordon added his own liberal embellishments, including the suggestion that Lee himself had led the Army through town. The two generals would clearly have preferred this distinctly Walter Scott-like sequence, described in countless books and memoirs, to the decidedly less romantic one that actually took place.

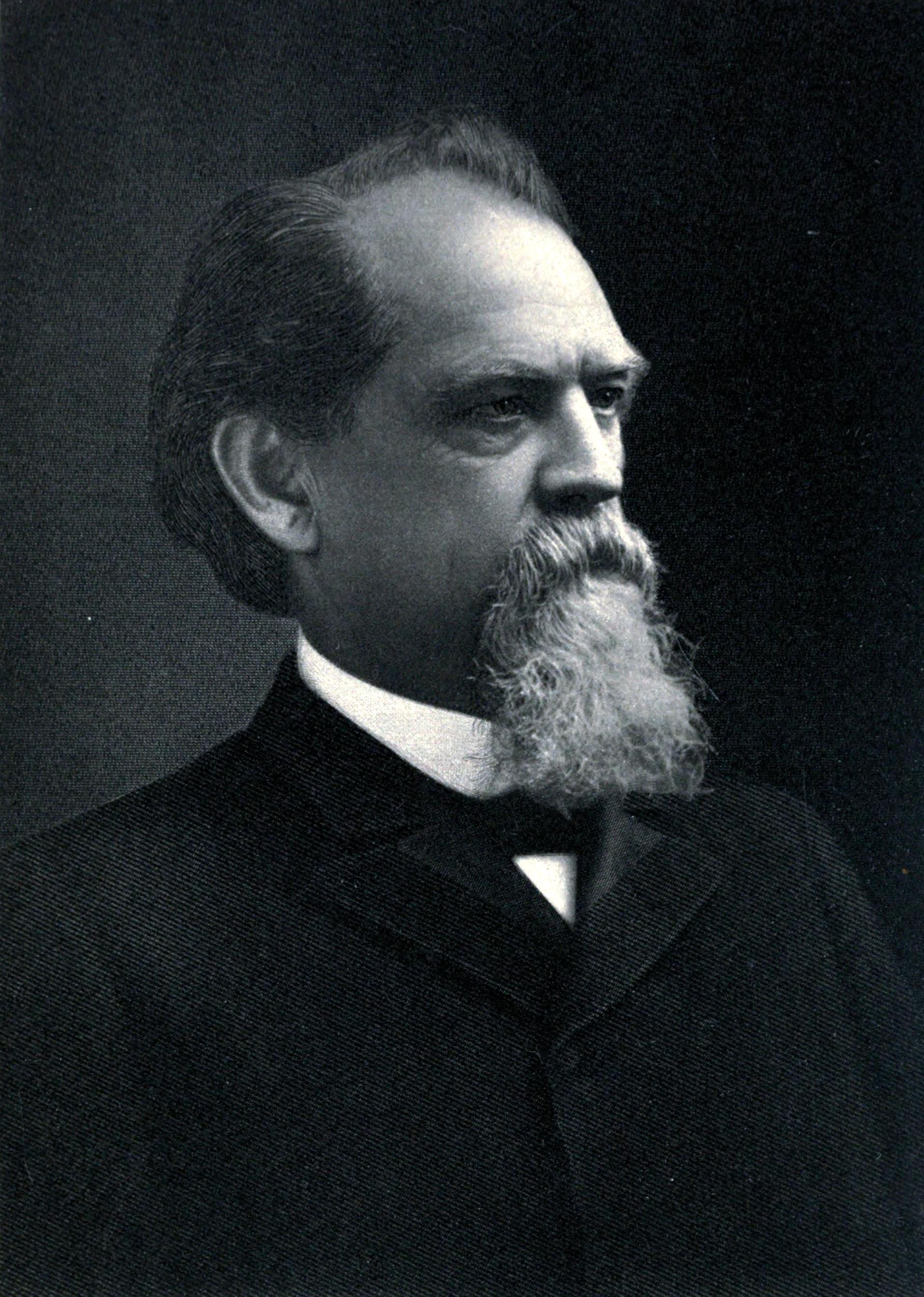
Postbellum engraving by Campbell Brothers, New York

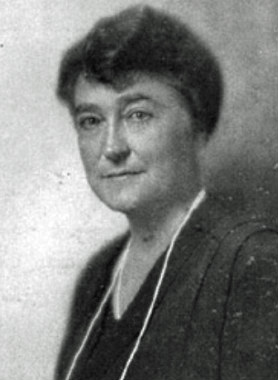
Caroline Gordon Brown, of Berlin, New Hampshire, was Gordon's daughter

Though Gordon often claimed he was promoted to lieutenant general, there is no official record of this.

== Postbellum career ==
As the government of the State of Georgia was being reconstituted for readmission to the Union, Gordon ran as the Democratic candidate for governor in 1868, but was defeated by Republican Rufus Bullock in a vote of 83,527 to 76,356. He was a presidential elector in 1868.

Gordon was elected by the state legislature to the US Senate in 1873, as Democrats regained their power in Georgia. In 1879, he became the first ex-Confederate elected to preside over the Senate. He was a strong supporter of the "New South" and industrialization, and he was a part of the Bourbon Triumvirate.

Gordon resigned as senator on May 19, 1880. After his unexpected resignation, Governor Alfred H. Colquitt quickly appointed Joseph E. Brown to succeed Gordon. There were allegations of corruption when it was discovered Gordon resigned to promote a venture for the Georgia Pacific Railway.

It will be found, I trust, that no injustice has been done to either section, to any army, or to any of the great leaders, but that the substance and spirit of the following pages will tend rather to lift to a higher plane the estimate placed by victors and vanquished upon their countrymen of the opposing section, and thus strengthen the sentiment of intersectional fraternity which is essential to complete national unity.

— General John B. Gordon, Reminiscences of the Civil War

He was elected Governor of Georgia in 1886 and served a two-year term. He later returned to national politics, elected by the state legislature to the U.S. Senate in 1890 and serving from 1891 to 1897.

Gordon published a memoir of his Civil War service entitled Reminiscences of the Civil War. (Note: Scribner & Sons published Gordon's book in 1904.)

He gave a series of popular speaking engagements across the country. These lectures, entitled "The Last Days of the Confederacy", were very well received in both the North and South. He tended to focus on anecdotes and incidents that humanized soldiers from both sides. This was a period of reconciliation among the soldiers of the North and the South.

General Gordon was the first Commander-in-Chief of the United Confederate Veterans when the group was organized in 1890. He held this position until his death. He died at the age of 71 while visiting his son in Miami, Florida. His body was returned to Georgia, where he was buried in Oakland Cemetery in Atlanta. Upwards of 75,000 people attended and participated in the memorial ceremonies.

== Racial views ==
It is exceedingly difficult to determine Gordon's exact role in the Klan, but given the nature of his testimony, his almost constant travel throughout Georgia and the South, and his desire to maintain peace, social order, and white supremacy, one can conclude with reasonable certainty that he was at least titular head of the Georgia Ku Klux Klan. Although it is remotely possible that Gordon was unaware of the threats and violence southern whites so often employed against southern blacks, it seems more plausible that Gordon simply "looked the other way" and countenanced such excesses as the price that had to be paid if social peace—a peace determined and defined exclusively by southern whites—was to be regained and preserved. Gordon may not have condoned the violence employed by Klan members, but he did not question or oppose it when he felt it was justified. In this sense, Gordon typified the upper levels of Southern society: he would do what had to be done to assure a white-controlled social order, but he hoped it could be accomplished without violence.

—

Gordon, a former planter, slaveholder, and Confederate general, held white supremacist views on race, which he retained for his lifetime. He opposed Republican efforts at Reconstruction and endorsed measures to preserve a white-dominated society, including restrictions on freedmen and the use of violence against them.

Author Ralph Lowell Eckert concluded that Gordon was a member of the postwar Ku Klux Klan based on the former general's evasive answers during a 1871 hearing. During congressional testimony in 1871, Gordon denied any involvement with the Klan but acknowledged that he was associated with a secret "peace police" organization, whose sole purpose was the "preservation of peace." Gordon was thought to be the titular head of the Ku Klux Klan in Georgia, (Note: Biographical sketches in the references by Deserino, Eicher, and Warner make no mention of Klan involvement. Foner, p. 433, cites Gordon as a "prominent Klansman." George W. Gordon, another Confederate general with a similar name, but unrelated, is one whose involvement with the Klan is not in dispute.) but the organization was so secretive that his role was never proven conclusively. In the midst of Reconstruction, a variety of organizations cropped up in the South, which existed to defy Reconstruction (i.e., the Ku Klux Klan, White League, and Red Shirts). As many of these groups feared arrest while the states were occupied by Federal troops, they generally operated in secret.

In 1866, Gordon made substantial financial and material contributions to help build churches and schools for Black residents of Brunswick, Georgia. He advised them to:

educate themselves and their children, to be industrious, save money and purchase houses, and thus make themselves respectable as property holders, and intelligent people. With submission to the laws, industry, and economy, with union among yourselves, and courtesy and confidence toward the whites, you will reach these ends, and constitute an important element in the community.

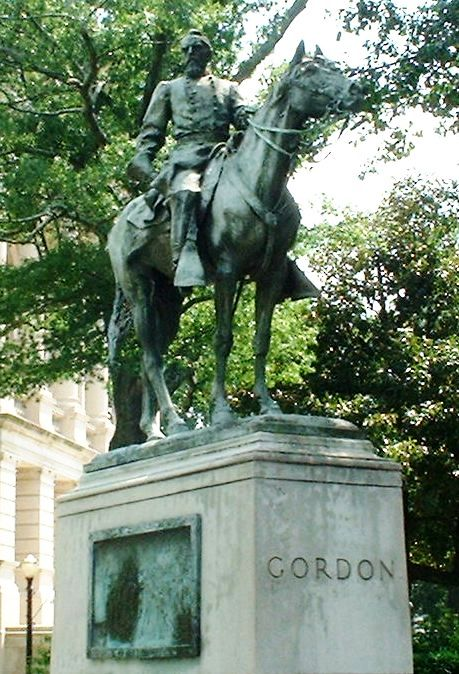
John Brown Gordon statue by sculptor Solon Borglum, located on the northeastern part of the grounds of the Georgia State Capitol

Gordon hoped to ease the tensions between the blacks and whites in coastal Georgia, which had a long history of enslaved African-American workers on plantations.

Gordon seems to have been most concerned with incidents such as black Federal troops mistreating white Georgians, or alleged activities by members of the Union League and Freedmen's Bureau who were reported to have been inciting newly freed slaves to use violence against whites. Historian Ralph Eckert notes that Gordon was willing to support blacks as long as they submitted to being in a subordinate social and political position. Eckert says that Gordon clearly did not believe in racial equality. He notes an 1868 speech in Charleston, South Carolina (a black majority city), in which Gordon said to the blacks in the audience, "If you are disposed to live in peace with the white people, they extend to you the hand of friendship" but "if you attempt to inaugurate a war of races you will be exterminated. The Saxon race was never created by Almighty God to be ruled by the African."

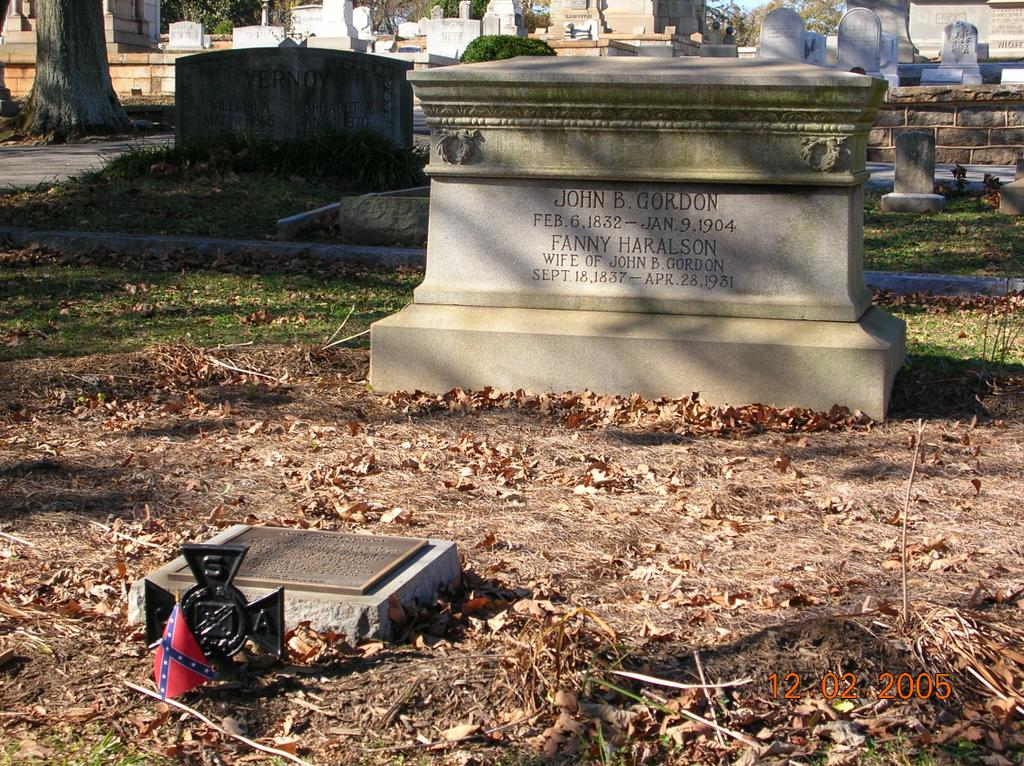
Gordon's grave, Oakland Cemetery, Atlanta, Georgia

== Legacy and honors ==
- Fort Gordon, a U.S. Army installation, and the adjacent Gordon Highway in Augusta, Georgia, were named for Gordon. The fort was renamed Fort Eisenhower as of October 27, 2023, as part of an effort to end the naming of US forts after Confederate officials. On June 11, 2025, it was announced that the current President, Donald Trump, would rename the base back to Fort Gordon, now named after Medal of Honor recipient Master Sergeant Gary Gordon.
- The John Brown Gordon statue on the grounds of the Georgia State Capitol in Atlanta is the only public equestrian statue in the city.
- U.S. Highway 19 in Gordon's native Upson County, Georgia, is named in his honor.
- John B. Gordon Road in Gordon's 2nd home Taylor County, Georgia, is named in his honor.
- A statue dedicated to Gordon stands on the lawn of the Thomaston, Georgia, courthouse.
- Gordon State College (Georgia) in Barnesville, Georgia, is named for him.
- John B. Gordon Hall in LaFayette, Georgia is named for Gordon.
- John B. Gordon Elementary School in Atlanta was named for Gordon.
- John B. Gordon High School in Decatur, Georgia was also named after him. It operated from 1958 until 1987; Gordon was changed to a middle school and renamed as McNair Middle School.

== See also ==
- List of American Civil War generals (Confederate)
- List of commanders-in-chief of the United Confederate Veterans
- Marye (horse)

Party political offices
Vacant Title last held by Joseph E. Brown	Democratic nominee for Governor of Georgia; 1868	Succeeded by James Milton Smith
Preceded by Henry Dickerson McDaniel	Democratic nominee for Governor of Georgia; 1886, 1888	Succeeded by William J. Northen
Political offices
Preceded by Henry Dickerson McDaniel	Governor of Georgia; 1886–1890	Succeeded by William J. Northen
U.S. Senate
Preceded by Joshua Hill	U.S. senator (Class 3) from Georgia; 1873–1880; Served alongside: Thomas M. Norwood, Benjamin H. Hill	Succeeded by Joseph E. Brown
Preceded by Joseph E. Brown	U.S. senator (Class 3) from Georgia; 1891–1897; Served alongside: Alfred H. Colquitt, Patrick Walsh, Augustus O. Bacon	Succeeded by Alexander S. Clay
