= Lewis Hazen =

American politician

Member of the Kansas House of Representatives from the 1st district
- In office January 14, 1957 – January 14, 1963
- Preceded by: Edward F. Gordon
- Succeeded by: Jack Euler

Personal details
- Born: June 18, 1902 Sparks, Oklahoma, US
- Died: February 6, 1978 (aged 75) Doniphan, Kansas, US
- Party: Republican
- Spouse: Georgia Denton Hazen
- Children: 1

Lewis Orville Hazen (June 18, 1902 – February 6, 1978) was an American politician who was a member of the Kansas House of Representatives.

Hazen was born in Sparks, Oklahoma and came to Kansas in 1904. He married in 1923, and had a child, Harlan, in 1928. He worked as a farmer. In 1956, Hazen was elected to represent the 1st District in the Kansas House, where he served for three terms, leaving office after the 1962 elections. He was succeeded by Jack Euler. Hazen died in 1978
