= Eddie Gordon (disambiguation) =

Eddie Gordon is a British music business personality.

Eddie Gordon may also refer to:

- Eddie Gordon (fighter) (born 1983), Jamaican mixed martial artist
- Eddie Gordon (actor) in Sunset Murder Case
- Eddie Gordon, character in the episode "Bar Bet" in Cheers, portrayed by Michael Richards
- Eddie Gordon, character in Castle, portrayed by Neil Brown Jr.
- Eddie Gordon, female character from series 9 of Casualty, portrayed by Joan Oliver

== See also ==
- Edward Gordon (disambiguation)
