= Buckey O'Neill Monument =

Spanish–American War memorial

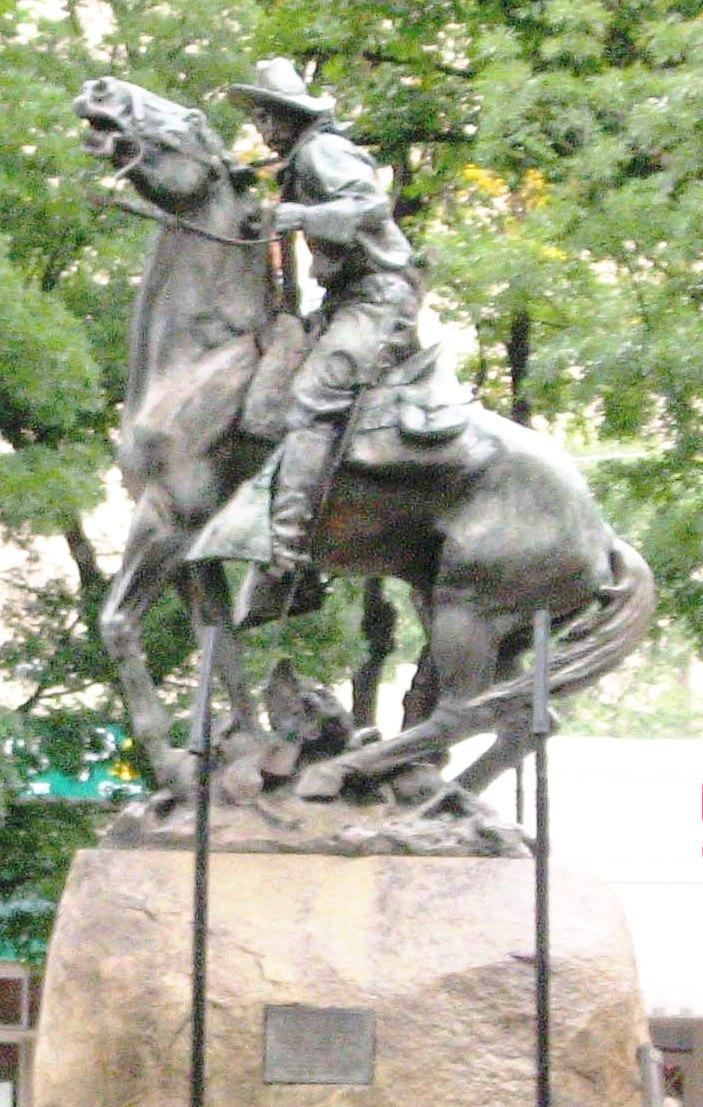
- Artist: Solon Borglum
- Year: 1907
- Type: sculpture
- Location: Prescott, Arizona; 34.5414°N 112.4694°W

The Buckey O'Neill Monument, also known as the Rough Rider Monument, was created by Solon Borglum and is an equestrian sculpture of Buckey O'Neill and honors a group of men who gallantly served their country during the Spanish–American War in 1898. It is located at Courthouse Plaza, Prescott, Arizona. It was dedicated on July 3, 1907 and was rededicated on June 6, 1982, and again on July 3, 1998.

The inscription reads:

(Signature lower proper left side of sculpture)

(On relief plaque, back of granite boulder:)
Solon Borglum

(On plaque, east side of granite boulder:)

ERECTED BY ARIZONA IN HONOR OF THE 1ST. U.S. VOLUNTEER CAVALRY, KNOWN TO HISTORY AS ROOSEVELT'S ROUGH RIDERS, AND IN MEMORY OF CAPTAIN WILLIAM O. O'NEILL AND HIS COMRADES WHO DIED WHILE SERVING THEIR COUNTRY IN THE WAR WITH SPAIN

(On plaque, front of granite boulder:)
UNVEILED JULY 3RD 1907

(On plaque, west side of granite boulder: names of commissioners)

(On plaque, on granite slab on concrete pad, in front of sculpture:)
SOLON HANNIBAL BORGLUM
AMERICA'S FIRST COWBOY SCULPTOR
1868–1922
THIS FREE-SPIRITED SON OF THE WEST, SENSITIVE TO THE CHANGING ERA IN WHICH HE LIVED, PORTRAYED THE WESTERN EPIC IN MARBLE AND BRONZE. OUR "BUCKY O'NEILL" MONUMENTAL BRONZE IS AMONG HIS GREATEST WORKS, AND IS ACCLAIMED BY THE CRITICS AS ONE OF THE FINEST EQUESTRIAN MONUMENTS IN THE WORLD.
PLAQUE DEDICATED JUNE 6, 1982, PRESCOTT COMMUNITY ART TRUST

(On small plaque attached to the upper portion of the granite slab on concrete slab, in front of sculpture:)
DEDICATED TO
FRANK BRITO
A YAQUI NATIVE OF COMPANY H & I
WHOSE NAME IS MISSING ON THIS MONUMENT
AUGUST 24, 2023
BUCKEY O’NEILL CAMP 175
SONS OF SPANISH AMERICAN WAR VETERANS
