= Equestrian statue of John Brown Gordon =

Equestrian statue in Atlanta, Georgia, U.S.

John Brown Gordon statue
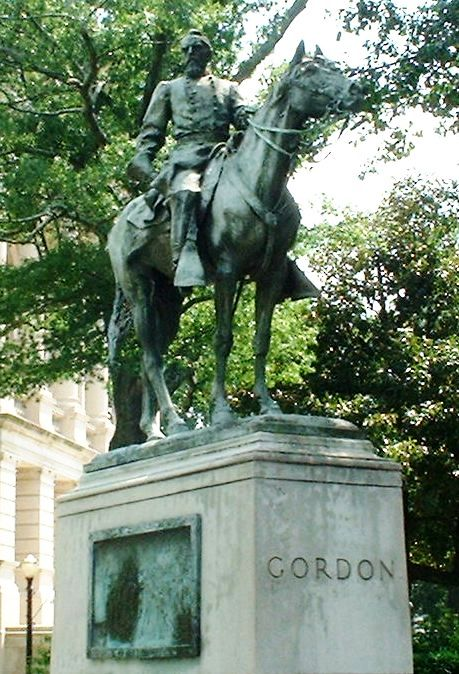
- The statue in 2005
- Interactive map of John Brown Gordon statue
- Location: Georgia State Capitol, Atlanta, Georgia
- Coordinates: 33°44′59″N 84°23′18″W
- Designer: Solon Borglum; Alexander Campbell Bruce (pedestal)
- Builder: McNeel Marble Works (pedestal)
- Type: Equestrian statue
- Material: Bronze; Granite (pedestal)
- Length: 10 feet (3.0 m)
- Width: 4 feet (1.2 m)
- Height: 23 feet (7.0 m)
- Dedicated date: May 25, 1907
- Dedicated to: John Brown Gordon

The equestrian statue of John Brown Gordon is a monument on the grounds of the Georgia State Capitol in Atlanta, Georgia, United States. The monument, an equestrian statue, honors John Brown Gordon, a general in the Confederate States Army during the American Civil War who later become a politician in post-Reconstruction era Georgia. Designed by Solon Borglum, the statue was dedicated in 1907 to large fanfare. Since 2015, the statue has received criticism for Gordon's racist views and associations with the Confederacy, with some calling for its removal.

== History ==
=== Background and creation ===
John Brown Gordon was a noted Confederate general during the American Civil War who served multiple terms as a Senator from Georgia and as Governor of Georgia in the post-Reconstruction era. He was also generally recognized as the leader of the Ku Klux Klan in Georgia and supported both the institution of slavery as well as the Lost Cause of the Confederacy. Following his death on January 9, 1904, multiple civic leaders in Atlanta began to plan a monument in his honor. On January 19, 1904 (Robert E. Lee Day), a meeting at the Georgia State Capitol of groups including the United Daughters of the Confederacy and the United Confederate Veterans was held where Clement A. Evans proposed creating a statue to honor Gordon. The John B. Gordon Monument Association was formed for this purpose, led by William Lowndes Calhoun as its president. While the association was successful in fundraising, a total of $25,000 had to be secured from the state government in order to complete the project. Solon Borglum (whose brother Gutzon Borglum was the first sculptor to work on the Stone Mountain Confederate Memorial) was commissioned to design an equestrian statue of Gordon, which would rest on a pedestal designed by Alexander Campbell Bruce and supplied by the McNeel Marble Works.

The statue, Atlanta's only equestrian statue, was dedicated on the grounds of the Georgia State Capitol on May 25, 1907. Evans served as the main orator for the unveiling, while two daughters of Gordon's did the unveiling. During the dedication, Governor Joseph M. Terrell and another speaker called for the erection of additional monuments on the Capitol grounds for Robert E. Lee, James Longstreet, and the "common soldier", but budgetary issues prevented these plans from coming to fruition. The statue's unveiling attracted many onlookers, and contemporary accounts mention a choir singing "Dixie" to loud cheers during the ceremony. The event took place less than a year after the Atlanta Massacre of 1906. In April 1908, a plaster model of the statue was displayed at an art exhibition held by the National Sculpture Society in Baltimore.

=== Calls for removal ===
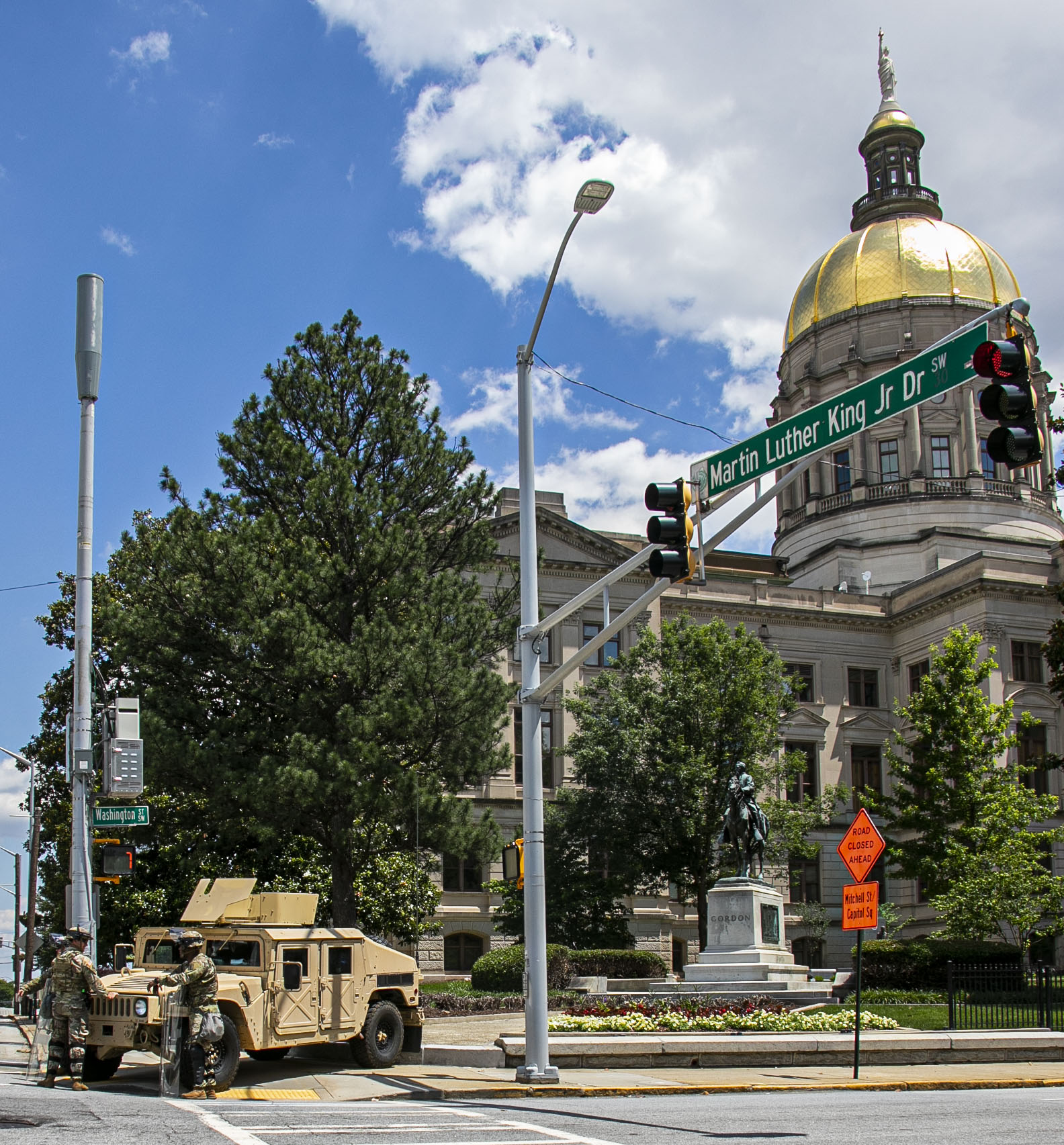
Georgia National Guard near the statue on May 31, 2020

Recently, the statue has come under criticism due to Gordon's stance on race. Following the Charleston church shooting in 2015, a state senator proposed a law forbidding the official recognition of Confederate symbols, including icons such as the Gordon statue. Around the same time, American historian Kenneth W. Noe, speaking with The Atlanta Journal-Constitution, spoke directly about the Gordon statue and others on the Capitol grounds as symbols of the Lost Cause of the Confederacy. In 2019, the government of Georgia passed a law barring the removal of Confederate monuments and memorials.

In 2020, during the George Floyd protests in Atlanta, many protesters called for the removal of the statue, prompting a trending hashtag on Twitter, #TEARDOWNGORDON. On June 8, Bob Trammell, the minority leader in the Georgia House of Representatives, sent a letter to Georgia Governor Brian Kemp asking him to remove the statue of Gordon, saying, "the statue's nexus to hate in our state is overwhelming" and "its presence is both divisive and offensive." Protests regarding the statue and others prompted a barricade to be erected around the Capitol grounds. On June 11, a protester was arrested for vandalizing the statue, writing "tear down" with chalk on the monument. Following these events, 44 descendants of Gordon sent an open letter to Governor Kemp calling for the removal of the statue from the Capitol grounds, stating that "the primary purpose of the statue was to celebrate and mythologize the white supremacists of the Confederacy".

== Design ==
The monument consists of a bronze equestrian statue of Gordon resting on a granite pedestal inscribed with his last name on its front. The horse is modeled after Marye, Gordon's warhorse during the Civil War. Gordon is dressed in his Confederate uniform, but is depicted as an elderly man. Attached to both sides of the pedestal are plaques depicting Gordon. One shows Gordon on horseback during the Battle of Spotsylvania Court House, while the other plaque is a standing portrait of Gordon inscribed with the words "GOVERNOR PATRIOT SENATOR" beneath him. A plaque affixed to the rear of the pedestal is inscribed with a history of Gordon's life, from his birth through his military and political career to his death in 1904.

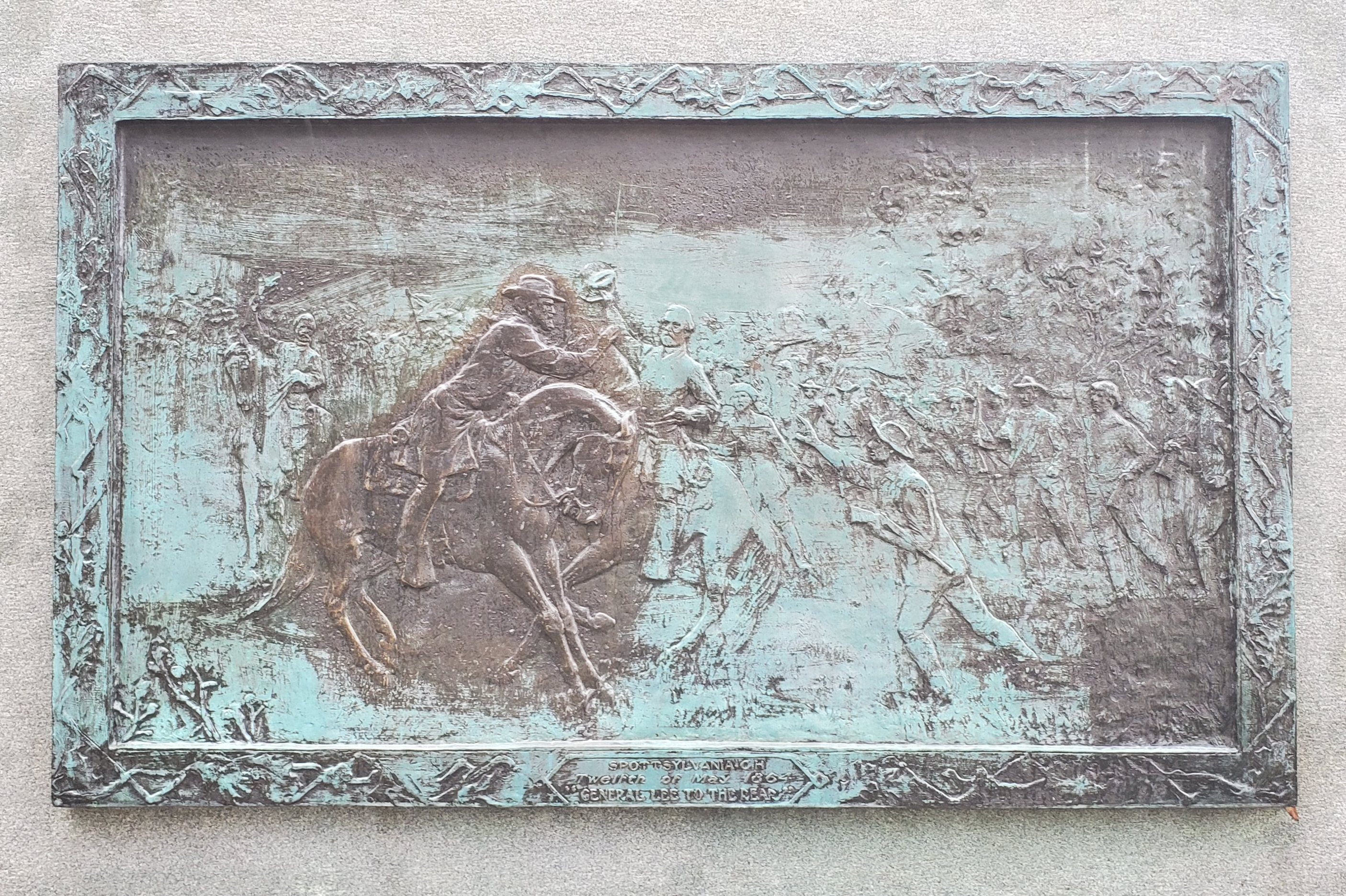
Bas-relief depicting the Battle of Spotsylvania Court House

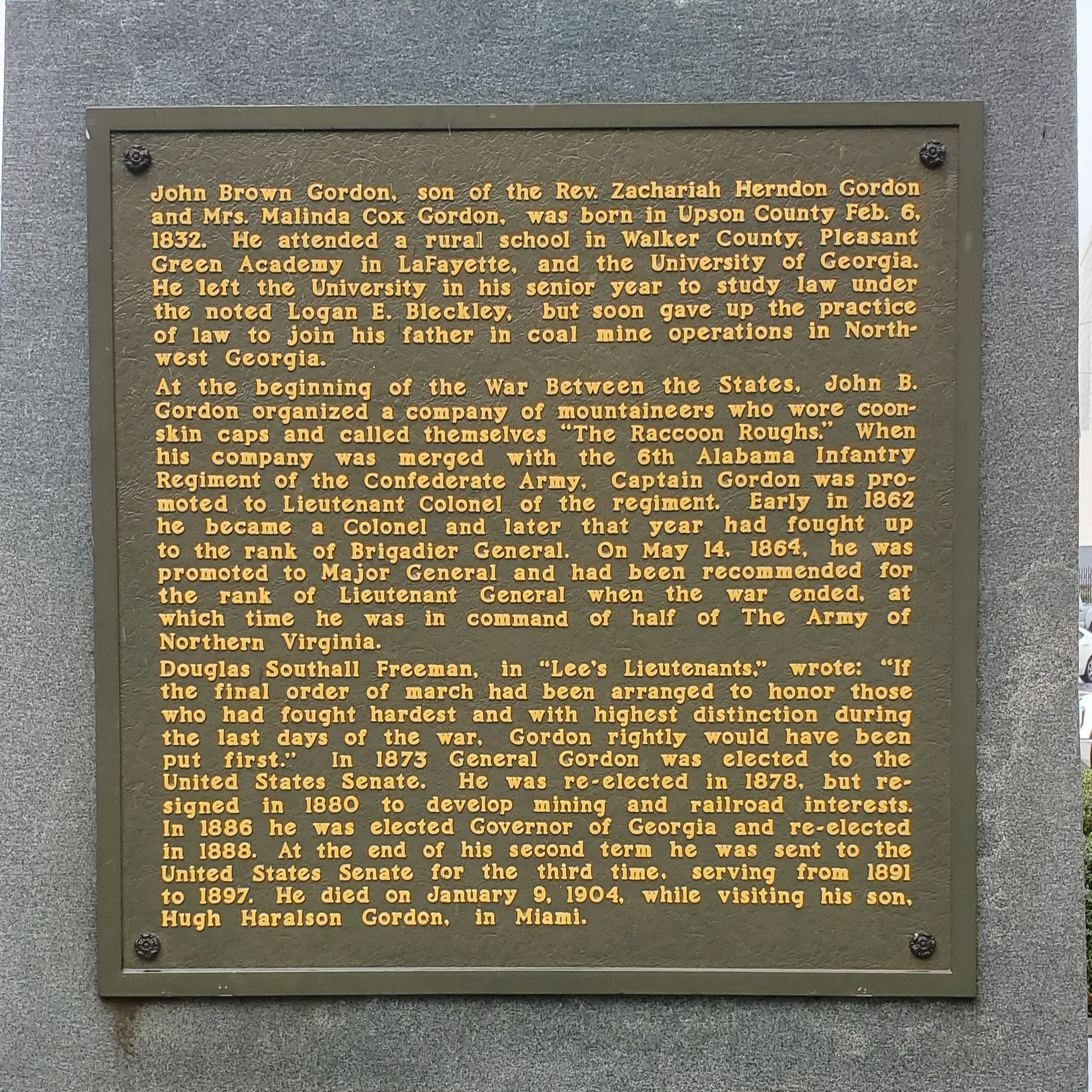
Informational plaque

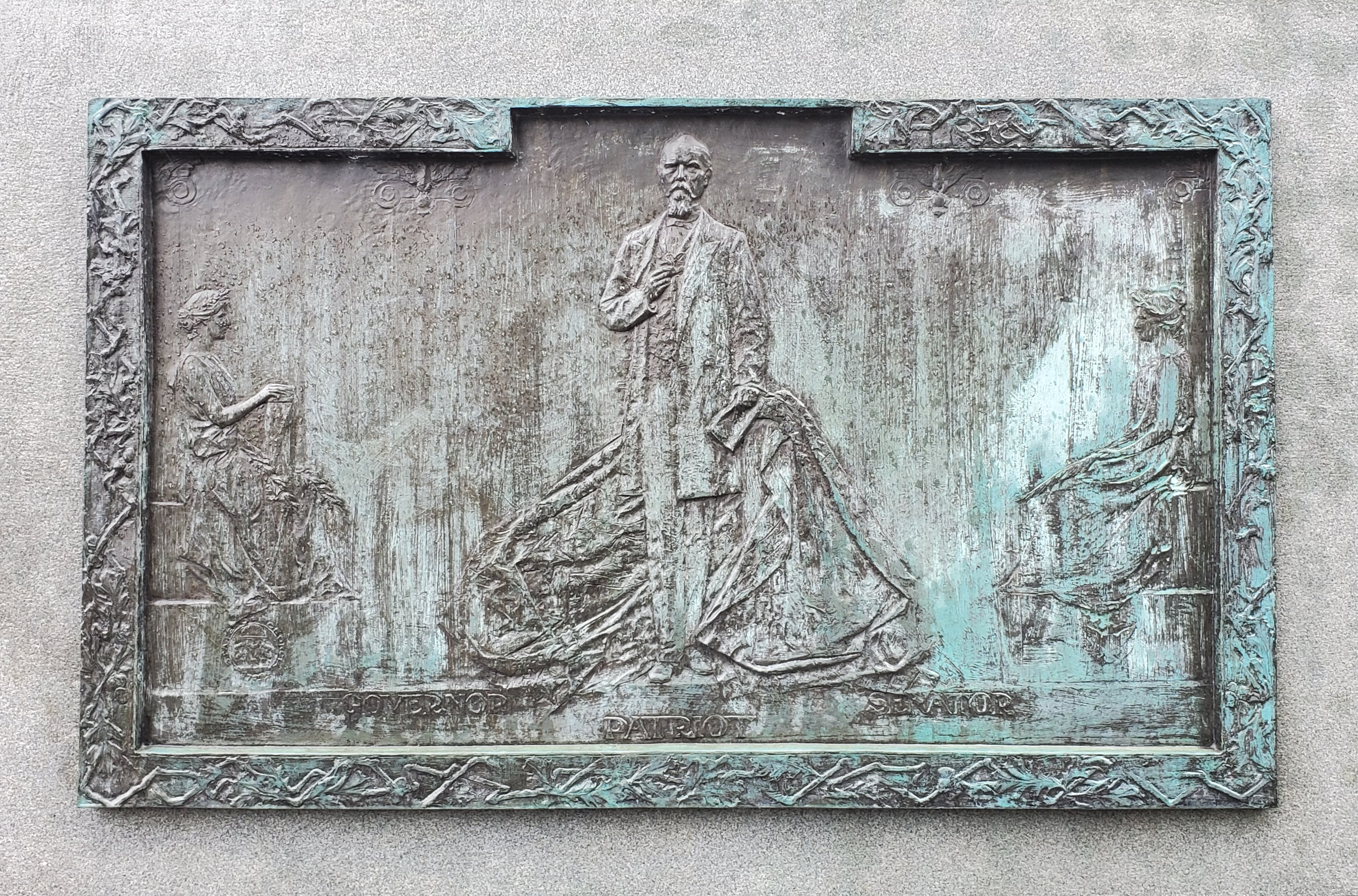
Bas-relief showing portrait of Gordon

The base of the monument measures approximately 8 feet (2.4 m) long, 4 feet (1.2 m) wide, and 12 feet (3.7 m) tall, while the statue measures approximately 10 feet (3.0 m) long, 3 feet (0.91 m) wide, and 11 feet (3.4 m) tall.

== See also ==
- 1907 in art
- List of Confederate monuments and memorials in Georgia
- List of equestrian statues in the United States
