= Pat Weaver (politician) =

American politician

Member of the Kansas House of Representatives from the 1st district
- In office 1984–1986
- Preceded by: Fred Weaver
- Succeeded by: Tim Shallenburger

Personal details
- Born: September 28, 1933 Baxter Springs, KS
- Died: July 2, 2011 (aged 77) Joplin, MO
- Party: Democratic
- Spouse: Fred Weaver
- Children: 5 (3 sons, 2 daughters)

Patricia Kay Weaver (September 28, 1933-July 2, 2011) was a member of the Kansas House of Representatives, serving from 1984 to 1986. She succeeded her husband Fred Weaver after he was appointed to a state tax board in 1983, won re-election in her own right in 1984, and declined to run for re-election in 1986.

Weaver was born Patricia Gardner in Baxter Springs, Kansas in 1933. She married Fred Weaver in 1950, and they had five children. In addition to her time in the state legislature, Weaver served as a member of the Democratic National Committee. She died in 2011 at Freeman West Hospital in Joplin, Missouri, near her hometown of Baxter Springs.
