= Louis Strong =

American politician

Member of the Kansas House of Representatives from the 1st district
- In office January 12, 1931 – January 14, 1935
- Preceded by: Arthur Fenton
- Succeeded by: Gerald Gordon

Personal details
- Born: January 6, 1887 Troy, Kansas, US
- Party: Republican

Louis L. Strong, Jr. (January 6, 1887 – ?) was an American politician who was a member of the Kansas House of Representatives from 1931 to 1935.

Strong was born in Troy, Kansas in 1887. He worked as a horticulturalist and insurer while in the legislature. He was originally elected to the State House in 1930, and was re-elected in 1932.
