= Edward W. Pugh =

American politician

Edward Pugh

Member of the Kansas Senate from the 1st district
- In office February 17, 1997 – 2004
- Preceded by: Don Sallee
- Succeeded by: Dennis Pyle

Member of the Kansas House of Representatives from the 61st district
- In office 1995 – February 17, 1997

Personal details
- Born: July 9, 1949 Wamego, Kansas, U.S.
- Party: Republican

Edward W. Pugh (born July 9, 1949) is an American former politician and attorney from Kansas who served as a member of both the Kansas House of Representatives and the Kansas Senate.

Born in Wamego, Kansas, Pugh first entered politics in the mid-1990s, winning a seat in the Kansas House in the 1994 midterm elections and taking office in 1995. He won re-election in 1996, but did not finish his term; instead, he was appointed to the Kansas Senate to finish the term of Don Sallee, who resigned his seat. Pugh won re-election in his own right in 2000, and served in the Senate until 2004.
