= Jack D. Gordon =

American politician

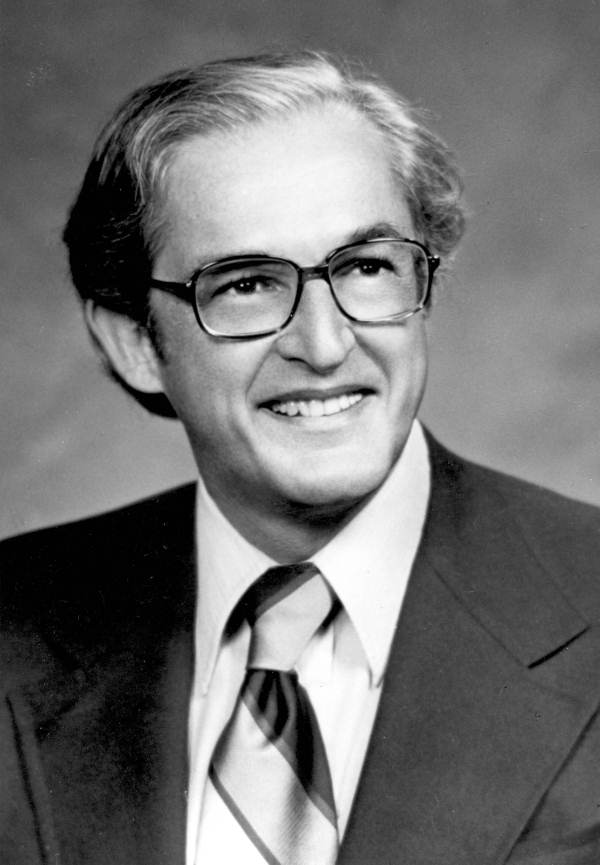
- Gordon in 1974

Member of the Florida Senate from the 35th district
- In office 1972–1992
- Preceded by: Jerry Thomas
- Succeeded by: Mark Foley

Personal details
- Born: June 3, 1922 Detroit, Michigan, U.S.
- Died: December 17, 2005 (aged 83) Palm Springs, California, U.S.
- Party: Democratic
- Education: University of Michigan

Jack D. Gordon (June 3, 1922 – December 17, 2005) was an American politician. He served as a Democratic member for the 35th district of the Florida Senate.

== Life and career ==
Gordon was born in Detroit, Michigan. He attended the University of Michigan.

Gordon served in the Florida Senate from 1972 to 1992, representing the 35th district.

Gordon is the namesake for the Florida College writing requirement "The Gordon Rule."

Gordon died on December 17, 2005, after being hit by a car in Palm Springs, California, at the age of 83.
