= Edward F. Gordon (politician, born 1904) =

American politician

Member of the Kansas Senate from the 1st district
- In office January 14, 1957 – January 9, 1961

Member of the Kansas House of Representatives from the 1st district
- In office January 10, 1955 – January 14, 1957
- Preceded by: Leslie Thomson
- Succeeded by: Lewis Hazen

Personal details
- Born: May 16, 1904 Highland, Kansas, US
- Died: September 27, 1975 (aged 71) Topeka, Kansas, US
- Party: Republican
- Spouse: Ruth Guthrie
- Relations: Gerald Gordon (brother)
- Children: One daughter and two sons, including Francis Gordon

Edward F. Gordon (May 16, 1904 – September 27, 1975) was an American politician who was a member of the Kansas House of Representatives and Kansas State Senate during the 1950s.

Gordon was born in Highland, Kansas in 1904. He married on March 7, 1928, and had a child, Francis Gordon, shortly thereafter. He worked as a farmer and conservation contractor while in the legislature. He was originally elected to the State House in 1954, serving from 1955 to 1957; the seat had earlier been held by his brother Gerald Gordon from 1935 to 1939. After a single term there, he was elected to the Kansas State Senate, where he also served a single term (1957–1961). Gordon died in 1975.
