= Francis Gordon (politician) =

American politician

Member of the Kansas Senate from the 1st district
- In office 1982–1988
- Preceded by: John E. Chandler
- Succeeded by: Don Sallee

Member of the Kansas House of Representatives from the 49th district
- In office 1981–1982
- Succeeded by: Don Sallee

Member of the Kansas House of Representatives from the 48th district
- In office 1975–1980
- Preceded by: George Van Bebber
- Succeeded by: Richard Cameron

Personal details
- Born: Edward Francis Gordon; November 18, 1928 Highland, Kansas
- Died: October 16, 2013 Kansas City, Kansas
- Party: Republican
- Spouse: Virginia Tilton
- Relations: Edward F. Gordon (father)
- Children: 2

Edward Francis Gordon (November 18, 1928 – October 16, 2013) was an American politician who served in the Kansas House of Representatives and Kansas State Senate.

Gordon, who was known by his middle name, was born in Highland, Kansas, the son of Edward F. Gordon, who would eventually enter the state legislature in 1955. It was in Highland where the younger Gordon married his wife, Virginia, in 1948; they spent most of their lives in the town and were married for 65 years. He was appointed to the Kansas House of Representatives in 1975, to fill out the remainder of the term for a seat left vacant by the resignation of George Van Bebber.

Gordon served in the Kansas House until 1982, when the death of John E. Chandler left the 1st senate district open. Gordon was appointed to that seat and won re-election in his own right in 1984. He was succeeded in the Senate by Don Sallee.
