= Georgia State Capitol =

State capitol building of the U.S. state of Georgia

- U.S. National Register of Historic Places
- U.S. National Historic Landmark
- Atlanta Honorary Landmark Building
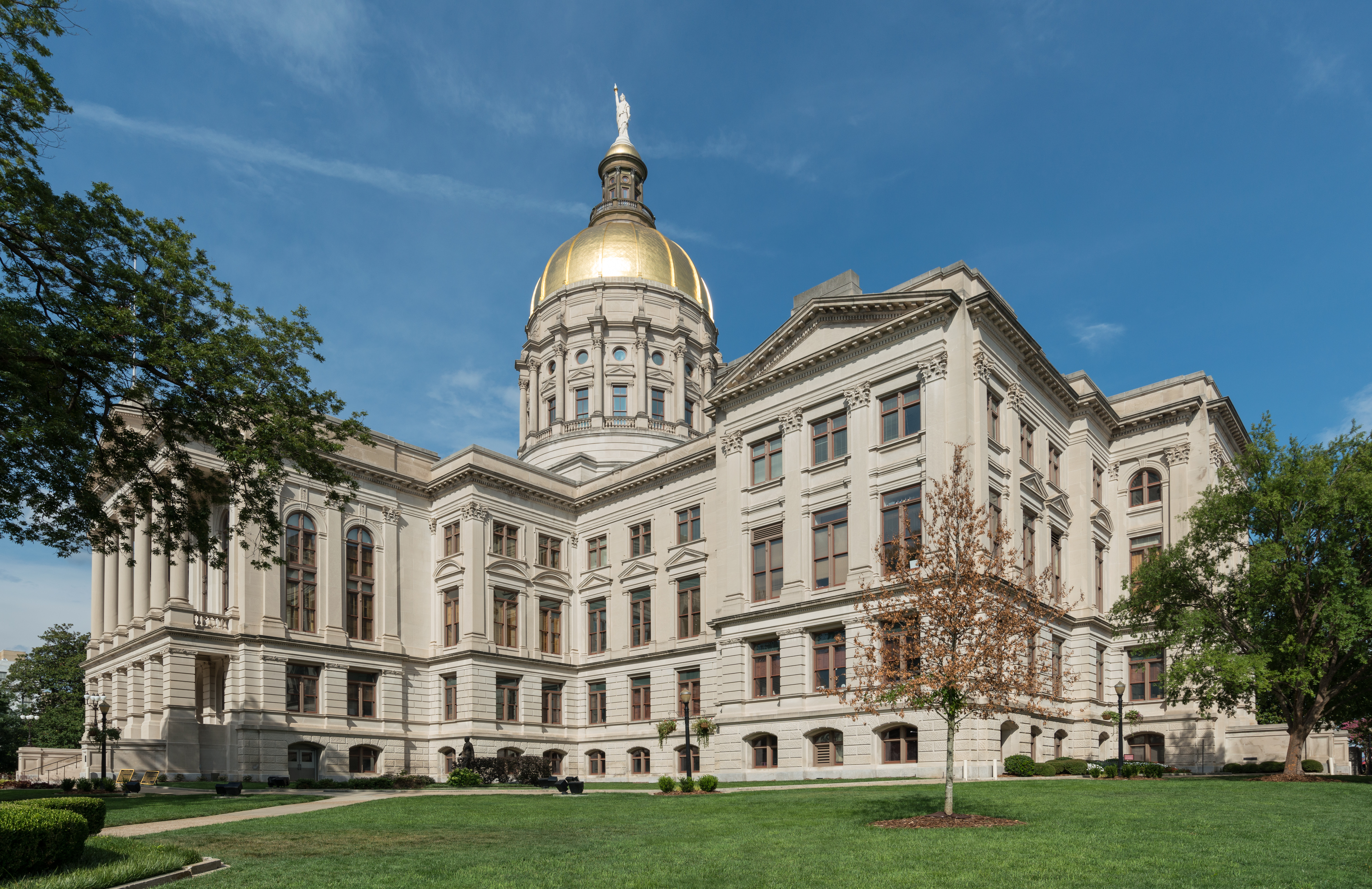
- West side of the Georgia State Capitol

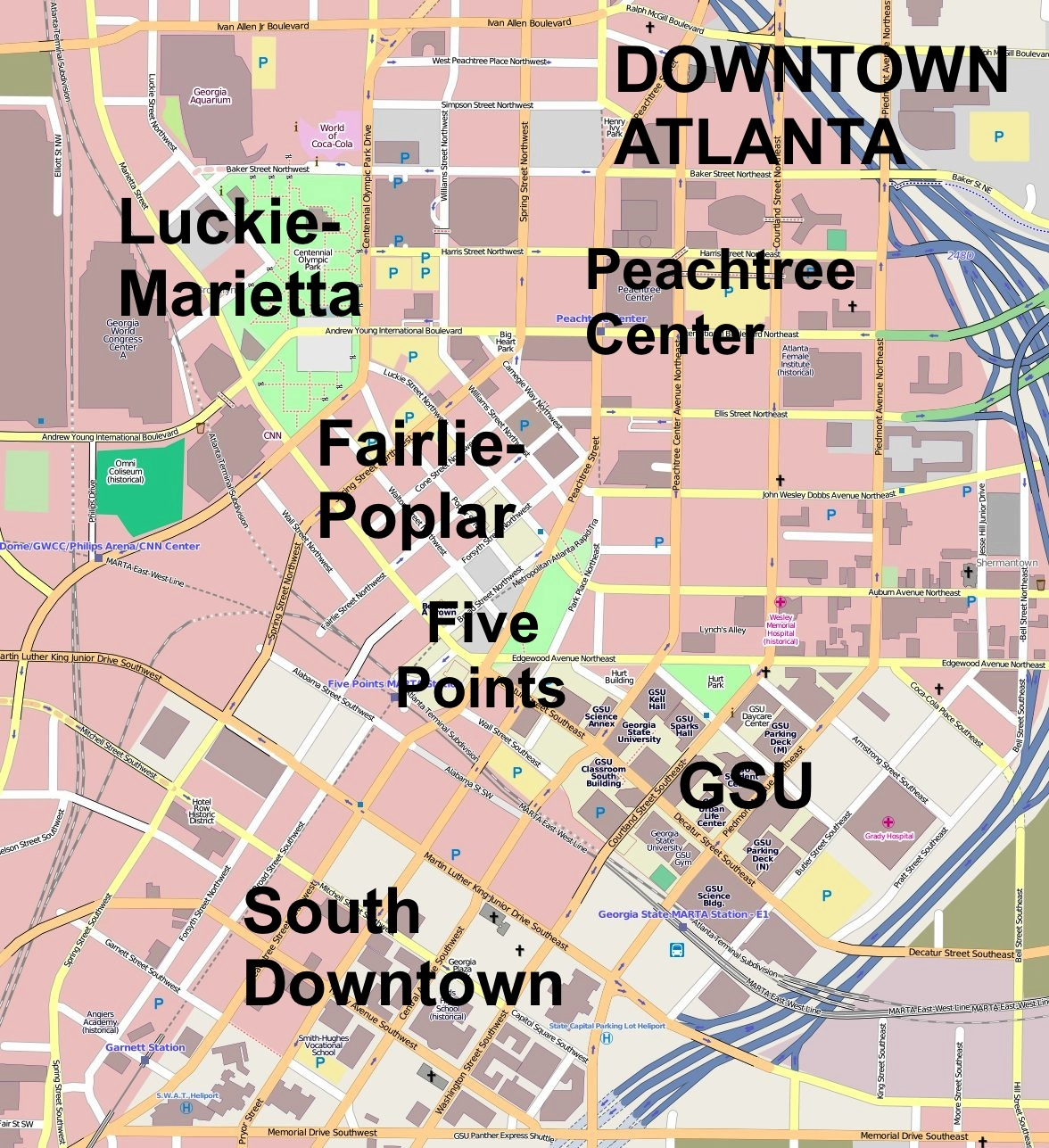
- Location within Downtown Atlanta Location within Atlanta Location within Georgia Location within the United States
- Location: 206 Washington St SW, Atlanta, Georgia
- Coordinates: 33.74905°N 84.38813°W
- Built: 1889; 137 years ago
- Architect: Edbrooke and Burnham
- Architectural style: Renaissance Revival, Classical Revival
- NRHP reference No.: 71001099

Significant dates
- Added to NRHP: December 9, 1971
- Designated NHL: November 7, 1973
- Designated AHLB: 1989

The Georgia State Capitol is an architecturally and historically significant building in Atlanta, Georgia, United States. The building has been named a National Historic Landmark which is listed on the National Register of Historic Places. As the primary office building of Georgia's government, the capitol houses the offices of the governor, lieutenant governor, and secretary of state on the second floor, chambers in which the General Assembly, consisting of the Georgia State Senate and Georgia House of Representatives, meets annually from January to April. The fourth floor houses visitors' galleries overlooking the legislative chambers and a museum located near the rotunda in which a statue of Miss Freedom caps the dome.

== History ==
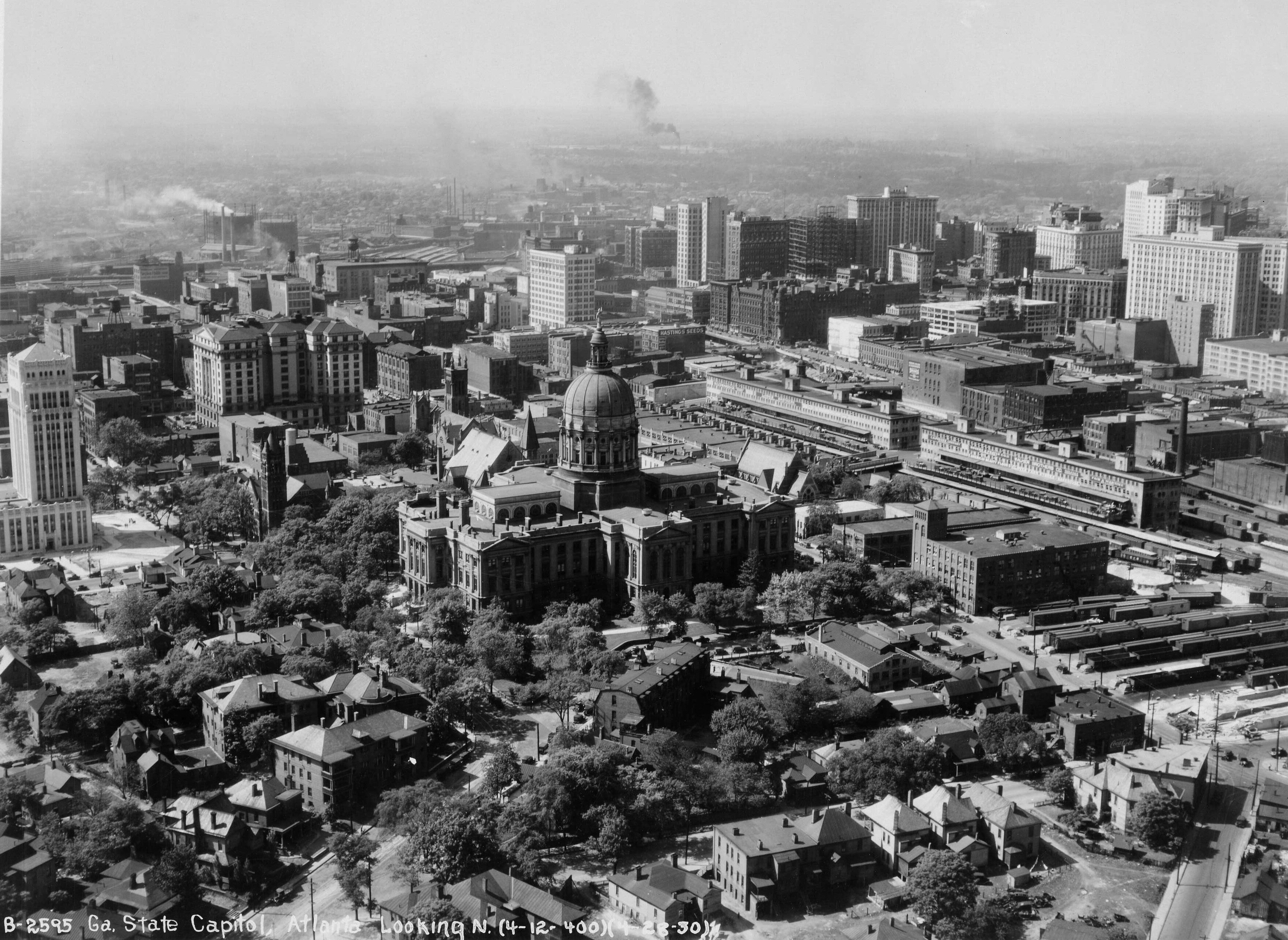
Georgia State Capitol in 1931

The capitol site was occupied previously by the first Atlanta City Hall. To encourage the state government to relocate the capital city to rapidly growing and industrialized Atlanta from rural Milledgeville, the city donated the site. The 1877-79 Constitutional Convention voted in 1877 to permanently move the capital to Atlanta, and in 1879 accepted the city's offer of the five-acre City Hall/County Courthouse tract, which was conveyed to the state in 1880. The first capitol in Louisville no longer stands, while in Augusta and Savannah the legislature met in makeshift facilities, perhaps causing (or caused by) the alternation of those two cities as capital. The legislature also met at other places, including Macon, especially during and just after the Atlanta campaign of the American Civil War, which resulted in the capture and burning of Atlanta.

== Architecture ==
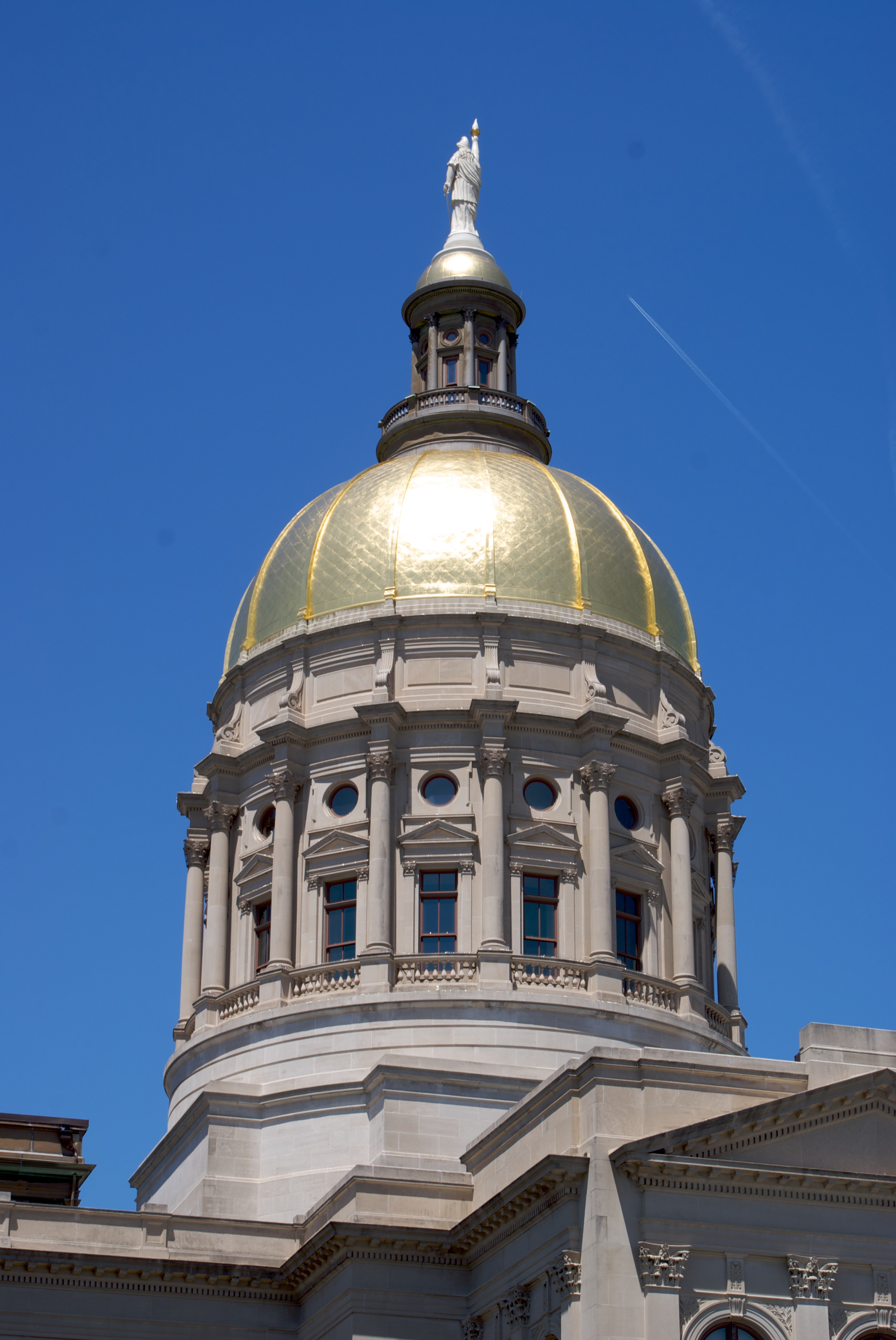
Detail of the dome and statue of Miss Freedom

Like many U.S. state capitols, the Georgia State Capitol is designed to resemble the Neoclassical architectural style of the United States Capitol, in Washington, D.C. Former Confederate general Philip Cook was a member of the commission that oversaw planning and construction of the building. The commission engaged architects Willoughby J. Edbrooke and Franklin Pierce Burnham, of Chicago to design the building and Miles and Horne of Toledo, Ohio for construction. Work completed in March 1889. Sculptor George Crouch executed all the ornamental work on the building.

The Capitol faces west on Washington Street. The façade features a four-story portico, with stone pediment, supported by six Corinthian columns set on large stone piers. Georgia's coat of arms, with two figures on each side, is carved on the pediment. The Capitol's interior represents the 19th-century style of its time. It was among the earliest buildings to have elevators, centralized steam heat, and combination gas and electric lights. Classical pilasters and oak paneling are used throughout the building. The floors of the interior are marble from Pickens County, which still produces marble today.

The open central rotunda is flanked by two wings, each with a grand staircase and three-story atrium crowned by clerestory windows. The Capitol building has undergone frequent renovations to adapt to the growth and change of government. Originally constructed from terra cotta and covered with tin, in a 1958 renovation the present dome was gilded with native gold leaf from near Dahlonega in Lumpkin County, where the first American gold rush occurred during the 1830s. For this reason, legislative business is often referred to as what is happening "under the Gold Dome" by media across the state. The statue Miss Freedom has adorned the dome since the building's opening.

In 1997, the House and Senate chambers were restored to their 1889 appearance with replicated decoration and color schemes. This included the demolition of damaged plaster, the reinstallation of flat plaster at the dome, columns, and walls, and a decorative painting in the House and Senate Chambers.

== Georgia Capitol Museum ==
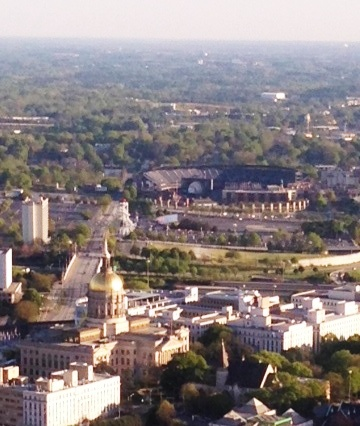
Georgia State Capitol with Turner Field in background

The museum within the Capitol, in existence since 1889, houses extensive collections representing the natural and cultural history of Georgia. Native American artifacts, animals, rocks and minerals, and fossils illustrate the diversity of the collections. Removed during restoration or renovation, most of the collection remains in storage. The portraits of governors, statues of famous Georgians, and historic flags from many wars are displayed throughout the Capitol. The portraits of all governors elected since 1850 are there, except for Rufus Bullock.

The Georgia Capitol Museum is a public education institution housed in the Capitol building under the administration of the University of Georgia Libraries. The museum seeks to preserve and interpret the history of the Georgia Capitol in Atlanta, the functions of the government, and the events that have occurred in the Capitol. To accomplish this, the museum preserves and interprets artifacts relating to the Capitol or associated with the events that have occurred there.

== Liberty Plaza ==
In 2015, the state of Georgia unveiled a large public plaza just east of the Capitol named Liberty Plaza. After its opening, numerous monuments were relocated from other parts of the Capitol grounds to the plaza, including replicas of the Liberty Bell and Statue of Liberty.

== Dimensions ==
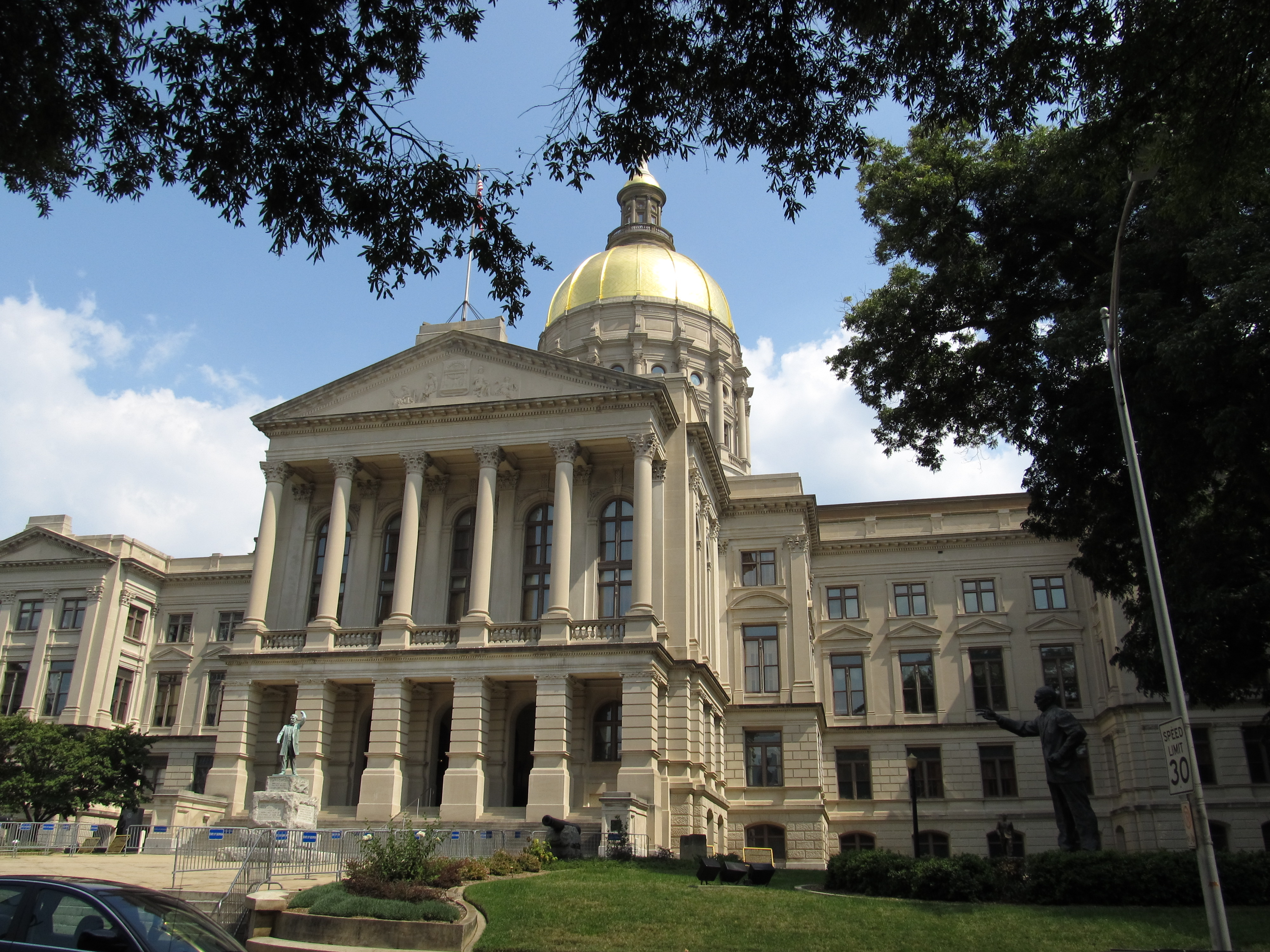
Georgia State Capitol front entrance

- Greatest north–south: 347 feet 9 inches (105.99 meters)
- Greatest central depth: 272 feet 4.5 inches (83.020 meters)
- Second-floor rotunda to ceiling: 187 feet 4 inches (57.10 meters)
- Dome diameter: 75 feet (23 meters)

== Monuments on the Capitol grounds ==
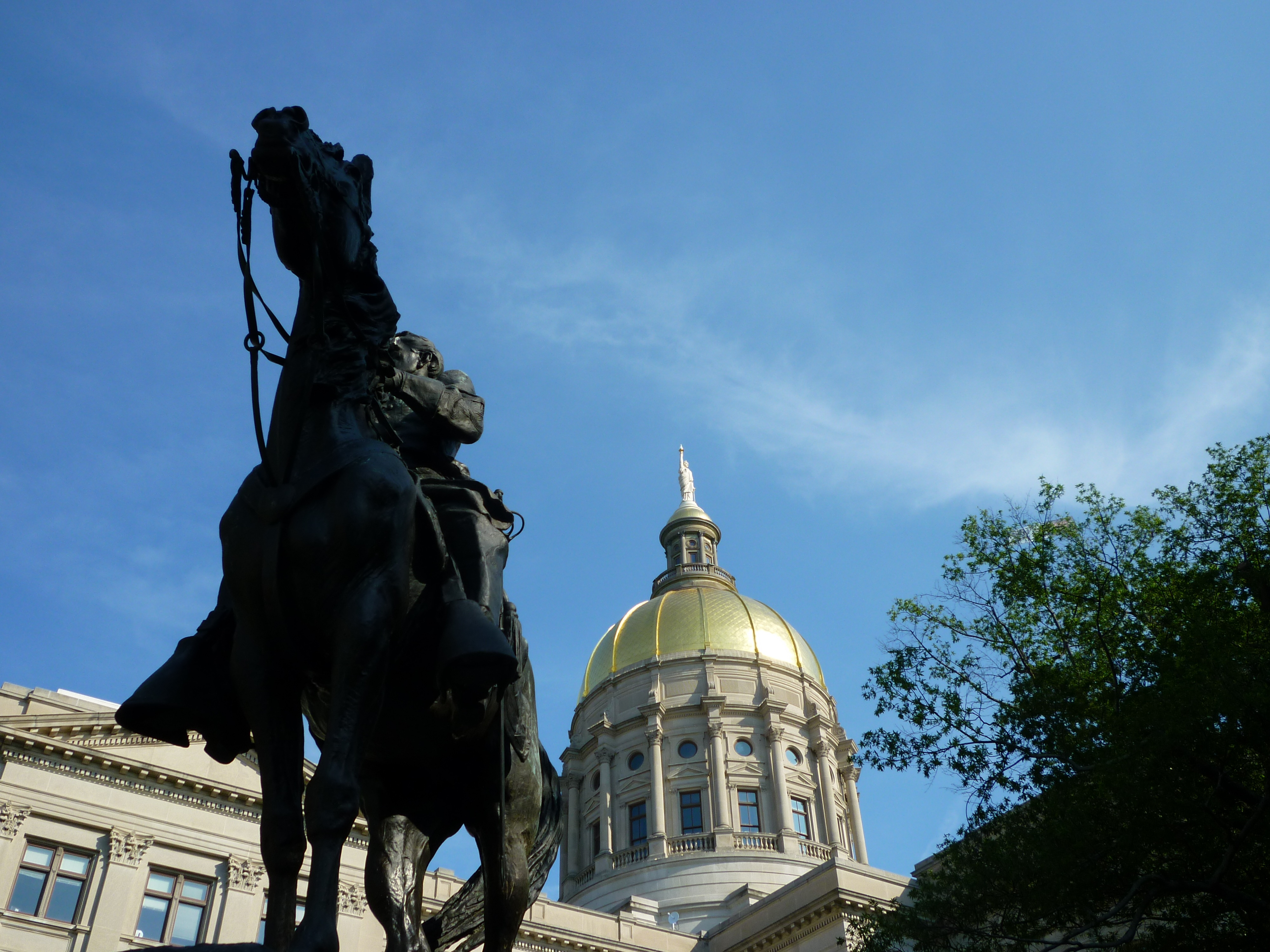
John Brown Gordon statue

Governors

- Equestrian statue of John Brown Gordon (erected in 1907).
- Statue of Elizabeth and Joseph E. Brown (1928)
- Statue of Eugene Talmadge (1949)
- Richard B. Russell (also a U.S. Senator and in the Georgia legislature) (1975)
- Herman Talmadge (also a U.S. Senator) (1990)
- Statue of Jimmy Carter (also a U.S. president and member of the Georgia Senate) (1992)
- Statue of Ellis Arnall (also state Attorney General) (1997)

Other persons

- Plaque and tree honoring William Ambrose Wright, a lieutenant in the Confederate States Army, and Georgia state comptroller for fifty years, as well as insurance commissioner. Erected by the Atlanta Ladies Memorial Association, January 19, 1930.
- Statue of Benjamin Harvey Hill (Confederate Senator, US Senator and US Representative).
- Statue of Martin Luther King Jr. (2017)
- Drinking fountain with a bas-relief of Mary Latimer McLendon, a temperance and women's suffrage activist. Erected in October 1923.

Others

- U.S. Coast Guard Survey History Marker (1874)
- Reproduction of the Liberty Bell (1950)
- Statue of Liberty replica (1951)
- Spanish War Veterans Memorial (1967)
- Flame of Freedom (American Legion) (1969)
- Expelled Because of Color, a 6 feet (1.8 m) bronze statue, by John Thomas Riddle Jr., on the Capitol grounds (1978). It was commissioned in 1976 by the Georgia Legislative Black Caucus, and unveiled in 1978. The statue commemorates the Original 33, the 33 African-American legislators who were expelled from the Georgia legislature in 1868.
- Vietnam War Memorial (1979)
- DOGNY Project Sculpture (2002): 9/11 memorial, across the street from the Capitol

Statue removed

- Statue of Thomas E. Watson (erected in 1932, moved in 2013; Watson was a U.S. Senator and U.S. Representative, and nominee for vice president on the People's Party). In 2013, Governor Nathan Deal ordered the statue moved across the street to Park Plaza.

== Georgia's Old Capitol Museum ==
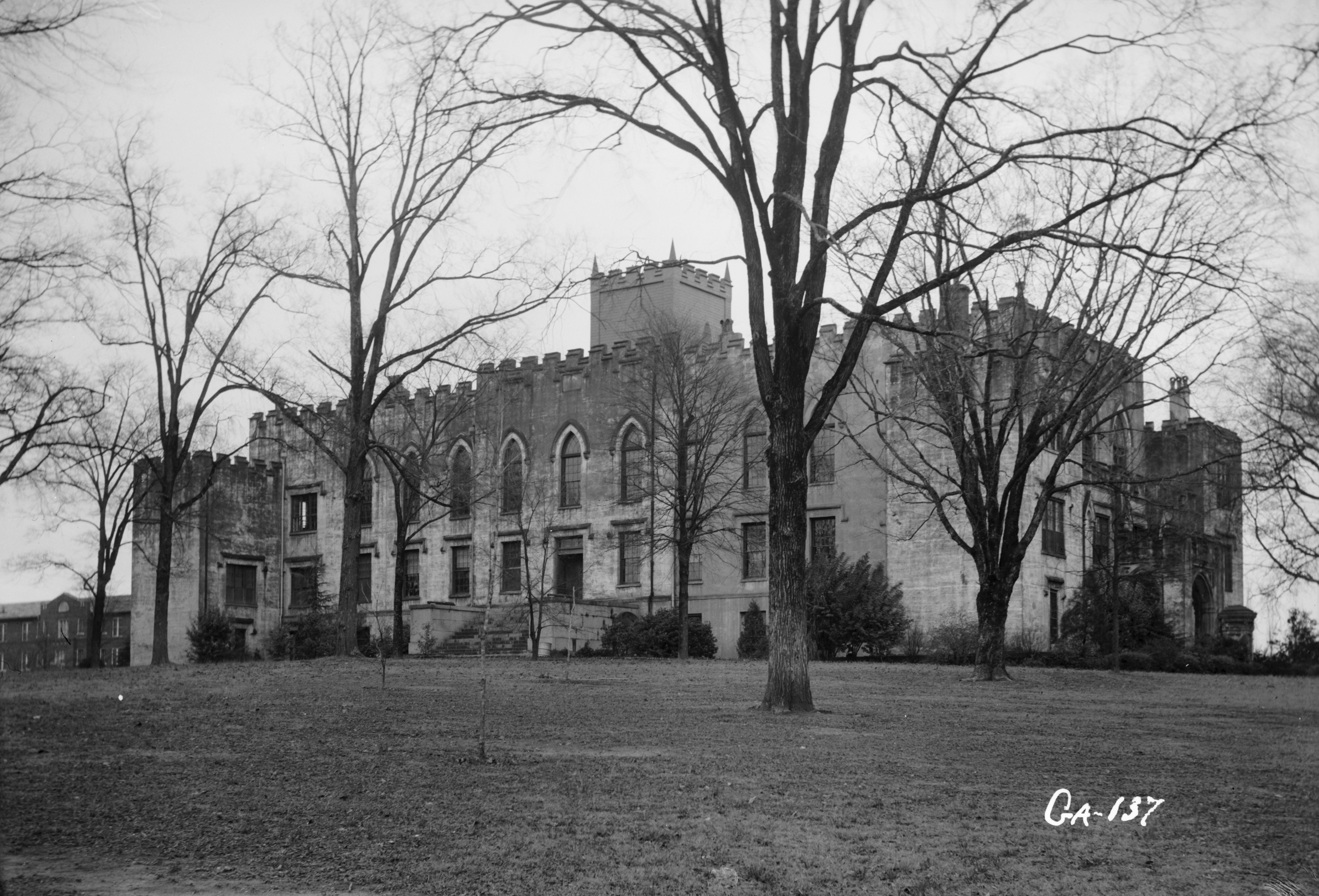
Georgia's second capitol building, 1937

The Old State Capitol is at 201 East Greene Street, Milledgeville, Georgia, and served as state capitol from 1807 until 1867. The building was severely damaged by a fire on March 24, 1941 and was rebuilt in its former design to serve as a part of Georgia Military College. The first floor of the old capitol is open as a museum.

== In popular culture ==
Some parts of filming of the premiere episode of the ninth season of the television show The Walking Dead were filmed around and within the Georgia State Capitol over a period of two days. Other films and television shows include The Falcon and the Winter Soldier, Ride Along 2, Selma, and Kill the Messenger. The original $5,000 license fee to film in the State Capitol was increased in 2014 to $25,000.

== See also ==
- List of Georgia state legislatures
- List of National Historic Landmarks in Georgia (U.S. state)
- National Register of Historic Places listings in Fulton County, Georgia
