= Gordon (surname) =

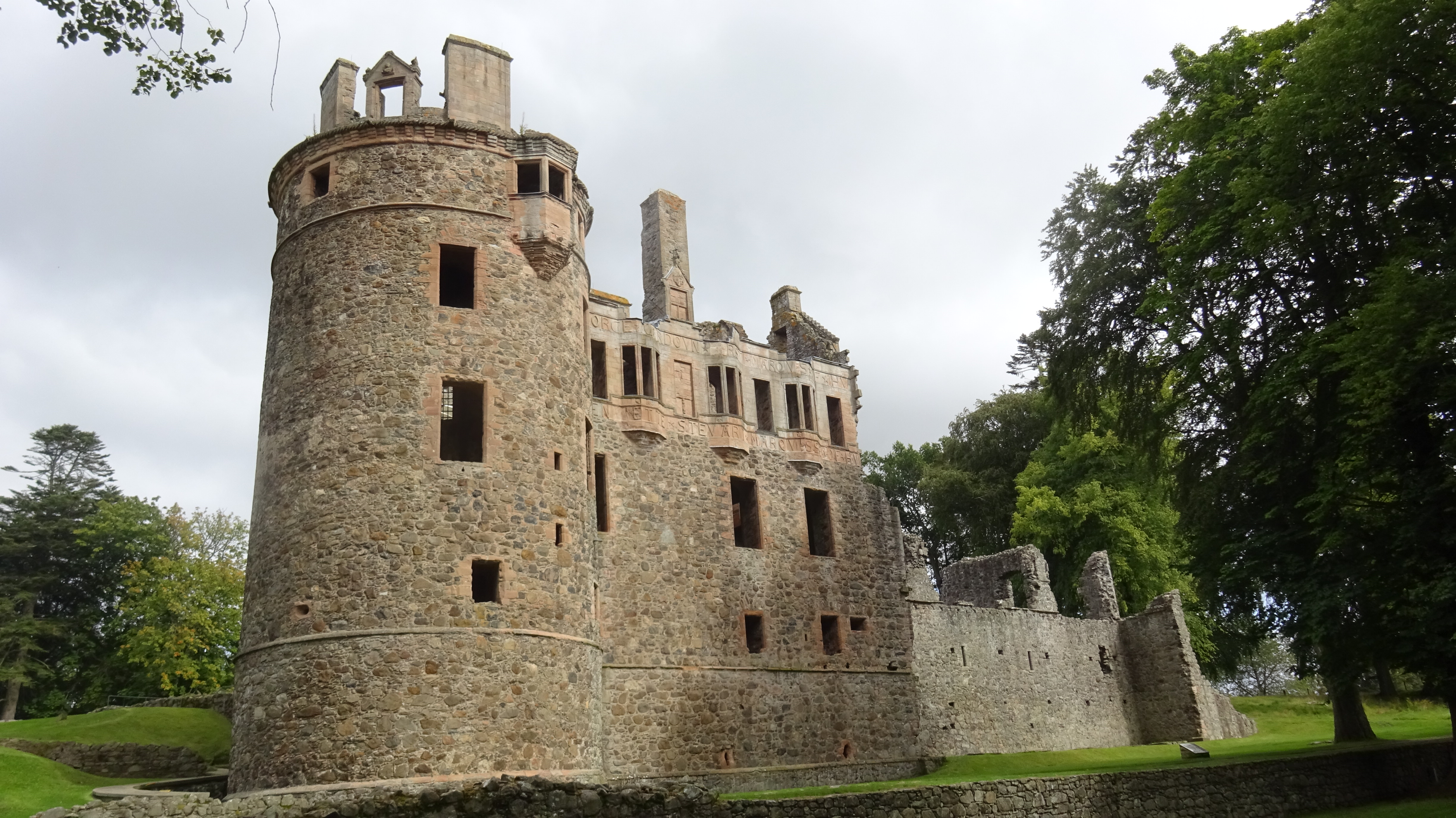
Huntly Castle, the former seat of the Marquess of Huntly, chief of Clan Gordon

Gordon is a surname with multiple origins, including Scottish, English, Irish, Jewish, and Spanish. The masculine given name Gordon is derived from the surname.

== Origins ==
The Scottish surname derives from Gordon in Berwickshire. The earliest recorded bearer of the name was Richard de Gordon, who lived in the 12th century. Later, Robert the Bruce granted the lands of Strathbogie in Aberdeenshire to the Gordons, leading them to move to the north-east of Scotland. The seat of the family was Huntly Castle, named after an ancestral estate in Berwickshire.

The English surname is of French origin, deriving from any of various places in France named Gourdon, most probably the one in Saône-et-Loire. Alternatively, it may be a nickname derived from a diminutive of Old French gourd, meaning "dull" or "boorish".

The Scottish surname was taken to Ireland as early as the 14th century, becoming significantly more common after the Plantation of Ulster. Gordon was also adopted as an anglicisation of various Gaelic names, including Mag Mhuirneacháin (pronounced ~Magournahan) and Mórbhoirneach. In the former case, it was presumably adopted due to the vague similarity in sound, but the reason for its adoption in the latter case is unclear.

As a Jewish surname, Gordon (transliterated גארדאן or גורדון) derives from the city of Grodno in Belarus, formerly a centre of Jewish life. It is common among Litvak Jews.

As a Spanish surname, Gordon derives from any of various places in Spain named Gordón or Gordon, of which there are examples in Salamanca, Galicia, and the Basque Country. Alternatively, it may be a nickname derived from gordo, meaning "fat" (compare Gordillo).

Gordon is also a British Romany surname with origins on the Scottish-English Border; during the 17th and 18th century fearing persecution many Gypsy folk in the North of England and the South of Scotland chose to change their surnames to blend into the local societies they were living within. These Gordons are completely unrelated to other ancestral sources of the name.

== List of people ==
- A. D. Gordon (1856–1922), Russian Zionist
- Aaron Gordon (born 1995), American basketball player
- Abram Gordon (1813–1884), Wisconsin pioneer
- Adam Gordon (disambiguation), multiple people
- Adi Gordon (born 1966), Israeli basketball player
- Adoniram Judson Gordon (1836–1895), pastor in Boston, Massachusetts, and founder of Gordon College
- Agnes Gordon (1906–1967), American bridge player
- Ahavat Hashem Gordon (born 2006), Israeli professional Muay Thai fighter and kickboxer
- Al Gordon (born 1953), comic book creator
- Alan Gordon (1917–2011), Australian politician known as Lin Gordon
- Alan Gordon (actor), British actor
- Alan Gordon (author) (born 1959), American author
- Alan Gordon (historian) (born 1968), Canadian historian
- Alan Gordon (Scottish footballer) (1944–2010), Scottish footballer
- Alan Gordon (soccer), (born 1981), American soccer player
- Alan Lee Gordon (1944–2008), American songwriter
- Alastair Gordon (born 1976), Australian rower, 2000 Sydney Olympics silver medalist
- Albert L. Gordon (1915–2009), American gay rights legal activist
- Alexander Gordon (disambiguation), multiple people
- Aleksandr Gordon (1931–2020), Russian-Soviet director, screenwriter and actor
- Alister Fraser Gordon (1872–1917), British general
- Amelia Elizabeth Roe Gordon (1852–1932), British-born Canadian social reformer
- Anita Gordon (1929–2015), American singer
- Ann Gordon (born 1956), First Lady of North Carolina
- Ann D. Gordon, research professor in the department of history at Rutgers University
- Anna Gordon (1747–1810), ballad collector
- Anna Adams Gordon (1853–1931), American social reformer, songwriter, president of the Woman's Christian Temperance Union
- Anne Gordon (born 1941), Australian cricketer
- Ann Lee (singer) (born 1967), singer and songwriter
- Anthony Gordon (disambiguation), multiple people
- Archibald Ronald McDonald Gordon (1927–2015), Bishop of Portsmouth
- Audrey Gordon, Canadian politician
- Bart Gordon (born 1949), American congressman
- Belle Gordon, American vaudeville performer and boxer
- Ben Gordon (born 1983), British-born American basketball player
- Ben Gordon (footballer, born 1985), Scottish footballer
- B. Frank Gordon (1826–1866), Confederate States Army colonel, acting brigadier general
- Bernard Gordon (disambiguation), multiple people
- Bert I. Gordon (1922–2023), American film director and screenwriter
- Bob Gordon (Canadian intelligence), former Canadian Security Intelligence Service agent
- Bob Gordon (saxophonist) (1928–1955), American jazz saxophonist
- Bobby Gordon (1923–2001), Scottish footballer
- Bobby Gordon (American football) (1935–1990), American football player
- Boyd Gordon (born 1983), Canadian ice hockey player
- Brian Gordon (baseball) (born 1978), American professional baseball pitcher
- Brian Gordon, cartoonist, creator of web comics Fowl Language and Chuck & Beans
- Bridgette Gordon (born 1967), American basketball player
- Bruce Gordon (disambiguation), multiple people
- C. Henry Gordon (1883–1940), American actor
- Cecil Gordon (1941–2012), American NASCAR driver
- Charles George Gordon (1833–1885), British general known as "Chinese Gordon" and "Gordon of Khartoum"
- Charles Gordon (disambiguation), multiple people
- Christopher Gordon (disambiguation), multiple people
- Clarence Gordon (disambiguation), multiple people
- Clemente Gordon (born 1967), American football player
- Colin Gordon (1911–1972), British actor
- Colin Gordon (athlete) (1907–1960), high jumper from British Guiana
- Colton Gordon (born 1998), American baseball pitcher
- Craig Gordon (born 1982), Scottish footballer
- Cyrus H. Gordon (1908–2001), American linguist-semitologist
- Daniel Gordon (disambiguation), multiple people
- David Gordon (disambiguation), multiple people
- Dexter Gordon (1923–1990), American jazz tenor saxophonist and actor
- Dmitry Gordon, Ukrainian journalist and TV presenter
- Donald Gordon (cricketer) (born 1990), English cricketer
- Douglas Gordon (born 1966), Scottish artist
- Douglas C. Gordon (1956–1998), whitewater kayaker
- Douglas Peel Gordon (1892–1948), South Australian politician
- Drew Gordon (1990–2024), American basketball player
- Duke Gordon (1739–1800), 18th-century Scottish librarian
- Ed Gordon (athlete) (1908–1971), American long jumper
- Ed Gordon (journalist) (born 1960), American television journalist
- Edward Gordon (disambiguation), multiple people
- Edythe Mae Gordon (c. 1897 – 1980), American short story writer and poet
- Rabbi Eliezer Gordon (1841–1910), Lithuanian Rosh Yeshiva
- Elizabeth Putnam Gordon (1851–1933), American temperance advocate, author
- Elye Gordon (1907–1989), Soviet Yiddish writer
- Emy Gordon (1841−1909), German writer, translator and Catholic activist
- Eric Gordon (born 1988), American basketball player
- Eric Valentine Gordon (1896–1938), Canadian philologist
- Esmé Gordon (1910–1993), Scottish architect
- F. C. Gordon (1856–1924), Canadian illustrator
- Ferenc Gordon (1893–1971), Hungarian economist and politician
- Francis Gordon (disambiguation), multiple people
- Frank Gordon Jr. (1929–2020), American lawyer and judge
- Frederick Gordon (disambiguation), multiple people
- Fritzi Gordon, Austrian-British bridge player
- Gary Gordon (1960–1993), American soldier and Medal of Honor recipient
- Gary Gordon (bishop) (born 1957), Canadian Roman Catholic bishop
- Gavin Gordon (disambiguation), multiple people
- Geoffrey Gordon (composer) (born 1968), American composer
- George Gordon (disambiguation), multiple people
- Gerald Gordon (disambiguation), multiple people
- Gordon Gordon (1906–2002), half of a team of American crime fiction writers: The Gordons (writers)
- Hannah Gordon (born 1941), Scottish actress
- Harry Gordon (entertainer) (1893–1957), Scottish entertainer, comedian and impressionist
- Harry Gordon (footballer) (1931–2014), Scottish footballer
- Harry L. Gordon (1860–1921), American politician in Ohio
- Heather Gordon (born 1967), American contemporary visual artist
- Henry Gordon (preacher) (1816–1898), American
- C. Henry Gordon (1883–1940), American actor
- Henry Charles Gordon (1925–1996), American astronaut
- Henry Gordon (magician) (1920–2009), Canadian magician and writer
- Herbert Gordon (cricketer) (1898−1965), English cricketer
- Herbert Gordon (footballer) (1952–2013), Jamaican footballer
- Hilda May Gordon (1874–1972), British painter
- Honi Gordon, vocalist
- Ian Gordon (footballer) (born 1933), former Australian rules footballer
- Ian Gordon (general) (born 1952), Deputy Chief of Army and Commander of UNTSO
- Ian Gordon (historian) (born 1964), professor of US history at the National University of Singapore
- Ian Gordon (ice hockey) (born 1975), German hockey player
- Ida Gordon, English philologist, wife of E. V. Gordon
- Isabella Gordon (1901–1988), British biological scientist
- James Gordon (disambiguation), multiple people
- Janet Hill Gordon (1915–1990), New York politician
- Jano Gordon (born 2004), Argentine footballer
- Javin Gordon (born 2007), American football player
- Jay Gordon (born 1967), American musician
- Jeff Gordon (born 1971), American NASCAR driver
- Jeffrey D. Gordon, Pentagon spokesman
- Jimmie Gordon, American blues pianist, singer, and songwriter
- Joe Gordon (1915–1978), American baseball player and manager
- Joel Gordon, Canadian actor and filmmaker
- Joel Gordon (American football), American football coach and former player
- John Gordon (disambiguation), multiple people
- Johnette Gordon-Weaver, American historian
- Josephine Gordon (born 1993), British jockey
- Joyce Gordon (1929–2020), American actress and union representative
- Judah Leib Gordon (1830–1892), Hebrew poet
- Judy Gordon (1948–2020), Canadian politician
- Julia Gordon (mathematician), Canadian mathematician
- Juliette Gordon Low (1860–1927), founder of the Girl Scouts of the USA
- Karl Gordon, British DJ and producer
- Ken Gordon (Trinidadian politician) (born in 1930), Trinidadian businessman and former politician
- Ken Gordon (Colorado politician), Colorado congressman
- Kim Gordon, American musician, member of Sonic Youth
- Kyle Gordon (born 1992), American comedian and musician
- Kyler Gordon (born 1999), American football player
- L. C. Gordon (born 1937), American basketball player and coach
- Larry Gordon (disambiguation), multiple people
- Lawrence Gordon (disambiguation), multiple people
- Lee Gordon (1902–1946), American musician
- Lee Gordon (promoter) (1923–1963), American businessman and rock and roll promoter
- Lennox Gordon (born 1978), American football player
- Leo Gordon (1922–2000), American film and television character actor
- Leon Gordon (1889–1943), Russian-born poet
- Leonard A. Gordon is a historian of South Asia, especially of Bengal
- Lewis Gordon (born 1962), American philosopher
- Lewis Gordon, 3rd Marquess of Huntly (c. 1626 – 1653)
- Lewis Gordon (civil engineer) (1815–1876)
- Lewis Gordon (Jacobite) (1724–1754)
- Lincoln Gordon (1913–2009), president of Johns Hopkins University, and U.S. Ambassador to Brazil
- Lindsay Gordon (1892–1940), Canadian air marshal
- Lucy Gordon (disambiguation), multiple people
- Manya Gordon (1882–1945), American historian
- Margaret Gordon (illustrator) (1939–1989), British artist
- Margaret Maria Gordon (1823–1907), Scottish author
- Marilyn Gordon, Trinidad and Tobago politician
- Marina Gordon (1917–2013), American singer
- Marjory Gordon (1931–2015), American nurse
- Marjorie Gordon Smart (1911–1982) British, Canadian and Australian diplomat and a founding college principal in Australia.
- Marc Gordon (1935–2010), American record producer and music executive
- Mark Gordon (producer) (born 1956), American film and television producer
- Mark Gordon (Wyoming politician) (born 1957), American politician
- Mary Gordon (disambiguation), multiple people
- Maxine Gordon, British actress
- Melvin Gordon (born 1993), American football player
- Merritt J. Gordon (1859–1925), associate justice of the Washington Supreme Court
- Mervyn Gordon (1872–1953), British microbiologist
- Michael Gordon (disambiguation), multiple people
- Mikalah Gordon, (born 1988), American Idol 4 contestant
- Mildred Gordon (1912–1979), half of a team of American crime fiction writers: The Gordons (writers)
- Mildred Gordon (politician) (1923–2016), British politician
- Nachi Gordon, American entrepreneur
- Nancy Gordon, American economist and statistician
- Nathan Gordon (footballer) (born 1990), Australian rules footballer
- Nathan Green Gordon (1916–2008), American lawyer, politician, and naval aviator
- Nathan H. Gordon (1872–1938), motion picture executive
- Nathaniel Gordon (1826–1862), American slave trader
- Nellie Kinzie Gordon (1835–1917), American writer
- Nick Gordon (born 1995), American baseball player
- Noah Gordon (disambiguation), multiple people
- Norman Gordon (1911–2014), South African cricketer
- Oliver Gordon (disambiguation), multiple people
- Paige Gordon (born 1973), Canadian diver
- Pamela Gordon (disambiguation), multiple people
- Patrick Gordon (disambiguation), multiple people
- Peter Gordon (disambiguation), multiple people
- Phil Gordon (disambiguation), multiple people
- Philip H. Gordon (born 1962), American diplomat
- Powhatan Gordon (1802–1879), American politician
- Richard Gordon (disambiguation), multiple people
- R. H. Gordon (1844–1917), American politician
- Ricky Ian Gordon (born 1956), US composer
- Robby Gordon (born 1969), NASCAR driver
- Robert Gordon (disambiguation), multiple people
- Roderick Gordon (born 1960), children's book author
- Rodney Gordon (1933–2008), British architect
- Ron Gordon, American entrepreneur and former president of Atari.
- Rosco Gordon (1928–2002), American blues singer and pianist
- Roy Gordon, multiple people
- Rupert Montgomery Gordon (1898–1961), British parasitologist
- Ruth Gordon (1896–1985), actress
- Samuel Y. Gordon (1861–1940), Minnesota legislator and the Lieutenant Governor of Minnesota
- Sandy Grant Gordon (1933–2020), Scottish distiller
- Shahar Gordon (born 1980), Israeli basketball player
- Shaul Gordon (born 1994), Canadian-Israeli Olympic sabre fencer
- Sheila Gordon (1927–2013), American writer
- Sid Gordon (1917–1975), American major league baseball All Star player
- Sidney Gordon (businessman) (1917–2007), Scottish businessman
- Stuart Gordon (1947–2020), American director
- Stuart Gordon (musician), musician with The Korgis
- Stephen J. Gordon (born 1986), English chess grandmaster
- Steve Gordon (cricketer) (born 1967), Cayman Islands cricketer
- Steve Gordon (director) (1938–1982), American film and television director (Arthur)
- Steve Gordon (rugby league) (born 1986), rugby league footballer
- Steven E. Gordon (born 1960), director, character designer and animator
- Stomp Gordon (1926–1958), American jump blues pianist and singer
- Sue Gordon (born 1943), magistrate
- Susan Gordon (1949–2011), child actress
- Thomas Gordon (disambiguation), multiple people
- Tom Gordon (born 1967), American baseball player
- Trevor Gordon (1948–2013), British Australian singer, songwriter and musician
- Veronica Lucy Gordon, a South Sudanese journalist
- Victoria Gordon, Australian pharmaceutical researcher
- Walter Gordon (1942–2012), African-American filmmaker known as Jamaa Fanaka
- Walter Gordon (physicist) (1893–1939), physicist active in the 1920s
- Walter Gordon (soldier, born 1920) (1920–1997), American World War II veteran
- Walter A. Gordon (1894–1976), African-American political figure and American football player for the University of California
- Walter Henry Gordon (1863–1924), United States Army General
- Walter L. Gordon (1906–1987), Canadian politician and cabinet minister
- Wayne Gordon (disambiguation), multiple people
- William Gordon (disambiguation), multiple people
- Willy Gordon (1918–2003), Swedish sculptor
- Yekutiel Gordon, disciple of Rabbi Moshe Chaim Luzzatto
- Zachary Gordon (born 1998), American child actor

== List of people with a related name ==
- Sir Alexander Cumming-Gordon, 1st Baronet (1749–1806), Scottish politician
- Catherine Rose Gordon-Cumming (born 1952), Katie Fforde, British romance novelist
- Constance Gordon-Cumming (1837–1924), Scottish travel writer and painter
- Roualeyn George Gordon-Cumming (1820–1866), Scottish traveller and sportsman, known as the "lion hunter"
- Sir William Gordon-Cumming, 2nd Baronet (1787–1854), Scottish Member of Parliament for Elgin Burghs 1831–1832
- Sir William Gordon-Cumming, 4th Baronet (1848–1930), Scottish soldier and adventurer, central figure in the Royal Baccarat Scandal
- Sir Alexander Gordon-Lennox (Royal Navy officer) (1911–1987), admiral of the Royal Navy
- Lord Alexander Gordon-Lennox (1825–1892), British Conservative politician
- Major Lord Bernard Charles Gordon-Lennox (1878–1914), British soldier
- Major-General Bernard Charles Gordon-Lennox (1932–2017), commandant of the British Sector in Berlin
- Lord George Charles Gordon-Lennox (1829–1877), British Conservative politician
- Lieutenant-General Sir George Charles Gordon-Lennox (1908–1988), British soldier
- Hilda Madeline Gordon-Lennox, Duchess of Richmond (1872–1971), first chairman of the National Gardens Scheme
- Ivy Gordon-Lennox (1887–1982), Ivy Cavendish-Bentinck, Duchess of Portland, GBE
- Lord Nicholas Gordon-Lennox (1931–2004), British diplomat
- Lord Walter Charles Gordon-Lennox (1865–1922), British Conservative Party politician
- Joseph Gordon-Levitt (born 1981), American actor

== List of nobility ==
- Duke of Gordon, created once in the Peerage of Scotland, and again in the Peerage of the United Kingdom

Dukes of Aubigny

- Charles Gordon-Lennox, 5th Duke of Richmond, 5th Duke of Lennox, Duke of Aubigny (1791–1860)
- Charles Henry Gordon-Lennox, 6th Duke of Richmond, 6th Duke of Lennox, Duke of Aubigny, 1st Duke of Gordon (1818–1903)
- Charles Henry Gordon-Lennox, 7th Duke of Richmond, 7th Duke of Lennox, Duke of Aubigny, 2nd Duke of Gordon (1845–1928)
- Charles Henry Gordon-Lennox, 8th Duke of Richmond, 8th Duke of Lennox, Duke of Aubigny, 3rd Duke of Gordon (1870–1935)
- Frederick Charles Gordon-Lennox, 9th Duke of Richmond, 9th Duke of Lennox, Duke of Aubigny, 4th Duke of Gordon (1904–1989)
- Charles Henry Gordon-Lennox, 10th Duke of Richmond, 10th Duke of Lennox, Duke of Aubigny, 5th Duke of Gordon (1929–2017)

Earls and Marquesses of Huntly

- Alexander Gordon, 1st Earl of Huntly
- George Gordon, 2nd Earl of Huntly
- Alexander Gordon, 3rd Earl of Huntly
- George Gordon, 4th Earl of Huntly (1514–1562)
- George Gordon, 5th Earl of Huntly
- George Gordon, 1st Marquess and 6th Earl of Huntly (1562–1636)
- George Gordon, 2nd Marquess of Huntly (1592–1649)
- Lewis Gordon, 3rd Marquess of Huntly (c. 1626 – 1653)
- George Gordon, 4th Marquess of Huntly (1649–1716) (1st Duke of Gordon)
- George Gordon, 9th Marquess of Huntly (1761–1853)
- Charles Gordon, 10th Marquess of Huntly (1792–1863)
- Charles Gordon, 11th Marquess of Huntly (1847–1937)
- Douglas Gordon, 12th Marquess of Huntly (1908–1987)
- Granville Charles Gomer Gordon, 13th Marquess of Huntly (born 1944)

Earls and Marquesses of Aberdeen

- George Gordon, 1st Earl of Aberdeen (1637–1720)
- William Gordon, 2nd Earl of Aberdeen (1679–1745)
- George Gordon, 3rd Earl of Aberdeen (1722–1801)
- George Hamilton-Gordon, 4th Earl of Aberdeen (1784–1860)
- George Hamilton-Gordon, 5th Earl of Aberdeen (1816–1864)
- George Hamilton-Gordon, 6th Earl of Aberdeen (1841–1870)
- John Campbell Hamilton-Gordon, 7th Earl of Aberdeen (1847–1934), 1st Marquess of Aberdeen and Temair (1847–1934)
- George Gordon, 2nd Marquess of Aberdeen and Temair (1879–1965)
- Dudley Gladstone Gordon, 3rd Marquess of Aberdeen and Temair (1883–1972)
- David George Ian Alexander Gordon, 4th Marquess of Aberdeen and Temair (1908–1974)
- Archibald Victor Dudley Gordon, 5th Marquess of Aberdeen and Temair (1913–1984)
- Alastair Ninian John Gordon, 6th Marquess of Aberdeen and Temair (1920–2002)
- Alexander George Gordon, 7th Marquess of Aberdeen and Temair (1955–2020)

Earls of Aboyne

- Charles Gordon, 1st Earl of Aboyne (died 1681)
- Charles Gordon, 2nd Earl of Aboyne (died 1702)
- John Gordon, 3rd Earl of Aboyne (died 1732)
- Charles Gordon, 4th Earl of Aboyne (1728–1795)
- George Gordon, 5th Earl of Aboyne (1761–1853) (succeeded as 9th Marquess of Huntly in 1836)

Viscounts of Kenmure

- John Gordon, 1st Viscount of Kenmure (1599–1634)
- John Gordon, 2nd Viscount of Kenmure (died 1639)
- John Gordon, 3rd Viscount of Kenmure (died 1643)
- Robert Gordon, 4th Viscount of Kenmure (died 1663)
- Alexander Gordon, 5th Viscount of Kenmure (died 1698)
- William Gordon, 6th Viscount of Kenmure (died 1715) (attainted 1715)

Descent of titles during attainder:

- Robert Gordon, 7th Viscount of Kenmure (1714–1741)
- John Gordon, 8th Viscount of Kenmure (1713–1769)
- William Gordon, 9th Viscount of Kenmure (c. 1748 – 1772)
- John Gordon, 10th Viscount of Kenmure (1750–1840) (restored 1824)
- Adam Gordon, 11th Viscount of Kenmure (died 1847)

Viscount of Melgum

- John Gordon, 1st Viscount of Melgum (died 1630)

Viscount Gordon

Spanish Gordons

- Mauricio González-Gordon y Diez (1923–2013), Spanish sherry maker and conservationist, descendant of Scottish Gordons

== Fictional characters ==
- Allan Gordon, protagonist of The Surpassing Adventures of Allan Gordon by James Hogg
- James "Jim" Gordon, commissioner of Gotham City in Batman
- Barbara Gordon, known also as Batgirl and Oracle, in the Batman franchise
- David "Gordo" Gordon in Lizzie McGuire
- Flash Gordon, lead character of the Alex Raymond comic strip of the same name, and the movie, television, and comic books based on the comic strip
- Sir Frank Gordon character in the 1980s British sitcom Yes Minister
- Lawrence Gordon, fictional character in the first of the Saw franchise
- Tony Gordon, fictional character on the television series Coronation Street
