= Henry Gordon =

Henry Gordon may refer to:

== People ==
- Henry Gordon (preacher) (1816–1898), American preacher and church planter
- C. Henry Gordon (1883–1940), American actor
- Harry Gordon (entertainer) (1893–1957), British performer
- Henry Charles Gordon (1925–1996), American astronaut
- Henry Gordon (magician) (1919–2009), Canadian magician and writer
- Henry Percy Gordon (1806–1876), barrister and artist

== Name ==
- Henry Gordon (given name)

== See also ==
- Harry Gordon (disambiguation)
