= Harry Gordon =

Harry Gordon may refer to:

- Harry L. Gordon (1860–1921), American politician in Ohio
- Harry Gordon (entertainer) (1893–1957), Scottish entertainer, comedian and impressionist
- Harry Gordon (journalist) (1925–2015), Australian journalist and Olympic historian
- Harry Gordon (footballer) (1931–2014), Scottish footballer

== See also ==
- Henry Gordon (disambiguation)
- Harold Gordon (disambiguation)
