= William Gordon =

William Gordon may refer to:

== Law and politics ==
=== United Kingdom ===
- William Gordon, 6th Viscount of Kenmure (c. 1672–1716), Scottish Jacobite politician
- William Gordon, 2nd Earl of Aberdeen (1679–1746), Scottish peer, Tory politician and Jacobite
- William Gordon, Lord Strathnaver (1683–1720), Scottish politician, MP for Tain Burghs
- Sir William Gordon, 1st Baronet (died 1742), Scottish politician, MP for Sutherland, Cromartyshire and Nairnshire
- Sir William Gordon (diplomat) (1726–1798), British diplomat and politician, MP for Portsmouth
- William Gordon (Rochester MP) (c. 1735–1776), English politician, MP for Rochester
- Lord William Gordon (1744–1823), Scottish politician, MP for Elginshire, Inverness-shire, and Horsham
- William Duff-Gordon (1772–1823), known as William Gordon until 1815, Scottish politician
- William Gordon (Chelsea MP) (1818–1894), British MP for Chelsea
- William McD. Gordon (1899–1950), Scottish provost of Peterhead

=== United States ===
- William Gordon (New Hampshire politician) (1763–1802), U.S. representative from New Hampshire
- William F. Gordon (1787–1858), U.S. representative from Virginia
- William Washington Gordon (1796–1842), American politician and railroad executive
- William Osceola Gordon (1837–1914), American judge
- William D. Gordon (politician) (1858–1917), American politician and attorney in Michigan
- William Gordon (Ohio politician) (1862–1942), U.S. representative from Ohio

=== Elsewhere ===
- William Gordon (Australian politician) (1862–1943), Australian politician
- Billy Gordon (1972/1973–2022), Australian politician

== Military ==
- William Gordon (Royal Navy officer, born 1705) (1705–1769), Scottish Royal Navy commander
- William Gordon (British Army officer, born 1736) (1736–1816), British general
- William Gordon (Royal Navy officer, born 1784) (1784–1858), Scottish naval commander
- William Gordon (British Army officer, born 1814) (1814–1870), British general
- William Washington Gordon II (1834–1912), Confederate officer and U.S. Army general
- William James Gordon (1864–1922), West Indian soldier in the British army
- William Eagleson Gordon (1866–1941), Scottish officer in the British army

== Religion ==
- William Gordon of Earlston (1614–1679), Scottish landowner and Covenanter
- William Gordon (bishop of Aberdeen) (died 1577), Scottish prelate
- William Gordon (bishop of Leeds) (1831–1911), English prelate of the Roman Catholic Church
- William Gordon (bishop of Alaska) (1918–1994), American Episcopal bishop

== Science and medicine ==
- William Gordon (physician) (1801–1849), English physician
- William Thomas Gordon (1884–1950), British palaeontologist and palaeobotanist
- William E. Gordon (1918–2010), American physicist and astronomer
- William J. J. Gordon (1919–2003), American inventor and psychologist

== Others ==
- William Deuchar Gordon (1871–1951), Australian pastoralist
- William D. Gordon (actor) (1918–1991), American actor, writer and director
- William Francis Gordon (1820–1901), English coal-master and railway director
- William Robert Gordon (1872–1955), Northern Irish landscape and portrait painter
- Willy Gordon (1918–2003), Swedish sculptor and artist

== See also ==
- William Gordon-Cumming (disambiguation)
- Billi Gordon (1954–2018), American author, television writer, neuroscientist, actor and model
