= Herbert Gordon =

Herbert Gordon may refer to:

- Herbert Gordon (cricketer) (1898−1965), English cricketer
- Herbert Gordon (footballer) (1952−2013), Jamaican footballer

== See also ==
- Gordon Herbert (born 1959), Canadian-born Finnish basketball coach and player
- H. Gordon Tidey (1879-1971), English railway photographer
