= Admiral Patterson =

Admiral Patterson may refer to:

- Julian Patterson (1884–1972), British Royal Navy rear admiral
- Thomas H. Patterson (1820–1889), U.S. Navy rear admiral
- Wilfrid Patterson (1893–1954), British Royal Navy admiral
