= List of provosts of Peterhead =

The provost of Peterhead was the head of the Peterhead burgh council in Scotland. Provosts were elected by the council and served not only as the chairman of that body, but as a figurehead for the entire town. They were equivalent in many ways to the institution of mayor. The council was abolished in 1975.

Each of the 32 Scottish local authorities elects a convener or provost, but it is only the four main cities, Glasgow, Edinburgh, Aberdeen and Dundee that have a lord provost. This is enshrined in the Local Government etc. (Scotland) Act 1994.

The Provost of Peterhead painted by Edward Burton after Sir John Watson-Gordon, is of Roderick Grey, the portrait now being in the Scottish National Gallery.

== Provosts ==
- 1833–1834: George Arbuthnot of Invernettie, cotton manufacturer
- 1834–1843: Thomas Arbuthnot of Meethill, shipowner
- 1843–1857: Roderick Grey, WS, solicitor
- 1857–1860: Alexander Anderson, shipowner
- 1860–1885: William Alexander of Whitehill, solicitor/bank agent
- 1885–1888: John Henderson Will of Downiehills, fish curer
- 1888–1899: John Smith, manufacturer
- 1899–1918: William Hutchison Leask, commission agent and drifter owner
- 1918–1927: James Hutchison Catto, commission agent and herring exporter
- 1927–1930: James Milne, coal merchant
- 1930–1936: John B Dickie, timber merchant
- 1936–1940: Max J. L. Schultze, herring exporter
- 1940–1946: Robert S. Dingwall, gents outfitter
- 1946–1950: William McD. Gordon, cabinet maker
- 1950–1956: John A. Dickie, timber merchant
- 1956–1965: Robert Forman, company director, boat owner
- 1965–1971: Edward A. Duncan, grocer
- 1971–1975: Thomas L. Smith, headmaster
