= Robert Gordon =

Robert Gordon may refer to:

== Entertainment ==
- Robert Gordon (actor, born 1895) (1895–1971), silent-film actor
- Robert Gordon (director, born 1913) (1913–1990), American director
- Robert Gordon (singer) (1947–2022), American rockabilly singer
- Robert Gordon (screenwriter), American screenwriter
- Robert Gordon (writer and filmmaker), American author and director
- Robert Gordon, British musician and co-founder of Warp Records

== Military ==
- Robert Gordon (RAF officer) (1882–1954), British officer
- Robert MacIntyre Gordon (1899–1983), Scottish World War I flying ace
- Robert Gordon (British Army officer) (born 1950), British general

== Politics ==
- Sir Robert Gordon, 1st Baronet (1580–1656), Scottish courtier and historian
- Sir Robert Gordon, 3rd Baronet (1647–1704), Scottish courtier and politician
- Sir Robert Gordon, 4th Baronet (1696–1772), Scottish landowner and politician
- Robert Gordon (MP) (1786–1864), British member of parliament for Windsor and Cricklade
- Robert Gordon (diplomat) (1791–1847), British diplomat
- Robert B. Gordon (1855–1923), U.S. representative from Ohio
- Robert Gordon (Vermont politician) (1865–1921), mayor of Barre 1916–1917
- Robert C. F. Gordon (1920–2001), American diplomat
- Robert M. Gordon (politician) (born 1950), New Jersey state senator
- Robert Gordon (ambassador) (born 1952), British ambassador to Burma and to Vietnam

== Sports ==
- Robert Gordon (rower) (1830–1914), English rower and clergyman
- Robert Gordon (cricketer) (1889–1914), New Zealand cricketer
- Robert Gordon (English footballer) (1917–1940), British footballer and soldier
- Robert Gordon (gridiron football) (born 1968), American football player
- Robert Gordon (Scottish footballer), Scottish footballer for Dumbarton during the 1900s
- Rob Gordon (born 1975), New Zealand rugby player
- Rob Gordon (curler) (born 1995), Canadian curler
- Robb Gordon (born 1976), Canadian hockey player
- Robby Gordon (born 1969), American racing driver

== Professors ==
- R. K. Gordon (1887–1973), medieval literature professor at University of Alberta
- Robert Winslow Gordon (1888–1961), folklore professor at Berkeley
- Robert Aaron Gordon (1908–1978), economics professor at Berkeley
- Robert A. Gordon (born 1932), sociology professor at Johns Hopkins
- Robert J. Gordon (born 1940), economics professor at Northwestern
- Robert P. Gordon (born 1945), professor of Hebrew at Cambridge
- Robert Gordon (academic) (born 1966), Italian studies professor at Cambridge

== Other ==
- Robert Gordon of Lochinvar (died 1628) Scottish landowner and promoter of colonies in Canada
- Robert Gordon of Straloch (1580–1661), Scottish cartographer
- Robert Gordon (philanthropist) (1668–1731), Scottish trader and philanthropist
- Robert Jacob Gordon (1743–1795), Dutch explorer of South Africa
- Robert Gordon (minister) (1786–1853), Free Church of Scotland minister
- Robert Gordon (banker) (1829–1918), founder of the Metropolitan Museum of Art
- Robert M. Gordon (psychologist) (born 1947), American psychologist
- Robert L. Gordon III (born 1957), American business executive
- Robert J. Gordon (lawyer), American trial lawyer
- Robert Roy Gordon, Jamaican convicted murderer

== See also ==
- Bob Gordon (disambiguation)
- Robert Gordon University, Aberdeen, Scotland
- Robert Gordon's College, Aberdeen, Scotland
- Roberts-Gordon LLC, HVAC manufacturer
