= Richard Gordon =

Richard Gordon may refer to:

- Richard Gordon (actor), American actor in vaudeville and films and on stage and radio
- Richard Gordon (English author) (1921–2017), English novelist, screenwriter and doctor
- Richard Gordon (lawyer), president of the American Jewish Congress
- Richard Gordon (American football) (born 1987), American football player for the Denver Broncos
- Richard F. Gordon Jr. (1929–2017), American astronaut
- Richard Gordon (film producer) (1925–2011), British film producer
- Richard Gordon (broadcaster) (born 1960), Scottish sports broadcaster
- Richard Gordon (Scottish author) (1947–2009), Scottish author
- R. H. Gordon (1844–1917), American politician
- Richard Gordon (photographer) (1945–2012), American photographer
- Richard Gordon (theoretical biologist) (born 1943), American theoretical biologist
- Richard G. Gordon (born 1953), American geophysicist
- Richard Gordon (New Hampshire politician)

== See also ==
- Rich Gordon (born 1948), American politician from California
- Rick Gordon (born 1958), Scottish rugby union player
- Dick Gordon (disambiguation)
