= Charles Gordon =

Charles Gordon may refer to:

== Politics and armed forces ==
- Charles Gordon, 1st Earl of Aboyne (1638–1678)
- Charles Gordon, 2nd Earl of Aboyne (1670–1702)
- Charles Gordon, 4th Earl of Aboyne (1726–1794)
- Charles Gordon (Royal Navy officer) (c. 1780–1860)
- Charles Gordon, 10th Marquess of Huntly (1792–1863), Scottish peer and politician
- Charles George Gordon (1833–1885), British army officer and colonial governor, killed at Khartoum
- Charles Gordon, 11th Marquess of Huntly (1847–1937), Scottish Liberal politician
- Charles William Gordon (MP) (1817–1863), British Conservative politician
- Charles Gordon (British Army officer) (1878–1917)
- Charles Gordon Bell (1889–1918), British aviator
- Charles Gordon (parliamentary official) (1918–2009), English parliamentary clerk
- Charlie Gordon (born 1951), Scottish Labour Party politician

== Sports ==
- Charles Gordon (cricketer, born 1849) (1849–1930), English cricketer
- Charles Gordon (cricketer, born 1814) (1814–1899), English cricketer and gin distiller
- Charles Gordon (Canadian football) (born 1968), Canadian football player
- Charles Gordon (American football) (born 1984), American cornerback

== Other ==
- Ralph Connor (1860–1937), pen name of Rev. Charles William Gordon, Canadian novelist
- Charles Blair Gordon (1867–1939), Canadian banker
- Charles Gordon (trade unionist) (died 1929), British trade union leader
- Charles Gordon (lawyer) (1905–1999), American immigration attorney
- Charles Gordon (artist) (1909–1978), American watercolor artist
- Charles Gordon (journalist) (born 1940), Canadian writer and journalist
- Charles Jason Gordon (born 1959), Barbadian archbishop
- Charles Gordon (producer) (1947–2020), American film producer of October Sky
- Charles B. W. Gordon Sr. (1861–1941) American Baptist minister, journalist, and newspaper publisher
- Charles Grant Gordon (1927–2013), Scottish whisky distiller

== Characters ==
- Charlie Gordon, the main character in Flowers for Algernon by Daniel Keyes, and in the film adaptation Charly
