= Bob Gordon =

Bob Gordon may refer to:

- Bob Gordon (footballer) (1870–1938), Scottish footballer
- Bob Gordon (Canadian intelligence), former Canadian Security Intelligence Service agent
- Bob Gordon (saxophonist) (1928–1955), cool jazz musician
- Bob Gordon (rugby union) (1930–1995), Scotland international rugby union player
- Bob Gordon (racing driver), father of Robby Gordon

== See also ==
- Robert Gordon (disambiguation)
