= Michael Gordon =

Michael Gordon may refer to:

== Entertainment ==
- Michael Gordon (film director) (1909–1993), American film director
- Michael Gordon (film editor) (1909–2008), British film editor
- Michael Z. Gordon (1941–2024), American film and TV producer and composer
- Michael Gordon, actor in The Space Museum
- Michael Gordon (composer) (born 1956), American classical composer
- Michael Zev Gordon (born 1963), British composer
- Mike Gordon (born 1965), American rock musician
- Mick Gordon (director) (born 1970), Northern Irish theater director, playwright, and essayist
- Mick Gordon (composer) (born 1985), Australian composer and sound designer
- Mk.gee (born 1997), American songwriter and record producer whose real name is Michael Gordon
- Michael Gordon (writer), writer on Late Night with Conan O'Brien television show, see Writers Guild of America Awards 2007

== Sports ==
- Mike Gordon (baseball) (1953–2014), American baseball player
- Michael Gordon (rugby league) (born 1983), Australian professional rugby league footballer
- Michael Gordon (footballer) (born 1984), English footballer

== Other ==
- Michael J. C. Gordon (1948–2017), British computer scientist
- Mike Gordon (politician) (1957–2005), member of the California State Assembly
- Michael Gordon (Australian journalist) (1955–2018), Australian newspaper journalist
- Michael R. Gordon, military correspondent for The Wall Street Journal
- Michael Gordon (businessman), co-founder of Vink Asset Management, president of Fenway Sports Group
- Mikhl Gordon (1823–1890), Yiddish songwriter and poet

== See also ==
- Gordon (surname)
