= 2BD =

Scottish radio station

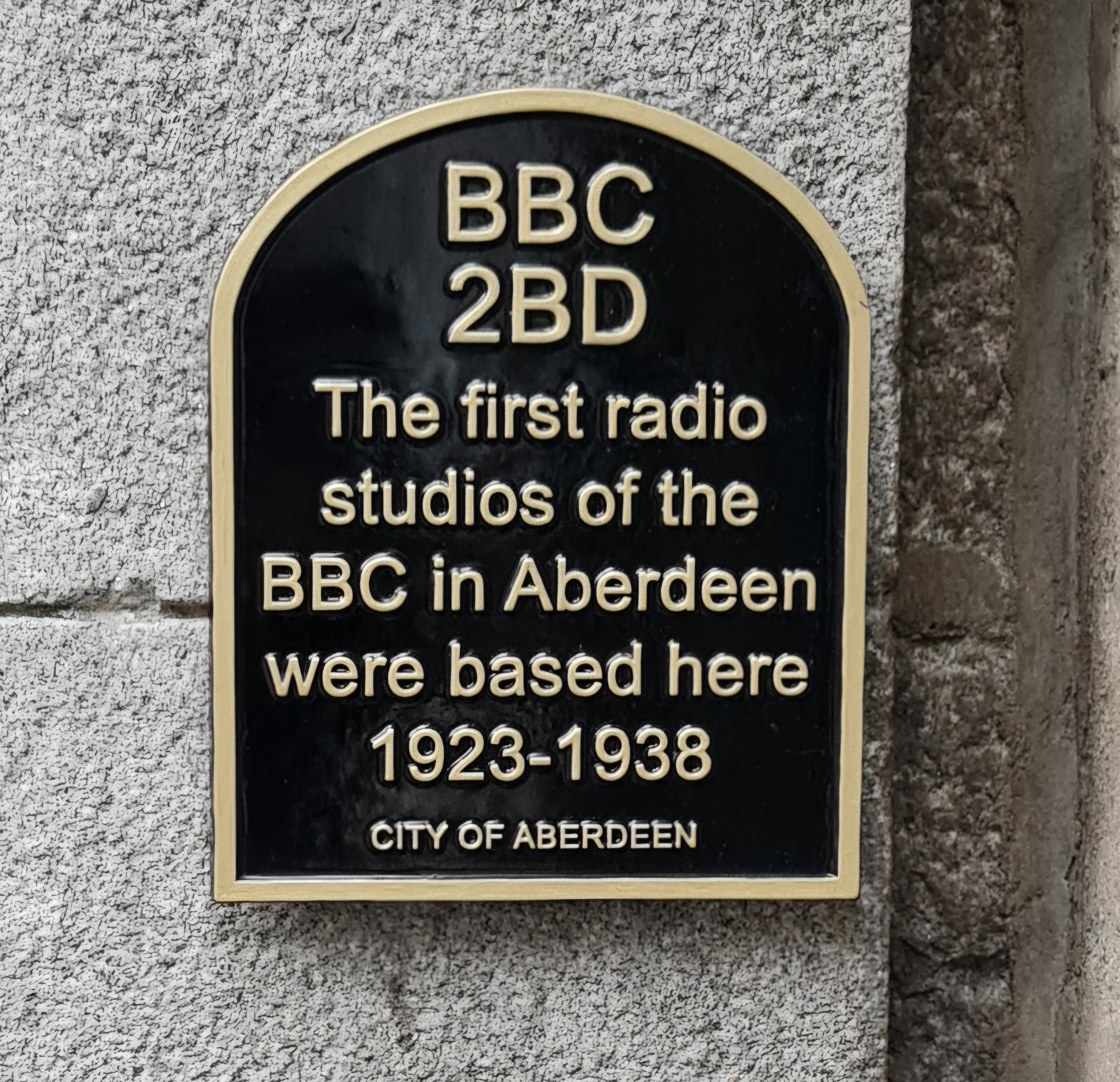
- Scotland
- Broadcast area: Aberdeen City council area
- Frequency: 606 kHz : 495 m MW

Programming
- Format: Light music, comedy, news and sport

Ownership
- Owner: BBC

History
- First air date: 10 October 1923; 102 years ago
- Last air date: 1929; 97 years ago

2BD was a local radio station opened on 10 October 1923 in Aberdeen, Scotland, by the British Broadcasting Company (later to become the British Broadcasting Corporation). Operating from a studio at the rear of a shop belonging to Aberdeen Electrical Engineering at 17 Belmont Street and a transmitter located on the premises of the Aberdeen Steam Laundry Company, the station broadcast on a frequency of 606 kHz (495 m) medium wave.

== Planning ==
After being appointed managing director of the BBC in 1922, John Reith instigated a programme of expansion of the radio network in the United Kingdom, increasing the number of local stations from three to twenty in a relatively short period of time. Aberdeen was one of the first new stations to be put on air.

== Inception ==
The opening ceremony for the station was conducted by the Marquis of Aberdeen at 9pm on 10 October 1923, followed by a performance from the Band of the 2nd Gordon Highlanders. Those attending the launch included the Lord Provost of Aberdeen, BBC MD John Reith, station director R. E. Jeffery, and chief engineer Peter Eckersley.

== Technical data ==
Inside the studio, broadcasters used a single microphone on a wheeled base, which severely restricted the number of users at any one time. Being transmitted from the Aberdeen Steam Laundry Company building, the signal then travelled to an aerial slung between two Marconi radio masts sited beside some nearby electrical generators (which frequently interfered with broadcasts). Although the transmitter was of low power, it was reported that the first programmes were heard in Norway and, similarly, subsequent broadcasts more than a year later could be heard in the United States during "International Radio Week".

== Format ==
During a live six-hour transmission day, the station supplied a mix of light music, comedy, news, and sports reporting. A former Scottish football referee, Peter Craigmyle, broadcast a 15-minute programme once a week devoted to previewing sports events.

The station had its own "2BD Repertory Company" with members including William Mair, Daisy Moncur, Grace Wilson and George Dewar. It had its own 12-piece orchestra, supplemented by harmonica player Donald Davidson, although they were reduced to eight members in 1926, and disbanded after the demise of the station.

Comedy was supplied by entertainers such as Jessie R. F. Allan, and many other artistes appeared before the microphone, including local boy Harry Gordon and character actress Mabel Constanduris.

== Expansion and decline ==
In May 1925, 2BD's premises were extended to take in number 15 Belmont Street; however, in 1926 the "Geneva Frequency Plan" cut the number of available wavelengths by 50%. 2BD's frequency was changed to 610 kHz (491.8 m) with effect from 14 November 1926 and then a month later – because of the interference caused by 2BD having to share a frequency with the BBC's Birmingham station, 5IT – to 600 kHz (500 m). In time, the Aberdeen station, along with other local Scottish transmitters, was replaced by a Scottish Regional Programme covering most of the country on a single high-power medium-wave frequency, while a long-wave transmitter (sited first at Chelmsford, then Daventry, and finally at Droitwich) was powerful enough to provide a National Programme audible throughout most of the United Kingdom, and "2BD" was last heard from in 1929. The BBC broadcasting centre subsequently moved to larger premises in Beechgrove Terrace, which were demolished and replaced by a new building on the same site in the year 2000.
