= Harold Gordon =

Harold Gordon may refer to:

- Harold Gordon (actor), see Viva Zapata!
- Harold Gordon (biologist), see RNA Tie Club
- Harold Gordon (baseball), see 1957 Caribbean Series

== See also ==
- Harry Gordon (disambiguation)
