= Clarence Gordon =

Clarence Gordon may refer to:

- Clarence C. Gordon (1928–1981), American botanist
- Clarrie Gordon (1917–1983), New Zealand Olympic boxer
