= Dick Gordon =

Dick Gordon may refer to:

- Dick Gordon (American football) (born 1944), American football player
- Dick Gordon (politician) (born 1945), Filipino politician, civil servant and journalist
- Dick Gordon (sportswriter) (1911–2008), American sports writer
- Dick Gordon, host of the radio series The Story with Dick Gordon

== See also ==
- Richard Gordon (disambiguation)
