= Dan Gordon =

Dan Gordon may refer to:

== Sportspeople ==
- Dan Gordon (Scottish footballer) (1881–1958), Scottish footballer
- Dan Gordon (Gaelic footballer), Gaelic football player from County Down, Northern Ireland

== Others ==
- Dan Gordon (actor) (born 1961), Northern Irish actor, director and playwright
- Dan Gordon (animator) (died 1969), writer and director of cartoons
- Dan Gordon (Charmed), character in the television series Charmed
- Dan Gordon (screenwriter), writer of screenplays for films such as The Hurricane
- Dan Gordon, co-founder and original brewmaster for Gordon Biersch Brewing Company
- Dan Gordon, the current Mayor of Waimakariri, in New Zealand

== See also ==
- Daniel Gordon (disambiguation)
