= Longton, Adderley Green and Bucknall Railway =

Longton, Adderley Green, and Bucknall Railway Act 1866
- Act of Parliament
- Parliament of the United Kingdom
- Long title: An Act for making a Railway from Longton through Adderley Green to Bucknall, with Branches, all in the County of Stafford; and for other Purposes.
- Citation: 29 & 30 Vict. c. clxxiv

Dates
- Royal assent: 16 July 1866

Text of statute as originally enacted

The Longton, Adderley Green and Bucknall Railway (LAG&B) was a railway line in North Staffordshire that operated between 1875 and 1964. The line was the idea of the identically named Longton, Adderley Green and Bucknall Railway Company which was granted approval in the Longton, Adderley Green, and Bucknall Railway Act 1866 (29 & 30 Vict. c. clxxiv) to build a 4.25 mi (6.84 km) goods only line from Botteslow Junction on the North Staffordshire Railway's Biddulph Valley line. The LAG&B did not construct the line but leased all construction and operation to the North Staffordshire Railway (NSR).

Construction was not fast and it was nine years after approval before the line opened in September 1875. The coal-owner and railway director William Francis Gordon put his Lawn Colliery at Bucknall on the market in 1870, anticipating its completion. Two time extensions were required, and the plans were altered to provide a second junction with the NSR at Millfield Junction, near Normacot on the Crewe–Derby line.

Longton, Adderley Green, and Bucknall Railway (Transfer) Act 1894
- Act of Parliament
- Parliament of the United Kingdom
- Long title: An Act for vesting the undertaking of the Longton Adderley Green and Bucknall Railway Company in the North Staffordshire Railway Company and for other purposes,
- Citation: 57 & 58 Vict. c. xciii

Dates
- Royal assent: 20 July 1894

Text of statute as originally enacted

The NSR purchased the Longton, Adderley Green and Bucknall Railway Company under the Longton, Adderley Green, and Bucknall Railway (Transfer) Act 1894 (57 & 58 Vict. c. xciii) to take ownership of the line and on 1 January 1895, the NSR severed the line near Weston Coyney to increase the distance that coal had to be carried on the company's lines therefore increasing revenue. The line remained split until closure in the 1960s when the 0.5 miles (0.80 km) branch from Millfield Junction closed at the end of December 1963. The longer 3.675 miles (5.91 km) branch from Botteslow Junction closed the following year.
