= Ruth Ogden =

American writer (1853–1927)

- Born: December 27, 1853; Brooklyn, New York City, U.S.
- Died: July 2, 1927 (aged 73); Brooklyn, New York City, U.S.
- Writing career
- Pen name: Fannie Ogden Ide

Ruth Ogden (December 27, 1853–July 2, 1927) was the pen name of Fannie Ogden Ide, a late 19th century American children's book author.

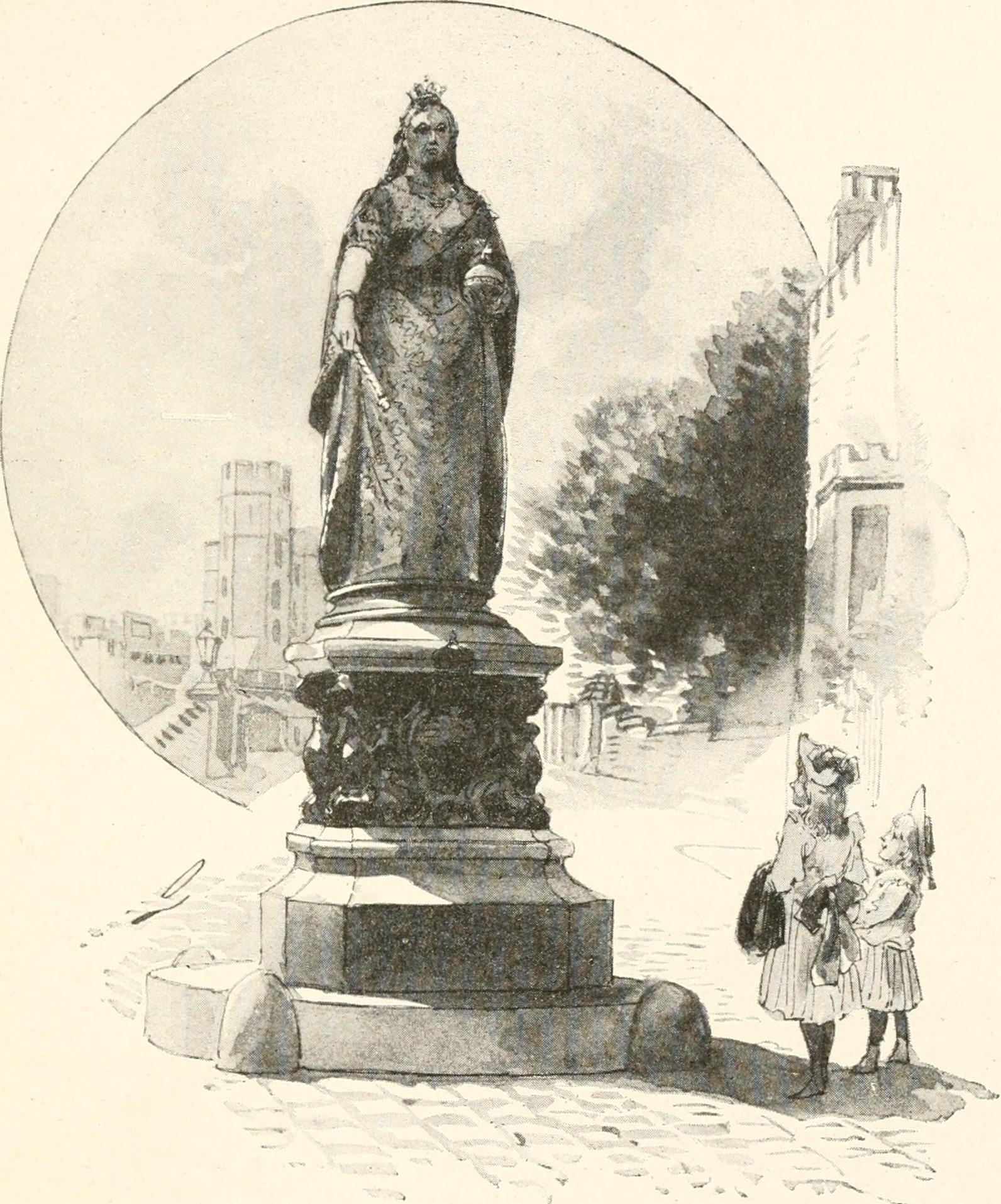
Illustration from Ruth Ogden's A Little Queen of Hearts (1893).

== Biography ==
Fannie Ogden was born in Brooklyn, New York, in 1853 to Abigail (Murphy) Ogden and Jonathan Ogden, a merchant. Her much older brother Robert became a wealthy businessman. Educated in private schools, she married Charles W. Ide in 1875. They had a daughter, Alice.

Under the pen name 'Ruth Ogden', she wrote popular children's books and also contributed stories and poems to magazines. Several of her books, such as A Loyal Little Red-Coat (1890) and Loyal Hearts and True (1899), are based in part on historical events. Critics often used the word "charming" to describe her books, and one critic praised her for "purity of tone, animation of spirit, and good English style".

Her books were illustrated by F.C. Gordon, George T. Tobin, H.A. Ogden, and W. Rainey, among others.

She died in Brooklyn in 1927.

== Quote ==
Whether you happen to be four or five, or six, or seven, or even older than that, no doubt you know by this time that a great many things need to be learned in this world, everything, in fact, and never more things than at seven. At least, so thought little Tattine, and what troubled her the most was that some of the things seemed quite wrong, and yet no one was able to right them. (Tattine, opening sentences)

== Books ==
- His Little Royal Highness (1887)
- A Loyal Little Red-Coat (1890)
- A Little Queen of Hearts (1893)
- Courage (1893)
- Little Homespun (1897)
- Tattine (1898)
- Loyal Hearts and True (1899)
- Friendship: The Good and Perfect Gift (1903; Christmas brochure)
- Little Pierre and Big Peter (1915)
