= Pamela Gordon =

Pamela Gordon may refer to:

- Pamela Gordon (actress) (1937 – 2003), American actress
- Pamela Gordon (Bermudian politician) (born 1955), Bermudian politician
- Pamela Gordon (American politician)
- Pamela Anne Gordon (born 1943), Canadian model
