= Clara D. Pierson =

American writer

Clara Dillingham Pierson (March 11, 1868 – 1952) was an early 20th century American children's author.

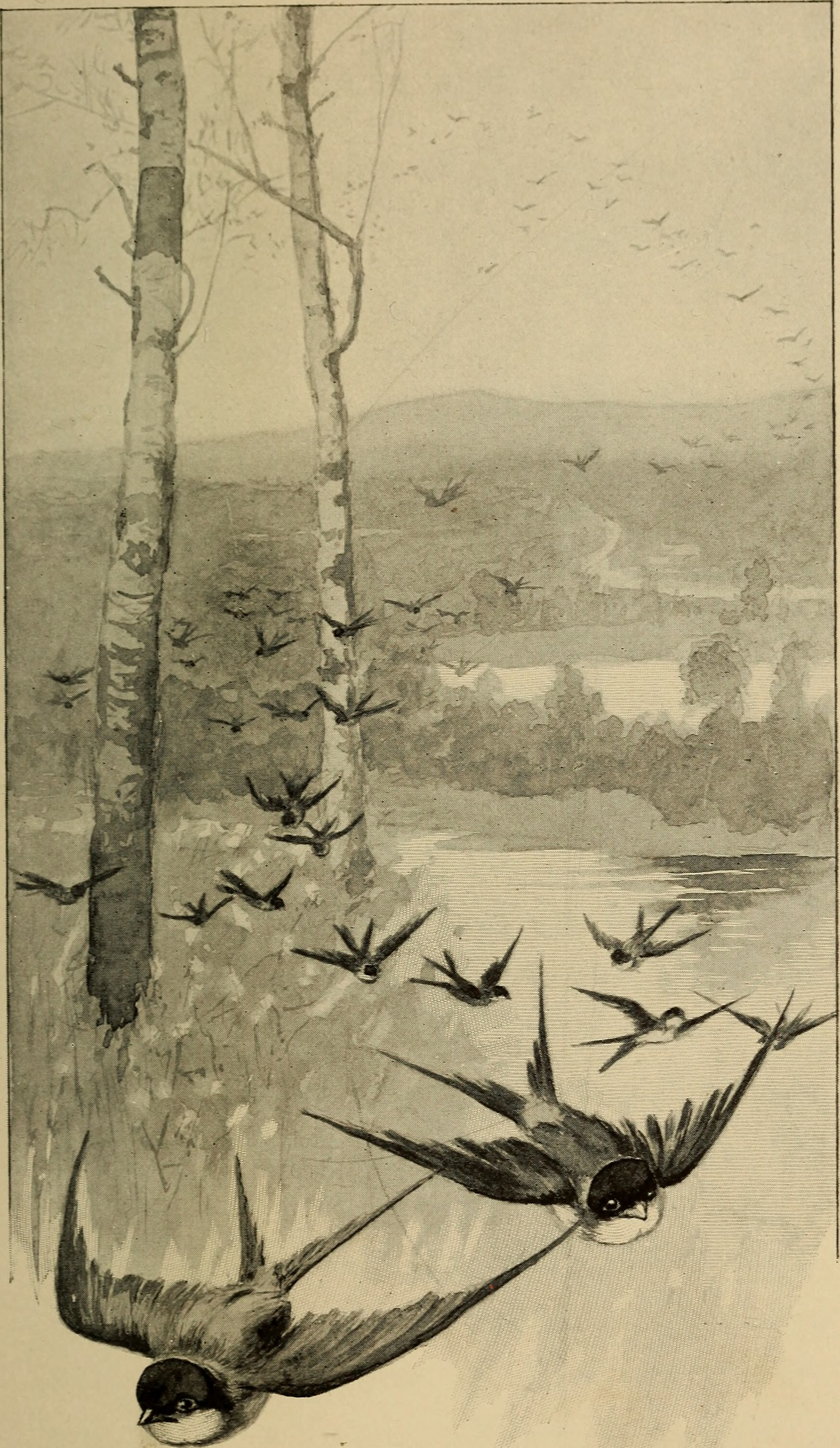
Illustration from Clara D. Pierson's Among the Farmyard People (1899)

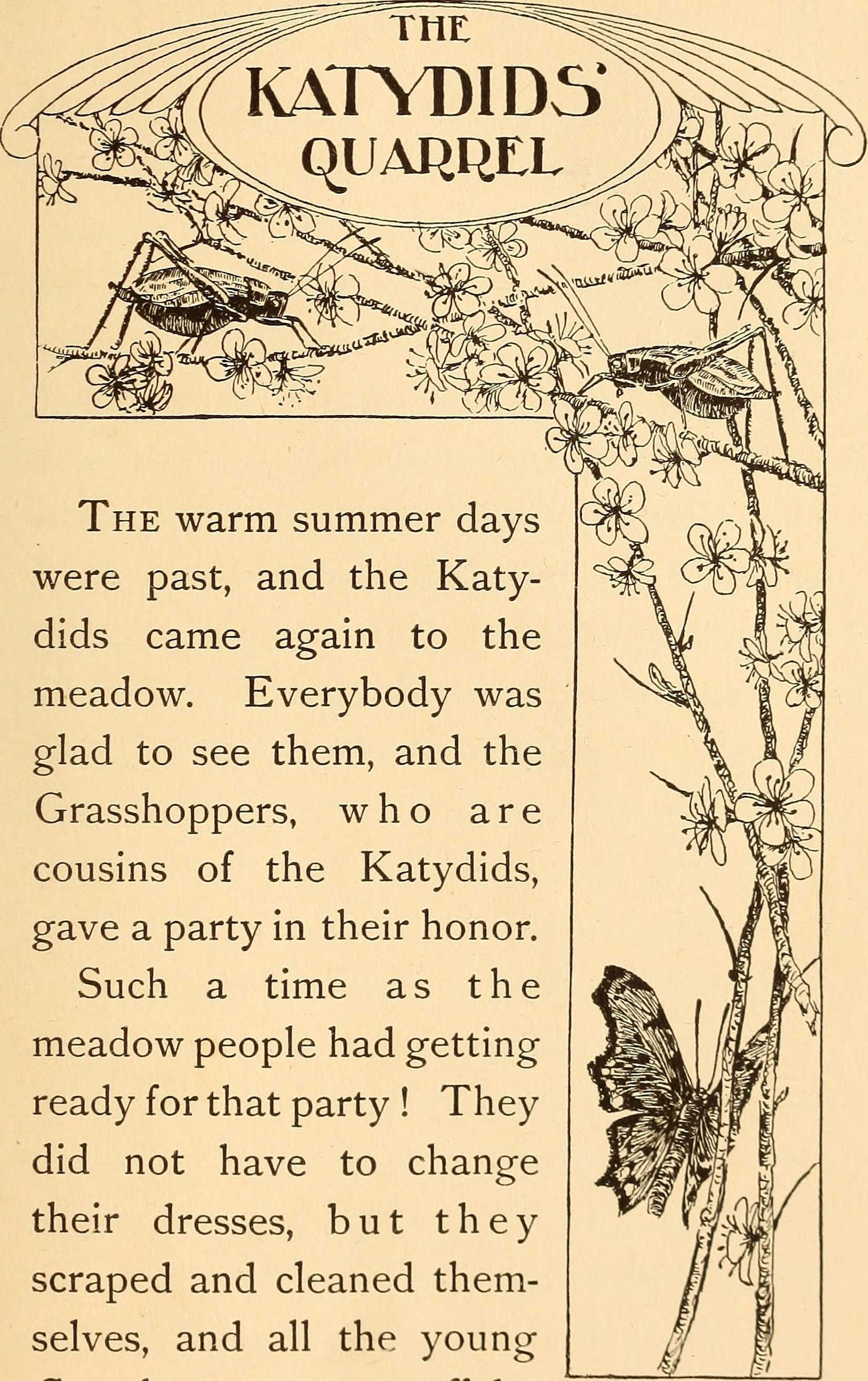
Page from Clara D. Pierson's Among the Meadow People (1901 edition)

== Early life and education ==
Clara Eleanor Dillingham was born in 1868 in Coldwater, Michigan, the only child of Jennie Lincoln Dillingham and Captain Lucius Abell Dillingham. After being mainly home-schooled, she went on to complete a training program for kindergarten teachers in Chicago, Illinois. She then taught in a similar program at Alma College for a few years, becoming superintendent of the college's Training Department.

== Writing career ==
Pierson became a successful author of children's books, with her most popular works being quasi-naturalistic stories about animals. Her "Among the People" series of animal story collections published between 1897 and 1902 placed her among the leading nature-story authors of her day. Due to its enduring popularity, this series is back in print. Like similar animal tales written a few years later by Thornton Burgess, her stories often carry a moral, hinted at in titles such as "The Thrifty Deer-Mouse". The "Among the People" books were illustrated by F.C. Gordon.

Another of her series features the adventures of the three Miller children and a house called Pencroft, which was also the name of the summer home in Omena, Michigan, that Pierson built with her income as a writer.

== Personal life ==
She married hardware store owner John Williams Smith Pierson in 1894, and they resided in Stanton, Michigan, in the early 1900s. They had a child who died shortly after birth, and they later adopted two sons, John Howard Pierson and Harold Dillingham. Their home on Lincoln Street in Stanton (built in 1904) is now a church.

Pierson and her husband moved to Grand Rapids in 1930, where she resided until her death in 1952. Her papers—including story drafts, correspondence, and an unpublished autobiography—are held by the University of Michigan.

== Publications ==
"Among the People" series

- Among the Meadow People (1897)
- Among the Forest People (1898)
- Among the Farmyard People (1899)
- Among the Pond People (1901)
- Among the Night People (1902)

"The Millers" series

- Three Little Millers: A Story of the Boys and Girls of Pencroft (1905)
- The Millers at Pencroft (1906)
- The Millers and Their Playmates (1907)
- The Millers and Their New Home (1908)

Other books

- Dooryard Stories (1903)
- Tales of a Poultry Farm (1904)
- Plow Stories (1923)
- Living with Our Children: A Book of Little Essays for Mothers (1923)
