= Gordon Oliver (disambiguation) =

Gordon Oliver (1910–1995) was an American actor and film producer.

Gordon Oliver may also refer to:

- Gordon Oliver (South African politician), former mayor of Cape Town
- Gordon Oliver (English politician), former mayor of Torbay

== See also ==
- Oliver Gordon (disambiguation)
