= Frederick Gordon =

Frederick Gordon may refer to:

- Frederick Gordon (hotelier) (1835–1904), British hotel entrepreneur
- F. C. Gordon (Frederick Charles Gordon, 1856–1924), Canadian illustrator
- Frederick Stanley Gordon (1897–1985), World War I flying ace from New Zealand
- Frederick Gordon (British Army officer) (1861–1927)
- Frederick Waldhausen Gordon (born 2010), Scottish chess player

== See also ==
- Fred Gordon (1900–1985), ice hockey player
