= Peter Craigmyle =

Scottish football referee (1894–1979)

- Born: 1 January 1894; Oldmeldrum, Aberdeenshire, Scotland
- Died: 21 November 1979 (aged 85); Aberdeen, Scotland
- Burial place: Trinity Cemetery, Aberdeen
- Occupation: football referee
- Years active: 1919-1949

Peter Craigmyle (1 January 1894 – 21 November 1979) was a Scottish football referee. He was born in Oldmeldrum, Aberdeenshire, Scotland, the son of Peter William Craigmyle and Isabella Barclay Craigmyle (née McWilliam).

His own playing aspirations were dashed after breaking both his legs in 1916, but he was encouraged to take up refereeing by the Aberdeen FC manager at the time, Jimmy Philip.

In the 1920s he had a weekly programme on a local radio station 2BD. He travelled to Malta and the Faroe Islands lecturing and refereeing and was known as the "fearless Aberdonian".

In a refereeing career spanning over 31 years, he earned many honours and accolades.

He refereed almost every senior cup final in Scotland and Ireland as well as many Old Firm matches. Craigmyle is known to have officiated 26 international matches during the period from 1924 to 1946. He refereed three Scotland-England international matches, at Hampden Park in 1941, 1943 and 1946.

He retired from refereeing in 1949. He owned a sports shop and wholesale tobacconists on King Street, Aberdeen. He was also a keen bowls player and was president of a number of bowling clubs in Aberdeen.

He was a trained vocalist and an accomplished stage performer, master of ceremonies, lecturer, event compere and organizer. During World War II, he organised and produced shows at many venues in North East Scotland, including Aberdeen's Garrison Theatre and ran classical music concerts in the Cowdray Hall, Aberdeen, to raise money for the troops.

He died on 21 November 1979 at home in Aberdeen. His second wife Annie "Nan" Craigmyle died on 23 November 2004 at Aberdeen Royal Infirmary.

His book A Lifetime of Soccer was published in 1949 by Aberdeen Journals and was republished in 2021 by his great-nephew. A website www.petercraigmyle.com and a new publication The Remarkable Story of Peter Craigmyle - The Fearless Aberdonian, launched in 2023 provides further insight, quoting over 700 press articles and features from 1919 to 2011.
