= Gerald Gordon (disambiguation) =

Gerald Gordon (1929-2025) was a Scottish lawyer. The name can also refer to:

- Gerald L. Gordon, American economist and author
- Gerald Gordon (politician) (1895-1959), member of the Kansas House of Representatives
