= Charles Gordon (cricketer, born 1849) =

English cricketer

Personal information
- Born: 8 September 1849; Oakleaze, Gloucestershire, England
- Died: 24 March 1930 (aged 80); Nottington House, Dorset, England
- Source: Cricinfo, 3 May 2015

Charles Steward Gordon (8 September 1849 – 24 March 1930) was an English first-class cricketer. He was a right-handed batsman and an underarm slow bowler who played mainly for Gloucestershire County Cricket Club from 1870 to 1875. He also played one match for Victoria in 1870. Gordon was born at Oakleaze, Gloucestershire.

Gordon made 14 first-class appearances, scoring 504 runs, with a highest innings of 121, which was his only century, in addition to 3 half-centuries. He held 8 catches in his career and took 8 wickets with a best analysis of 3–67.

Gordon died at Nottington House, Nottington, Dorset on 24 March 1930.
