= David Gordon =

David Gordon may refer to:

== Academics ==
- David Gordon (economist) (1944–1996), American economist
- David Gordon (philosopher) (born 1948), Ludwig von Mises Institute senior fellow

== Businessmen ==
- David Gordon (software entrepreneur) (1943–1996), American computer game publisher
- David Gordon (television executive) (born 1942/3), British businessman

== Performers ==
- David Gordon (choreographer) (1936–2022), postmodern dancer, choreographer, and theatrical director
- David Gordon (tenor) (born 1947), American concert and opera tenor

== Politicians ==
- Sir David Gordon (Australian politician) (1865–1946), South Australian politician who served in federal and state parliaments
- David Gordon, 4th Marquess of Aberdeen and Temair (1908–1974), British peer and soldier
- David Gordon (Ontario politician), member of the Natural Law Party and yogic flyer
- David Alexander Gordon (1858–1919), Canadian politician
- David F. Gordon, head of research at Eurasia Group, former director of policy planning at the US Department of State
- David William Gordon (1832–1893), Canadian politician

== Sportsmen ==
- Davy Gordon (1882–1963), Scottish football player and manager

== Writers ==
- David Gordon (novelist) (born 1967), American mystery writer
- a pseudonym of Randall Garrett (1927–1987)

== Characters ==
- David "Gordo" Gordon, fictional character from the TV series Lizzie McGuire, played by Adam Lamberg
