= Gerald L. Gordon =

American economist and author

Gerald L. Gordon is an American economist and author, who is the president and chief executive officer of the Fairfax County Economic Development Authority (FCEDA) in Fairfax County, Virginia, a position he has held since late 1983. In 2016, Virginia Business magazine named Gordon one of its "50 most influential Virginians." He was named to the same list in 2013, 2014 and 2015. In 2015, Gordon was honored by International Economic Development Council with the Jeffrey A. Finkle Organizational Leadership Award for a “lasting commitment to the field of economic development.”

== Career ==
Gordon holds a bachelor's degree from The Citadel, a master's degree from George Washington University, and a doctorate in international economics from The Catholic University of America.

Prior to joining FCEDA, Gordon held positions with Arlington County, Virginia and the United States Department of Labor. Gordon has taught at the University of Maryland, College Park, George Mason University, and Virginia Commonwealth University.

Gordon was awarded a Fulbright Award for study in Scotland.

== Publishing ==
Gordon is the author of 13 books. His most recent, The Economic Survival of America's Isolated Small Towns, from CRC Press (2015), "provides a detailed discussion of the context of these towns, from the internal challenges that isolate them and force independent action to the extent to which they can rely on neighboring or other macro-level resources."

In 2013, Gordon published The Economic Viability of Micropolitan America, which "highlights cities and towns from Bangor, Maine, to Walla Walla, Washington to provide case studies on their economic past and future, illustrate dramatic shifts in the roles they play in larger economies, and address questions asked by these communities as they face an uncertain future."

In 2018, Gordon's "Understanding Community Economic Growth and Decline" was published by Routledge Press in New York. This work discusses means by which local communities can accelerate their pace of economic development or redevelopment.

Reinventing Local and Regional Economies, published by CRC Press (2011), “delineates the dos and don’ts to observe in order to sustain economic vitality in any community.”

In 2009, Gordon published The Formula for Economic Growth on Main Street America, also by CRC Press. The book is part of CRC's American Society for Public Administration series designed to increase national and international interest for topics in public administration.

On June 11, 2013, the FCEDA announced that Gordon was named chairman of The Foundation for Fairfax County Public Schools. He chaired that board until July 2016. In July 2015 he also assumed chairmanship of the advisory board of the George Mason University Honors College.

== Awards and honors ==
In December 2010, Gordon was named 2010 Virginia Business Person of the Year by Virginia Business magazine, which cited his role in helping attract major business headquarters to Fairfax County as a key factor in their decision. Virginia Business also named him one of its “50 most influential Virginians” list in 2013, 2014, 2015 and 2016.
