= Charles Gordon (artist) =

American painter

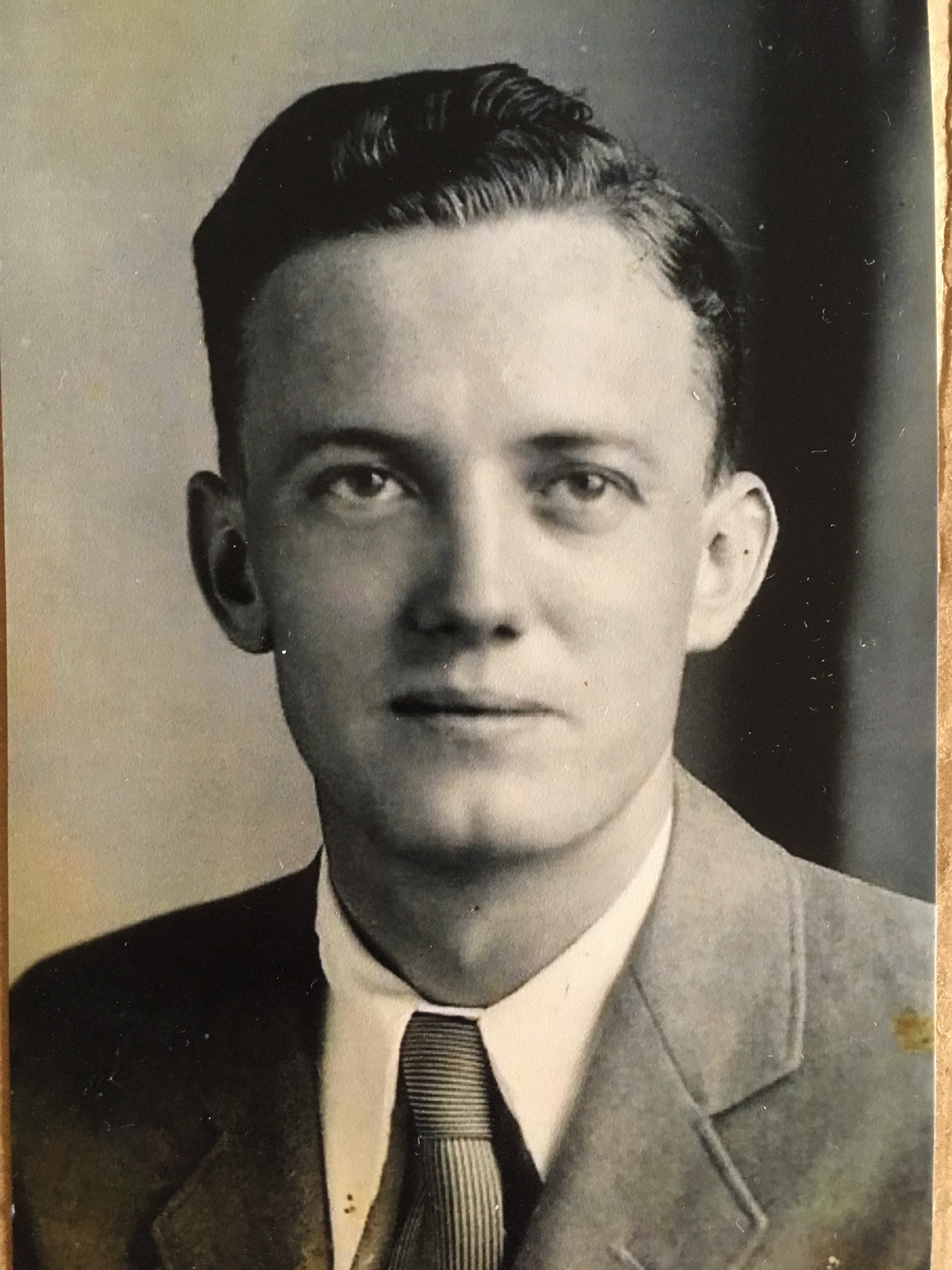
Charles Allyn Gordon, Jr.

Charles Allyn Gordon, Jr. (July 3, 1909, Corsicana, Texas - June 9, 1978 Los Angeles, California), was a watercolor artist. He graduated from Corsicana High School in 1925 and from the University of Texas, Austin in 1929 with a degree in architecture. Gordon is best known for his watercolor artwork. Between 1935 and 1940 he exhibited at art events sponsored by the Museum of Fine Art of Houston. Then in the early 1940s he exhibited at events held at the Los Angeles Museum of History, Science and Art. Examples of his work are 'Cape Cod', 'Bright Lights', 'Trees in Winter' and 'Pink Roofs – Taxco' (1944), the latter today in the collection of The Norton Simon Museum in Pasadena, California. Gordon was fluent in Spanish and traveled frequently to Mexico by car to paint out of the way places. He is credited by name in the 1957 English language edition of the book Pratero and I by the 1956 Literature Nobel prize winner Juan Ramón Jiménez for having helped translate the first 18 chapters. Besides art and literature Allyn Gordon also had interests in archeology and genealogy.
