= Lucy Gordon =

Lucy Gordon may refer to:

- Lucy, Lady Duff-Gordon (1863–1935), English fashion designer
- Lucy Gordon (actress) (1980–2009), English actress and model
- Lucy Gordon (tennis), American former professional tennis player
- Lucy Gordon (writer), English novelist
