= Francis Gordon =

Francis Gordon may refer to:

- Francis Gordon (cricketer) (1808–1857), British Army officer and amateur cricketer
- Francis Gordon (politician) (1928–2013), American politician
