= Christopher Gordon =

Christopher Gordon may refer to:

- Christopher Gordon (squash player) (born 1986), American squash player
- Christopher Gordon (composer), Australian composer
- Chris Gordon (ice hockey) (born 1970), American ice hockey goaltender
- Chris Gordon (actor), British actor
- Chris Gordon, vocalist and guitarist of Scottish rock band Baby Chaos
