= Peter Gordon =

Peter Gordon may refer to:

== Sports ==
- Peter Gordon (English footballer) (1932–1990), English association football player
- Peter Gordon (South African soccer) (born 1963), South African football defender
- Peter Gordon (sailor) (1882–1975), Canadian sailor and silver medalist in the 1932 Olympics
- Peter Gordon (discus thrower), British athlete and champion at the 1981 UK Athletics Championships

== Others ==
- Peter Gordon (chef) (born 1963), celebrity chef from New Zealand
- Peter Gordon (composer) (born 1951), composer and musician based in New York City
- Peter Gordon (historian), historian and professor at Harvard University
- Peter Gordon, Australian lawyer and former Western Bulldogs president
- Peter Gordon (radio presenter), radio presenter in Surrey, England
- Peter Gordon (politician) (1921–1991), New Zealand politician

== See also ==
- Peter and Gordon, musical duo from the United Kingdom
- Peter Gordon MacKay (born 1965), Canadian cabinet minister
