= Michael Gordon (Australian journalist) =

Australian journalist (1955–2018)

- Born: 14 August 1955; Melbourne, Australia
- Died: 3 February 2018 (aged 62); Cowes, Australia
- Education: University of Melbourne (B.Comm)
- Occupation: Journalist
- Years active: 1973–2017
- Employer(s): The Age, The Herald, The Australian
- Parent: Harry Gordon

Michael Gordon (14 August 1955 – 3 February 2018) was an Australian journalist. Gordon was the son of the newspaper journalist and editor Harry Gordon.

== Early life and education ==
Born in 1955 in Melbourne, Australia, he completed his part-time studies in degree in Commerce at Melbourne University.

== Career ==
Gordon joined The Age in 1973 at the age of 17 as a cadet journalist and spent most of his career with the newspaper in Melbourne, reporting on areas such as politics, police, industrial relations and sport. He retired from The Age in June 2017 at the rank of national political editor, the position he held since 2013, after working for the newspaper for 37 years. Gordon also worked for a time as a New York correspondent for The Herald in the late 1980s and later as national political editor for The Australian from 1994 to 1998.

Gordon won a Walkley Award in 2017 for Most Outstanding Contribution to Journalism 2017. Gordon was also the recipient of the 2005 Graeme Perkin Award for Australia's most outstanding journalist at the Quill Awards.

== Death ==
He died in February 2018, at the age of 62, from a heart attack while taking part in an ocean swim at Cowes in Phillip Island, Victoria. His death prompted messages of sympathy from Tony Wright (associate editor of The Age), Greg Hywood (Fairfax Media chief executive) and former prime minister Malcolm Turnbull.

After his death, a journalism fellowship in his name was set up by the Melbourne Press Club.
