= Patrick Gordon (disambiguation) =

Patrick Gordon (1635–1699) was a Scottish general in the Russian army.

Patrick Gordon may also refer to:

- Patrick Gordon of Auchindoun (1538–1594), Scottish landowner and rebel
- Patrick Gordon (governor) (died 1736), governor of the Province of Pennsylvania, 1726–1736
- Patrick Gordon (footballer) (1870–?), Scottish footballer
- Patrick Hunter Gordon (1916–1978), Scottish soldier and electrical engineer
- Pat Gordon, Coronation Street character
