= Lawrence Gordon =

Lawrence Gordon may refer to:

- Lawrence Gordon (producer) (born 1936), American film executive
- Lawrence Gordon (character), a fictional character in the Saw film series
- Lawrence Gordon (gridiron football) (born 1984), professional Canadian football defensive back
- Lawrence A. Gordon, professor of managerial accounting and information assurance

== See also ==
- Larry Gordon (disambiguation)
