= Mary Gordon =

Mary Gordon may refer to:

- Mary Gordon (prison inspector) (1861–1941), British physician and prison inspector
- Mary Charlotte Gordon (1840–1926), wrote as Mrs Disney Leith
- Mary Gordon (writer) (born 1949), American author
- Mary Gordon (actress) (1882–1963), Scottish actress of the 1920s–50s who appeared in nearly 300 films
- Mary Gordon (child advocate) (born 1947), Canadian social entrepreneur, author, and child advocate
- Mary Gordon Calder (c. 1906–1992), Scottish paleobotanist
- Mary Gordon Ellis (1889–1934), educator and politician from South Carolina
- Mary Gordon Murray (born 1953), American actress and singer

== See also ==
- Mary Gordon-Watson (born 1948), British equestrian
