= Wayne Gordon =

Wayne Gordon may refer to:

- Wayne Gordon (boxer) (born 1963), Canadian boxer at the 1984 Summer Olympics
- Wayne Gordon (footballer) (1954–1983), Australian rules footballer in the VFL
