= Larry Gordon =

Larry Gordon may refer to:

- Larry Gordon (American football) (1954–1983), American football player
- Larry Gordon (basketball) (born 1987)
- Larry Gordon (ice hockey)
- Larry Gordon (musician) (1945–2021), American musician
- Larry Darnell Gordon, perpetrator of the St. Joseph courthouse shooting
- Lawrence Gordon (producer) (born 1936), known as Larry, American film executive

== See also ==
- Lawrence Gordon (disambiguation)
