= Noah Gordon =

Noah Gordon may refer to:

- Noah Gordon (novelist) (1926–2021), American novelist
- Noah Gordon (singer) (born 1971), American country music singer and songwriter
- Noah Eli Gordon (born 1975), American poet, editor, and publisher
