= Gordillo =

Gordillo is a surname. Notable people with the surname include:

- Cristian Gordillo (born 1990), Mexican footballer
- Elba Esther Gordillo (born 1945), Mexican politician, affiliated to the Institutional Revolutionary Party until 2006
- Gabriel París Gordillo (1910–2008), President of Colombia from May 1957 to August 1958
- Gerardo Gordillo (born 1994), Guatemalan footballer
- John Gordillo, English director and comedian
- Jordi Gordillo (born 1983), Spanish Paralympic swimmer
- José Antonio Gordillo (born 1974), Spanish footballer and manager
- Juan Antonio Gordillo (born 1947), Mexican politician affiliated with the Institutional Revolutionary Party
- Juan Manuel Sánchez Gordillo (born 1952), Spanish politician and labour leader
- Lautaro Gordillo (born 1999), Argentine footballer
- Luis Gordillo (born 1934), Spanish artist and author
- Michel Gordillo (born 1955), Spanish world record aviator
- Mónica Arriola Gordillo (1971–2016), Mexican politician affiliated to the New Alliance Party
- Néstor Gordillo (born 1989), Spanish footballer
- Néstor Octavio Gordillo Castillo (born 1962), Mexican politician affiliated with the National Action Party
- Rafael Gordillo (born 1957), Spanish footballer and sporting director
- Yeison Gordillo (born 1992), Colombian footballer
