= Gavin Gordon =

Gavin Gordon may refer to:

- Gavin Gordon (actor) (1901–1983), American film actor
- Gavin Gordon (composer) (1901–1970), Scottish composer, singer, actor
- Gavin Gordon (footballer) (born 1979), English footballer
- Gavin Gordon (rugby league) (born 1978), Irish rugby league footballer
