= Harry Gordon (journalist) =

Australian journalist

Henry Alfred Gordon, CMG, AM (9 November 1925 – 21 January 2015) was an Australian journalist, war correspondent, author, and historian of the Olympic Games. During his journalistic career, he served as editor of The Sun News-Pictorial, and editor-in-chief of The Herald and Weekly Times and Queensland Newspapers. From 1992 to 2015, he was the official historian of the Australian Olympic Committee.

== Early life ==
Gordon was born 9 November 1925 to Harry Gordon, a dockworker, and his wife, Marjorie. As a child, he was taught to tap dance by his mother and to box by his father. He was educated at Elwood Primary School and Melbourne High School, a selective all-boys school. He was a high school middleweight boxing champion.

== Career ==
=== Journalism ===
Gordon began his journalistic career as a teenager, working as a copyboy for The Daily Telegraph when he was 16.

He began working at The Sun News-Pictorial in 1949 as a general reporter. In 1950, at the age of 24, he was sent abroad to cover the Korean War from the front-line. In addition to his own newspaper, his war reports were published in the Adelaide Advertiser, The West Australian and The Courier-Mail. Shocked by the edits made to his reports by the United States' censorship teams, he developed a system of flying to Japan when he had a particularly good story, and dictating his report to a friend who would take a copy to the AAP-Reuters office in Tokyo for direct transmission to Australia; this avoided the reports being censored.

In 1968, he was appointed Editor of The Sun News-Pictorial. He used his newspaper to head a campaign titled 'Declare War on 1034' to reduce car-related fatalities; the number is a reference to the number of road deaths in Victoria in 1969. The campaign was successful and in 1970 the state government introduced a mandatory seatbelt law requiring car users to wear seatbelts; this was the first such law in the world.

He was Chairman of the Australian Associated Press in the 1980s.

=== Olympic Games ===
As a journalist, he covered every Olympic Games between 1952 and 2012: his first Olympics being the Helsinki Games, and his last the London Games.

In 1992, he was appointed the official historian of the Australian Olympic Committee. He wrote a history of Australia's participation in the Olympics. It was titled Australia and the Olympic Games and it was published in 1994. In 2003, he authored The Time of Our Lives: Inside the Sydney Olympics : Australia and the Olympic Games 1994–2002 and in 2014 From Athens With Pride: The Official History of the Australian Olympic Movement, 1894 to 2014.

Gordon played a major role in the naming of streets around the 1956 Melbourne and 2000 Sydney Olympic precincts. The streets were named to honour significant Olympic athletes.

== Later life ==
He was a member of the Australian Football Hall of Fame selection committee from 1996 to 2008.

He was hospitalised two weeks before his death because of respiratory issues. He died in January 2015, aged 89.

== Personal life ==
Gordon married Dorothy Scott in 1951. Together, they had three children; Sally, Michael and John, who all followed Harry into the media (Michael into journalism, John as a news and sports cameraman, and Sally as make-up artist for film and television). He remarried in 1993 to Joy Milner. He is survived by his three children, seven grandchildren and second wife.

He was a supporter of Hawthorn Football Club. He wrote a history of the Australian Football club which was published in 1990.

== Honours ==
- 1980 – appointed Companion of the Order of St Michael and St George (CMG) 'for service to Journalism in Queensland'.
- 1990 – inducted into Sport Australia Hall of Fame
- 1993 – appointed Member of the Order of Australia (AM). in recognition of service to the community and to the promotion of Australian sport.
- 1999 – awarded the Order of Merit, the highest honour awarded by the Australian Olympic Committee.
- 2000 – awarded Australian Sports Medal
- 2001 – awarded the Olympic Order, the highest honour awarded by the International Olympic Committee.
- 2002 – Australian Sports Commission inaugural award for Lifetime Achievement Award in Sports Journalism.
- 2003 – Melbourne Press Club Lifetime Achievement in Journalism Award.
- 2003 – Member of the Melbourne Cricket Ground Media Hall of Fame.
- 2006 – International Society of Olympic Historians ISOH Award – the supreme award in its field, and the second ever made.

== Bibliography ==
- The embarrassing Australian : the story of an Aboriginal warrior. Melbourne : Lansdowne Press, 1962.
- Young men in a hurry : the story of Australia's fastest decade. 2nd ed. Melbourne : Lansdowne, 1961.
- Gold medal girl. Melbourne: Lansdowne, 1965
- Famous Australian news pictures. South Melbourne, Vic. : Macmillan, 1975.
- An eyewitness history of Australia. Adelaide : Rigby, 1976 (Four editions published and won the National Book Council's First Prize for Australian Literature).
- Die like the carp! : the story of the greatest prison escape ever. Stanmore, N.S.W. : Cassell Australia, 1978.
- Bicentennial : an Australian mosaic and 1788 diary. Stafford, Qld. : Sunshine Diaries, 1988
- The hard way : the story of Hawthorn Football Club. Paddington, N.S.W. : Lester-Townsend, 1990.
- The shadow of death : the Holocaust in Lithuania. Lexington, Ky. : University Press of Kentucky, c1992
- Voyage from shame : the Cowra break-out and afterwards. St Lucia, Qld. : University of Queensland Press, 1994.
- Australia and the Olympic Games. St. Lucia, Qld. : University of Queensland Press, 1994.
- Australian Olympic legends. Melbourne : Australia Post, c1998.
- The time of our lives : inside the Sydney Olympics : Australia and the Olympic Games 1994–2002. St Lucia, Qld. : University of Queensland Press, 2003.
- One for all : the story of the Hawthorn Football Club. Melbourne : Wilkinson Publishing, 2009 (with son Michael Gordon)
- From Athens with pride : the official history of the Australian Olympic movement, 1894 to 2014. St Lucia, Queensland University of Queensland Press, 2014
