= William Osceola Gordon =

American judge

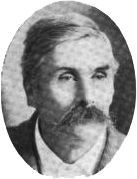
- Born: October 23, 1837; Maury County, Tennessee, U.S.
- Died: December 31, 1914 (aged 77); Columbia, Tennessee, U.S.
- Education: Jackson College
- Occupation: Jurist
- Political party: Democratic Party
- Spouse: Virginia C. Graham
- Children: 1 son, 1 daughter
- Parent(s): Powhatan Gordon; Caroline Coleman
- Relatives: R. H. Gordon (brother)

Judge William Osceola Gordon (1837–1914) was an American judge.

== Early life ==
William Osceola Gordon was born on October 23, 1837, in Maury County, Tennessee. He was a direct descendant of Pocahontas. His father, Powhatan Gordon, was a farmer and politician. His middle name, 'Osceola', comes from Osceola, a Native American chief that his father fought against in the Second Seminole War.

Gordon graduated from Jackson College. He was admitted to the bar in 1885.

== Career ==
Gordon was a jurist. He served on the county court from 1902 to 1904.

Gordon was a member of the Democratic Party. He campaigned for Thomas Clarke Rye to become Governor of Tennessee.

== Personal life and death ==
Gordon married Virginia C. Graham on May 3, 1859. They had a son, Powhatan Graham Gordon, and a daughter, Louisa, who married Willis E. Jones. He was a Freemason, and a member of Royal Arcanum.

Gordon died on December 31, 1914, in Columbia, Tennessee. His funeral was held at St. John's Episcopal Church.
