= Yekutiel Gordon =

Lithuanian Orthodox rabbi

Yekutiel ben Yehudah Leib Gordon (Hebrew: יקותיאל גורדון; died after 1742) was a Kabbalist and physician from Vilna, and one of the main disciples of Rabbi Moshe Chaim Luzzatto (1707–1746). As such, he was one of the main conduits of Luzzatto's teachings from Padua to Eastern Europe.

Gordon came to Italy in order to study medicine at the University of Padua. It is there that he met Luzzatto, under whom he learned Torah and Kabbalah. He considered leaving his medical studies in order to dedicate himself to the study of Kabbalah; however, Luzzatto urged him not to; he insisted that his maggid or mystical teacher wished for Gordon to be successful in both areas.

Gordon was thus unwittingly the initial source of publicity of Luzzatto's maggid: he wrote an account to his teacher in Vilna, thus initiating much of the controversy that surrounded Luzzatto. While he was greatly pained by this matter, the maggid insisted that these developments were heaven-sent.

Gordon was one of the transcribers of Luzzatto's writings. Following Luzzatto's death and the dissolution of his followers, Gordon returned to Poland, where he established a group of his own which separated itself from the general community and adopted its own dress.
