= Steve Gordon (rugby league) =

Australian rugby league footballer

Personal information
- Born: 17 September 1986 (age 38); Dubbo, New South Wales, Australia

Playing information
- Position: Fullback, Centre, Wing
Club
Years	Team	Pld	T	G	FG	P
2007	Newcastle Knights	2	0	0	0	0
- Source: As of 8 February 2019

Steve Gordon (born 17 September 1986) is an Australian former professional rugby league footballer who last played for the Western Suburbs Rosellas of the Newcastle Rugby League. He previously played in the National Rugby League for the Newcastle Knights.

== Background ==
Gordon was born in Dubbo, New South Wales. Gordon played his junior football for Dubbo and the Western Suburbs Rosellas before being signed by the Newcastle Knights.

== Playing career ==
In round 8 of the 2007 NRL season, he made his first grade debut for Newcastle against the Canterbury-Bankstown Bulldogs. Gordon played one further game for Newcastle which came in round 11 against Brisbane which saw Newcastle lose 71–6. After being released by Newcastle, Gordon played in the local competition with Western Suburbs and Central Newcastle. In 2024, Gordon faced a potential ban of twelve weeks after it was alleged he stomped on an opponent whilst playing for Raymond Terrace in the Newcastle A-Grade competition.
