= Robert J. Gordon (lawyer) =

American trial lawyer

Robert J. Gordon is an American trial lawyer.

He is Weitz & Luxenberg’s chief trial lawyer and partner. He has tried 70 mass tort cases involving asbestos, Vioxx, Rezulin, and silicone gel breast implants, obtaining jury verdicts totaling $405,741,511 with a case average of $5,796,307. He lectures nationally and has published numerous articles on various aspects of complex litigation.

Formerly an assistant district attorney in the felony jury unit of the Philadelphia District Attorney’s Office and an adjunct professor at Temple University, Mr. Gordon was honored by the National Law Journal in 1995 as one of the top forty attorneys in the country under the age of 40.

In December 2010, Mr. Gordon was awarded Lawyer of the Year - Mass Tort Litigation by New York Magazine.

In July 2009, Mr. Gordon was a finalist for The Public Justice Foundation's Trial Lawyer of the Year award for his work on In re: MTBE, MDL 1358.

Mr. Gordon graduated with honors from George Washington University Law School in 1980. He received his B.A. with high distinction from University of Michigan in 1977.

Mr. Gordon has been appointed to the following committees:

- Co-lead Counsel, MTBE Litigation (MDL 1358)
- Plaintiff’s Steering Committee and Co-chair of the Science Subcommittee, Breast Implant Litigation (MDL 926)
- Plaintiff’s Steering Committee, Rezulin Litigation (MDL 1348)
- Co-liaison Counsel to the PSC and MDL, New York State Rezulin Litigation
- Liaison Advisory Committee and Compensation Subcommittee, Baycol Litigation (MDL 1431)
- The Scientific and Medical Integrity Committee and the ATLA List Committee, Association of Trial Lawyers of America
- Committee on Tort Litigation, Association of the Bar of the City of New York

Mr. Gordon is admitted in New York and New Jersey. He is also admitted in U.S. District Court - Eastern District of Pennsylvania, District of New Jersey, Southern District of New York, and Eastern District of New York. Mr. Gordon is additionally admitted in U.S. Supreme Court and U.S. Court of Appeals - Third Circuit.
