= Clarence C. Gordon =

- Born: July 26, 1928; Seattle, Washington
- Died: July 12, 1981 (aged 62); Winthrop, Washington
- Education: University of Washington (B.S., 1956), Washington State University (Ph.D., 1960)

Clarence C. "Clancy" Gordon was born in Seattle, Washington, on July 26, 1928. After earning his bachelor's of science from the University of Washington in 1956 and his Ph.D. from Washington State University in 1960, Gordon became a professor in the Department of Botany at the University of Montana. Gordon, an outspoken and influential, albeit at times controversial, environmental activist in Montana during the 1960s and 1970s, died on July 12, 1981, at the age of 53 after a two-year battle with cancer.

== Early life and education ==
Clarence Gordon was born in Seattle, Washington, on July 26, 1928. While growing up in Seattle during the Great Depression and World War II, Gordon's family had very little money and he was in and out of school during most of his youth. He favored hunting, fishing and other outdoors activities over spending time in the classroom, and this preference often resulted in suspensions and even expulsion. Despite these common absences and disciplinary problems, Gordon graduated from public high school in Seattle at the age of seventeen. He spent the next four years of his life as a commercial fisherman in Alaska, and then was drafted for a brief stint in the Korean War. Upon release from his military service, Gordon returned to commercial fishing until he met his future wife, Nancy Ward, while taking vocational training in seamanship. Deciding that commercial fishing would not be a favorable career for a married man with a family, Gordon enrolled at the University of Washington in Seattle.

After two years in pre-medicine at the University of Washington, Gordon switched his major to Mycology, the study of fungus, graduating with a bachelor's degree in 1956. Gordon continued his education when he was accepted for graduate study at Washington State University in Pullman, where he remained until receiving a Ph.D. in Plant Pathology in 1960.

== Career ==
After earning his doctorate, Gordon joined the faculty at the University of Montana in Missoula that same year as a professor in the Department of Botany. During his time as a professor at the university, Clancy Gordon was heavily involved with advancing the status of Environmental Studies on campus, founding the Environmental Studies laboratory in 1963 and helping to establish the Environmental Studies Graduate Program in 1970. He served as the first director of the new graduate program from 1970 to 1975. Gordon was a prolific author and researcher, often writing numerous articles and participating in a variety of research projects simultaneously. He was also a respected teacher who was able to communicate his message of environmental activism though informal and unconventional methods of instruction.

Clancy Gordon was equally active in the environmental movement outside of his capacity as a professor of Botany and Environmental Studies. Considered an expert on the effects of fluoride emissions and other air pollutants on plants, Gordon was an important witness in many legal cases and adversary hearings brought against major polluters during the 1960s and 1970s. His work involved him in controversial cases across Montana, the United States, Canada and even Europe, and pitted him squarely against such powerful corporations as the Montana Power Company, the Anaconda Company, Cominco, ASARCO, the Reynolds Metal Company, and the Virginia Electric and Power Company. Due to his activism, Gordon soon became a member of the Environmental Defense Fund's board of trustees. His commitment to environmental activism earned him notoriety among the business community as a troublemaker, but his consistent professionalism, sense of humor and dedicated research also gained him the respect and loyalty of his colleagues, students and many of the public citizens he worked to protect from the dangers of pollution and environmental degradation.

Clancy Gordon died after a two-year battle with cancer on July 12, 1981, at the age of 53 in Winthrop, Washington, while visiting his sister.
