= Bruce Gordon =

Bruce Gordon may refer to:

== Businessmen ==
- Bruce Gordon (businessman) (born 1929), Australian owner of regional broadcaster WIN Television
- Bruce S. Gordon (born 1946), American business executive and former president of NAACP

== Performers ==
- Bruce Gordon (actor/director) (before 1890–after 1949), South African star and director of 1919's The First Men in the Moon
- Bruce Gordon (American actor) (1916–2011), character performer who portrayed Frank Nitti on The Untouchables
- Bruce Gordon (musician) (born 1968), Canadian bassist and member of I Mother Earth

== Scholars ==
- Bruce Gordon (historian) (born 1962), Canadian professor of ecclesiastical history
- Bruce L. Gordon (born 1963), Canadian philosopher and Intelligent Design proponent

== Others ==
- Bruce Gordon (1878–1960), South African on List of Border representative cricketers
- Bruce Gordon (police officer) (1962–2017), Canadian director of investigations in Saskatoon

== Characters ==
- Bruce Gordon (Eclipso), supervillain in DC Comics 1963 House of Secrets

== See also ==
- Gordie Bruce (1919–1997), Canadian ice hockey player forward
