= Oliver Gordon =

Oliver Gordon may refer to:

- Oliver Gordon (Royal Navy officer) (1896–1973), World War II officer and prisoner of war
- Oliver Gordon (rugby league) (born 1992)
- Oliver Gordon, stage name of English actor and cricketer Oliver Battcock (1903–1970)

== See also ==
- Gordon Oliver (disambiguation)
