= Phil Gordon =

Phil or Philip Gordon may refer to:

- Phil Gordon (actor) (1916–2010), American character actor and dialect coach
- Phil Gordon (poker player) (born 1970), American poker player
- Phil Gordon (politician) (born 1951), ex-mayor of Phoenix, Arizona
- Philip B. Gordon (1885–1948), American Indian Catholic priest
- Philip H. Gordon (born 1962), American government official
