= William Francis Gordon =

English coal-owner and railway director (1820–1901)

William Francis Gordon (1820–1901) was an English coal-master and railway director active in the West Midlands.

== Life ==
He was the son of the Rev. William Gordon (died 1857) of Christ Church, West Bromwich, and his wife Louisa Jervis, daughter of Thomas Jervis. His brother Robert Gordon (1830–1914) was a cleric, rector of Hammerwich. His sister Louisa married the ironmaster Henry Smith.

== Coal and rail ==
Gordon's mining interests included (1874) Knutton Colliery and Old Oak Colliery. He took a mining lease at Knutton, covering most of the Knutton estate, for 21 years at a minimum annual royalty of £1000. With the Stanier and Sneyd families, he gave money towards a school and church buildings in Knutton. The Rev. Otho Steele, brought in as vicar at the Knutton chapelry and involved in the fundraising, moved on to Wolstanton. (Knutton chapel was not well endowed.) There he raised funds for a new church built at Porthill, to which Gordon contributed a window.

In 1864, Gordon owned mining rights at New Bucknall. He put his Lawn Colliery at Bucknall on the market in 1870, anticipating the completion of the Longton, Adderley Green and Bucknall railway.

In 1874 Gordon chaired a meeting to arrange a takeover of interests of C. & J. May in the Sneyd Colliery, Burslem.

Gordon was a director of the North Staffordshire Railway for much of his later life.

== Residences ==
In the 1840s, Gordon and his wife lived at Spon House, outside West Bromwich, on a heath. Thomas Bache Salter of Salters lived there in the following decade.

Gordon was living in Oak Hill, Stoke-on-Trent, when he bought St Chad's House, Lichfield, after the death in 1876 of the physician Charles Holland FRS. He changed its name back to an earlier one, Stowe House. He lived there for the rest of his life.

== Local politics ==
Gordon was a Staffordshire Justice of the Peace from 1876, and sat on the Lichfield City Council. He was Mayor of Lichfield in 1880–1.

== Death ==
William Francis Gordon died at home at Stowe House on 11 September 1901, at age 81. He left an estate with personalty valued at £172,705.

== Family ==
Gordon married in 1844 Anna Matilda May, daughter of Charles Hughes May of Whittington, Derbyshire and aunt of Phil May. Charles Hughes May was a coal-master, at Sneyd Colliery. Living at Spon House, West Bromwich, they lost their two infants, William Alexander and Matilda Louisa, in August 1847.

Of their other children:

- Anna Louisa (died 1929 at age 76, the eldest surviving daughter), married in 1874 Henry Copson Peake, eldest son of E. C. Peake of Chaseley, Rugeley. He was manager of the Walsall Wood Colliery Co.; succeeded by their son F. G. Peake. She died at home at St John's House, Lichfield, survived by three sons and three daughters.

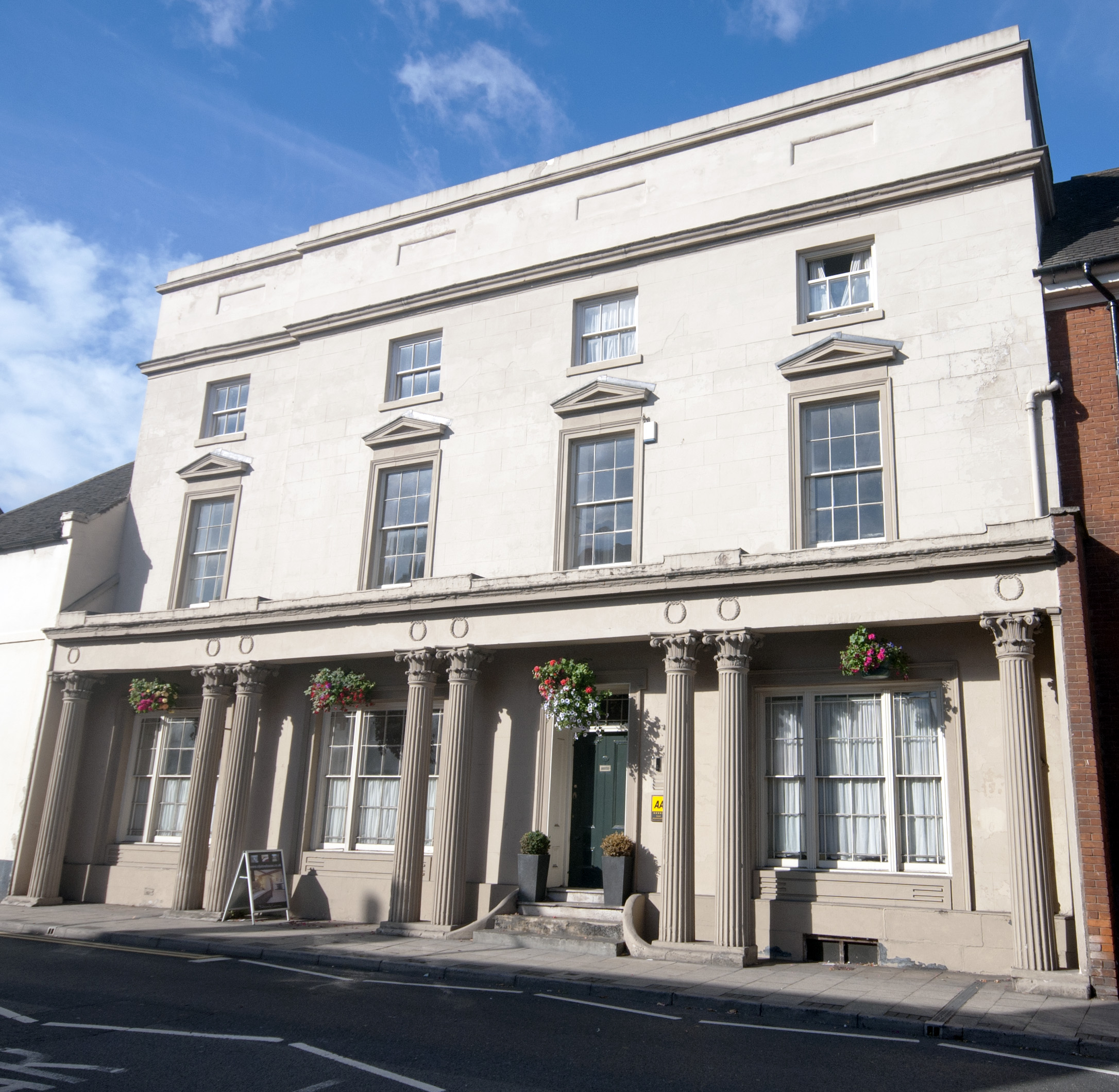
St John's House, Lichfield, residence of Anna Louisa Peake

- William Oliver Gordon (died 1907, aged 57, the eldest surviving son), married Eliza Clara. He was one of twins, born 1848, the other being Francis Harry.
- John Herbert Gordon.
- The Rev. Alexander Gordon (born 1854 at Handsworth, fourth son), graduated B.A. at Trinity College, Oxford in 1876. He was appointed curate at Westham, Dorset in 1887. He was curate at Woodlands, Dorset, moving to become rector of Brixton Deverill in 1897. He was father of Godfrey Jervis Gordon.
- Frances Alice, married the Rev. Julian Edward Chichester Patterson and was mother of Julian Patterson RN.
- George Gordon, went to New Zealand.
- Charles Gordon, died 1888 in Basel, aged 33.
- Robert Gordon, married in 1894 as her second husband Caroline Dyson, daughter of Major Dyson of the 3rd Dragoon Guards, of Denne Hill, Kent. She was previously married in 1881 to Marwood Shuttlewood Yeatman (died 1891), son of Henry Farr Yeatman II. Robert's death after his father, and before his mother, led to a court case in 1903.
- Colin Gordon MB, youngest son, married in 1894 Ethel Houghton. She was the daughter of Charles James Houghton, of Leyton, Essex and Grand Canary, and his wife Eliza Boxer.

Anna Matilda Gordon died on 29 December 1903, at Bournemouth.
