= Henry Gordon (given name) =

Other names
- Related names: Harry Gordon

Henry Gordon is a given name.

Notable people bearing this name include:

- Henry Gordon Bennett
- Henry Gordon McMorran
- Henry Gordon Rice
- Henry Gordon Wells
- Harry Gordon Frankfurt
- Harry Gordon Johnson
- Harry Gordon Selfridge
