= Powhatan Gordon =

American politician

- Born: November 15, 1802; Nashville, Tennessee, U.S.
- Died: January 29, 1879 (aged 76); Bryan, Texas, U.S.
- Occupation: Politician
- Political party: Democratic Party; Know Nothing
- Spouse: Caroline Mary Coleman
- Children: 11
- Parent(s): John Gordon; Dorothea Cross

Major Powhatan Gordon (1802–1879) was an American farmer and politician. He served in the Tennessee Senate in 1842 and 1845. During his tenure, he proposed a bill for the creation of Lewis County, Tennessee. By 1854, his bid for Congress as a member of the Know Nothing party was unsuccessful.

== Early life ==
Powhatan Gordon was born on November 15, 1802, in Nashville, Tennessee. His father, John Gordon, built John Gordon House in Williamsport, Tennessee.

== Career ==
Gordon was a corn farmer in Williamsport, Tennessee. He sold his corn in Louisiana.

During the Second Seminole War of 1835–1842, he served as a Major in the First Tennessee Mounted Militia. He subsequently served in the Mexican–American War of 1846–1848. When Veracruz was occupied by the United States, he sold goods in the city.

Gordon joined the Democratic Party. He served in the Tennessee Senate in 1842 and 1845. It was Gordon who proposed a bill for the creation of Lewis County, Tennessee, out of parts of Hickman County, Lawrence County, Wayne County, and Maury County, naming it after explorer Meriwether Lewis.

Gordon joined the Know Nothing party and ran for the United States House of Representatives in 1854, but he lost the race.

== Personal life and death ==
Gordon married Caroline Mary Coleman on June 26, 1828. They had eleven children, including Judge William Osceola Gordon and state representative R. H. Gordon. He died on January 29, 1879, in Bryan, Texas.
