= Mervyn Gordon =

British medical microbiologist (1872–1953)

Mervyn Henry Gordon (22 June 1872 – 26 July 1953) was a British medical microbiologist and immunologist who researched bacteria and viruses associated with human disease, most notably Streptococcus (scarlet fever), Neisseria meningitidis (meningitis), mumps virus and poxviruses including variola virus (smallpox). He also studied airborne transmission of respiratory organisms. Apart from the First World War, he spent his entire career at the pathology department of St Bartholomew's Hospital, London (1898–1937). He was appointed CMG (1917), received the CBE (1919), and was an elected fellow of the Royal Society (1924). His obituary in The Times describes him as "one of the leading bacteriologists of his generation".

== Education and career ==
Mervyn Gordon was born on 22 June 1872 at Harting in Sussex, where his father, Henry Doddridge Gordon, was the rector. His mother, Elizabeth Oke Gordon, was an author who wrote a biography of her father, the well-known geologist William Buckland. His maternal uncle, Frank Buckland, was a naturalist who had trained in medicine. Mervyn Gordon was one of the middle children of a large family.

He attended the Dragon School in Oxford and then Marlborough College, where he failed to distinguish himself. He read biology, specialising in physiology, at Keble College, Oxford graduating in 1894, and then studied medicine at St Bartholomew's Hospital in London, gaining MB BChir (1898), BSc (1901) and MD degrees (1903), all from Oxford, but never entered general practice.

In 1898, he took a position in St Bartholomew's department of pathology, initially under Emmanuel Klein – a family friend – where he remained for the rest of his peacetime career, rising to assistant pathologist in 1908, and succeeding Klein as the lecturer in bacteriology in 1919. In 1909 Gordon became one of the founding members of the Army Pathological Advisory Committee. During the First World War, he was assigned to the Royal Army Medical Corps at Millbank, with the rank of Lieutenant Colonel, and continued to advise the army after the war. In 1923 he resigned from the St Bartholomew's staff, being given the honorary position of consulting bacteriologist, but continued to research at the department for the Medical Research Council. He retired in 1937 but retained the position of consulting bacteriologist, and continued to publish papers until the year of his death.

He was elected a fellow of the Royal Society in 1924, was appointed CMG (1917), also receiving the CBE (1919), and in 1936 was awarded an honorary LLD degree by the University of Edinburgh.

== Research ==
Gordon carried out experiments on the airborne transmission of respiratory organisms in the House of Commons in 1904–5, expanding on research by Carl Flügge, who had shown that respiratory droplets were projected into the air when speaking, as well as coughing or sneezing. These included Gordon orating Shakespeare in the empty debating chamber after having inoculated his mouth and throat with a nonpathogenic bacterial species, collecting the dispersed bacteria on agar plates. He used the same method to assess streptococcal dispersal during actual debates, and also studied the distribution of bacteria transported on footwear from the exterior of the building. His results were the subject of a 212-page Blue Book of 1906, and are described by the bacteriologist Lawrence P. Garrod as a "landmark" in research in this field. He also researched the transmission of enteric fever via the water supply, including its prevention by chlorination, following work by R. J. Reece.

With F. W. Andrewes and T. J. Horder, he studied Streptococcus, using biochemical tests to divide the genus into three main groups, S. pyogenes, S. viridans (which they named S. salivarius) and S. faecalis. He worked further on the classification of S. pyogenes, using bacterial binding to agglutinin to define three subtypes, in work extended by Andrewes and F. Griffith. He proposed, but could not prove, that Streptococcus causes scarlet fever. He also studied the classification of Staphylococcus (with Andrewes) and Neisseria, again successfully using biochemical tests.

In the 1900s, he studied meningococcal meningitis (then known as cerebrospinal fever), caused by the bacterium N. meningitidis or meningococcus; he continued this work during the First World War in the Royal Army Medical Corps, directing a group including T. G. M. Hine and others. Gordon showed that the outbreaks in the barracks were caused by an increase in the proportion of people carrying N. meningitidis, owing to overcrowding and inadequate ventilation. With his colleagues, he identified four serological types of the bacterium, and attempted therapy using specific immune sera. These results were published by the Medical Research Council in a "classic" report of 1920.

After 1923, Gordon switched his research focus to viruses, initially working on the poxviruses, variola (smallpox) and vaccinia, on which he published a "classic" report in 1925. He studied vaccinia in a rabbit model, including studying immune responses, and developed a method of diagnosing smallpox (both variola major and minor) using immune serum, the earliest accurate and rapid diagnostic technique for this virus. Other viral diseases he studied include measles and mumps; he was among the first to infect a non-human animal with mumps virus, infecting monkeys by introducing the virus intracerebrally. He later researched Hodgkin lymphoma, which he concluded was caused by a virus. Although his conclusions were challenged by his contemporaries, many cases are now known to be associated with Epstein–Barr virus.

== Personal life ==
In 1916, he married Mildred Olive (née Power; died 1953), whose father, William Henry Power, had been the Local Government Board's chief medical officer; the marriage did not result in any children. Mildred also worked for the Local Government Board, as an inspector, before and during their marriage.

Gordon died on 26 July 1953 at East Molesey in Surrey.

== Selected publications ==
Report

- M. H. Gordon. Studies of the viruses of vaccinia and variola. (HM Stationery Office; 1925)

Research papers

- M. H. Gordon (1933). Remarks on Hodgkin's disease: a pathogenic agent in the glands, and its application in diagnosis. The British Medical Journal 1 (3771): 641–44 doi:10.1136/bmj.1.3771.641
- M. H. Gordon (1918). Identification of the meningococcus. Journal of Hygiene 17 (2–3): 290–315 doi:10.1017/S0022172400007166
