= Richard Gordon (photographer) =

American photographer

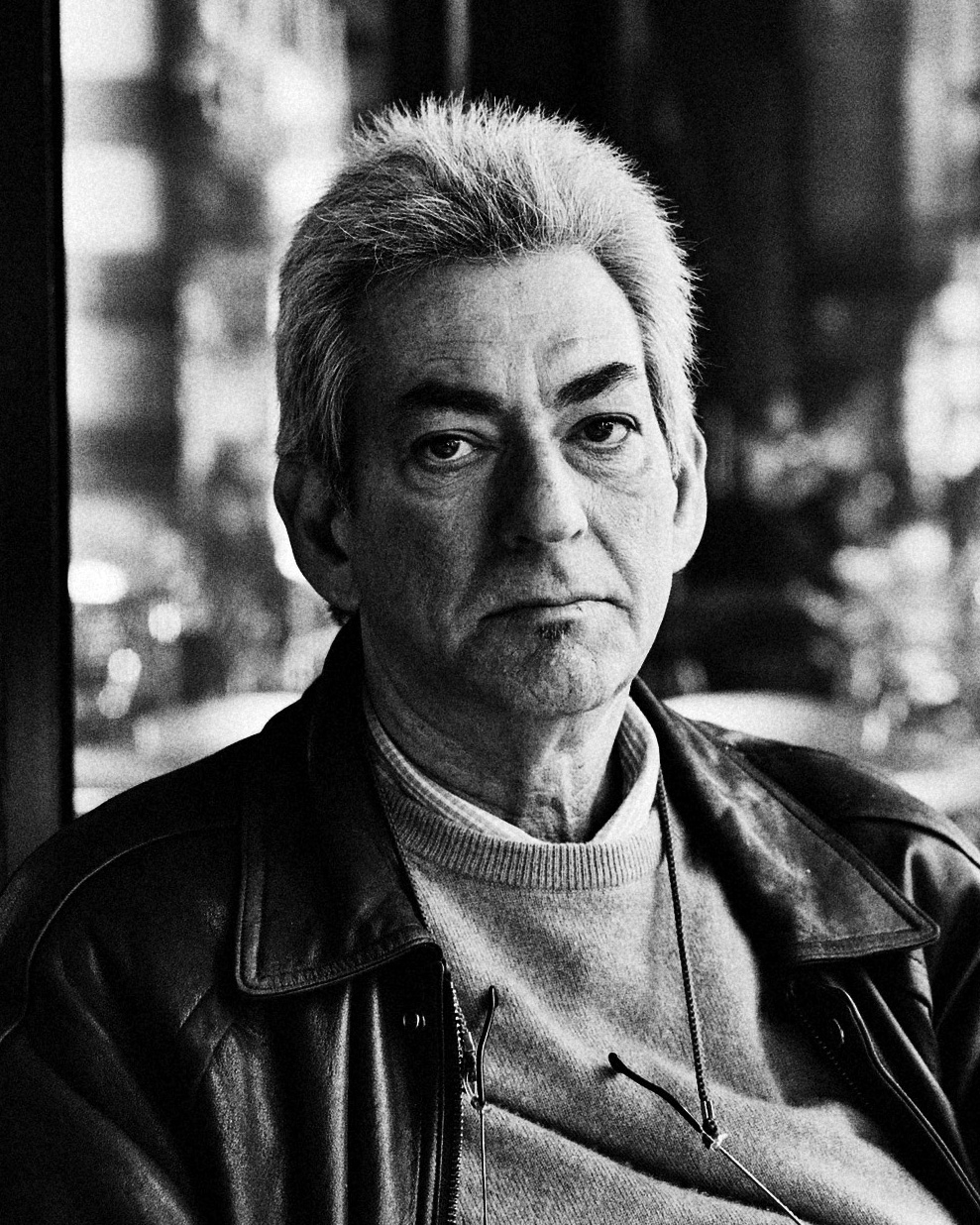
- Richard Gordon, 2006, SFMOMA
- Born: June 6, 1945; Chicago, Illinois
- Died: October 6, 2012 (aged 67); Berkeley, California
- Known for: Photography

Richard Gordon (June 6, 1945 – October 6, 2012) was an American photographer who photographed all over America for more than 40 years.

== Life and work ==
Gordon was educated at University of Chicago (1963–67).

His book American Surveillance (2009) takes a visually intricate, and often witty look at the role and surveillance and the difference between observation and electronic scrutiny.

He wrote reviews of photography for various publications including for the photo-eye website.

Gordon conceived and then executed The Firestorm Family Portrait Project. Together with Chris Johnson, other local professional photographers, California College of the Arts, local photo labs and Kodak, the project was about replacing, or a new beginning of, a family photo archive for those who lost their possessions in the Oakland firestorm of 1991.

In 2012 Gordon had group shows at the Santa Barbara Museum of Art Portrayal Betrayal, the Robert Koch Gallery (San Francisco) Inside/Outside, and a one-man show at the Thomas Welton Stanford Art Gallery.

Counting The House is one of the books illustrated in photo photo photo books, 802 photo books from the M.+M. Auer Collection, 2007 Editions M+M (Switzerland).

Gordon was a part-time instructor at City College of San Francisco, Stanford University Continuing Studies and other San Francisco Bay Area colleges.

He lived in Berkeley, California.

== Death ==
He died on October 6, 2012, of pancreatic cancer.

== Reception ==
Kenneth Baker on the 2012 group show: Inside/Outside,

Various other window views follow, the most conceptually striking, Richard Gordon's "Robert Frank's Window, Bleecker Street" (1984)

A. D. Coleman wrote of One More for the Road "Still photography has its own versions of road movies and buddy pictures, but few of the latter have made it into book form")

Judith Hoffberg, the founder and editor of Umbrella, said in her review of Gordon's One More For the Road,

Yet this is more than photographic interest, this is a book of a friendship, personal, yet universal,....that is clear to all us human beings.

David Elliot (long time film critic) in the Chicago Sun-Times on Gordon's Meta Photographs: The book opens with a remark from the writer Bruno Schulz:

Reality is as thin as paper and betrays with all its cracks its imitative character." Gordon has taken that rather gnomic attitude and amended it into a series of conscious contemplations, his pictures dealing with all the ways in which people use pictures, see themselves as pictures, become part of the pictorial processes. And in his best work, he slices through that thin paper of reality to reveal things that are not so much imitative as indicative.

Tom Gitterman on Meta Photographs:

As the title suggests the works are often photographs about photography. Gordon's images are a part of an early discourse about how society has used photography as a means of representation. Though he is theorizing about the medium, his images are often witty, sometimes humorous, while formally exploring the exotic of the everyday.

David Levi-Strauss on Gordon's political pictures from a review of an exhibit at SF Camerawork, 1984.

Gordon's images subvert the hidden ideological agenda of mainstream photojournalism.....The hidden agenda is not a tightly controlled conspiracy but, in effect, is the result of all our public assumptions and perceptions. Gordon's images are often saved from the easy characterisation and pat solution by his attention and sensitivity to faces, as in the image of front line supporters at a Jane Byrne rally in February 1983. Gordon's faces ae seldom generalisations. Gordon is at his best when the ambiguities are active and the frames are filled to the corners with questions rather than answers, causing the viewer to think, rather than to accept or reject.

In a Vicki Goldberg review in The New York Times on July 21, 1991 of an exhibit at Staley-Wise in New York of Women Are Beautiful from Esquire she wrote,

The youth and glamour predominant in this show are gently spoofed in Richard Gordon's 32 Marilyns: Miss Artichoke Festival, San Francisco.....These and 15 more like them, not one of whom resembles the original in the least, were hired to pass out pieces of artichoke at the festival to commemorate that great moment in 1947 when Marilyn, still largely unknown, became the first Miss Artichoke in history.

== Publications ==
- Meta Photographs. Chimaera, 1978
- One More for the Road. Flâneur Bookworks, 1996
- American Surveillance. Chimaera, 2009
- Jessie Reads a Book. Chimaera, 2011
- Notes From the Field. Chimaera, 2012

== Awards ==
- 1982: N.E.A. Fellowship

== Collections ==
Gordon's work is held in the following permanent collections:

- San Francisco Museum of Modern Art, San Francisco, CA
- J. Paul Getty Museum, Los Angeles, CA
- Corcoran Gallery of Art, Washington, D.C.
- Rosenwald Rare Book Collection
- Library of Congress, Washington, D.C.
- Museum of Fine Arts, Houston
- Wagstaff Collection, Los Angeles
- Santa Barbara Museum of Art, Santa Barbara, CA
