= Nottington =

Village in Dorset, England

Coordinates: 50.642827°N 2.480612°W

- Location within Dorset
- Population: 5,458
- OS grid reference: SY6611382681
- Unitary authority: Dorset
- Ceremonial county: Dorset
- Region: South West
- Country: England
- Sovereign state: United Kingdom
- Post town: Weymouth
- Postcode district: DT3
- Dialling code: 01305
- Police: Dorset
- Fire: Dorset and Wiltshire
- Ambulance: South Western
- UK Parliament: South Dorset

Nottington is a village within the Dorset unitary authority area of the county of Dorset, England. Its nearest town is Weymouth, which lies approximately 2.6 miles (4.2 km) to the south-east.

Nottington used to possess a spa which was popular with "the quality from aristocratic Weymouth", who "flocked to drink the waters" which at the time were claimed to be beneficial for "eruptive complaints, scrophula, and loss of appetite." In 1905 Sir Frederick Treves noted that the spa was "deserted" and "no longer rings with the laughter and jests of the seekers after appetite", but described the still-existing pump room as "an octagonal building of three stories, with something of the aspect of an enormous dove-cot." The pump room still stands today, and is known as The Spa House.

== Notable people ==
- Richard Augustus Tucker Steward
- Gabriel Tucker Steward
- Gabriel Steward
