= Bernard Gordon =

Bernard Gordon may refer to:

- Bernard Gordon (soldier) (1891–1963), Australian recipient of the Victoria Cross
- Bernard Gordon (writer) (1918–2007), American screenwriter
- Bernard G. Gordon (1916–1978), New York politician
- Bernard Marshall Gordon (born 1927), American inventor and philanthropist

== See also ==
- Bernard de Gordon (died 1330), French doctor and professor of medicine
- Bernard Gordon Lennox (1932–2017), British Army officer
- Lord Bernard Gordon-Lennox (1878–1914), British Army officer
