= David Gordon (television executive) =

- Born: David Sorrell Gordon; September 11, 1941 (age 84); Watford, Herts, England
- Occupation: Consultant
- Website: Gordon Advisory LLC

David Gordon (born September 11, 1941) has had a varied career in media and the arts. Now a consultant, he is a former chief executive of Independent Television News (ITN) and the Economist Group. He became Secretary of the Royal Academy in 1996.

Gordon studied Politics, Philosophy and Economics at Balliol College at the University of Oxford.

Gordon is a former chairman of the Contemporary Art Society and trustee of the Tate Gallery.

In 2002, he became director and CEO of the Milwaukee Art Museum, a post from which he retired in 2008.
