= Nachi Gordon =

American entrepreneur

- Born: January 11, 1995 (age 31); Five Towns, New York, U.S.
- Known for: Meaningful Minute
- Spouse: Shana Katz (m. 2018)

Nachi Gordon (born January 11, 1995) is an American entrepreneur and the founder of Meaningful Minute, a platform that delivers daily inspirational videos. Before founding Meaningful Minute, he was notable for being one of the youngest agents to sign an NBA player.

== Life and career ==
Gordon was born and raised in Five Towns, New York. His father, Larry Gordon, is the publisher and editor of the Five Towns Jewish Times. He attended Yeshiva of Far Rockaway for high school, where he was aimed to pursue a career as a lawyer or basketball agent. He took his state tests in 11th grade and skipped 12th grade. He then attended college, focusing on gaining practical experience rather than academic accolades. After completing training, Gordon became certified by the National Basketball Players Association. As a sports agent, he represented players in contract negotiations with NBA teams and endorsement deals with brands. Despite being younger and less experienced than many of his peers, Gordon achieved success in the industry. He signed several clients, including one who secured an NBA contract, and spent significant time at Madison Square Garden with New York Knicks officials.

== Meaningful Minute ==
Gordon later shifted his focus to creating Meaningful Minute, a platform designed to provide short, impactful videos of inspiration and encouragement from well-known speakers. Initially, he worked alone, creating content late into the night using a laptop and headphones. The project began as a way for Gordon to explore and share Torah-centric inspiration. The platform has seen significant growth since its inception, expanding into a company with seven employees, an app, and a podcast network. The network focuses on making Torah content accessible and engaging for a broad audience, leveraging modern technology and media platforms to reach its goals. Meaningful Minute's content is widely shared on social media platforms, particularly WhatsApp. As of January 2018, the platform has 17,000 subscribers. In February 2019, Gordon published the book Meaningful Minute, written together with Yisroel Besser and published by Mesorah Publications. The book features short messages designed to provide quick bursts of inspiration and insight for personal growth.

Gordon, together with Momo Bauman, is a co-host of the Meaningful People Podcast, a weekly podcast featuring influential Jewish figures. Notable guests have included Nissim Black, Ben Shapiro, and Jamie Geller.

== Personal life ==
Gordon, a redheaded Jew, married Shana Katz in 2018. He lives in Lawrence, Nassau County, New York, where he learns in yeshiva in the morning.
