= William McD. Gordon =

William McDougall Gordon, MBE (1899 – 27 June 1950) was born in Peterhead, Aberdeenshire, Scotland, the son of William Gordon and Margaret McDougall.

Gordon was a cabinet maker and the town treasurer for Peterhead. Gordon served as provost of Peterhead from 1946 to 1950. He was also a justice of the peace, and received the Order of the British Empire. Gordon retired as provost in April 1950 due to poor health and died very shortly after on 27 June 1950.
