= Pamela Gordon (American politician) =

American politician

Member of New Hampshire House of Representatives for Rockingham 29
- In office 2014 – May 29, 2018

Personal details
- Party: Democratic
- Education: Springfield College

Pamela (Pam) Gordon is an American politician. She was a member of the New Hampshire House of Representatives and represented Rockingham 29th district from 2014 to 2018.
