= Julian Patterson =

Rear-Admiral Julian Patterson OBE
- Born: 6 May 1884
- Died: 23 June 1972 (aged 88)
- Military career
- Allegiance: United Kingdom
- Branch: Royal Navy
- Service years: 1904-1933
- Rank: Rear-Admiral
- Conflicts: First World War
- Awards: OBE

Rear-Admiral Julian Francis Chichester Patterson OBE (1884–1972) was a senior Royal Navy officer.

== Naval career ==
Born on 6 May 1884, he was the son of the Rev. Julian Edward Chichester Patterson, rector of Pitchford, married in 1883 to Frances Alice Gordon, daughter of William Francis Gordon, mayor of Lichfield in 1880.

Julian Patterson was educated at Bedford School and at Britannia Royal Naval College. He received his first commission in the Royal Navy in 1904 and served in the Royal Navy during the First World War, serving at the Battle of Jutland in 1916. Between April 1931 and August 1932 he commanded HMS Hood, flagship of the Royal Navy's Battle Cruiser Squadron

Rear Admiral Julian Patterson retired from the Royal Navy in 1933. He died on 23 June 1972.
