= Max J. L. Schultze =

Max Julius Leopold Schultze (c. 1881–13 April 1955) was a herring exporter and Labour politician who served as Provost of Peterhead from 1936 to 1940. He was born in Stettin and moved to Peterhead with his parents in 1885 He married Helen Agnes Spence, daughter of crofter from Lerwick in 1909. He was instrumental in establishing a trading agreement with Soviet Russia in 1932, resulting in the sale of 100,000 barrels of herring. He maintained a good working relationship with Robert Boothby who was the local Conservative MP. As a result of his German background, he stepped down in 1940, but continued to be involved in local politics. His son joined the British army, and decided to change his surname to Saunders, and in May 1941 his father followed suit.
