= Daniel Gordon =

Daniel Gordon may refer to:

- Daniel Gordon (film director), British documentary film director
- Daniel Gordon (artist) (born 1980), American artist
- Daniel Gordon (footballer) (born 1985), Jamaican-German football (soccer) player
- Daniel Gordon (politician) (1821–1907), Canadian ship owner and politician
- Daniel P. Gordon (1969–2017), American politician and construction contractor

== See also ==
- Dan Gordon (disambiguation)
