= Roberts-Gordon LLC =

- Headquarters: Buffalo, New York
- Website: https://www.robertsgordon.com/

Roberts-Gordon LLC is an international manufacturer of HVAC equipment, controls and associated accessories. The company is known for inventing the first commercially produced gas-fired, low-intensity infrared product, CORAYVAC, into the heating industry. Roberts-Gordon LLC was also the first company to patent fully modulating infrared systems with an ULTRAVAC control, a control that allowed building owners to modulate burner input rate with outdoor air temperature in order to match the heating system's input to the building's heating requirement. Multiple heating systems throughout the United States could then able to be monitored from a single desktop.

Roberts-Gordon LLC was acquired by The Sterling Group in July 2014.

In 2023, the company partnered with Reznor and created the Heat Group.
