= Elye Gordon =

Ilya Zinovyevich Gordon (Russian: Илья Зиновьевич Гордон; 15 December [O.S. 2 December] 1907 in Zelenopol, Yekaterinoslav Governorate – 28 February 1989 in Moscow), better known as Elye Gordon (Yiddish: אלי גאָרדאָן), was a Soviet Yiddish author. He was born in Zelenopol, a Jewish agricultural colony in Russia between Yekaterinoslav and Mariupol (today Zaporizhzhia Oblast, Ukraine), but grew up in an orphanage in Berdyansk. Gordon studied at the Yiddish language departments (rabfak) of the Odessa Pedagogical Institute, then Moscow Pedagogical Institute. As a volunteer for the Red Army during World War II, Gordon was twice decorated with the Order of the Red Banner. Wartime themes would also figure in his literary work.

Elye Gordon published stories in almost every Soviet Yiddish periodical, including Yunger Boy-Klang (Kharkov, 1928), Der Shtern (1933); and Heymland (Moscow, 1948). He debuted in book form in 1930 with two works: a novel, Vildgroz (Wild grass), and a collection of short stories, Af griner erd (On the green soil), both published in Moscow. Over the years he published several more novels and numerous short stories, collected in at least 14 books.

- "Vildgroz" (1930)
- "Af griner erd" (1930)
- "Ingul-Boyar" (1935)
- "In a gosregn" (1937)
- "Dray brider" (1938)
- "Dertseylungen un noveln" (1939)
- "In eygene kantn" (the novel "Dray brider" and short stories) (1969)
- "Unter der heyser zun" (1978)
- "Laykht-turem" (1989)
