= Herbert Gordon (footballer) =

Jamaican footballer (1952-2013)

Personal information
- Full name: Herbert Gordon
- Date of birth: 1952
- Place of birth: Kingston, Colony of Jamaica
- Date of death: 17 November 2013 (aged 61)
- Place of death: Kingston, Jamaica
- Position: Forward

Senior career*
Years	Team	Apps	(Gls)
1967–1973	Boys' Town		

International career
- Jamaica
- * Club domestic league appearances and goals

Herbert Gordon (1952 – 17 November 2013) was a Jamaican footballer who primarily played as a forward for Boys' Town. He played for the Jamaica national team, his appearances including World Cup qualifiers in 1976.

Herbert Gordon died on 17 November 2013, aged 61, in Kingston.
