= Bob Gordon (Canadian intelligence) =

Associate Chief of the Canadian Communications Security Establishment, Bob Gordon is a former Canadian Security Intelligence Service (CSIS) agent.

Acting as deputy corporate director of CSIS, Gordon met with President of the North Atlantic Treaty Organization Parliamentary Assembly Doug Bereuter on October 27, 2003.

After moving to CSE, Gordon spoke at the October 2006 Canadian Association for Security and Intelligence Studies conference at the Crowne Plaza Hotel in Ottawa.

Gordon sits on the board of advisors for Carleton University's Canadian Centre of Intelligence and Security Studies program
