= Henry Gordon (preacher) =

Henry Gordon (June 19, 1816 – 1898) was a preacher and church planter who took over Pipestone Baptist Church in 1848 after the founding Pastor R. G. Davis became ill and was no longer able to serve. He also united the Baptist Church of Georgetown and founded Looney Springs (now called Campbell Hill), and the Illinois Association of Free Communion Baptists.

== Early life ==
Henry Gordon was born in Franklin County, Pennsylvania, to George and Nancy Gordon of the Cumberland Valley Gordons. Both of his parents were of Scottish descent, having immigrated to the United States in 1697. His grandfather was actually born during the voyage across the Atlantic Ocean.

Gordon grew up along the Meramec River in Missouri where his father had built and operated a gristmill. At 19 years old, Henry married a young woman by the name of Rebecca Young and received a 100 acres (0.40 km^{2}) of land from his father, which he sold not too long after, moving to southern Illinois just outside Georgetown to a town called Short’s Prairie (now called Steeleville).

== Illinois ==
Shortly after moving to Short’s Prairie, Gordon united the Baptist church of Georgetown and was ordained by the Missionary Baptist Church. However, he soon realized that he was not educated enough to preach the gospel and moved his family to Alton, Illinois, where he attended Shurtleff Theological College.

During this time he also suffered the death of his first-born daughter at the age of two but his wife soon gave birth to a second daughter, Mary, shortly after. While living in Alton they added three sons to their family.

Tragically in 1848 Gordon suffered another loss, that of his wife Rebecca. Approximately a year later though he remarried, to Nancy Hill of Centreville, Illinois, who brought a son with her into their marriage. Their family continued to grow as another five sons were born to them bringing the total to ten children.

Following his graduation from Shurtleff Theological College, Gordon traveled all over southern Illinois and preached. The first ten or twelve years of his ministry were dedicated to the Missionary Baptist Church, which was a member of the Nine Mile Association.

In 1850, he organized at church at Looney Springs (now called Campbell Hill) with nine members. Shortly after starting the Looney Springs church, he announced that the Lord’s Supper would be given. During this time in Illinois history, the churches tended to be very scattered and most wanted to join them for communion. After a lot of debate, Gordon decided that the people were right and let the other churches participate in the communion service. Unfortunately, this caused him to be brought up on charges and he was excluded from the Missionary Baptist Church.

Gordon did not let this get him down however and in 1851 he organized a new Baptist Church of Georgetown and an association that include the new Baptist Church of Georgetown, Looney Springs Baptist Church, Pipestone Baptist Church in Denmark, and Pleasant Ridge Baptist Church and named it the Southern Illinois Association of Free Communion Baptist.

== Later years ==
In 1885, he and his wife moved to Campbell Hill. After about seven years, they moved to Percy, Illinois, and built a house where he died at about the age of 82.

Not believing in egotism or self-praise, Gordon never kept a diary or any record of anything that he accomplished during his ministry. Any information that is known about him has been told by his son.
