= Herbert Gordon (cricketer) =

English cricketer

Cricket information
- Batting: Right-handed
- Bowling: Right-arm medium

Career statistics
Competition	First-class
Matches	7
Runs scored	157
Batting average	13.08
100s/50s	0/1
Top score	68*
Catches/stumpings	6/0
- Source: Cricinfo, 24 April 2020

Herbert Pritchard Gordon (13 September 1898 − 17 October 1965) was an English first-class cricketer who played in seven matches for Worcestershire in the early 1920s.

Walford's career was topped and tailed by games against touring international sides: he made his debut against the West Indians at Worcester in August 1923, making a career-best 68 not out in the second innings; while almost exactly a year later he played against the South Africans at the same venue. In between he appeared in five County Championship matches.

Gordon was born in Bridgnorth, Shropshire; he died at the age of 67 in Brighton.
