= F. C. Gordon =

Canadian illustrator (1856–1924)

- Born: Frederick Charles Gordon; June 30, 1856; Cobourg, Province of Canada
- Died: March 20, 1924 (aged 67)
- Education: Académie Julian; Académie Colarossi
- Occupation: Illustrator

Frederick Charles Gordon (June 30, 1856 – March 20, 1924) was an early 20th century Canadian illustrator who was a staff artist for Century magazine and also illustrated books.

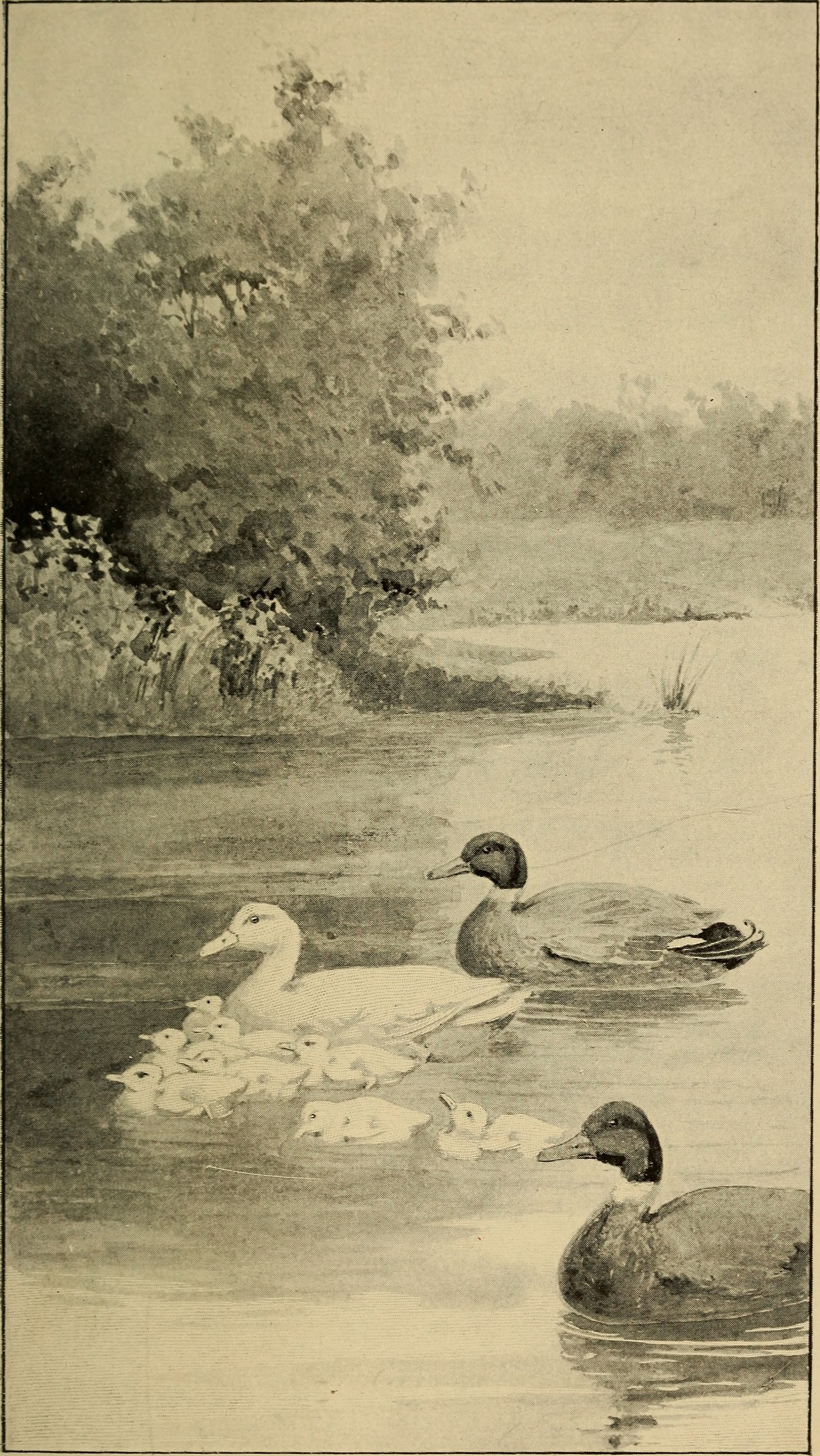
Illustration by F.C. Gordon for Clara D. Pierson's Among the Farmyard People (1899)

== Biography ==
Frederick Charles Gordon was born in Cobourg, Canada West in 1856, and received his early artistic training in Paris, France, at the Académie Julian and the Académie Colarossi. On his return to Canada, he moved to Brockville and taught art at the Brockville Business College for a time.

In 1886, Gordon moved to New York City for further art training at the Art Students League. He became a staff artist for Century magazine and created some covers for The Outlook magazine. He also illustrated books by authors such as Clara D. Pierson, Ian Maclaren, Nathaniel Hawthorne, and Ruth Ogden.

In 1908 he moved to Westfield, New Jersey, where he served as mayor for five years (1916–21). He died of a heart attack in 1924.
