= R. H. Gordon =

American politician

Richard Haden Gordon
- Born: September 6, 1844; Maury County, Tennessee, U.S.
- Died: November 26, 1917 (aged 73); New York City, U.S.
- Occupation: Politician
- Spouse: Eleanora Cunningham
- Children: 2 sons, 3 daughters
- Parent(s): Powhatan Gordon; Caroline Mary Coleman
- Relatives: William Osceola Gordon (brother)

Richard Haden Gordon (1844-1917) was an American Confederate veteran, pharmacist and politician. He served as a member of the Tennessee House of Representatives.

== Early life ==
Gordon was born on September 6, 1844, in Maury County, Tennessee. His father, Powhatan Gordon, was a politician.

== Career ==
During the American Civil War of 1861–1865, he joined in the Confederate States Army and served in the First Battle of Bull Run and the Battle of Shiloh.

After the war, Gordon worked as a pharmacist and served as the Tennessee State Board of Pharmacy. He also served as a member of the Tennessee House of Representatives. After he moved to New York City, he continued to be a pharmacist there. He also served as a major of the United Confederate Veterans and vice president of the Tennessee Society of New York.

== Personal and death ==
Gordon married Eleanora Cunningham on October 15, 1868. They had two sons, George Cunningham Gordon and Richard Haden Gordon, and three daughters, Ann McClelland Gordon, Carolyn Gordon and Eleanora Gordon.

Gordon died on November 26, 1917, in New York City.
