= Harry Gordon (entertainer) =

Scottish entertainer (1893–1957)

Alexander Ross Gordon (11 July 1893 – 21 January 1957), known as Harry Gordon, was a popular Scottish entertainer, comedian and impressionist, touring throughout Scotland and further afield. From the 1920s through the 1950s Gordon also produced a large number of recordings, including several under assumed names. He was known as the Laird of Inversnecky, a fictional Scottish town he used in his comic routines, which ended up becoming the nickname for Inverness.

== Life and career ==
Harry Gordon was born in Aberdeen as Alexander Gordon, one of five sons and a daughter. He attended King Street and Central schools, before leaving for work as an insurance clerk to help with the family finances. His first public appearance on stage may have occurred at age 12 as Princess Chrysanthemum at Gilcomston Parish Church. By the time he was fifteen years old, he decided to pursue a full-time career as an entertainer. He began to develop his stage skills at various venues in northeast Scotland.

An important turning-point in his career was the 1909 formation of a Pierrot troupe, with whom Gordon played in many open-air performances. The company formed in the village of Banchory, which influenced Gordon's most famous creation, Inversnecky. Gordon began to appear at many theatres in northeast Scotland and did seaside shows in the summer. He was physically unfit for active service in World War I but participated in the war effort as an entertainer.

After the war Gordon often performed in Aberdeen at His Majesty's Theatre and the Beach Pavilion, originally a wooden concert hall which was replaced in 1928 by a more permanent structure. Gordon often was the master of ceremonies at the Beach Pavilion and eventually leased the theatre himself before its closure in 1941. He had a homely and chatty style, establishing an intimate rapport with his audience. With his Doric accent and local knowledge he became one of Scotland's most popular entertainers. He also appeared many times before the microphone of the BBC's local radio station in Aberdeen, 2BD, which operated between 1923 and 1929.

Gordon often worked with comic foil Jack Holden and perfected his pantomime act into one of Scotland's most acclaimed. His appeal never did transfer well to England, though he worked abroad and on cruise ships. In December 1956 he was preparing to appear along with Jack Radcliffe in "Dick Whittington" at the Theatre Royal in Glasgow, when he contracted a severe attack of influenza, and died in the Royal Infirmary at Glasgow in January, 1957. His work is still remembered and has formed the basis of a one-man stage show about his career.
