= John Gordon =

John, Johnny, Jonathan, or Jon Gordon may refer to:

== Arts and entertainment ==
- John Watson Gordon (1788–1864), Scottish portrait painter and a president of the Royal Scottish Academy
- John Gordon (trombonist) (born 1939), American jazz trombonist
- Jon Gordon (musician) (born 1966), American jazz saxophonist
- John Gordon (scenic artist) (c. 1874–1911), in Australia, son of George Gordon
- John Gordon (songwriter) (born 1963), Australian singer-songwriter and music producer
- John Gordon (Danish musician), writer of the 2010 Eurovision song "Satellite"
- John Gordon (author) (1925–2017), English writer of teenage supernatural fiction
- John Gordon, pen name of Randall Garrett (1927–1987), American science fiction and fantasy author
- John R. Gordon (born 1964), English screenwriter
- Jon Henry Gordon (active 2010), makeup artist

== Military ==
- John Gordon (militia captain) (1759–1819), American Appalachian pioneer and Indian fighter
- John Gordon (Royal Navy officer) (1792–1869), court-martialed after HMS America incident
- John William Gordon (1814–1870), British Army officer and Inspector-General of Engineers
- John B. Gordon (1832–1904), Confederate general, Georgia governor, U.S. senator
  - SS John B. Gordon, a Liberty ship
- John James Hood Gordon (1832–1908), British Army general
- John Rutherford Gordon (1895–1978), Australian fighter pilot in World War I
- John A. Gordon (born 1946), deputy director of the CIA, Homeland Security advisor
- John E. Gordon, judge advocate general of the U.S. Navy, 1990–1992
- John de la Hay Gordon, British army officer, administrator and diplomat

== Nobility ==
- John Gordon, Lord Gordon (died 1517), Scottish nobleman
- John Gordon, 11th Earl of Sutherland (1525–1567), Scottish magnate
- John Gordon, 13th Earl of Sutherland, Scottish landowner and courtier
- John Gordon of Findlater (died 1562), Scottish landowner and rebel
- John Gordon of Lochinvar (died 1604), Scottish courtier and landowner
- John Gordon, 1st Viscount of Kenmure (1599–1634), Scottish nobleman and founder of the town of New Galloway
- John Gordon, 14th Earl of Sutherland (1609–1679), Scottish peer
- Sir John Gordon, 1st Baronet, of Haddo (1610–1644), Scottish Royalist supporter of Charles I
- Sir John Gordon, 2nd Baronet, of Haddo (died 1665)
- John Gordon, 3rd Earl of Aboyne (died 1732)
- John Gordon, 16th Earl of Sutherland (1661–1733), Scottish nobleman and politician
- John Gordon, 7th/10th Viscount of Kenmure (1750–1840), Viscount of Kenmure
- John Hamilton-Gordon, 1st Marquess of Aberdeen and Temair (1847–1934), Scottish Liberal politician and colonial governor

== Politics ==
- John Gordon (Aberdeen MP) (c. 1655–1730), Scottish MP 1708–1710
- John Gordon of Glenbucket, Scottish Jacobite
- John Gordon (soldier) (c. 1776–1858), MP for Weymouth and Melcombe Regis
- John Gordon (Athlone MP) (1794–1843), Irish MP 1818–1820
- John Gordon (South Londonderry MP) (1849–1922), Irish MP 1900–1916
- John Gordon (Conservative politician) (1850–1915), MP for Elginshire and Nairnshire, 1895–1906, and Brighton, 1911–1914
- Sir John Hannah Gordon (1850–1923), South Australian politician and judge
- John Gordon (Victorian politician) (1858–1937), Australian politician
- John Fawcett Gordon (1879–1965), MP in the Northern Ireland parliament for Antrim and Carrick
- Peter Gordon (politician) (John Bowie Gordon, 1921–1991), New Zealand politician
- John Gordon (union leader), president of Public Service Alliance of Canada
- Jack Gordon (official greeter) (John F. Gordon, 1921–2010), Seattle civic activist
- John William Gordon (trade unionist) (1879–?), Irish trade union official and political activist

== Religion ==
- John Gordon (bishop, born 1544) (1544–1619), Scottish bishop and Dean of Salisbury
- John Gordon (nuncio) (1912–1981), Irish diplomat of the Holy See
- John Gordon (priest, born 1726) (1726–1793), Anglican priest
- John Clement Gordon (1644–1726), Scottish bishop, Jacobite, and Catholic convert

== Sports ==
- John Gordon (rugby union) (1849–1934), Scottish international rugby union player
- John Gordon (Scottish footballer) (1886–1971), Scottish footballer
- John Gordon (referee) (1930–2000), Scottish football referee
- Johnny Gordon (1931–2001), English football player who played mostly with Portsmouth and Birmingham City
- John Gordon (sportscaster) (born 1940), American radio announcer for the Minnesota Twins Major League baseball team
- John Gordon (badminton) (born 1978), New Zealand badminton player
- John Gordon (English cricketer) (1886–1933), English cricketer
- John Gordon (Jamaican cricketer) (born 1956), Jamaican cricketer
- John Gordon (curler) (born 1958), American Olympic curler
- John Gordon (swimmer) (1945–2021), English swimmer

== Other ==
- John Gordon (merchant) (c. 1710–1778), British Loyalist merchant and trader of Scottish origin
- John Gordon (convict) (died 1845), last person executed by Rhode Island
- John Gordon (anatomist) (1786–1818), Scottish physician and anatomist
- John Thomson Gordon (1813–1865), Scottish advocate
- John Gordon (journalist) (1890–1974), Scottish newspaper editor and columnist
- John Steele Gordon (born 1944), American business and economics writer
- Jon Gordon, American business writer

== See also ==
- Jack Gordon (disambiguation)
- Jean Gordon (disambiguation), for the French version of the name
