= Kenmure Castle =

Castle in Dumfries and Galloway, Scotland, UK

Coordinates: 55°3′47.520″N 4°8′17.952″W

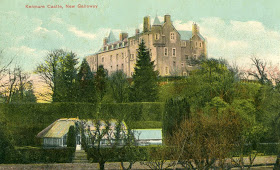
Kenmure Castle in the 19th century

Kenmure Castle is a fortified house or castle in The Glenkens, 1 mile (1.6 km) south of the town of New Galloway in Kirkcudbrightshire, Galloway, south-west Scotland. The site was occupied from the Middle Ages, and the house incorporates part of a 17th-century castle. This was remodelled in the 19th century, but the house has been derelict since the mid-20th century. It was the seat of the Gordon family of Lochinvar, later raised to the peerage as Viscounts of Kenmure. The ruin is a scheduled monument.

== History ==
The present castle stands on a partly natural mound, which may have been modified for defence in the early Middle Ages. The Lords of Galloway, rulers of a semi-independent kingdom in south-west Scotland until the 13th century, may have had a fortress here. Kenmure has been suggested as a possible birthplace in 1249 of John Balliol, later King of Scotland, whose mother Dervorguilla was daughter of Alan, the last independent Lord of Galloway. It later belonged to the Douglas and Maxwell families.

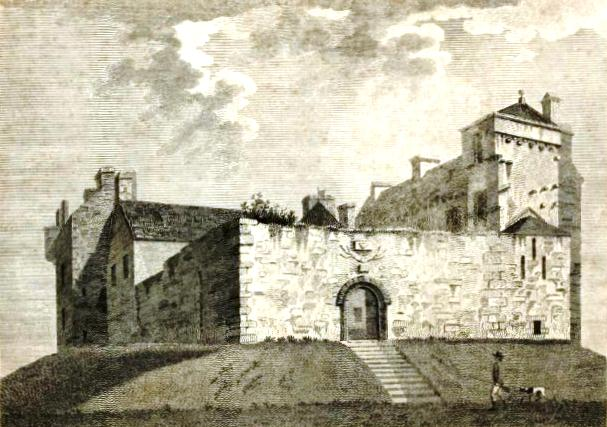
Kenmure Castle drawn by Francis Grose around 1790

Kenmure became a property of the Gordon family from 1297, when they arrived from Berwickshire. The Gordons also built a castle on an island in Lochinvar, some 6 miles (9.7 km) to the north. James IV of Scotland came to Kenmure in March 1508 following a pilgrimage to Whithorn. The king played "tables", a form of backgammon, when he stayed and gave money to the laird's servants.

The early castle at Kenmure belonging to Sir John Gordon of Lochinvar, who welcomed Mary, Queen of Scots on 13 and 14 August 1563 as she travelled from Clary to St Mary's Isle. Kenmure was destroyed or damaged by the opponents of Mary, Queen of Scots, who marched through the south-west in June 1568 after they defeated her supporters at the Battle of Langside. While Regent Moray was at Kenmure, he met an English envoy Henry Middlemore. John Gordon of Lochinvar wrote to Mary, Queen of Scots that he would not accept Regent Moray's terms and join his side. After his death an inventory was made of all the furnishings in Kenmure Castle on 3 December 1604.

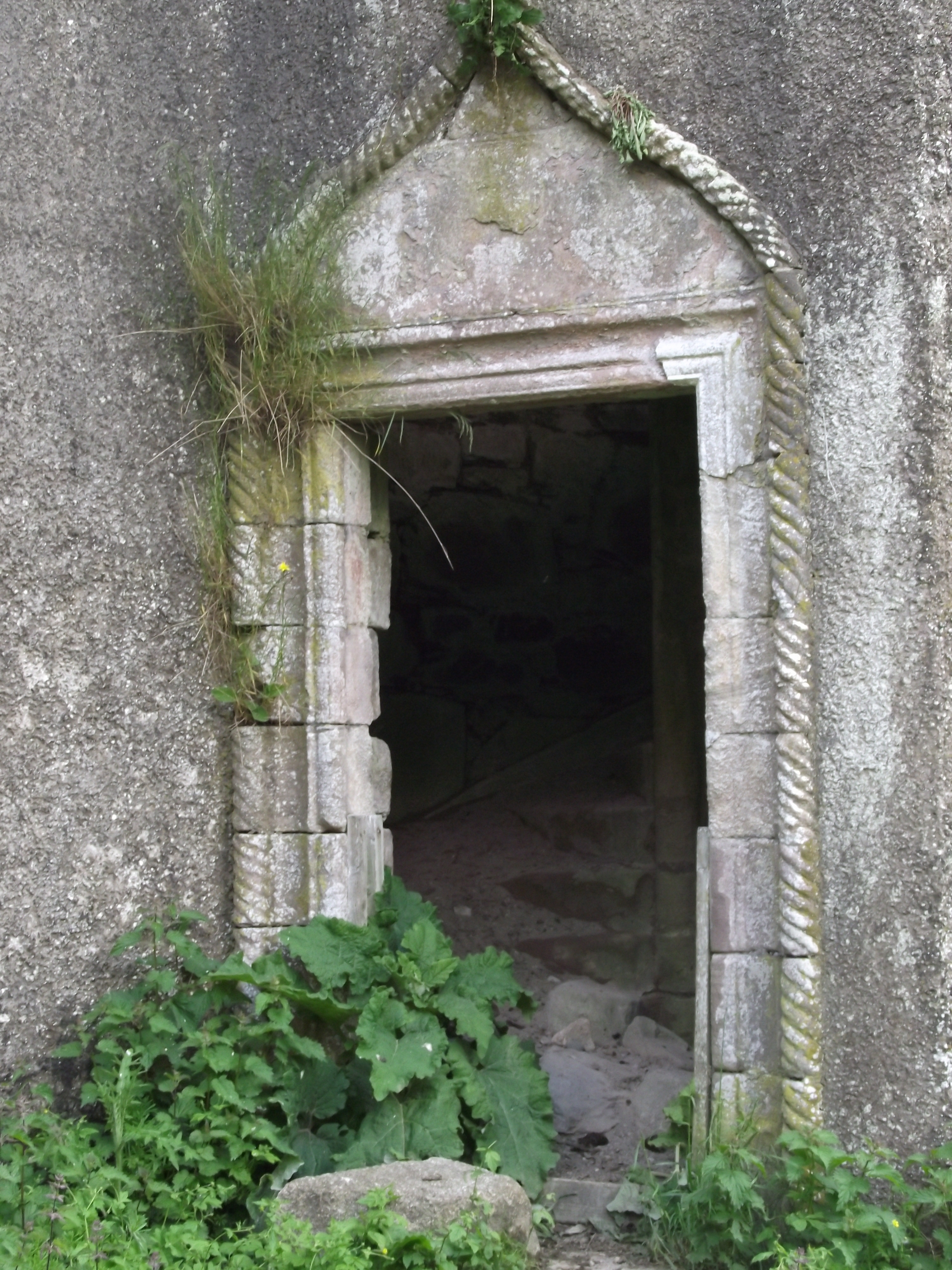
One of the castle doorways, showing distinctive 'rope' ornamentation.

Sir Robert Gordon of Lochinvar was created a baronet in 1626, and in 1633 his son Sir John Gordon was created Viscount of Kenmure by Charles I in 1633. The core of the present building is the castle which was largely erected in the 17th century, though possibly including earlier building work. The castle was laid out on the west and south sides of a courtyard, with the north and east sides formed by a high wall. The entrance gate in the north wall was flanked by towers at the two northern corners. The 6th Viscount took part in the Jacobite Rising of 1715 and was subsequently beheaded and his estates forfeit. Some accounts state that his body was returned to his family at Kenmure for burial.

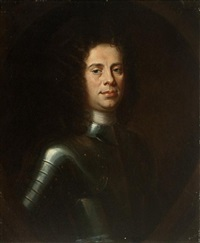
William Gordon, 6th Viscount Kenmure by Sir Godfrey Kneller, 1715

By 1790 Kenmure Castle was described as a ruin.

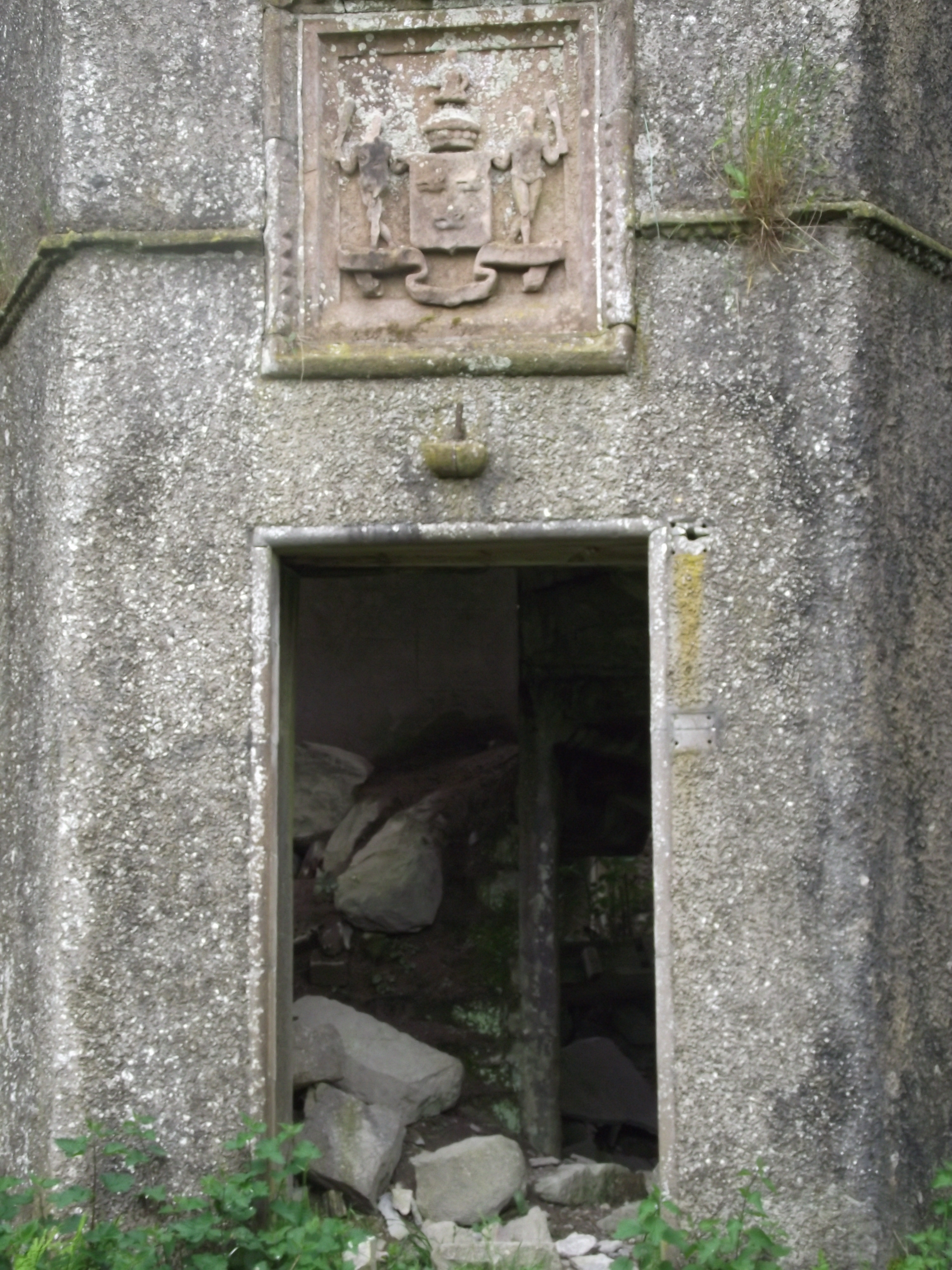
Main doorway, with heraldic panel above displaying the arms of the Gordon family.

The viscountcy was restored to Captain John Gordon in 1824 and who died in 1840, though it has been dormant since the death of his nephew, Adam the 8th/11th Viscount, in 1847. The castle was extensively remodelled and modernised during the 19th century, when the courtyard wall and the north-east tower were removed with the use of gunpowder. The south range was rebuilt in around 1840, Amongst the architects responsible for these changes were William McCandlish, in the 1840s, and Hugh Maclure in the 1860s. In 1879 the Sheffield-based architect Matthew Ellison Hadfield was employed to remodel the west range. Further extensions were made in 1908 by the architect Christian Elliot. In 1923, the estate was sold but the castle itself was let to and later bought by Brigadier-General Maurice Lilburn MacEwen CB, late 16th The Queen's Lancers. He was battalion commander of the Stewartry Home Guard. He died in 1943 at Kenmure Castle and is buried in Kells Churchyard. From about the late 1940s to 1957 it operated as an hotel run by Stanley Dobson, (brother of David Cowan Dobson), and his business partner Hugh Ormond Sparks. Around 1958 the building's interior fixtures and fittings were stripped out and the roof removed. The ruins were bought in 1962 by Graeme Gordon. The castle was not as commonly believed destroyed by fire. The remains of the castle were listed in 1971, and the site was scheduled in 1998. The castle is said to be haunted by a headless piper, "The Headless Piper of Kenmure".

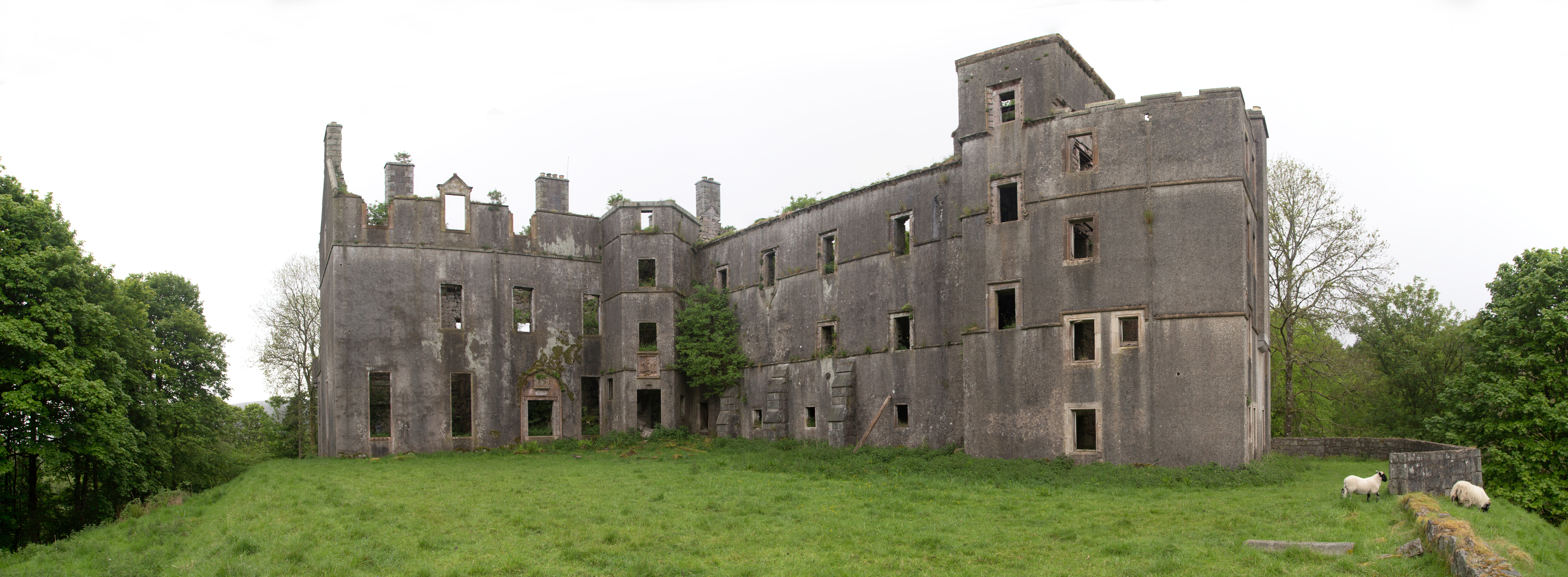
Kenmure Castle in the 21st century

A sundial bearing the date 1623 from Kenmure is now in Dumfries Museum.

== Visitors ==
- George Gillespie (1613 –1648) was a Scottish theologian and domestic chaplain to John Gordon Ist Viscount Kenmure.
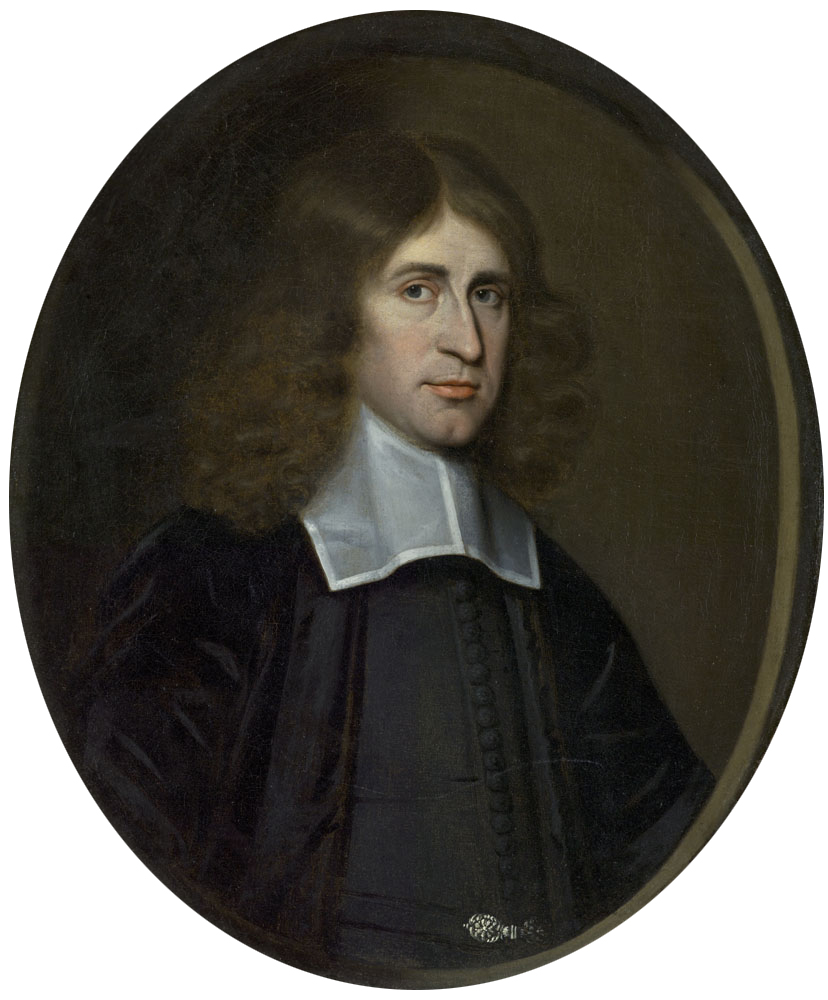
  Rev George Gillespie
- Rev Prof Samuel Rutherford (c. 1600 – 1661) Scottish Presbyterian pastor, theologian and author, attended John Gordon 1st Viscount Kenmure on his deathbed and later wrote a tract entitled "The last and heavenly Speeches and glorious Departure of John, Viscount Kenmure", printed in Edinburgh in 1649, by Evan Tyler, His Majesty's Printer. It was reprinted in 1827.
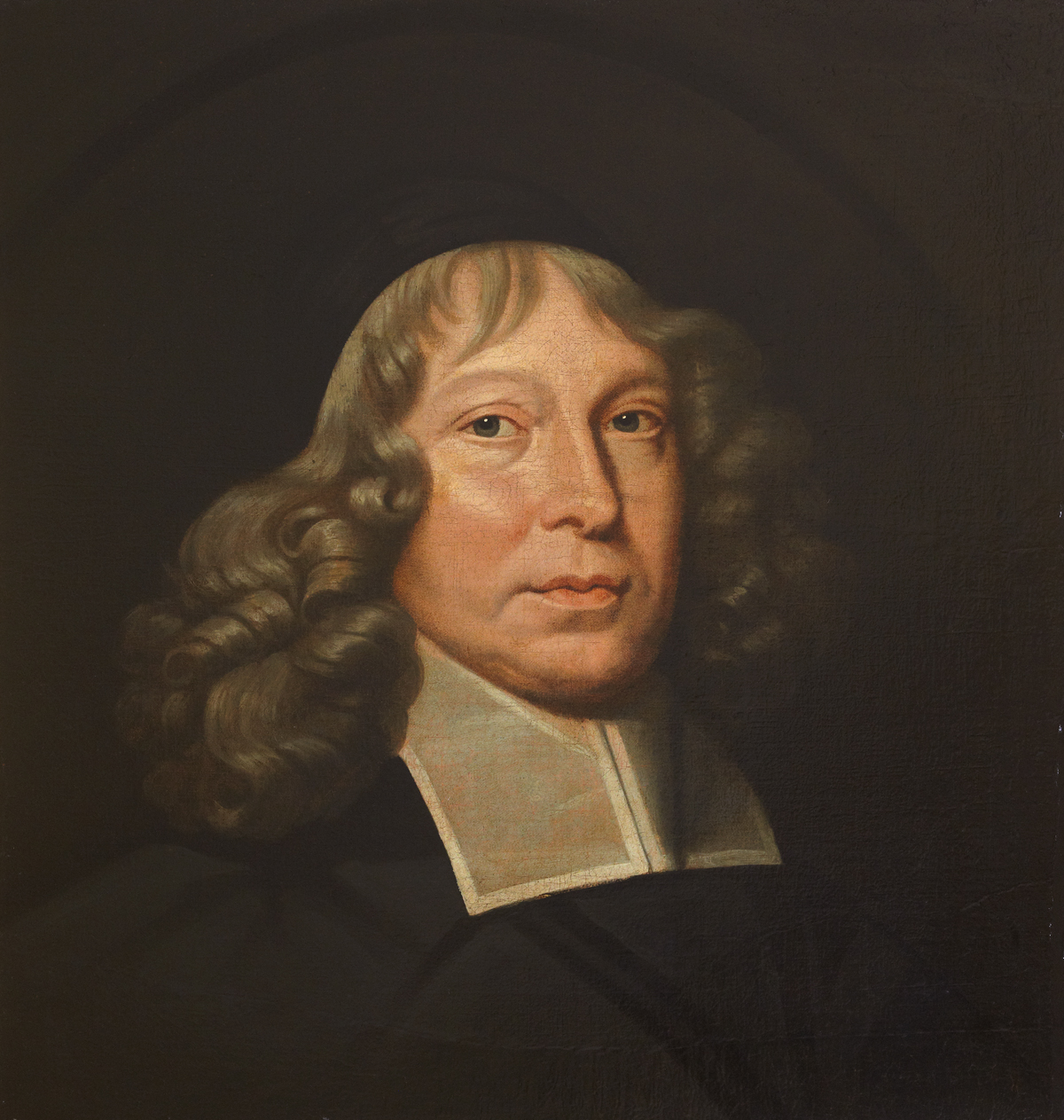
  Rev Samuel Rutherford
- Robert Burns and his close friend John Syme stayed here for three days in July 1793 as guest of the then laird John Gordon (at the time de jure 10th Viscount Kenmure), 1750-1840).
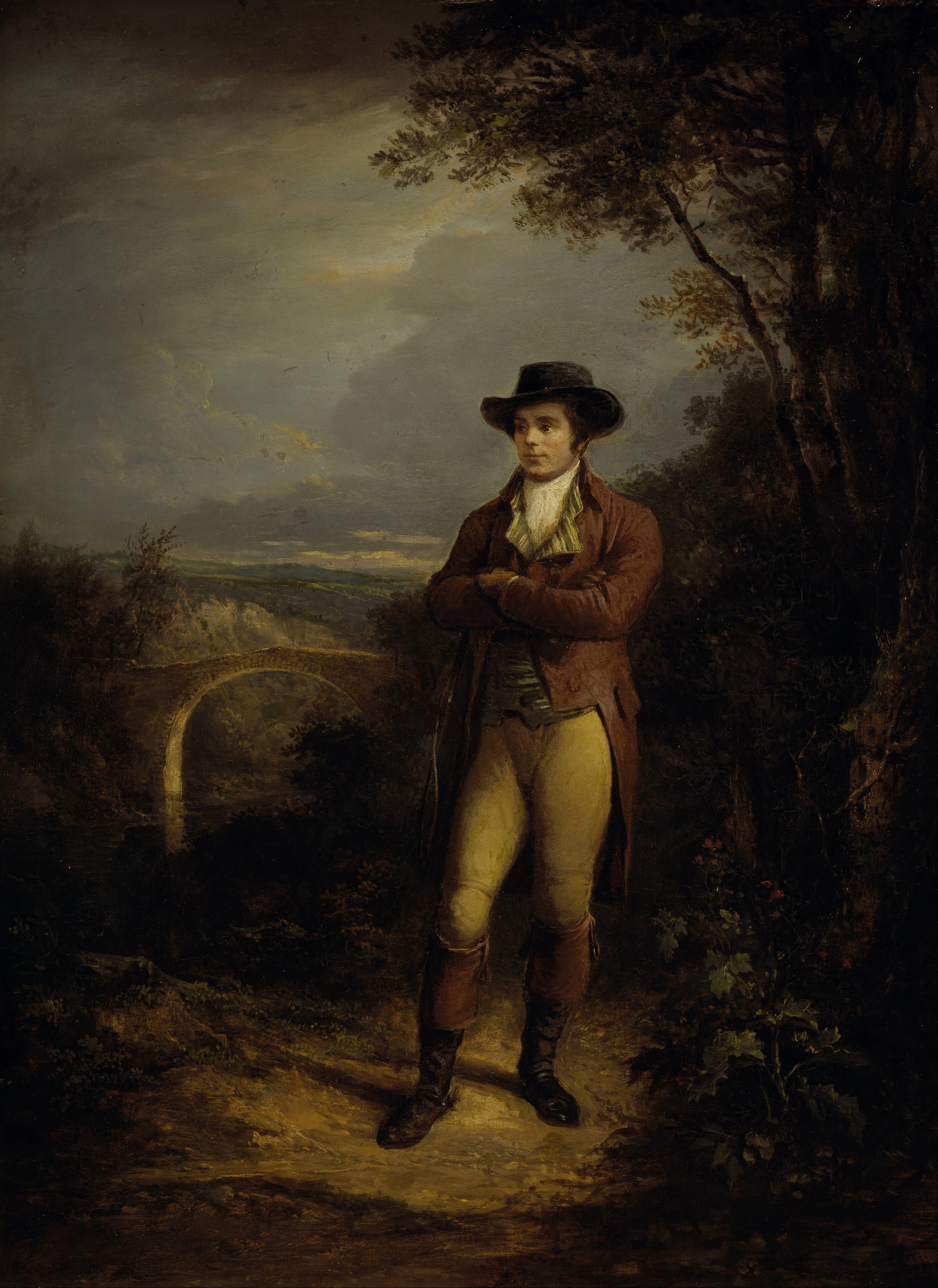
  Alexander Nasmyth - Robert Burns
- Rev Robert Nixon (1759–1837), was a Church of England priest and artist. For the last ten years of his life he served as domestic chaplain to Viscount Kenmure at Kenmure Castle where he died on 5 Nov. 1837, aged 78. By his wife Ann Russell he was father of the Rev. Francis Russell Nixon, first Bishop of Tasmania. It was in Nixon's parsonage at Foots Cray in 1798 that J M W Turner painted his first painting in oils.
- John Ruskin (1819-1900), art critic and author, stayed with his cousin Joan Agnew and her husband the artist Arthur Severn (1842-1931) at Kenmure in 1876.
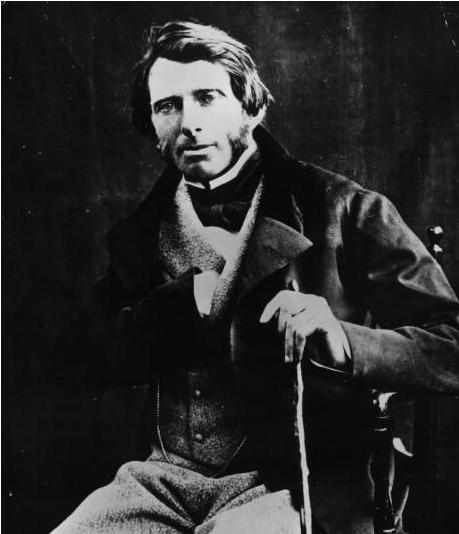
  John Ruskin 1870
- Cowan Dobson ARBB, RBA (1894–1980) Scottish portrait painter is said to have rented the castle in the 1930s and 1940s to entertain and paint his fashionable portraits and paintings.
- Charles Tate Regan. John Murray was gamekeeper to Lord Kenmure and is remembered for having caught, in 1774 in Loch Ken below the castle, the largest pike on record, the head of which rested on his shoulder, with the tail trailing on the ground. Its weight was seventy-two pounds, and it measured about seven feet in length. The skeleton of the head was for many years preserved on display in the Billiard Room at Kenmure Castle where it was studied and measured by Charles Tate Regan, ichthyologist, of the Natural History Museum. Murray died in 1777 and is buried at Kells Churchyard; on his tombstone are carved in relief a gun, fishing-rod, dog and partridge. Regan, C. Tate (Charles Tate), 1878-. The Freshwater Fishes of the British Isles. London: Methuen, 1911.
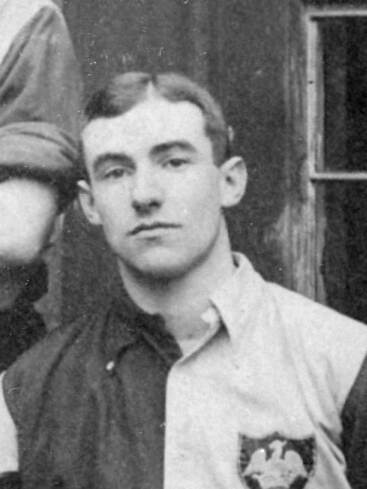
  Charles Tate Regan
