= Jane Gordon =

Jane Gordon may refer to:

- Jane Gordon, Duchess of Gordon (1749–1812), Scottish Tory political hostess
- Jane Gordon, pen-name of author Margaret Graves (1901–1962)
- Jane Gordon (jewelry designer) (born 1957), American jewelry designer
- Jane Gordon, Viscountess Kenmure (died 1675), Scottish patron of ministers

== See also ==
- Jean Gordon (disambiguation)
