= Jack Gordon =

Jack Gordon may refer to:

== Government ==
- Jack Gordon (Mississippi politician) (1944–2011), American politician in Mississippi
- Jack Gordon (official greeter) (1921–2010), American civic promoter in Seattle
- Jack Murphy Gordon (1931–1982), U.S. federal judge

== Sports ==
- Jack Gordon (footballer, born 1863) (1861–1941), Scottish footballer (Preston North End)
- Jack Gordon (footballer, born 1899) (1899–1964), Scottish footballer (Port Vale, Luton Town)
- Jack Gordon (footballer, born 1911) (1911–?), English footballer for Rochdale A.F.C
- Jack Gordon (ice hockey) (1928–2022), Canadian ice hockey coach

== Others ==
- Jack Gordon (entertainment manager) (1939–2005), American former manager and husband of singer La Toya Jackson
- Jack Gordon (Peter Worthington) (1822–1864), American renegade, soldier, and outlaw (also known as "Apache Jack" Gordon)
- Jack Gordon (actor), English actor

== See also ==
- John Gordon (disambiguation)
