= St Mary Magdalene's Church, Gilsland =

Coordinates: 54.998915°N 2.574386°W

St Mary Magdalene’s Church is a small mid-Victorian Anglican church on an isolated hillside in north-east Cumbria, England. Dedicated to Jesus' companion Mary Magdalene, it is the parish church of Gilsland, but is almost a mile from the village and may have been intended as much for the use of visitors to the nearby Gilsland Spa hotel as for the village. It is noteworthy in that the founder, G.G. Mounsey, a local landowner and first elected mayor of Carlisle, published a detailed summary of his reasons for building the church and thus threw into relief some of the reasoning behind Victorian church building and restoration.

Services at St Mary Magdalene's are conventionally Anglican in character, with an emphasis on informality.

== History ==
The church was started in 1851 but not consecrated until Oct 3rd 1854. It was built, at a cost of £800, and partly endowed by George Gill Mounsey of Rockcliffe, Carlisle who also erected the nearby Gilsland Spa Hotel in 1860. He employed the same architect, Mr. James Stewart of Carlisle, for both of these buildings. A new parish of Gilsland was created for the church, derived from the parish of Lanercost. It is 18,240 acres in area, stretching some 13 miles north of the village to the borders of Kielder Forest and south to the A69. To the east the parish abuts Greenhead parish in the diocese of Newcastle and in the west the parish of Nether Denton.

George Mounsey sets the founding of the church in a wider historical context in his book. He points out how, after the destruction of nearby Lanercost Priory by Henry VIII, no provision was made to replace the ministry provided by the monks to the surrounding area and suggests that there was a decline in moral standards as a consequence. Mounsey provides evidence that priests assigned to the parish found it difficult to support themselves from the scanty tithes available and that his foundation and endowment of St Mary Magdalene's was an attempt to rectify the situation.

== Architecture ==
=== Exterior ===
The church is built of rough stone to a simple layout in Early English style. It has a large porch on the south side of the nave and the corbels supporting the arch of the doorway have carvings of the heads of Bishop Waldegrave and Queen Victoria. Two other heads adorn the east wall, one of which appears to represent St Mary Magdalene. There is a small belfry containing one bell made by J. Blaylock in 1852, bearing the Latin inscription "Soli Deo Laus Hominibus Pax" (Peace to men, praise to God alone).

The stained glass window behind the altar and the two windows in the west wall were made by Scott of Carlisle. The window above the altar depicts St Mary Magdalene, to whom this church is dedicated. She is shown holding a white lily, her emblem. The two west windows show St Peter and St Paul. All three originally formed panels of one large west window in Rockcliffe church and were brought from there by George Mounsey when the Rockcliffe window was being altered. The Mary Magdalene panel was shorter than the aperture it was fitted into and the extra length had to be filled with plain glass.

=== Interior ===
The stone pulpit and font are contemporary with the church. In the Chancel is the two-manual organ by Harrison and Harrison of Durham, which was installed in 1901 at a cost of £172. The carved oak choir stalls together with the prayer desk near the font were made by Mr. James Wilson, a local joiner who lived in Mumps Hall in the village. He also carved the oak chancel screen, the top of which was removed in 1958 and now forms the front of the altar.

The oak reredos and panelling are in memory of George Mounsey, founder of the church. A brass plaque in his commemoration can be found on the panelling to the right of the organ. There is a second plaque, nearer the organ, in memory of the former organist and choirmaster, W. R. Wright, son of the vicar Adam Wright mentioned on the lectern.
