= Scottish Lullaby =

Traditional Scottish melody

Scottish Lullaby is a traditional melody that comes from the clans of the Scottish Highlands. Only the air Cdul gu lo (Sleep on till dawn) and not the original Scottish verses were used when a dramatization of Sir Walter Scott’s Guy Mannering was presented. For this, Sir Walter Scott composed the verses ‘Lullaby for an Infant Child’.

The history of the Highlands and the wars by which the clans were able to preserve their independence are evoked in this first song for an infant. The dream is of the trumpet and the ideal is manhood. The lines of this lullaby are familiar to English speakers as a nursery rhyme. They are a curtailed version of Sir Walter Scott’s verses.

== Lyrics ==
Blow the wind, blow;
Swift and low;
Blow the wind o'er the ocean.
Breakers rolling to the coastline;
Bringing ships to harbor;
Gulls against the morning sunlight;
Flying off to freedom!
