= Jean Gordon =

Jean Gordon may refer to:

- Jean Gordon, Countess of Bothwell, first wife of James Hepburn, 4th Earl of Bothwell
- Jean Gordon (Scottish Gypsy) (died 1746), Gypsy queen, the basis for the character Meg Merrilies in Sir Walter Scott's novel Guy Mannering
- John Gordon (bishop, born 1544) (1544–1619), Dean of Salisbury, called "Jean Gordon" while he lived in France
- Jean Gordon (politician) (1918–2008), Canadian politician
- Jean Gordon (Red Cross) (1915–1946), niece & debated involvement with General George S. Patton in World War II
- Jean Margaret Gordon (1865–1931), American suffragist

== See also ==
- John Gordon (disambiguation)
- Jane Gordon (disambiguation)
