= Sarah Egerton =

Sarah Egerton may refer to:

- Sarah Fyge Egerton (1668–1723), English poet
- Sarah Egerton (actress) (1782–1847), English actress
