= John Gordon of Lochinvar =

Scottish courtier

Sir John Gordon of Lochinvar and Kenmure (died 1604), was a Scottish courtier, landowner, and supporter of Mary, Queen of Scots.

== Career ==
He was the son of Sir James Gordon of Lochinvar and Margaret Crichton. James Gordon went to France with James V in 1536. On 20 August 1547, his sister Janet Gordon (died 1596) married William Cunningham, later Earl of Glencairn. His father was killed at the battle of Pinkie on 10 September 1547. His home was Kenmure Castle.

In 1560, after the Scottish Reformation, he took possession of Glenluce Abbey. His servant Cuthbert Kirkpatrick refused entry to the abbot, Thomas Hay. He removed himself and his servants in November 1561, and gave the key to Gilbert Kennedy, 4th Earl of Cassilis. He welcomed Mary, Queen of Scots, at Kenmure Castle on 13 and 14 August 1563 as she travelled from Clary to St Mary's Isle.

After the battle of Langside, he gave clothes to Mary, Queen of Scots. On the 14 June 1568, because he was a supporter of Mary, Regent Moray sent the Laird of Wedderburn to ask him to surrender, but he refused. On 16 June, Kenmure was demolished by Moray's soldiers. Lochinvar himself was in Dumfries with Lord Maxwell, and the Lairds of Johnston and Cowhill with 1000 men, but they didn't fight. He wrote to Mary, Queen of Scots that he would refuse to surrender to Regent Moray or accept his terms.

In October 1568 he was appointed by Mary, Queen of Scots to be one of her representatives in England at the York Conference, where her opponents led by Regent Moray presented evidence against her including the Casket letters.

He wrote to Sir Patrick Vans of Barnbarroch about the town of Kirkcudbright. The townspeople, burgesses and merchants, had complained about chapmen in Galloway, travelling salesmen and pedlars, who undercut prices in Kirkcudbright market. This was a crime called "forestalling". Lochinvar wrote in favour of the chapmen, he considered they had "been used since the beginning, and never stopped by no man to this hour, and no way it can prejudice the merchants, but rather to their help." He thought their trade from town to country was a benefit, and they were unlikely to get together capital to trade by sea cargo and thus compete with the merchants. He also argued that the merchants had their origin in "chapmancraft".

A Spanish ship or barque docked at Whithorn in February 1590 and Lochinvar was asked to capture its lieutenant and seize the boat. He was made Vice-Admiral of the Western Seas to perform this service.

In September and October 1592 he hosted the Chancellor John Maitland and his wife Jean Fleming at Kenmure and Drumlanrig.

In 1599 he was involved a feud of the Kennedy families. He was imprisoned in June 1602 and made to pay 500 merks.

He died in 1604. An inventory was made of all the furnishings in Kenmure Castle on 3 December 1604.

== Family ==
He married firstly, Juliana Home, daughter of David Home of Wedderburn and Alison Douglas. Their daughter was Margaret Gordon, who married Hugh Campbell of Terrinzeane. He married secondly, Elizabeth Maxwell, daughter of John Maxwell 4th Lord Herries. Their children included:

- Robert Gordon of Lochinvar and Kenmure, who was knighted at the coronation of Anne of Denmark on 17 May 1590. He married Elizabeth Ruthven, daughter of William Ruthven, 1st Earl of Gowrie. Their eldest son was John Gordon, 1st Viscount of Kenmure.
- Grisel Gordon, who married Alexander Stewart, 1st Earl of Galloway

After his death, Elizabeth Maxwell married Alexander Fraser of Philorth and Fraserburgh.
