= Lochinvar =

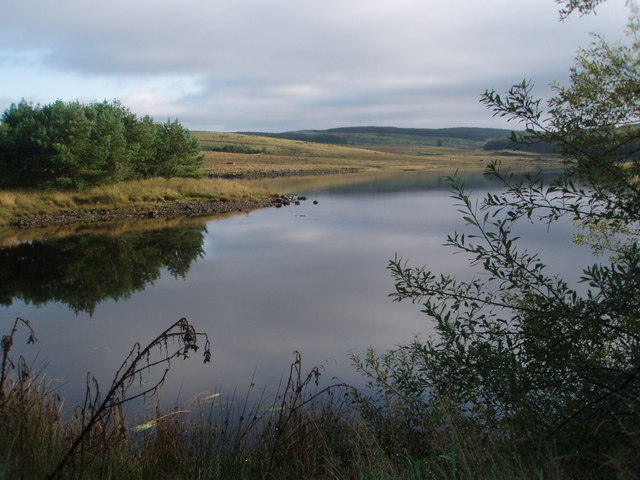
- the north-west shore of Lochinvar

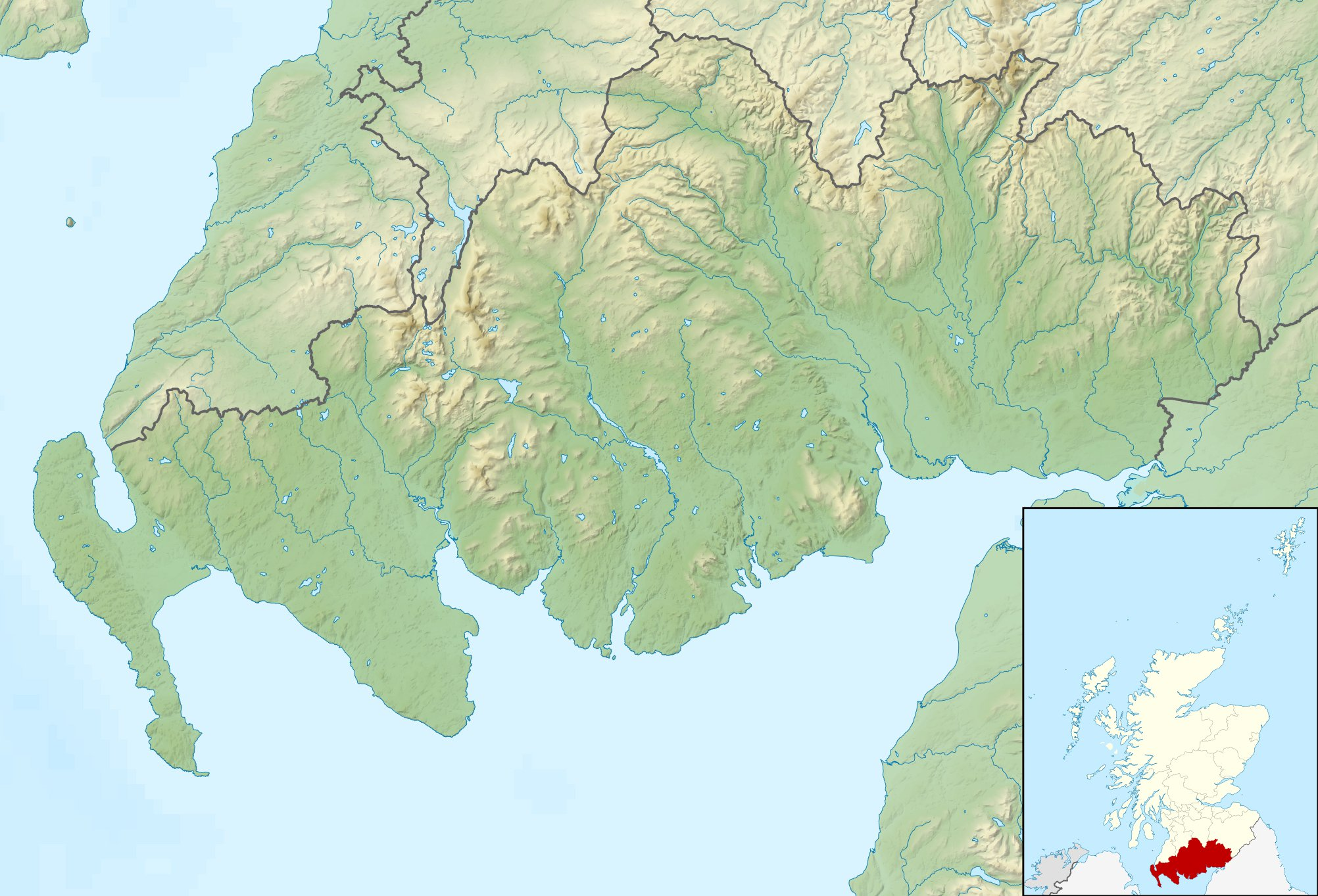
- Location within Dumfries and Galloway
- Location: Dumfries and Galloway
- Coordinates: 55°08′34″N 4°06′21″W
- Type: reservoir
- Primary outflows: Lochinvar Burn into Water of Ken
- Surface area: 39.3 ha (97 acres)
- Shore length^{1}: 3.8 km (2.4 mi)
- Surface elevation: 226 m (741 ft)
- ^{1} Shore length is not a well-defined measure.

Lochinvar (or Lan Var) is a loch in the civil parish of Dalry in the historic county of Kirkcudbrightshire, Dumfries and Galloway Scotland. It is located in the Galloway Hills, around 3.5 miles (5.6 km) north-east of St. John's Town of Dalry. The loch formerly had an island on which stood Lochinvar Castle, seat of the Gordon family. In the 20th century the loch was dammed to form a reservoir, raising the water level and submerging the island with the ruins of the castle. The loch is used for trout fishing.

The name Lochinvar is from Scots Gaelic Loch a' bharra (older Gaelic Loch an bharra, the genitive of barr = summit) meaning "Loch on the hilltop". Consequently, it is stressed on the last syllable (unlike Lochinver).

== Gordons of Lochinvar ==
The Gordon family arrived at Lochinvar from Berwickshire in 1297. They established a castle, but the date of the ruins on the former island is not known.

John Gordon of Lochinvar was a supporter of Mary, Queen of Scots. His son, Sir Robert Gordon of Lochinvar (c.1565–1628) was one of the first to embark in the scheme for the establishment of colonies in North America. He obtained a charter of what was called the barony of Galloway in Nova Scotia on 8 November 1621. In 1625 he published a tract on the subject entitled Encouragements for such as shall have intention to bee Vndertakers in the new plantation...By mee Lochinvar...Edinburgh, 1625. Lochinvar was created a baronet in 1626. On 12 July 1626 he was appointed a member of the council of war for Scotland and a Commissioner for the Middle Shires, residing at Greenlaw, Crossmichael Parish, Kirkcudbrightshire. His second son, Robert Gordon of Gelston, joined with his father in the plantation of America in the grant of the barony of Galloway in Nova Scotia in 1621. His eldest son, Sir John Gordon of Lochinvar, 2nd baronet, was a supporter of Charles I and a notable Protestant. He was created Viscount of Kenmure by Charles at his Scottish coronation in 1633.

"Young Lochinvar" is a ballad by Walter Scott, which is sung by Lady Heron in the fifth canto of Scott's epic poem Marmion (1808). Although the tale is associated with the historical Sir William Gordon of Lochinvar, 15th-century laird of Lochinvar, there is no evidence for the events described in the poem.

== See also ==
- Kenmure Castle, later home of the Gordons of Lochinvar
