= Robert Gordon of Lochinvar =

Scottish landowner

Sir Robert Gordon of Lochinvar (died 1628) was a Scottish landowner, courtier, and promoter of colonies in Nova Scotia.

He was a son of John Gordon of Lochinvar and his second wife Elizabeth Maxwell, a daughter of John Maxwell 4th Lord Herries. His homes were Lochinvar and Kenmure Castle.

Lochinvar was knighted at the coronation of Anne of Denmark on 17 May 1590.

He was involved in scandal in June 1608 when he was accused of killing his manservant. The servant was said to have been overfamiliar with his wife, Elizabeth Ruthven. It was also alleged that Gordon had invented this story of his wife's infidelity in order to divorce her and marry another woman.

He was a Gentleman of the Bedchamber to James VI and I. He was the Robert Gordon who competed at the Arthurian-themed tournament in January 1610 for Prince Henry, called Prince Henry's barriers. The combat took place in the old Banqueting Hall at Whitehall Palace. The Scottish historian Robert Johnston mentions Lochinvar's physical prowess and participation at the Prince's tournament, taking a palm of victory as a runners' up prize. The letter writer John Chamberlain said that Gordon won a prize, "more in favour of the [Scottish] nation than for any due desert".

Robert Gordon of Lochinvar joined schemes for the establishment of colonies in North America. He obtained a charter for a barony of Galloway in Nova Scotia on 8 November 1621. In 1625 he published a tract on the subject entitled Encouragements for such as shall have intention to bee Undertakers in the new plantation of Cape Briton ... By mee Lochinvar (Edinburgh, 1625). He probably encouraged subsequent landings by Scots at Baleine on Cape Breton Island, led by James Stewart, 4th Lord Ochiltree.

Lochinvar is sometimes confused with his contemporary, Robert Gordon of Gordonstoun, who was a gentleman of the king's privy chamber, and also acquired a Nova Scotia knighthood and lands in Nova Scotia.

He died in November 1628.

== Marriage and family ==
Lochinvar married Elizabeth Ruthven, a daughter of William Ruthven, 1st Earl of Gowrie and Dorothea Stewart. Her sisters Barbara and Beatrix Ruthven were favourites of Anne of Denmark. Their children included:

- John Gordon, 1st Viscount of Kenmure
- Robert Gordon of Gelston
- Elizabeth Gordon, who married James Douglas, Lord Torthorwald, a son of James Douglas of Parkhead and Elizabeth Carlyle

They divorced in 1609 and Elizabeth Ruthven married Hugh Campbell of Loudoun, Lord Loudoun (d. 1622). She died in 1617.

Baronetage of Nova Scotia
| New creation | Baronet (of Lochinvar); 1626–1628 | Succeeded by John Gordon |
