= Jane Campbell, Viscountess Kenmure =

Jane Campbell
- Died: February 1675
- Known for: supporting ministers notably Samuel Rutherford
- Title: Lady
- Spouses: Sir John Gordon of Lochinvar; Sir Henry (Harry) Montgomerie

Jane (occasionally Jean) Campbell, Viscountess Kenmure, sometimes called Lady Montgomery (? – February, 1675) was a Scottish patron of ministers. She married twice and was well regarded. She is particularly noted for her support of Samuel Rutherford and other covenanters.

== Life ==
She was the third daughter of Lady Agnes Douglas and her husband Archibald Campbell, 7th Earl of Argyll (1575/6–1638)

By 1626 she married Sir John Gordon of Lochinvar. Women in early modern Scotland did not usually change their surnames on marriage, and she was known as "Jane Gordon, Lady Lochinvar", or "Lady Lochinvar".

He was made Viscount Kenmure in 1633 and he died on 12 September 1634. He had given in to Charles I's religious changes and he was remembered for that weakness, but she was always well regarded. She married again in 1640 to Sir Henry (Harry) Montgomerie and he died in 1644. She continued to use the title of "Viscountess Kenmore" and she was now the owner of her second husband's estates including the barony of Giffen, Ayrshire. In 1648 she accepted an offer from her father-in-law, Alexander Montgomerie, 6th Earl of Eglinton. She gave him the barony in exchanges for a payment of 2,500 merks every year for life.

She is noted for her charitable support in Scotland. In particular the support and friendship she gave to Samuel Rutherford. Rutherford sent her a large number of letters which are extant.

In 1664, the book "Turtle Dove" by John Fullerton of Carleton was dedicated to her. Fullerton made his dedication by including an acrostic sonnet on "the name of the right honourable Lady JEAN CAMPBEL, Viscountess of Kenmoor".

== Biographies ==
Her biography is included in three books. In 1850 the Reverend James Anderson included her in "The Ladies of the Covenant: Memoirs of Distinguished Scottish Female Characters, Embracing the Period of the Covenant and the Persecution". Books of similar scope are William Chapman's work of 1883 and Donald Beaton's of 1909.
