= William Gordon, 6th Viscount of Kenmure =

17th/18th-century Scottish Jacobite soldier

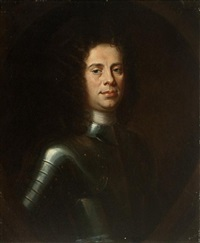
William Gordon, 6th Viscount of Kenmure by Godfrey Kneller, 1715

William Gordon, 6th Viscount of Kenmure and Lord Lochinvar (c. 1672 – 24 February 1716) was a Scottish Jacobite peer and soldier.

== Biography ==
William Gordon was the only son of Alexander Gordon, 5th Viscount of Kenmure of Kenmure Castle and succeeded his father on his death in 1698, but was not able to inherit his family's property until 1700, because of a protracted lawsuit. Not initially an active supporter of the exiled Stuarts, Lord Kenmure became the leader of the Lowlands nobles, who opposed the Act of Union in 1701.

Absenting himself from parliament, early in Queen Anne's reign, the sixth Viscount Kenmure was deeply involved in plotting for a Jacobite rising and French invasion. Late in 1705, he was chosen by Lowlands Jacobites as a delegate to St Germain, although he did not travel there. Early in 1706 he claimed that disaffection was driving the Galloway Cameronians into Jacobitism. In 1707 he was one of the Jacobite peers for whose conduct David Murray, fifth Viscount Stormont, answered to Colonel Nathaniel Hooke, envoy from St Germain. In the same year, James Francis Edward Stuart granted him a marquessate. In 1711, he married Mary (died 1776), daughter of Sir John Dalzell, 2nd Baronet (died 1698), sister of Robert Dalzell, 5th Earl of Carnwath, and niece of Captain James Dalzell, his long-time Jacobite friend. They had three sons and a daughter.

At the urging of his brother-in-law, Lord Carnwath, he joined the Jacobite rising planned by John Erskine, Earl of Mar, who appointed Kenmure, despite his total lack of military experience, commander of the Lowland Jacobite forces. Kenmure raised the Royal Banner of Scotland at Lochmaben on 12 October 1715, and was joined by about two hundred gentlemen, with the Earl of Carnwath, William Maxwell, 5th Earl of Nithsdale, and George Seton, 5th Earl of Winton. This small force received some additions before Kenmure reached Hawick, where he learnt the news of the English Jacobite rising. He joined with Thomas Forster and James Radclyffe, 3rd Earl of Derwentwater, at Rothbury. Their united forces of some hundred and fifty cavalry, after a series of marches, halted at the border, at Kelso, where they were reinforced by a brigade under William Mackintosh of Borlum.

There, on 24 October 1715, Kenmure proclaimed King James VIII. Joining with Northumbrian insurgents, he marched into England under the command of Forster. He was taken prisoner at the barricades of Preston, and brought to London. He was subsequently tried, found guilty, and beheaded on Tower Hill on 24 February 1716, and his title was forfeited. His estates were not forfeited though, as they were considered by the Crown to be in so much debt that it was not worth seizing them. Some accounts state that his body was returned to his family at Kenmure for burial.

In 1824 an act of Parliament repealed the forfeiture, and his direct descendant, John Gordon (1750–1840), became Viscount Kenmure. There are believed to be other descendants still living, although the title remains dormant.

Peerage of Scotland
New creation	— TITULAR — Marquess of Kenmure; Jacobite peerage 1707–1716	Succeeded by Robert Gordon
Preceded by Alexander Gordon	Viscount of Kenmure; 1698–1716	Succeeded by John Gordon (restored)
