= Dominie Sampson =

Fictional character created by Walter Scott

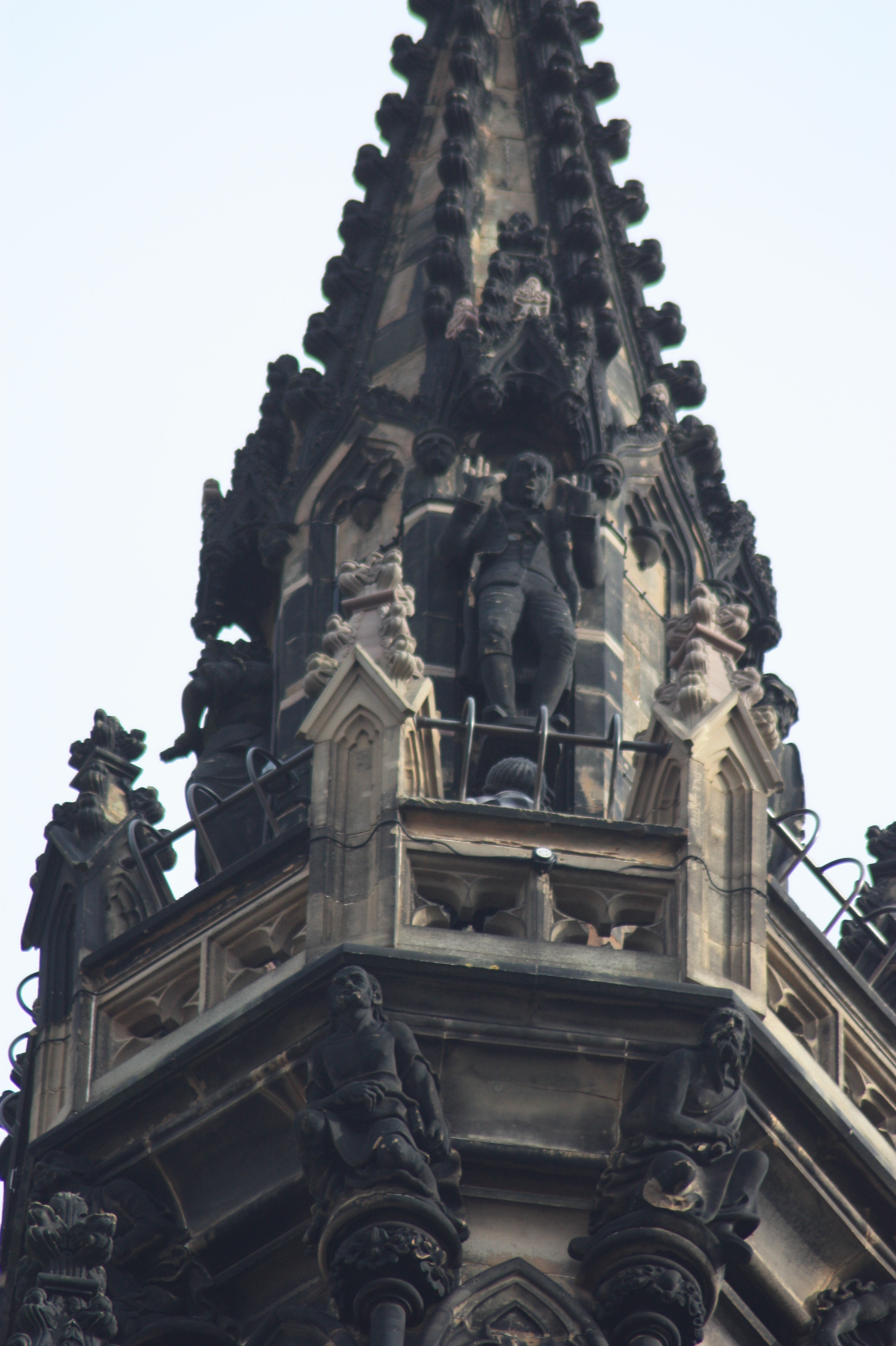
Dominie Sampson as sculpted on the Scott Monument, Edinburgh

Dominie Sampson is a schoolmaster in Scott's Guy Mannering, "a poor, modest, humble scholar, who had won his way through the classics, but fallen to the leeward in the voyage of life."

The character is referred to in Anthony Trollope's Barchester Towers, in which he is praised both for his affection for his young pupils and "the bashful spirit which sent him mute and inglorious from the pulpit when he rose there with the futile attempt to preach God's gospel."

Dominie Sampson is one of the 64 statues of figures from Scott novels found on the Scott Monument on Princes Street in Edinburgh. The figure is very hard to spot from ground level, as it is one of the four figures near the absolute apex of the monument, just above the final high viewing gallery.
