= Mumps Hall =

Coordinates: 54.9910°N 2.5750°W

Mumps Hall was an inn at the confluence of the Poltross Burn and the River Irthing, a site now at the centre of the village of Gilsland in Cumbria.

It appears in Celia Fiennes' account of her journey through northern England in 1689; she called it "a sorry place of entertainment" and it was described, but not named, by Walter Scott in his novel Guy Mannering:

“The alehouse, for it was no better, was situated at the bottom of a little dell, through which trilled a small rivulet. It was shaded by a large ash tree, against which the clay-built shed that served the purpose of a stable was erected, and upon which it seemed partly to recline. In this shed stood a saddled horse, employed in eating his corn. The cottages in this part of Cumberland partake of the rudeness which characterises those of Scotland. The outside of the house promised little for the interior, notwithstanding the vaunt of a sign, where a tankard of ale voluntarily decanted itself into a tumbler, and a hieroglyphical scrawl below attempted to express a promise of ‘good entertainment for man and horse’."

Scott later acknowledged the identity of the inn in a footnote to the 1829-33 ‘Magnum Opus’ edition of the Waverley Novels:

"Note 2. ¬ Mumps’s Ha’: It is fitting to explain to the reader the locality described in chapter xxii. There is, or rather I should say there was, a little inn called Mumps’s Ha’, that is, being interpreted, Beggar’s Hotel, near to Gilsland, which had not then attained its present fame as a Spa. It was a hedge alehouse, where the border farmers of either country often stopped to refresh themselves and their nags, in their way to and from the fairs and trysts in Cumberland, and especially those who came from or went to Scotland, through a barren and lonely district, without either road or pathway, emphatically called the Waste of Bewcastle."

The description was confirmed by George Mounsey, a local landowner and historian of the village, in his book Gillesland:

"This is an exact description of Mumps Ha’ as it existed till the year 1831. In that year a viaduct was thrown over the rivulet, and the road was raised upon it to such a height as almost to hide from view the old alehouse in the dell. Yet, with a knowledge of the alteration, it is easy on the spot to recognise the place as described by Scott. There is the little dell through which the rivulet trills - there is the steep old road down to it, and the rough stony crossing of its bed - and beyond it there is the old alehouse at the roadside. All the difference there is consists in the modern viaduct and roadway placed in front, over which the uninquiring multitude may pass without noticing the Mumps Ha’ of Guy Mannering.”

The building seems to have been a small, thatched “hedge alehouse” and was described by Granville, in 1842, as “the miserable thatched hut, its walls now plastered up and tinged with yellow ochre, which Scott has rendered so famous.” In 1877 this building was demolished and replaced with the building now on the site and known as Merrilees Cottage. Fortunately, at least one photograph of the original exists and has been published as an Edwardian postcard, although the photo must have been taken before 1877. The “steep old road” still exists and can be entered next to the phone box.

Mumps Hall features in Scott's novel Guy Mannering as the meeting place of Brown and Meg Merrilees, in the company of Dandy Dinmont. Tib Mumps, the malevolent landlady of the inn is thought to have been based upon a member of the Teasdale family who occupied Mumps Hall during the 17th and 18th centuries. Meg Merrilees and Tib Mumps are fictional characters, but the descriptive power of Scott's novels, his habit of basing characters on elements drawn from real people and the intensity with which his novels were studied during the later 19th century have blurred the boundaries between reality and fiction. The fact that Margaret Teasdale, one of the last of the Teasdales of Mumpshall, lived in 4 Hall Terrace until her death in 1777 tends to lead to her confusion with the fictional characters.

Today the name of the original Mumps Hall has been transferred to no. 4, Hall Terrace, a 17th-century building occupied during the 18th century by Margaret Teasdale. A property auction advertised in the Newcastle Courant newspaper on 17 September 1763 took place at “Mrs Teasdale’s house at Mumpshall” thus pointedly not referring to the house as Mumps Hall. The hamlet forming the western half of Gilsland is known as Mumpshall, and this can be confusing when searching for historical references to particular buildings.
