= Jean Gordon (Scottish Gypsy) =

- Born: c. 1670
- Died: 1746; Carlisle, England
- Cause of death: Murdered by drowning
- Known for: Jacobite supporter of Bonnie Prince Charlie; The inspiration for Sir Walter Scott's character Meg Merrilies

Jean Gordon (c. 1670 to 1746) was born into one of the Gypsy tribes of Kirk Yetholm. She died in Carlisle in 1746.

== Biography ==
Gordon, who was 6 feet tall, was said to be the inspiration for Sir Walter Scott's character Meg Merrilies in his novel Guy Mannering.

In 1732, aged 62, she was charged at Jedburgh Court for 'being an Egyptian' and plea bargained to leave Scotland.

Gordon was drowned in Carlisle, by an angry mob, for the support she voiced for the Jacobite cause and Bonnie Prince Charlie.
