= John Gordon (English cricketer) =

English cricketer

Personal information
- Full name: John Harvey Gordon
- Born: 15 June 1886; Reigate, Surrey, England
- Died: 23 April 1933 (aged 46); Charlottesville, Virginia, United States
- Batting: Right-handed
- Bowling: Unknown

Domestic team information
- Years: Team
- 1906–1907: Surrey
- 1906–1907: Oxford University

Career statistics
Competition	First-class
Matches	21
Runs scored	796
Batting average	20.94
100s/50s	1/4
Top score	117
Balls bowled	160
Wickets	2
Bowling average	58.50
5 wickets in innings	0
10 wickets in match	0
Best bowling	2/8
Catches/stumpings	12/–
- Source: Cricinfo, 23 June 2013

John Harvey Gordon (15 June 1886 – 23 April 1933) was an English cricketer. Gordon was a right-handed batsman whose bowling style is unknown. He played most of his first-class cricket for Oxford University, but also played county cricket for Surrey (at first-class level) and Dorset.

== Career ==
Born at Reigate, Surrey, Gordon was educated at Winchester College, where he represented the school cricket team, then went on to study at Magdalen College, Oxford. He made his debut in first-class cricket for the University Cricket Club against HDG Leveson-Gower's XI at the University Parks in 1906. Gordon made eight further first-class appearances for the university in that season, scoring 545 runs at an average of 27.35, with a high score of 117, his only first-class century, which came against Surrey. He also made two first-class appearances for Surrey in that season's County Championship against Warwickshire and Worcestershire. He continued to play for Oxford University in 1907, making a further nine first-class appearances for the team, though he was less successful, scoring 251 runs at an average of 13.94, with a high score of 51. In his 18 first-class appearances for the university, Gordon scored 678 runs at an average of 19.94. He also made a single appearance for Surrey in that season's County Championship against Nottinghamshire at Trent Bridge.

He later emigrated to the United States, playing for Merion Cricket Club in the Halifax Cup from 1911 to 1914. He died on 23 April 1933, at Charlottesville, Virginia.
