= Guy Mannering =

1815 novel by Walter Scott

Guy Mannering; or, The Astrologer
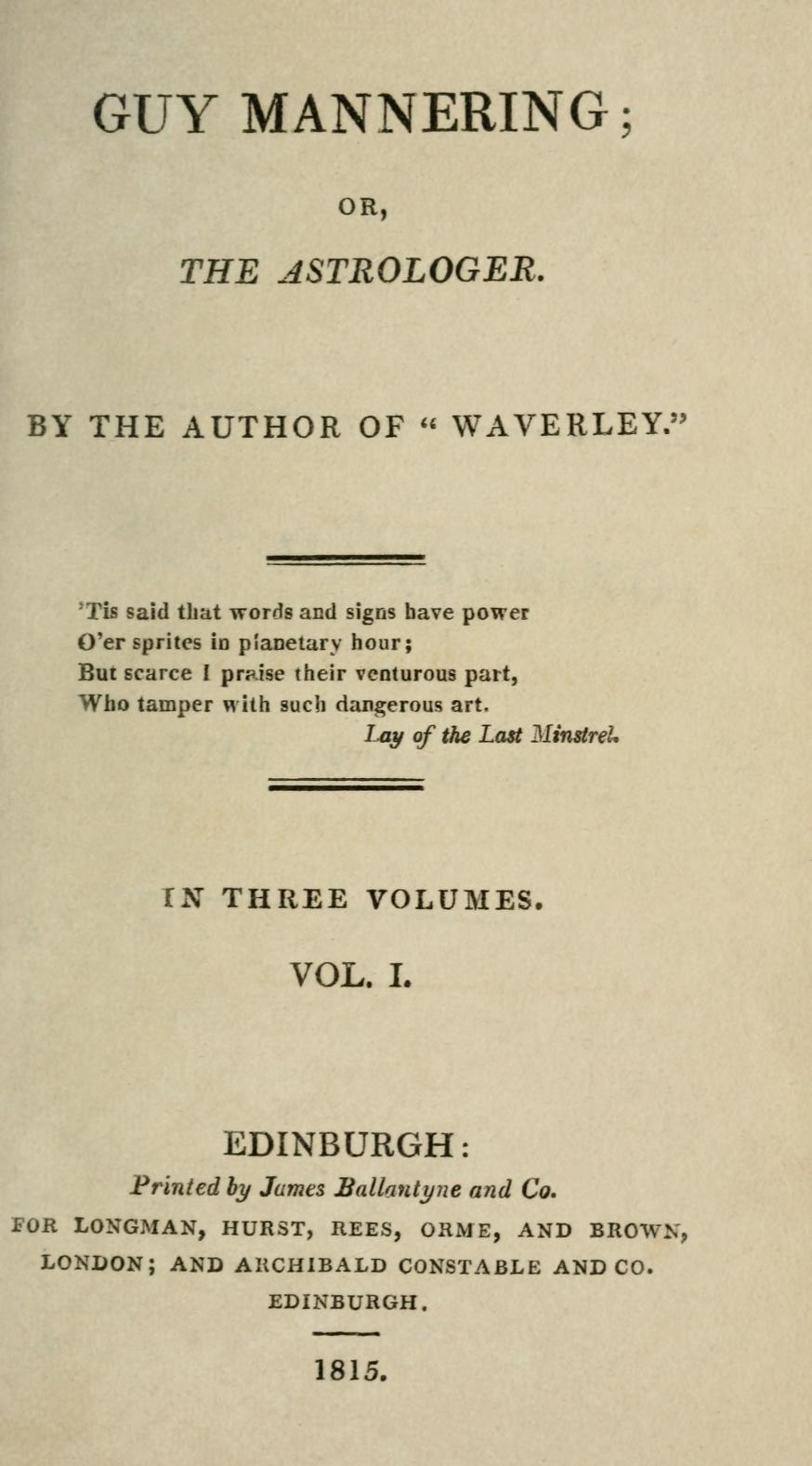
- First edition title page
- Author: Walter Scott
- Language: English, Lowland Scots
- Series: Waverley Novels
- Genre: Historical novel
- Publisher: Archibald Constable and Co. (Edinburgh); Longman, Hurst, Rees, Orme, and Brown (London)
- Publication date: 24 February 1815
- Publication place: Scotland
- Media type: Print
- Pages: 355 (Edinburgh Edition, 1999)
- Preceded by: Waverley
- Followed by: The Antiquary

Guy Mannering; or, The Astrologer is the second of the Waverley novels by Walter Scott, published anonymously in 1815. According to an introduction that Scott wrote in 1829, he had originally intended to write a story of the supernatural, but changed his mind soon after starting. The book was a huge success, the first edition selling out on the first day of publication.

== Composition ==
Scott began the composition of Guy Mannering in the last days of 1814, immediately after completing his last long narrative poem The Lord of the Isles. Writing with remarkable speed, he finished it by mid-February 1815. In a letter dated 19 January 1815, Scott writes: "I want to shake myself free of Waverley, and accordingly have made a considerable exertion to finish an odd little tale within such time as will mystify the public... W. Erskine, and Ballantyne, are of opinion that it is much more interesting than Waverley."

== Editions ==
Guy Mannering appeared in three volumes in Edinburgh, published by Archibald Constable and Co. The print run was 2000, and the selling price one guinea (£1.05). The London publishers were Longman, Hurst, Rees, Orme, and Brown, who had to wait some days before receiving their consignment of 1500 copies by sea, anticipated by copies sent down via the faster road route by Edinburgh publishers. As with all the Waverley novels before 1827, publication was anonymous. The first edition was followed by a further 5,000 copies in March and May, the second and third editions. There is no clear evidence for authorial involvement in these, or in any of the novel's subsequent appearances except for the 18mo Novels and Tales (1823) and the "Magnum" edition. Some of the small changes to the text in 1823 are attributable to Scott, but that edition was a textual dead end. At the beginning of 1828 he provided the novel with an introduction and notes, and revised the text, for the Magnum edition in which it appeared as Volumes 3 and 4 in August and September 1829.

The standard modern edition, by P. D. Garside, was published as Volume 2 of the Edinburgh Edition of the Waverley Novels in 1999: this is based on the first edition; the Magnum material appears in Volume 25a.

== Plot background ==
Guy Mannering is set in the 1760s to 1780s, mostly in the Galloway area of southwest Scotland, but with episodes in Cumberland, Holland, and India. It tells the story of Henry "Harry" Bertram, the son of the Laird of Ellangowan, who is kidnapped at the age of five by smugglers after witnessing the murder of a customs officer. It follows the fortunes and adventures of Harry and his family in subsequent years, and the struggle over the inheritance of Ellangowan. The novel also depicts the lawlessness that existed at the time, when smugglers operated along the coast and thieves frequented the country roads.

== Plot summary ==
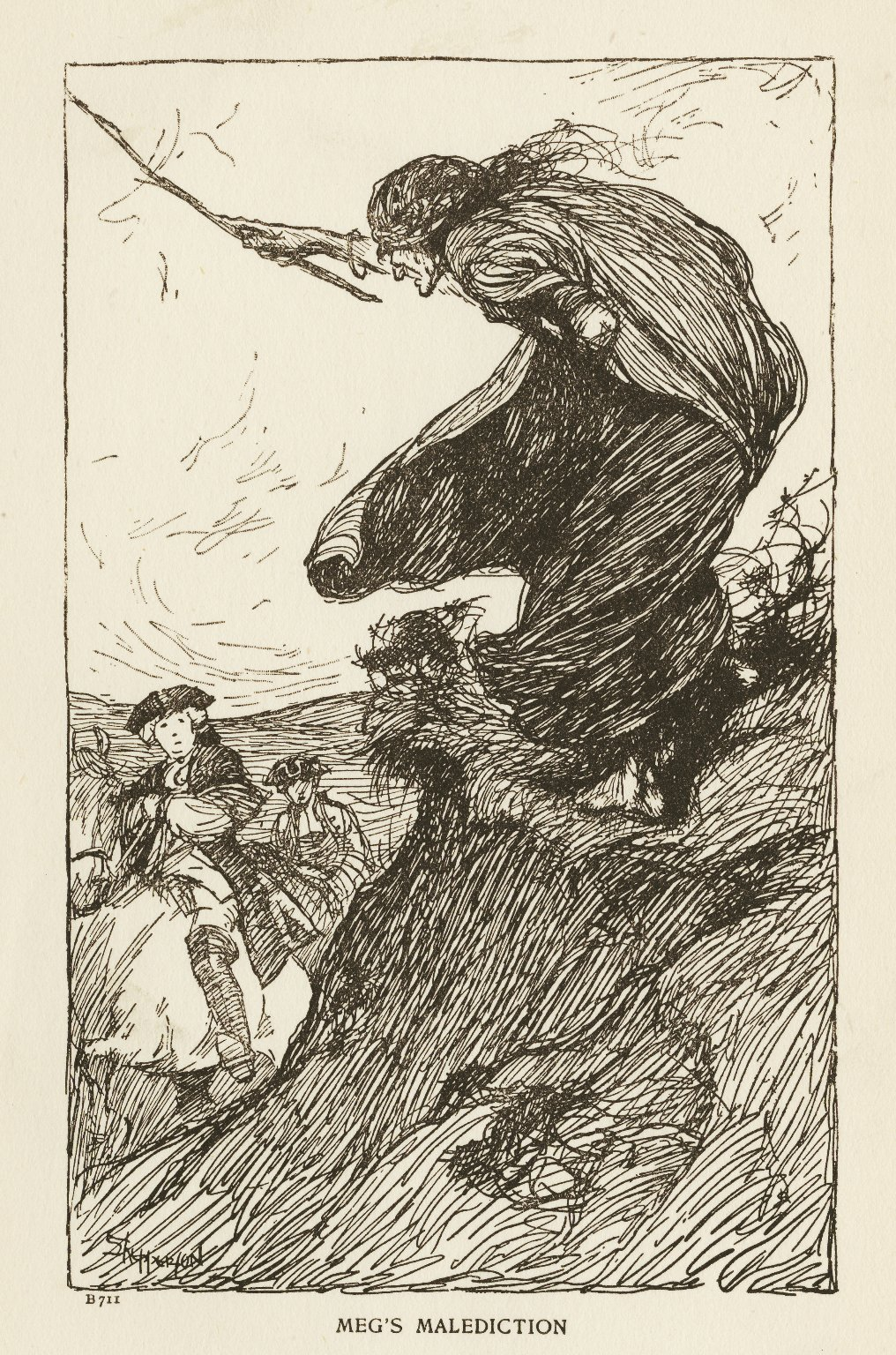
Wood-engraving by C. A. Shepperson of a scene from Scott's novel Guy Mannering, University of Edinburgh Collections

Guy Mannering, after leaving Oxford, is travelling alone in southwestern Scotland, on the coast of the Solway Firth. After losing his way at nightfall, he is directed to Ellangowan, the home of Mr Godfrey Bertram. The friendly but incompetent Bertram welcomes him, although his wife is in labour with their first child. As they await news, Mannering meets Dominie Sampson, a learned but socially inept tutor, and Meg Merrilies, (Note: A gypsy of the same name is the subject of an 1818 poem by John Keats.) a wild-looking, strident Gypsy woman, who has come to tell the child's fortune. The young student, however, offers to do this from the stars, and predicts that three periods of the boy's life will be very hazardous. Not wishing to concern the parents, he leaves his predictions to be opened when the child is five years old. Mannering also meets smuggler Dirk Hatteraick, who captains vessels active off the wild coast by Ellangowan.

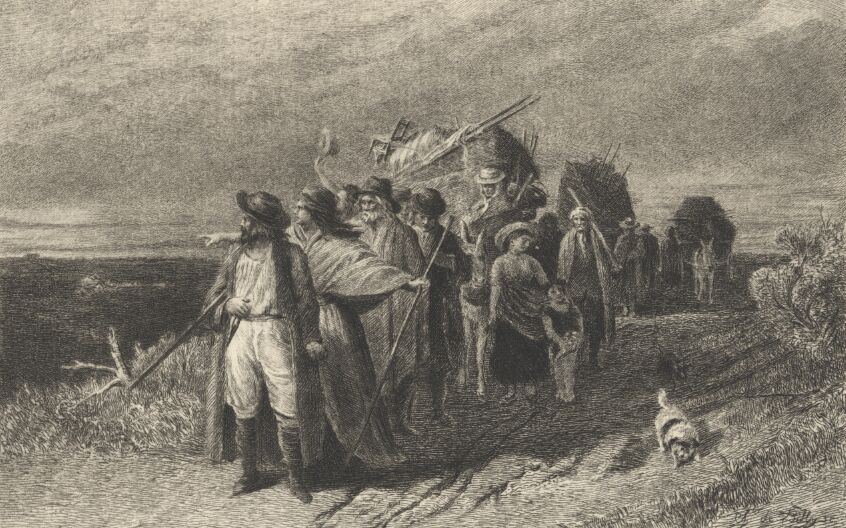
The Departure of the Gypsies, illustrated by George Clark Stanton (1892)

However, before his fifth birthday is over, little Harry Bertram disappears while in the care of an excise-man, Kennedy, who is murdered by smugglers. No trace can be found of the child, though Kennedy's body is found at the foot of a cliff. In her distress, his mother goes into labour once again, and after giving birth to a daughter, she dies.

Seventeen years elapse, and Mannering, now a Colonel, returns from India and visits Scotland once again. He arrives at Ellangowan in time to be present at the death of the now destitute Godfrey Bertram. The possessions and home of Bertram and his daughter Lucy are being sold. Mannering attempts to buy the estate, but is called back to England to attend to his own daughter who is reported to have a lover, so misses the sale. The Ellangowan estate is purchased at a reduced rate by the conniving Glossin, whose unscrupulous dealings have been one of the causes of the Bertrams' downfall. The estate is sold on the condition that if the male heir is found, the estate will return to the Bertrams.

Mannering's daughter Julia has in fact been entertaining the affections of Vanbeest Brown, a young cavalry officer from her father's regiment, though she does not admit this to her father. Brown is unsure of his parentage, having been raised in Holland, and told that though born in Scotland, he was rescued at a young age from smugglers. Colonel Mannering in fact believes that he killed Brown in a duel in India, a fact which weighs heavily on his conscience. (Out of concern that Mannering will disapprove of Brown's low status, Mannering's wife had led him to believe that Brown's affectionate visits were to her, not her daughter. Mannering's wife dies before the truth of the matter is explained.)

Mannering brings his daughter with him to Scotland, and rents a house called Woodbourne, not far from Ellangowan. He invites Lucy Bertram to be a companion for his daughter, and Dominie Sampson to be his librarian.

Brown follows Julia Mannering to Scotland, taking a roundabout route to explore some of the wilder parts of his birth country. He dines at an inn called Mumps Hall, where he meets a jolly farmer, Dandie Dinmont. Here he also meets Meg Merrilies, who seems to recognise him. The proprietress of Mump's Hall sends thugs to rob Dinmont on the road, and Brown arrives in time to help fend them off. In gratitude Dinmont invites Brown to stay at his farm with his large family (and their many terriers, all called Mustard or Pepper) for some days. While hunting with his new friend, Brown meets a gamekeeper called Gabriel, who also seems to recognise him.

Meanwhile, at Woodbourne, a group of excise-men seek protection from a gang of smugglers, who outnumber them. Under the superior tactics of Mannering, the smugglers are driven off, and several of their ringleaders killed or mortally wounded.

Proceeding on his wintry journey, Brown becomes lost; following a light, he comes to a ruined hut in a ruined hamlet of Dernclough, in which Meg Merillies is tending a dying man (one of the smugglers), singing incantations to free the soul from the body. She hides Brown, saying the dead man's accomplices will kill him. Brown watches from a cramped hiding place under some straw as the thugs empty his portmanteau and dispose of all his papers, weapons and money. In the morning, Meg shows him the road and gives him her well-ladened purse, exacting at the same time a promise that he will come to her immediately whenever she calls him to do so. He continues on his way.

Writing to a friend, Julia makes great fun of the Dominie's peculiarities, and mentions Lucy's discouragement of her suitor, young Hazlewood, because she has no fortune and he is wealthy. Julia then describes with horror the sudden appearance of Brown, who intercepts them on a path through the woods. Hazelwood, nervous from the smugglers' attack, threatens Brown, who tries to disarm him; in the struggle Hazelwood is shot in the shoulder. Brown is now a wanted man and on the run, although Hazelwood acknowledges that the shooting was accidental.

The attorney Glossin, now a justice of the peace, is indefatigable in endeavouring to trace Hazelwood's attacker, in the hope of ingratiating himself to the Hazelwood family. He hears with pleasure that the gaoler McGuffog has a man in custody. However, the man is not Brown but Dirk Hatteraick, a Dutch smuggler, known well to Glossin, who has in the past been his accomplice. Hatteraick warns Glossin that Harry Bertram has been seen in Scotland. Glossin engineers Hatteraick's escape from custody, and meets him in a hidden smuggler's cave, close to where Hatteraick caused the death of Kennedy. It is revealed that Glossin was involved with the smugglers who committed the murder, and gave them the child to dispose of. Hatteraick explains that the child was adopted and educated in Holland, and that he has recently been seen by an ex-smuggler, Gabriel, in the local hills. He also reveals that it was Harry Bertram/Brown who injured Hazelwood. Glossin is determined to kill the young heir.

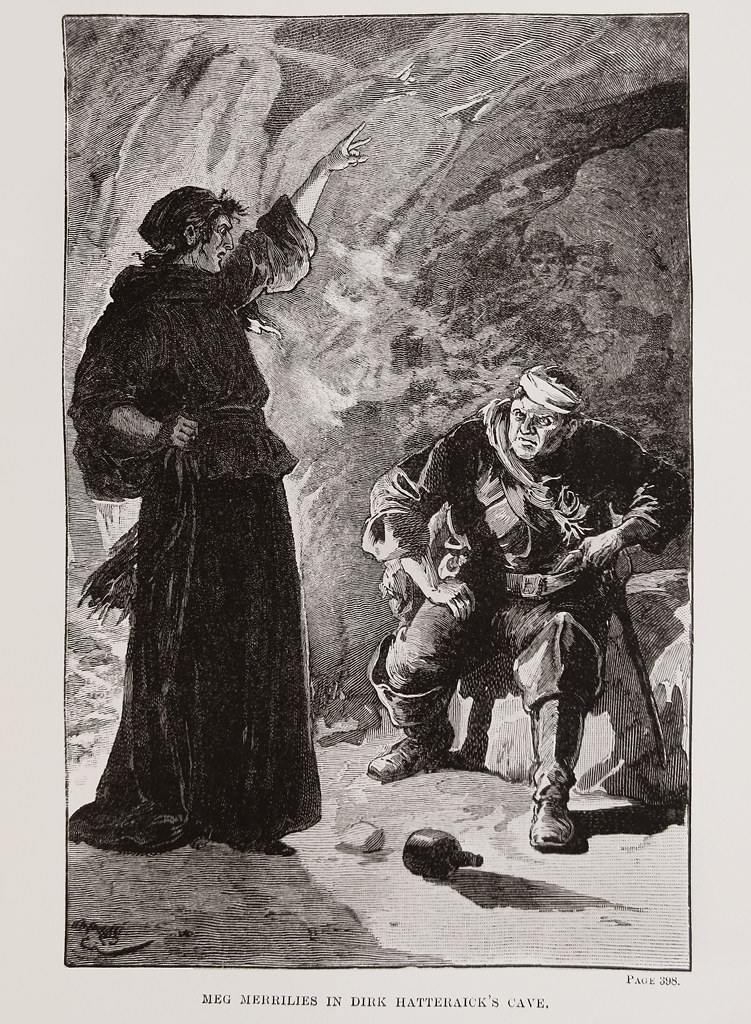
Meg Merrilies in Dirk Hatteraick's cave, illustrated by Gordon Browne (1897)

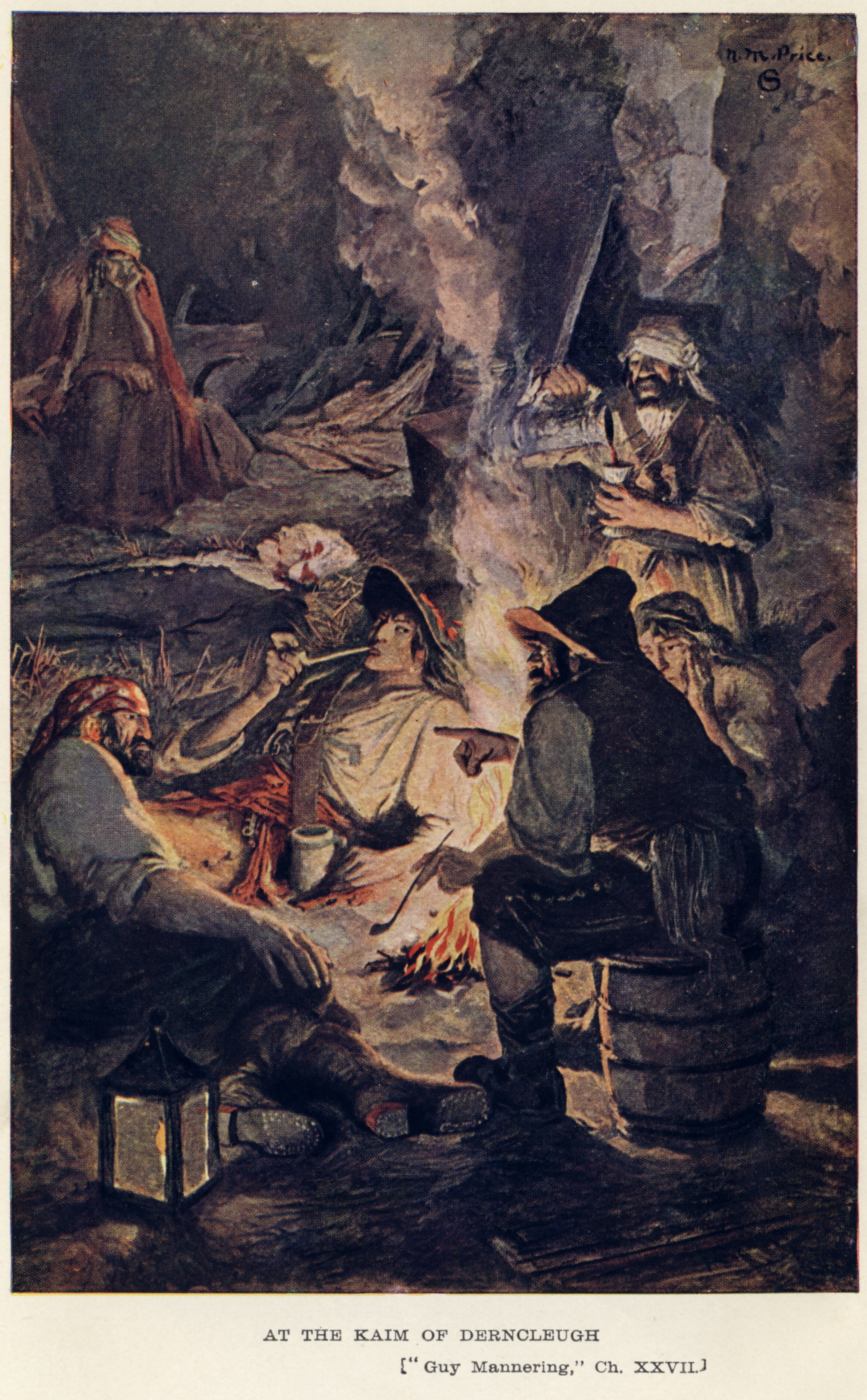
At the Kaim of Derncleugh: Guy Mannering Chapter XXVII by N M Price. (c. 1895)

An elderly aunt of Lucy Bertram's dies in Edinburgh, generating hope that her fortune may have been left to Lucy. Mannering, accompanied by the Dominie, travels to Edinburgh to place the matter in the advocate Mr Pleydell's hands. He strikes up a lively friendship with Pleydell, but they find that the old lady has left her estate to the heir of Ellangowan, when he is found. They learn from a serving-maid that Meg Merrilies planted the idea that Harry Bertram is alive in the old lady's head. Dandie Dinmont is also there, and his robust honesty earns Mannering's respect, despite the class divide.

Harry retreats to Cumberland, and writes to his regiment for replacement papers. He also manages to correspond with Julia, whose letter draws him back to Scotland. He is landed at Ellangowan, and he explores the ruined castle beside the modern estate, finding it strangely familiar. There he encounters Glossin, who promptly has him arrested for shooting Hazlewood, and lodges him in the dismal bridewell (small prison) adjoining the custom-house at Portanferry. Here he is visited, unexpectedly, by Dinmont, who has heard from Gabriel of his being in danger. Dinmont manages to convince McGuffog to allow him to stay the night in Harry's cell. (Harry at this stage still believes himself to be Vanbeest Brown.)

Meanwhile, the Colonel has returned from Edinburgh. Meg Merrilies intercepts the Dominie on a ramble, and sends an urgent note by him to Mannering. She also stops young Hazlewood, and tells him to cause the soldiers who have been withdrawn from Portanferry to be sent back there instantly. Glossin has "warned" Hazelwood's father of an attack on his estate, in order that Portanferry is left unguarded, so that Glossin's men can attack and kill Harry Bertram. During the night the custom-house is fired by a gang of ruffians; strangely, however, Bertram and Dinmont are assisted to escape, and led to a carriage. It later emerges that Gypsy relatives of Meg and Gabriel have infiltrated the party.

On the same evening Counsellor Pleydell arrives to visit his new friend Mannering, and Mannering admits that he has sent a carriage to Portanferry on the strength of a note from the old Gypsy woman. They wait impatiently for the arrival of the carriage, unsure whom it will carry. Just as they have given up, the carriage arrives. Mannering is shocked to see Brown, alive; Julia, too, is shocked by her lover's arrival; Lucy is terrified to see the ruffian who injured her lover, Hazelwood, on the road; Sampson thinks he has seen the ghost of Old Bertram. Once things have been explained, Pleydell announces finding that Bertram is heir of tailzie to the estate of Ellangowan. Harry Bertram, now acknowledged as the heir, is tearfully welcomed. Sampson hugs his "little Harry" with delight, and Mannering, his conscience cleared, welcomes the young man. Lucy embraces her long-lost brother, and Julia confesses her love to her father.

However, a legal right to Ellangowan has not been established, and Mannering and Pleydell must organise bail. Meanwhile, Bertram and the two young ladies are walking when Meg Merrilies meets them and demands that Harry come with her. He agrees, and Meg is pleased that Dinmont can accompany him as protector. The women then meet Hazelwood, and send him to follow on horseback. Meg leads the way to the Dernclough hut and arms them, then takes them to the smugglers' cave. Here the three men overcome Hatteraick, but Meg is mortally wounded in the struggle. Hatteraick is imprisoned, and crowds gather at Dernclough, where Meg is dying. They welcome the heir of Ellangowan with delight. Meg's dying revelations, along with testimony from Gabriel, furnish sufficient evidence to arrest Glossin also.

In prison, Glossin bribes McGuffog to obtain access to the smuggler's cell to concoct a defence. In fury, Hatteraick kills Glossin, then hangs himself.

Having recovered the property of his ancestors, Harry Bertram is able to discharge all his father's debts. With the help of Julia's dowry, he builds a new mansion, which includes a snug chamber called "Mr Sampson's apartment," and a separate bungalow for Colonel Mannering. Harry's late aunt's estate has also reverted to him, but he resigns it to his sister on her marriage to Hazelwood.

== Characters ==
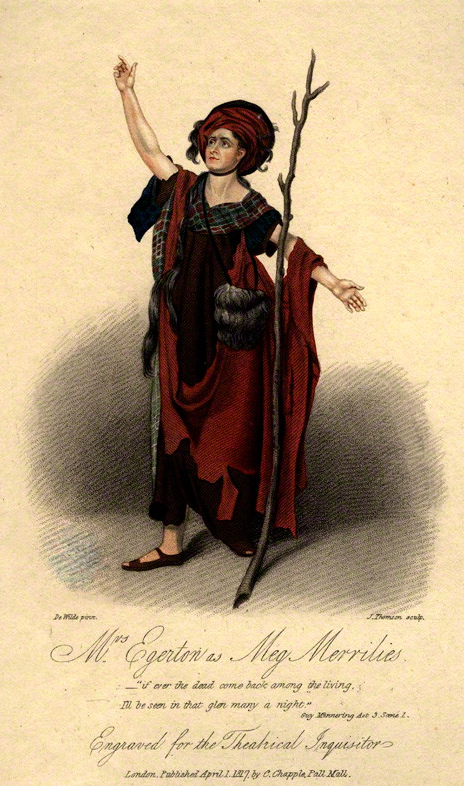
Engraving of Sarah Egerton as Meg Merrilies in Guy Mannering (1817)

Principal characters in bold

- **Guy Mannering**, afterwards a colonel in the Indian army
- **Sophia Mannering**, his wife
- **Julia Mannering**, their daughter
- Archer, a cadet
- **Godfrey Bertram**, of Ellangowan
- Margaret Bertram, his sister
- **Harry Bertram**, his son, alias Vanbeest Brown
- **Lucy Bertram**, his daughter
- Mr Charles Hazelwood, her lover
- Sir Robert Hazelwood, Charles's father
- **Dominie Sampson**, a failed minister, and afterwards Harry's tutor
- **Meg Merrilies**, a gipsy
- Gabriel Faa (Tod Gabriel), her nephew
- **Gilbert Glossin**, an attorney
- Scrow, his clerk
- **Dirk Hattaraick**, a Dutch smuggler
- Mr Frank Kennedy, a supervisor of Excise
- Mr MacMorlan, Sheriff-Substitute of Dumfries
- Mrs MacMorlan, his wife
- Mr and Mrs Mervyn, friends of Colonel Mannering
- Dandie Dinmont, a farmer
- Mrs MacCandlish, hostess of the Golden Arms at Kippletringan
- Deacon Bearcliff, a villager
- Vanbeest Brown, a smuggler
- Tib Mumps, mistress of a public-house
- MacGuffog, a constable
- **Paulus Pleydell**, an Edinburgh advocate

== Chapter summary ==
Volume One

Ch. 1: Guy Mannering loses his way while visiting Dumfriesshire and is conducted to Ellangowan by a local boy.

Ch. 2: Guy meets the decayed laird of Ellangowan and his companion Dominie Sampson, a failed minister.

Ch. 3: The gipsy Meg Merrilees arrives for the birth of Ellangowan's heir, and Guy contemplates the stars prior to drawing up a scheme of nativity for the infant (Harry Bertram), though without himself believing in astrology.

Ch. 4: Guy is surprised that the new scheme is identical with one he had prepared for his wife before their marriage. He comes across Meg spinning and singing a spell, interrupted by the smuggler Dirk Hatteraick seeking her blessing for his boat.

Ch. 5: Ellangowan tells Guy of his unhappiness at being passed over as a justice of the peace; Guy gives him the sealed nativity scheme.

Ch. 6: Four years pass. With the help of his agent Glossin, Ellangowan becomes a Justice of the Peace and exercises his power severely.

Ch. 7: Relations between Ellangowan and the gipsies on his land deteriorate.

Ch. 8: The gipsies are evicted, provoking a dramatic rebuke by Meg.

Ch. 9: Francis Kennedy is killed after interrupting smugglers, and Harry Bertram whom he has taken with him disappears.

Ch. 10: An investigation by the Sheriff-Depute draws a blank.

Ch. 11: Seventeen years pass. At the local inn Guy hears differing versions of Harry's disappearance.

Ch. 12: Guy writes to his friend Arthur Mervyn telling how during his service in India he had shot the cadet Brown [later to be identified as Harry Bertram] in a duel arising from Brown's [apparent] attentions to his wife Sophia. Sophia's poor health was further damaged by this incident and she died leaving Guy a daughter Julia. Guy discusses with the Sheriff-Substitute Mac-Morlan the forthcoming sale of the Ellangowan estate, the likely purchaser being Glossin.

Ch. 13: Ellangowan dies at the sale.

Ch. 14: The sale is suspended for a fortnight, but Guy's written authority to Mac-Morlan to purchase is delayed in transmission and the estate goes to Glossin.

Ch. 15: Sampson accompanies Lucy Bertram to live with the Mac-Morlans, where Mac-Morlan requires him to stop teaching Charles Hazlewood who evidently has an interest in Lucy.

Ch. 16: Mervyn writes to Guy telling how Julia, staying with him in Westmorland, has been serenaded from a boat on the lake.

Ch. 17: In letters to her friend Matilda Marchmont, Julia indicates that her serenader was Brown, whose attentions in India had been directed to her rather than her late mother.

Ch. 18: In further letters Julia tells of repeated visits by Brown, and of her father's decision that she should move with him to a newly rented house in Scotland.

Ch. 19: Guy completes arrangements for the household at Woodbourne which will include Sampson and Lucy as Julia's companion.

Ch. 20: The household settles in at Woodbourne.

Ch. 21: In a letter to his regimental friend Delasserre, Brown explains his cautious tactics in his pursuit of Julia.

Volume Two

Ch. 1 (22): Brown encounters the farmer Dinmont and Meg at a Cumberland inn, where Dinmont tells of the developments at Ellangowan.

Ch. 2 (23): Brown reminds Meg of Harry in his appearance. On the road he helps Dinmont to repel two highwaymen and they arrive at his farm Charlieshope.

Ch. 3 (24): Brown's reception at Charlieshope.

Ch. 4 (25): At a fox-hunt one of the participants behaves in an oddly shifty way.

Ch. 5 (26): A week's rural sports ensue: Brown enquires about the strange hunter, but ascertains only that he is called Gabriel.

Ch. 6 (27): Resuming his journey Brown loses his way in a snowstorm and finds Meg singing over a dying man [Vanbeest Brown]. She conceals him as five ruffians arrive.

Ch. 7 (28): After hiding overnight Brown loses his money and papers, but receives even more money and treasure (possibly stolen) from Meg and promises to be immediately available when she calls for him.

Ch. 8 (29): In a letter to Matilda, Julia reports on her teasing treatment of Lucy and Hazelwood.

Ch. 9 (30): Julia writes of an attack on Woodbourne by smugglers, repelled by Guy and Hazlewood.

Ch. 10 (31): Julia writes that Brown has appeared suddenly and has accidentally wounded Charles Hazelwood in an ensuing struggle.

Ch. 11 (32): Hoping to improve his standing in the community, the attorney Gilbert Glossin pursues Brown with inquiries.

Ch. 12 (33): The jailor MacGuffog brings Glossin the smuggler Dirk Hattaraick whom he has apprehended. Glossin arranges for him to escape, mindful that he had collaborated with him in abducting Harry, whose return Hattaraick announces.

Ch. 13 (34): In a cave Hattaraick tells Glossin that Gabriel (Meg's nephew) had recognised Harry at the hunting. They discuss the possibility of Hatteraick removing Harry from the country again.

Ch. 14 (35): Glossin tells Guy that Lucy is likely to benefit by the will of her aunt Margaret Bertram.

Ch. 15 (36): Guy goes to Edinburgh to attend the reading of the will and finds the lawyer Paulus Pleydell indulging in High Jinks. Pleydell dismisses a trivial territorial dispute of Dinmont's.

Ch. 16 (37): Pleydell takes Guy to Greyfriars Church. Next day Guy attends Miss Bertram's funeral.

Ch. 17 (38): The lawyer Protocol produces Miss Bertram's final will leaving the estate in trust to him for the eventual benefit of Harry on his return to Scotland.

Ch. 18 (39): Pleydell provides Guy with introductions to eminent Edinburghers, of whom he sends brief accounts to Mervyn. Guy's investigations determine that Miss Bertram heard of Harry's survival from Meg.

Volume Three

Ch. 1 (40): After a short stay in Cumberland, Harry is landed at Ellangowan.

Ch. 2 (41): At Ellangowan, Harry encounters Glossin, who has him arrested.

Ch. 3 (42): Glossin arranges for Harry to be examined by Sir Robert Hazelwood.

Ch. 4 (43): Harry is examined.

Ch. 5 (44): Harry is confined in the Portanferry jail.

Ch. 6 (45): Dinmont arrives, hears Harry's story, and stays in the jail to protect him.

Ch. 7 (46): Sampson meets Meg at Derncleugh: she gives him a message for Guy.

Ch. 8 (47): Guy gives orders to his valet on receiving Meg's letter. Meg tells Charles Hazelwood to get the guard sent back from Hazelwood House to Portanferry, but Mac-Morlan actually does this.

Ch. 9 (48): As the custom house and prison are attacked by smugglers two of them help Harry and Dinmont to escape.

Ch. 10 (49): Pleydell arrives at Woodbourne, where Guy tells him he has complied with Meg's instructions to send a carriage to bring people from Portanferry.

Ch. 11 (50): Harry and Sampson arrive at Woodbourne, where matters are clarified.

Ch. 12 (51): Sampson introduces Harry and Lucy to each other as brother and sister. Guy and Julia sort out Guy's confusion about Harry's attentions in India (see Ch. 17).

Ch. 13 (52): Although Pleydell sees difficulties in establishing Harry's identity in law, Sir Robert Hazlewood is persuaded to grant him bail. Observing Ellangowan from a distance, Harry is confronted by Meg.

Ch. 14 (53): Meg leads Harry and Dinmont to the cave.

Ch. 15 (54): Hattaraick is captured, and in the process Meg is shot.

Ch. 16 (55): Meg dies and Harry is acclaimed.

Ch. 17 (56): Pleydell examines Hattaraick and Glossin, resulting in their committal to prison.

Ch. 18 (57): Hattaraick kills Glossin and hangs himself.

Ch. 19 (58): Plans are made for the marriages of Charles and Lucy, and Harry and Julia. Guy will have a bungalow close to a large and splendid new house to be built at Ellangowan.

== Places and importance of various characters ==
The title character, Guy Mannering, is a relatively minor character in the story, a friend of the family who uses his knowledge of astrology to predict Henry's future on the day of his birth.

The old gypsy woman Meg Merrilies, is evicted from the Bertram lands early in the novel. In spite of this she remains loyal to the Bertram family, and much of the plot is dependent on her actions. She was based on an 18th-century gypsy named Jean Gordon.

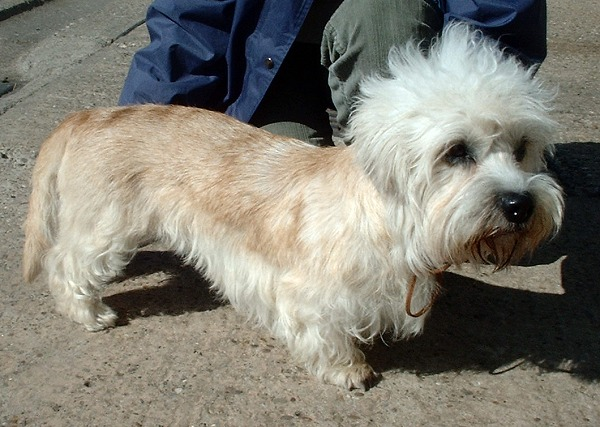
A Dandie Dinmont Terrier; the breed's name derives from one of the characters in Guy Mannering who keeps such dogs

Dandie Dinmont is a rough but friendly farmer from the Liddesdale hills, who owns a number of terriers—the Dandie Dinmont Terrier is named after him. An upland sheep-raiser of Scott's acquaintance named Willie Elliot, of Millburnholm, was probably the model for this character.

Dominie Sampson, according to Nuttall, was "a poor, modest, humble scholar, who had won his way through the classics, but fallen to the leeward in the voyage of life". "Dominie" is the Lowland Scots term for a school master.

Tib Mumps was the disreputable landlady of the inn where an important meeting takes place between Meg Merrilies and Bertram. The inn was later revealed by Scott to be based upon Mumps Hall in Gilsland.

== Reception ==
Although Guy Mannering sold briskly the critical reception was mixed. Most of the reviews were broadly favourable, but they generally had more or less substantial reservations. Positive features mentioned by several reviewers included the energetic and virtuoso writing, the vivid descriptions, the acute knowledge of human nature, and the near-sublime Meg Merrilies with the contrasting Dandie Dinmont. John Wilson Croker in The Quarterly Review was alone in thinking that Meg was given undue importance. There were objections to the inappropriate introduction of astrology, the weak plot, the insipid young ladies and the exaggerated Dominie Sampson (though he was generally appreciated), and the unintelligible Scots speeches.

== Adaptations ==
Daniel Terry, an English playwright and friend of Scott, wrote an adaptation of the work for the stage for which Henry Bishop provided the music. The musical play was premiered at the Covent Garden Theatre in London on 12 March 1816, with Sarah Egerton in the role of Meg Merrilies. It may have been the first full opera production performed in New Zealand, when it was toured to Dunedin by the Carandini troupe in September 1862.
