= Sarah Egerton (actress) =

English actress (1782–1847)

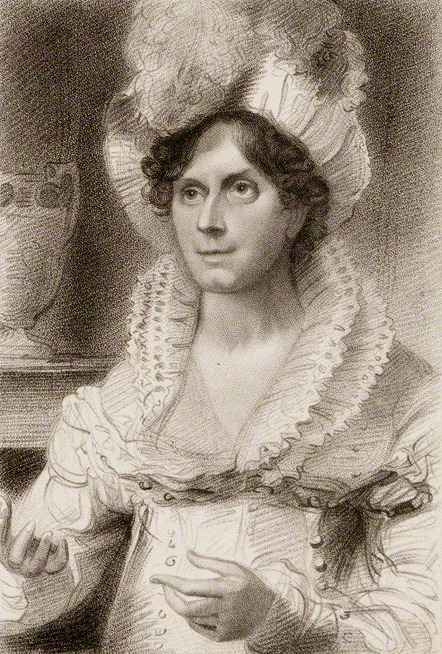
Sarah Egerton as Clarinda by Thomas Charles Wageman

Sarah Egerton (1782–1847) was an English actress. The judgement of William Macready was that "her merits were confined to melodrama."

== Early life ==
Egerton was the daughter of Peter Fisher, rector of Little Torrington, Devon. After her father died in 1803 she took to the stage, appearing at the Bath theatre on 3 December 1803 as Emma in John Till Allingham's play The Marriage Promise. Here she remained for six or seven years, playing as a rule secondary characters. Her last benefit at Bath took place on 21 March 1809, when she played Gunilda in William Dimond's Hero of the North and Emmeline in John Hawkesworth's Edgar and Emmeline. She probably married Daniel Egerton soon afterwards. He was playing leading business in Bath.

Her first recorded appearance as Mrs. Egerton was at Birmingham in 1810. On 25 February 1811, as Mrs. Egerton from Birmingham, she played Juliet at Covent Garden without much success. Marcia in Cato, Luciana in Comedy of Errors, and Emilia in Othello followed during the same season.

== Success in melodrama ==
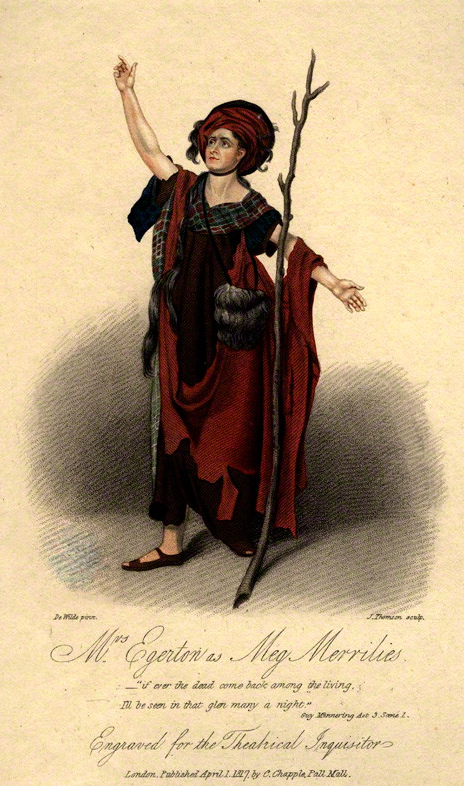
Sarah Egerton as Meg Merrilies, 1817 engraving by James Thomson, after Samuel De Wilde. From Daniel Terry's musical stage adaptation of Walter Scott's novel Guy Mannering.

Sarah Egerton had stiff opposition in Sarah Siddons and subsequently Eliza O'Neill, and it was not until she took to melodrama that her position became assured.

In The Miller and his Men by Isaac Pocock she was (21 October 1813) the original Ravina. She relapsed into obscurity, from which, thanks to adaptations from the Waverley Novels, she then returned. Guy Mannering, or the Gipsy's Prophecy, by Daniel Terry, was produced at Covent Garden on 12 March 1816. John Emery was originally cast for Meg Merrilies, but refused to take the part. The management turned almost in despair to Egerton, whose success proved to be conspicuous. Helen Macgregor in Pocock's Rob Roy Macgregor, or Auld Lang Syne, 12 March 1818, followed. Her services having been dispensed with at Covent Garden, she played (13 January 1819), at the Surrey Theatre, Madge Wildfire in Thomas Dibdin's The Heart of Midlothian, or the Lily of St. Leonard's, and subsequently Young Norval in John Home's Douglas, played as a melodrama. In 1819–1820 she appeared at Drury Lane, then under R. W. Elliston's management, as Meg Merrilies, playing during this and the following seasons in tragedy and melodrama, and even in comedy. She was the Queen to Edmund Kean's Hamlet, and appeared as Clementina Allspice in Thomas Morton's The Way to Get Married, Volumnia in Coriolanus, Jane de Monfort in the alteration of Joanna Baillie's De Monfort, brought forward for Kean 27 November 1821, Alicia in Nicholas Rowe's Jane Shore, and many other characters.

When in 1821 her husband took on Sadler's Wells, she appeared with conspicuous success as Joan of Arc in Edward Fitzball's drama of that name. Subsequently she played in melodrama at the Olympic Theatre, also under her husband's management.

== Later life ==
Soon after Daniel Egerton's death in 1835 she retired from the stage, accepting a pension from the Covent Garden Fund. She died at Chelsea on 3 August 1847, and was buried on 7 August in Chelsea churchyard.
