= Jane Gordon (jewelry designer) =

American jewelry designer (born 1957)

Jane A. Gordon
- Born: June 9, 1957 (age 68)
- Occupation: Jewelry designer
- Website: https://janegordon.com/

Jane A. Gordon (born June 9, 1957) is an American jewelry designer based in New York City.

== Early life ==
Gordon grew up in Penn Valley, on the Main Line just outside Philadelphia. She got into NYU on an acting audition, but went on to study Dramatic Literature, Comparative Religion, and Physiological Psychology. She lived in London from 1978–84, then back to NY city. Gordon got engaged and moved to Rome in the 1990s, later in the 1990s to Denia, Spain, for a job, and to South Africa for another job. The engagement and both jobs were short lived. She has traveled extensively but home remains NYC. Gordon worked for 15 years as a commercial real-estate broker in New York City and was later employed as a sales manager for an internet-based luxury goods purveyor LuxuryFinder.com. When the site shut down and she was laid off, she decided to go into the corporate gifts business, setting up a company called WishBrokers: We Sell Wish Fulfillment. Soon after, Gordon started designing jewelry.

== Jane A. Gordon Jewelry ==
Gordon's jewelry has been carried by Saks Fifth Ave, high end boutiques, and on cruise ships worldwide. While showing jewelry on ships, Gordon also gave happiness seminars illustrated with her sculptural, symbolic jewelry, and taught her super-easy pearl stringing technique. Both can be seen on her YouTube channel. Gordon went on to sell her jewelry online, and does private label, where she designs and manufactures for others to sell in their name. She also turns logos into jewelry, which started when Gordon designed a logo for the Palm Beach Club with a line of jewelry to go with it in gold, silver, and diamonds. In 2008, Gordon was featured in Lustre Magazine's "Who's Who in Designer Jewelry." and many others.

From Jane A. Gordon’s “Throwaway Elegance and a Little Bit of WOW!!!” collection, Trends and Colors magazine featured a baroque pearl with turquoise on a teal suede cord in their article “If It Ain’t Baroque- Don’t Fix It.”

Swiss based Europa Star magazine featured Gordon’s baroque pearl with turquoise on a teal suede cord from her “Throwaway Elegance and a Little Bit of WOW!!! Collection” in an article by Adrienne Weinfeld-Berg entitled Younger, Cooler, Sexier. . ……True Luxe Design Pops at New York City’s Hot Summer Shows about the 2014 summer jewelry shows.

Gordon was included in an article in The Times of India in 2015 in a story about Bollywood actress Kriti Sanon partnering with the owner of VelvetCase.com, a global online marketplace for fine jewelry. The Times cited Gordon as one of the featured designers.

In an article in Modern Jeweler magazine in 2008 Editor-in-Chief Cheryl Kremkow wrote about a revival in stud earrings, “... the most classic and essential. . . .items”, among young people. The magazine gathered designs, including one by Gordon, and presented them as a guide to new work from designers.
