= Jack Gordon (official greeter) =

American journalist

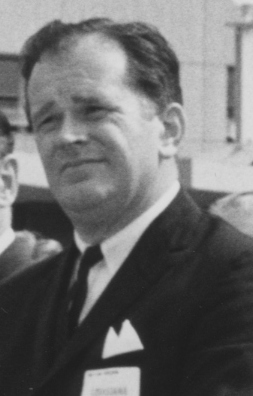
Jack Gordon on opening day of the Seattle World's Fair, 1962

John F. Gordon (June 30, 1921 – November 30, 2010) was a Seattle civic promoter, official greeter, publicist, journalist, and association executive. Gordon was born in Portland, Oregon, and died in Seattle, Washington.

Gordon headed up arrangements for visits to Washington State by Presidents Eisenhower, Kennedy, Johnson, Nixon, Ford, Carter, and Reagan as well as presidential candidates Adlai Stevenson, Hubert Humphrey, Jimmy Carter, and Walter Mondale. He welcomed governors from all 50 states as coordinator of State Honor Day programs during Seattle's Century 21 (1962) and Spokane's Expo '74.

Gordon staged visits by Mercury astronaut John Glenn in 1962 and Gemini astronaut Richard Gordon in 1966. He later brought astronauts from Gemini X, Apollo XII, XVI, and XVII missions to Seattle. Dr. George Nelson, a mission specialist on the space shuttle program was a special guest at the Restaurant Association's 1986 Pacific Int'l Hospitality Show.

Foreign dignitaries welcomed by Seattle's Official Greeter included Ethiopian Emperor Haille Selassie, Japanese Crown Prince Akihito, (now the Japanese Emperor), the President of Western Republic of Germany, People's Republic of China Premier Deng, the President of Iceland, Swedish King and Queen, Queen Elizabeth and Prince Philip of Great Britain.

As Seattle's "official greeter," Mayor Gordon S. Clinton honored him with Jack Gordon day in 1962, Mayor Floyd C. Miller and Seattle's City Council did the same in May, 1969, and Washington Governor Albert Rosellini proclaimed Jack Gordon Day throughout the state in May, 1962.

== Early life ==
Jack began his life in journalism and publicity while at O'Dea High School, where he was managing director for the O'Dea Chimes and also a junior sports writer for the Seattle Star. He later worked for both the Seattle Post-Intelligencer and The Seattle Times.

Enlisting in the Navy shortly after Pearl Harbor, Jack was sent to the Naval Air Station at Pasco, Washington, for pilot training. An accident cut his flying career short and he was transferred to the Public Relations office where he soon became Editor-in-Chief of the NAS Pasco Sky-Writer, a weekly newspaper. In May, 1945, he was transferred to the Bremerton (Washington) Receiving Station where he edited The Ship's Log weekly newspaper. Shortly after the end of the war, he was transferred to Swan Island (near Portland, Oregon) where he was created and editor the Swan Island Islander newspaper. Among events he covered as editor and photographer while on Swan Island was the return of film star Tyrone Power, who was serving as a Marine in the Pacific.

After the war, he enrolled at Seattle College and became city news editor at the Catholic Northwest Progress, where he met Roberta May Walsh, whom he married on May 1, 1948.

== Seattle University sports ==
In 1947, Jack was hired as director of public relations for Seattle College (now University). Later he moved to the Athletic Department where he served as creator and manager of The athletic news service and assistant to Athletic Director Bill Fenton and Francis Logan, S.J.

Jack created a nationwide campaign that helped win All-American honors for Johnny and Eddie O'Brien, the New Jersey recruits to the Chieftain team. In 1952, in a game played at Hec Edmundson Pavilion on the University of Washington Campus, the Chieftains, led by the 5'9" O'Brien brothers, became the only college team in America to beat the Harlem Globetrotters. Following expansion of the university's sports program, Gordon took over the newly created post of assistant director of athletics in 1953. Jack helped SU basketball coach Al Brightman, athletic backer Ralph Malone, and others recruit All-American Elgin Baylor. The 1958 Chieftains played in the NCAA Tournament, losing in the final game to Kentucky. Gordon stopped working full-time for the SU Athletic Department in 1957, but continued announcing home basketball games for the Chiefs through the 1960s.

Gordon was named to the Seattle University Sports Hall of Fame on May 27, 2011

Service as editor of the state newspapers for the Veterans of Foreign Wars and the American Legion led to a job as national press officer for the VFW in Washington, D.C. in 1949. He was commander of Seattle Post No. 1 of the American Legion during the 70s.

== Greater Seattle ==
Returning to Seattle in 1951, Jack joined the staff of the fledgling civic organization that would soon be known as Greater Seattle, Inc., as part-time public affairs director. The summer Seafair festival that included parades, events, unlimited hydro races on Lake Washington, the Aqua Theatre with the Aqua Follies, musicals, performances and visits by Bob Hope, Bing Crosby, Raymond Burr, and others all got their start under the watchful, patient eye of Jack Gordon.

== Seattle's Welcome Lane ==
The most grueling of the civic activities which Gordon found himself involved in during the early 50s were the welcomes for soldiers returning from the war in Korea. Over 500,000 men came home through the Army's Seattle Port of Embarkation a/k/a "Welcome Lane" during a three-year period. Each welcome included bands, movie stars, politicians, military leaders, and Barclay's "Can Can Girls" as well as the ever-present serpentine and parades along the piers and through downtown Seattle.

In addition to welcoming home the soldiers, Welcome Lane greeted VIPs and dignitaries from General Douglas MacArthur and the Secretary of the Army, to all 50 of the nation's governors in Seattle for a National Governors Conference with President Eisenhower. Jack received the Sixth Army Award and a Commendation from Ike for his devoted service welcoming home the troops.

(Gordon later organized a return for the first group of returning veterans from the Viet Nam War. Unfortunately he was only able to arrange one return celebration.)

Jack was named one of Time Magazine's Newsmakers of Tomorrow in 1953.

During the rest of the 1950s, in addition to working for Greater Seattle, Jack helped bring Seattle into the international light by coordinating and emceeing visits by Ethiopian Emperor Haile Selassie and Crown Prince Akihito and Crown Princess Michiko of Japan, as well as taking part in planning the 1958 Colombo Conference, attended by President Eisenhower, Secretary of State Dulles, and representatives from 18 Asian nations.

During the 1950s and 1960s Gordon produced "roast" shows for the Sportswriters Association's perennial secretary Ed Donohoe. Invited guests included former VP Alben W. Barkley and Senator Joseph McCarthy.

In 1960, he served as Vice Chairman of the "Major League Stadium for King County Committee," the predecessor of the bond plan that built the Kingdome. He was secretary of Gov. Al Rosellini's special Blue-ribbon Professional Sports Advisory Committee.

Governor Rosellini appointed him Special Advisor to the Committee on Special Events of the State Department of Commerce.

== World’s Fairs ==
The Kennedy Administration appointed him as a consultant for the Seattle World's Fair in 1961. During this time he helped coordinate pre-Fair publicity for the Fair, popularly known as Century 21, including a visit by President Kennedy in November 1961.

In 1962, at the invitation of Governor Rosellini, he created the Plaza of the States, the key ceremonial area during the Seattle World's Fair. In addition to programs for each of the states, the Plaza was the location for all of the official visits to the Fair including that of Vice-president Johnson, astronaut John Glenn, US Secretary of State Dean Rusk, California Governor Pat Brown, NY Governor Nelson Rockefeller. Special guests included U.S. Attorney General Robert F. Kennedy and U.N. Ambassador Adlai Stevenson.

Foreign dignitaries honored included the Mayor of Dublin, the Ambassadors of Sweden, France, Spain, Japan, Malaya, the Philippines, and India. Prince Philip, the Duke of Edinburgh and husband to Queen Elizabeth, spent several days touring the fair.

New Americans received their citizenship at an annual ceremony at the Plaza of the States through the late 1990s.

Building on his experience in Seattle, he created for Governor Dan Evans a patriotic setting for special observances saluting the history of each state of the union at Expo '74, the Spokane World's Fair. The Fair was the first event building up to America's 1976 Bicentennial celebration.

He was chairman of the State dinner for the National Governors Conference in 1974.

== Employment Security Commissioner and more public service ==
Gov. Al Rosellini appointed Jack as Commissioner of the Washington State Employment Security Department late in 1963. He started a "Buy Now-Jobs Now" campaign and created the Job Corps—a program later "borrowed" by Johnson Administration.

Gordon's other government and civic career background included service as National Press Officer (in Washington D.C.) of the Veterans of Foreign Wars and State Publicity Director for the American Legion and VFW; member of the executive committee of the Washington State International Trade Fair, board member and two-term president of Seattle's Civic Unity Committee, a human rights organization, followed by 10 years as a member of the Seattle City Human Rights Commission and chairman of the HRC-Seattle Police Dept. Commission. He was executive secretary to Seattle Police Chief H. J. Lawrence's Police Advisory Council. Jack was a member of the State Personnel Appeals Board during Governor John Spellman's administration.

After Jack resigned as Commissioner of Employment Security in 1965, he joined the City of Seattle as Public Affairs Director at the Seattle Center.

== Restaurant Association ==
In 1966, Gordon worked with several Seattle-area restaurant operators, including Victor Rosellini, John Franco, Walter Clark, and Dave Cohn to form the Restaurant Association of the State of Washington from a merger of the Washington State Restaurant Association, the Class H Assn., and the lobbying arm of the State Hotel-Motel Association.

During Jack's 25 years as Executive, the association grew to over 2500 member companies, representing 4200 restaurants, with a multi-million dollar annual budget and 16 employees. The association sponsored biennial restaurant/hospitality show was the 3rd largest regional convention in the U. S. and the Hospitality Industry Legislative Gala—a political fundraising event held on the eve of the annual opening of the state legislature—attracted 600 legislative and political guests in addition to 800 restaurant industry sponsors in attendance.

== Gordon honored ==
Jack's devotion to his city and his community was marked in 1969 when he received Seattle University's Distinguished Alumni Award. The following year, Gordon was privileged to present Seattle University's Award to Army Major Pat Brady.

In addition to everything else, he served as President of the Puget Sound Sportswriters and 'Casters Association (in 1957, he was awarded their "ETOIN SHRUDLU" Award), Commander of Post 1 of the American Legion, and President of the Providence Medical Foundation. Jack was active in the Municipal League, Seattle-King County Convention Bureau, Association of Washington Business, Washington State Trade Fair, Better Business Bureau, Rotary, Chamber of Commerce, President of St. Edward's Seminary Parents Club, Serra Club, City Club, Rainier Club, Columbia Tower, and Knights of Columbus.

In a 1961 column in the Seattle Times John Reddin quoted one of Jack's many friends, "Jack is fundamentally a rather shy person who naively believes that some day this sodden town will come up to his expectations. He loves a parade and is intoxicated by the music and excitement."
