= John Gordon, 1st Viscount of Kenmure =

Scottish nobleman

The Right Honourable The Viscount of Kenmure
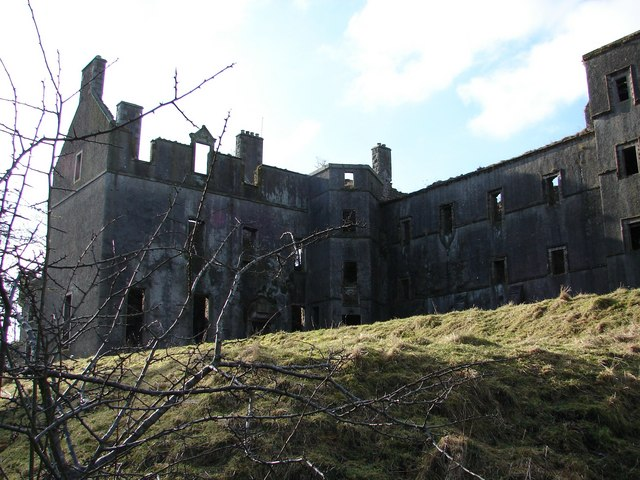
- Kenmure Castle, the Viscount of Kenmure's seat

Personal details
- Born: 1599
- Died: 1634 (aged 34–35)
- Denomination: Presbyterian

John Gordon, 1st Viscount of Kenmure (1599–1634) was a Scottish nobleman, renowned Presbyterian, and founder of the town of New Galloway.

== Biography ==
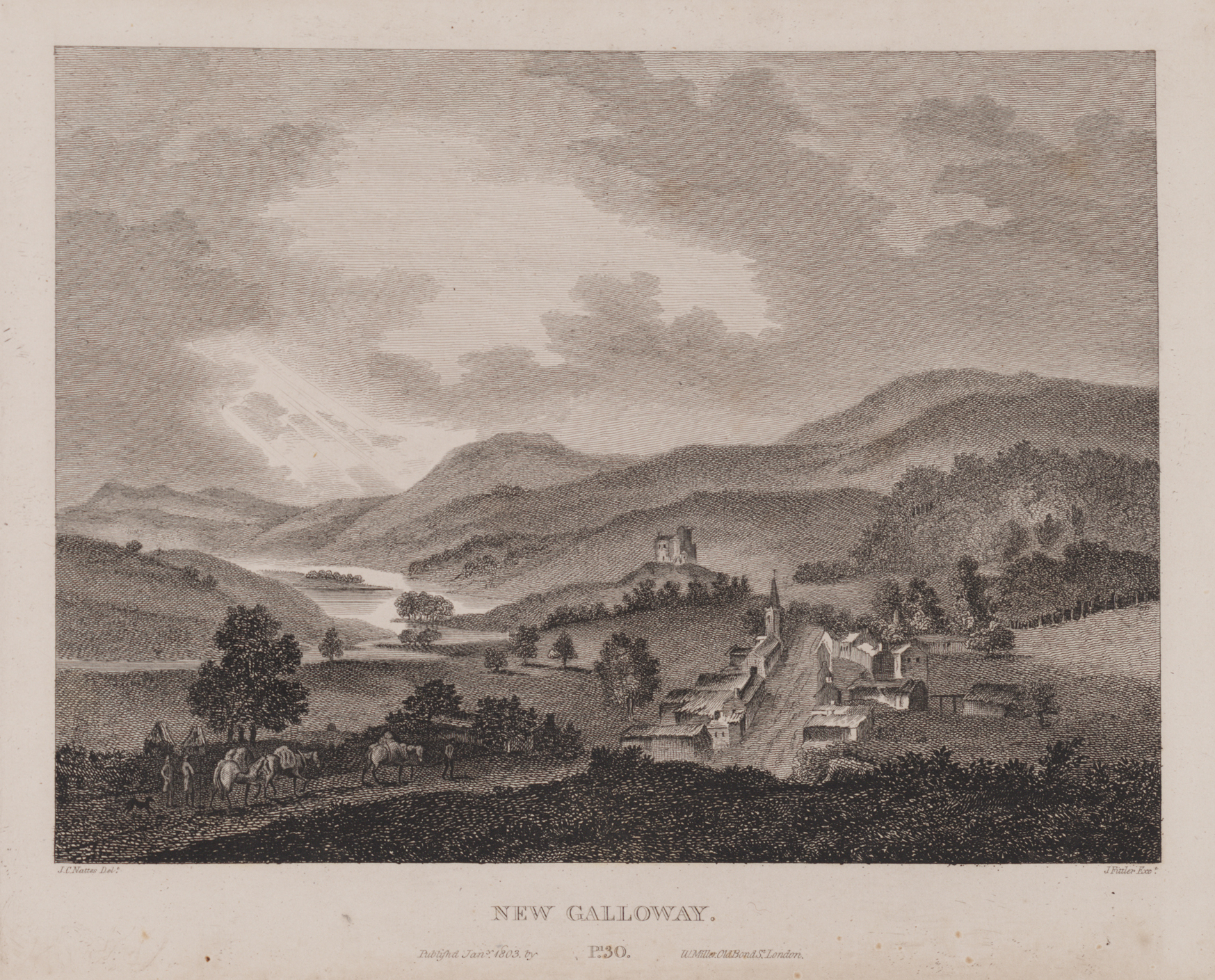
Engraving of a view of New Galloway by James Fittler in Scotia Depicta, published 1804

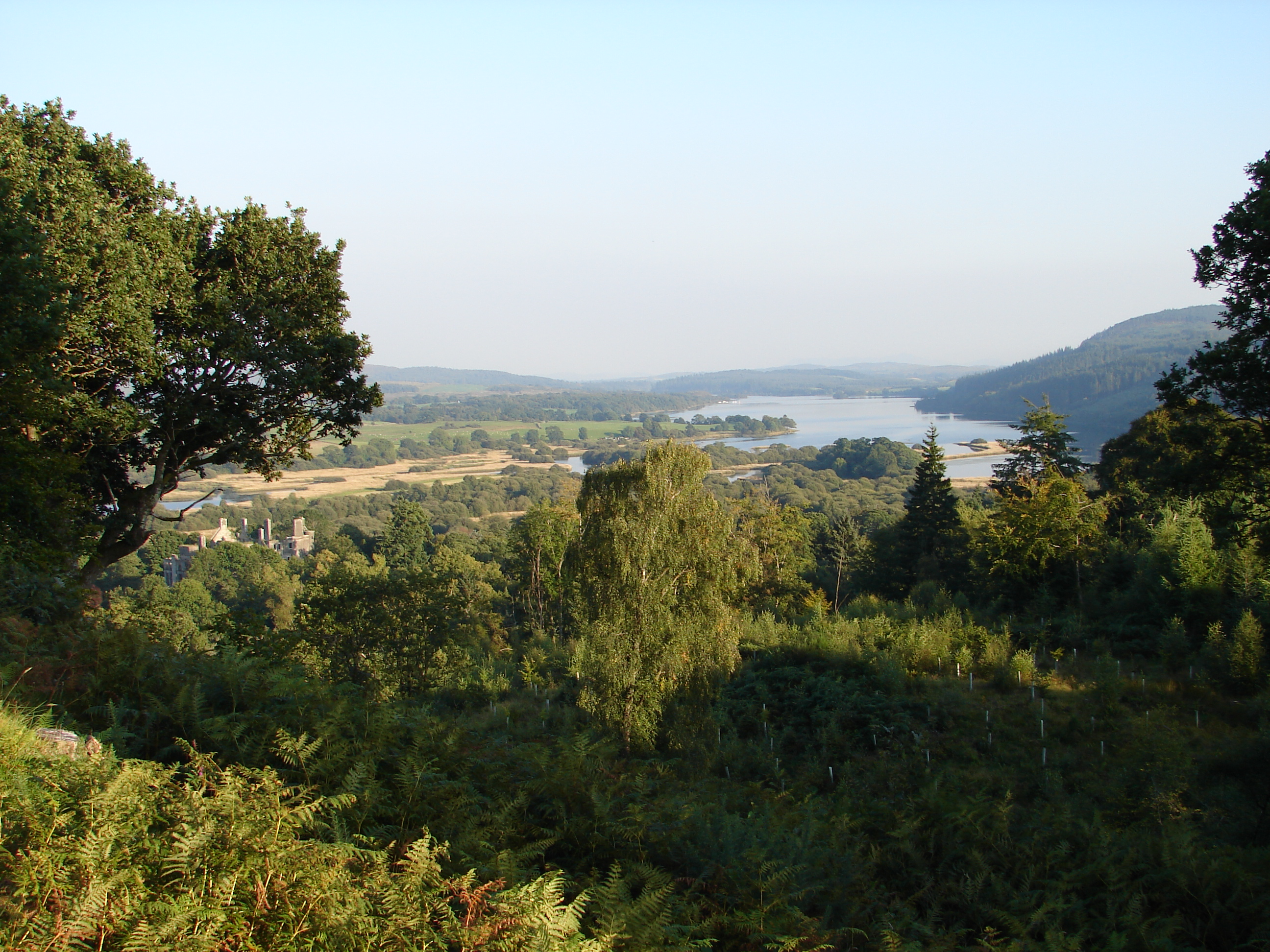
Kenmure Castle and Kenmure Holms, Kells, Kirkcudbrightshire

Sir John Gordon of Lochinvar (as he was known before his ennoblement) was the eldest son of Sir Robert Gordon of Lochinvar (d. November 1628), a Gentleman of the King's Bedchamber, by his wife, Lady Elizabeth Ruthven, daughter of William Ruthven, 1st Earl of Gowrie. After completion of his studies he travelled on the continent, and while there he resided in the house of the famous John Welsh, who was then minister at St. Jean d'Angély in France, having been banished from Scotland.

He was one of the first to embark in the scheme for the establishment of colonies in America, and in 1621 obtained a charter of what was called the barony of Galloway in Nova Scotia (now Baleine, Nova Scotia).

On his return home Gordon exerted himself with success in getting Anwoth — the parish in which the family residence was situated — disjoined from two other parishes with which it had been united; and through him, Samuel Rutherford was appointed minister of the new charge in 1627, which Kenmure later said was "the most meritorious action of my life".

At some point Gordon was knighted. A strong supporter of the Stuart monarchy, on 8 May 1633, as Sir John Gordon, knight, he was created Viscount of Kenmure and Lord Lochinvar by Charles I by Letters Patent, at his Scottish coronation in Edinburgh. The destination was to heirs male whatsoever bearing the surname and Arms of Gordon.

He attended the parliament held at Edinburgh the following June, but avoided the debate on the King's measures relative to the church, retiring instead to Kenmure Castle. He later regretted that he took no part but expressed his dilemma at not wishing to upset his monarch.

Among other favours conferred upon him by Charles I was the charter, dated 15 January 1629, of a Royal Burgh of New Galloway, a new town which was built within the limits of his estate at Kenmure Castle.

Samuel Rutherford attended Kenmure on his deathbed and later wrote a tract entitled The last and heavenly Speeches and glorious Departure of John, Viscount Kenmure, printed in Edinburgh in 1649, by Evan Tyler, His Majesty's Printer. It was reprinted in 1827.

John Gordon married Lady Jane Campbell, sister of Archibald Campbell, 1st Marquess of Argyll.

== Widow ==
When John Gordon died, Lady Jane remarried, on 21 September 1640, to Sir Harry Montgomerie of Giffen, second son of Alexander Montgomerie, 6th Earl of Eglinton, and they had no children. She lived to February 1675.

== Bibliography ==
- Douglas's Scottish Peerage (Wood), i. 27
- Howie's Scots Worthies
- Memoir by Thomas Murray, prefixed to Rutherford's Last and Heavenly Speeches of John, Viscount Kenmure. Edinburgh, 1827
- Works of Samuel Rutherford

Peerage of Scotland
New creation	Viscount of Kenmure; 1633–1634	Succeeded by John Gordon
Baronetage of Nova Scotia
Preceded by Robert Gordon	Baronet (of Kirkcudbright); 1628–1634	Succeeded by John Gordon
