= Viscount of Kenmure =

Viscount of Kenmure was a title in the Peerage of Scotland. It was created by Charles I in 1633 for the prominent Presbyterian Sir John Gordon, 2nd Baronet. He was made Lord Lochinvar at the same time, also in the Peerage of Scotland. Both titles were created with remainder to "heirs male whatsoever bearing the arms and name of Gordon"

The sixth viscount was granted a marquessate in the Jacobite Peerage by the Old Pretender in 1707, and was involved in the Jacobite rising of 1715. He was found guilty of treason and beheaded with his titles forfeited. However, the non-Jacobite titles were restored by Act of Parliament in 1824 in favour of John Gordon, who became the tenth viscount. He had earlier represented Kirkcudbright in Parliament. The titles became dormant on the death of the eleventh Viscount in 1847.

As the remainder is to heirs male whatsoever, in theory any male line collateral relation is in line to succeed. There are believed to be descendants of an ancestor of the first viscount, and also descendants of the sixth viscount living, but the titles have remained dormant. Debrett's Peerage and Baronetage claims that the Gordon of Earlston baronets are "probably next in remainder" to the titles.

It is believed the Baronetcy, of Lochinvar in the Stewartry of Kirkcudbright, was created in the Baronetage of Nova Scotia on 1 May 1626 for Robert Gordon, however, the Complete Baronetage claims this belief is "probably [erroneous]".

The viscountcy is named for the family seat, Kenmure Castle near New Galloway.

== Gordon Baronets, of Lochinvar (1626) ==
- Sir Robert Gordon, 1st Baronet (c. 1565–1628)
- Sir John Gordon, 2nd Baronet (1599–1634) (created Viscount of Kenmure in 1633)

== Viscounts of Kenmure (1633) ==
- John Gordon, 1st Viscount of Kenmure (1599–1634)
- John Gordon, 2nd Viscount of Kenmure (d. 1639)
- John Gordon, 3rd Viscount of Kenmure (d. 1643)
- Robert Gordon, 4th Viscount of Kenmure (d. 1663)
- Alexander Gordon, 5th Viscount of Kenmure (d. 1698)
- William Gordon, 6th Viscount of Kenmure (d. 1716) (attainted 1715)

Descent of titles during attainder:

- Robert Gordon, 7th Viscount of Kenmure (1714–1741)
- John Gordon, 8th Viscount of Kenmure (1713–1769)
- William Gordon, 9th Viscount of Kenmure (c. 1748–1772)
- John Gordon, 10th Viscount of Kenmure (1750–1840) (restored 1824)
- Adam Gordon, 11th Viscount of Kenmure (d. 1847)
