= John Gordon, 7th/10th Viscount of Kenmure =

Captain John Gordon, 7th or 10th Viscount of Kenmure (1750 – 21 September 1840), known as John Gordon until 1824, was a Scottish peer.

Gordon was the eldest surviving son of John Gordon, titular 8th Viscount of Kenmure, second son of William Gordon, 6th Viscount of Kenmure, who had been attainted for his role in the Jacobite Rising of 1715, with his titles forfeited. His mother was Frances Mackenzie, only daughter of William Mackenzie, 5th Earl of Seaforth. His maternal uncle was Kenneth Mackenzie, Lord Fortrose. He was a captain in the 17th Regiment of Foot. In 1781 he was returned to Parliament for the Stewartry of Kirkcudbright, a seat he held until the following year. In 1824 he was by Act of Parliament restored to his titles. This was a Scottish peerage and did not entitle him to a seat in the House of Lords and he was never elected a Scottish representative peer.

Robert Burns and his friend John Syme stayed with Gordon and his wife at Kenmure Castle in July 1793 while on their tour of Galloway.

Lord Kenmure died childless in September 1840, in his 91st year, and was succeeded in the viscountcy by his nephew, Adam.

Parliament of Great Britain
Preceded by Peter Johnston	Member of Parliament for Stewartry of Kirkcudbright; 1781–1782	Succeeded by Peter Johnston
Peerage of Scotland
Preceded by William Gordon (de jure)	Viscount of Kenmure; 1824–1841	Succeeded by Adam Gordon
