= Dickie (name) =

Dickie is a surname, a nickname (most often as a diminutive form of Richard) and a given name.

Notable people with the name include:

== People ==
=== Surname ===
- A. M. Dickie (1903–1978), Australian Presbyterian minister and activist
- Alan Dickie (born 1944), English footballer
- Bill Dickie (ice hockey) (1916–1997), Canadian ice hockey player
- Bill Dickie (politician) (1925–2019), Canadian politician
- Bill Dickie (footballer) (1893–1960), Scottish footballer
- Bill Dickie (football administrator) (1929–2012), Scottish football executive
- Charles Dickie (1859–1947), Canadian politician
- David Dickie (1841–1904), Union Army Medal of Honor recipient
- David M. Dickie (born 1829), Canadian politician
- Donald Dickie (born 1972), Australian rules footballer
- Donalda Dickie (1883–1972), Canadian normal school teacher
- Gary Dickie (born 1964), Scottish footballer
- George Dickie (philosopher) (1926–2020), American philosopher
- George Dickie (botanist) (1812–1882), Scottish botanist
- George Dickie (footballer) (1903–1960), Scottish footballer
- Gloria Dickie, Canadian journalist and writer
- Harold Dickie (1874–1954), New Zealand politician
- Harry Chalo Dickie (1913–2008), First Nations chief
- Helen Dickie (1913–1988), American physician
- Ian Dickie (born 1985), Canadian curler
- John Dickie (evangelist) (1823–1891), Scottish evangelist
- John Dickie (British politician) (1874–1963), British politician
- John Dickie (historian) (born 1963), British author, historian and academic
- John Dickie (theologian) (1875–1942), Scottish-New Zealand presbyterian theologian
- John Barnhill Dickie (1829–1886), Canadian politician
- Kate Dickie (born 1971), Scottish actress
- Mat Dickie, English indie video game developer
- Matthew Dickie (1873–1959), Scottish footballer
- Michael Dickie (born 1979), Scottish footballer
- Murdoch Dickie (1919–2004), Scottish footballer
- Murray Dickie (1924–1995), Scottish opera singer
- Neville Dickie (born 1937), English blues and jazz pianist
- Olga Dickie (1900–1992), British/Australian actress
- Pat Dickie (1918–2012), Australian politician
- Percy Dickie (1907–1987), Scottish footballer
- Phil Dickie (born 1955), Australian journalist
- Robert Dickie (boxer) (1964–2010), Welsh boxer
- Robert Dickie (footballer) (born 1996), English footballer
- Robert McGowan Dickie (1784–1854), Canadian judge and politician
- Samuel Dickie (1851–1925), American politician
- Simon Dickie (1951–2017), New Zealand rowing cox
- Thomas Dickie (1860–1935), Canadian politician
- William Dickie (1870–1921), New Zealand politician

=== Nickname ===
- Richard Annand (1914–2004), English recipient of the Victoria Cross
- Dickie Baugh (1864–1929), English footballer
- Dickie Bird (born 1933), English cricket umpire
- Dickie Boon (1878–1961), Canadian ice hockey player
- Dickie Brooks (born 1943), English cricketer
- Dickie Burrough (1909–1994), English cricketer
- Richard John Cork (1917–1944), Second World War fighter ace
- Dickie Dale (1927–1961), motorcycle road racer
- Dickie Dale (footballer) (c. 1896–1970), English footballer
- Dickie Davies (1928–2023), British television presenter
- Richard Dawson (1932–2012), British-American actor, comedian, game show host
- Dickie Downs (1886–1949), English footballer
- Dickie Foss (1912–1995), English football player and coach
- Dickie Fuller (1913–1987), West Indian cricketer
- Dickie Goodman (1934–1989), American comedian
- Dickie Guy (born 1949), English football goalkeeper
- Richard Haine (1916–2008), English Second World War RAF pilot
- Dickie Hemric (1933–2017), American basketball player
- Dickie Henderson (1922–1985), British actor
- Dickie Little, American musician, The Ziggens
- Dickie Lloyd (1891–1950), Irish cricketer
- Dickie Moore (actor) (1925–2015), American child actor
- Dickie Moore (ice hockey) (1931–2015), Canadian ice hockey player
- Dickie Peterson (1946–2009), American singer
- Dickie Post (born 1945), American football player
- Dickie Rock (born 1936), Irish rock singer
- Dickie Stobbart (1891–1952), Canadian soccer player
- Dickie Thon (born 1958), American baseball player
- Richard Gordon Wakeford (1922–2007), British Royal Air Force air marshal
- Dickie Watmough (1912–1962), English footballer and cricketer

=== Given name ===
- Dickie Harris (born 1950), Canadian football player
- Dickie Noles (born 1956), baseball player

== Fictional characters ==
- Boerke, a comic strip character known as Dickie in some languages
- Dickie Dare, a comic strip character
- Dickie Flemming, in the soap opera Coronation Street
- Billericay Dickie, in the song of the same name
- Dickie Duck, a Disney character in the Donald Duck universe
- Dickie Greenleaf, in the film The Talented Mr. Ripley
- Dickie Moltisanti, the father of Christopher Moltisanti from The Sopranos

== See also ==
- Dickie (disambiguation)
- Dickey (name)
- Dicky (name)
