= Dickey (name) =

Dickey is a Scottish surname, nickname, and given name. It may refer to:

== People with the surname ==
- Annamary Dickey (1911–1999}. American actress
- Anne Alexander Dickey (1843–1940), Hawaiian clubwoman
- Basil Dickey (1880–1958), American screenwriter
- Bill Dickey (1907–1993), American baseball player and manager
- Bob Dickey (born 1939), American politician from Nebraska
- Bronwen Dickey (born 1981), American writer and journalist
- Charles William Dickey (1871–1942), American architect
- Christopher Dickey (1951–2020) American writer
- Dale Dickey (born 1961), American actress
- Darrell Dickey (born 1959), American football coach and former player
- Daryl Dickey (born 1961), American football administrator, former coach, and former player
- Derrek Dickey (1951–2000), American basketball player and sportscaster
- Dick Dickey (1926–2006), American basketball player
- Donald Ryder Dickey (1887–1932) American animal photographer, ornithologist and mammalogist
- Doug Dickey (born 1932), American former football player, coach and athletics administrator
- Eldridge Dickey (1945–2000), American football player
- Ebenezer V. Dickey (1821–1857), American politician from Pennsylvania
- E.M.O'R. Dickey (1894–1977), Irish wood engraver and arts administrator
- Eric Jerome Dickey (1961–2021), African-American novelist and comedian
- George Dickey (disambiguation)
- Glen Dickey, American politician
- James Dickey (disambiguation)
- Jasmine Dickey (born 2000), American basketball player
- Jay Dickey (1939–2017), American politician
- Jesse Column Dickey, US Congressman
- Jim Dickey (1934–2018), American former football player and coach, father of Darrell Dickey
- John Dickey (disambiguation)
- Lucinda Dickey (born 1960), American dancer and actress
- Lynn Dickey (born 1949), American former football player
- R. A. Dickey (born 1974), American baseball pitcher
- Robert J. Dickey, American businessman
- Theophilus Lyle Dickey (1811–1885), American lawyer, jurist and American Civil War Union Army colonel
- Whit Dickey (born 1954), American jazz drummer
- William Dickey (disambiguation)

== People with the nickname ==
- Dickey Betts (born 1943), American guitarist
- Dickey Chapelle (1919–1965), American photojournalist and war correspondent
- Dickey Kerr (1893–1963), American Major League Baseball pitcher
- Dickey Lee (born 1936), American pop/country singer and songwriter
- Dickey Pearce (1836–1908), American baseball player, a pioneer of the shortstop position and possibly one of the first professionals
- Dickey Simpkins (born 1973), American former National Basketball Association player

== People with the given name ==
- Dickey Nutt (born 1959), American college basketball coach

== See also ==
- Dickey (disambiguation)
- Justice Dickey (disambiguation)
- Dicky (name)
- Dickie (name)
