= Dick (nickname) =

- Pronunciation: /dɪk/ DICK
- Gender: Male
- Language: English

Origin
- Languages: 1. Frankish; 2. Proto-Germanic; 3. English
- Origin: Diminutive form of Richard
- Region of origin: English-speaking world

Other names
- Alternative spelling: Dicky; Dickie; Dickey
- Related names: Richard, Dickie, Dickey, Dicky, Dickson, Dixon

Dick is a nickname most often for Richard, which likely originated in the Middle Ages as a rhyming nickname for "Rick", similarly to the development of William → Will → Bill and Robert → Rob → Bob. Dick is a cliché name for any man, as in Tom, Dick and Harry. The use of the nickname Dick has declined drastically in recent decades due to the association of Dick with a penis; by 1969, Dick had fallen outside of the top 1,000 most common names for newborn baby boys in the US. By 2014, there were fewer than five babies born in the United States with the name Dick on a birth certificate.

Notable people named Dick include:

== People ==
- Dick Advocaat (born 1947), Dutch football manager and former player
- Dick Ambrose (born 1953), American football linebacker in the National Football League
- Dick Anthony (1939–2022), American forensic psychologist
- Dick Armey (born 1940), American politician
- Dick Assman (1934–2016), Canadian gas station worker
- Dick Attlesey (1929–1984), American hurdler
- Dick Ault (1925–2007), American hurdler
- Dick Axelsson (born 1987), Swedish ice hockey player
- Dick Barber (1910–1983), American long jumper
- Dick Bavetta (born 1939), American National Basketball Association referee
- Dick Benschop (born 1957), Dutch politician and corporate executive
- Dick Berlijn (born 1950), retired Royal Netherlands Air Force four-star general and former Chief of Defence of the Netherlands
- Dick Blair (1937–2013), Australian boxer, pastor, and community leader
- Dick Blumenthal, (born 1946), American politician
- Dick Bown (1928–2024), American racing driver
- Dick Butkus (1942–2023), American football player, sports commentator, and actor
- Dick Button (1929–2025), American figure skater and skating analyst
- Dick Cavett (born 1936), American television talk show host
- Dick Cheney (1941–2025), American politician, 46th vice president of the United States
- Dick Clark (disambiguation)
  - Dick Clark (1929–2012), American radio and television personality
- Dick Conger (1921–1970), American major league baseball pitcher
- Dick Contino (1930–2017), American accordionist
- Dick Costolo (born 1963), American businessman, former CEO of Twitter
- Dick Couch, American writer
- Dick Cox (1897–1966), American baseball player
- Dick Dale (1937–2019), American musician known as "King of the Surf Guitar"
- Dick Davis (disambiguation)
- Dick Deer Slayer, American football player
- Dick Dietz (1941–2005), American baseball player
- Dick Durbin (born 1944), American politician and United States senator
- Dick Donner
- Dick Enberg (1935–2017), American sportscaster
- Dick Fencl (1910–1972), American football player
- Dick Gordon (disambiguation)
- Dick Graves (1912–1990), American casino owner
- Dick Gregory (1932–2017), American civil rights activist and comedian
- Dick Groat (1930–2023), American baseball and basketball player
- Dick Head (footballer) (1887–1940), Australian rules footballer
- Dick Hoblitzell (1888–1962), American Major League Baseball player
- Dick Hurley (1847–aft. 1916), American baseball player
- Dick Ives (1926–1997), American basketball player
- Dick Jensen (1942–2006), American musical performer
- Dick Johnson (academic) (1929–2019), Australian Classics professor and senior public servant
- Dick Johnson (clarinetist) (1925–2010), American big band clarinetist with the Artie Shaw Band
- Dick Johnson (footballer) (1895–1933), English footballer
- Dick Johnson (glider pilot) (1923–2008), glider pilot, aeronautical engineer and writer
- Dick Johnson (reporter) (1953–2020), American television news anchor and reporter
- Dick Johnson (test pilot) (1917–2002), founding member of the Society of Experimental Test Pilots
- Dick Johnson (racing driver) (born 1945), Australian racing driver and team owner
- Dick Johnson (rugby league) (1916–1984), Australian rugby league footballer
- Dick Johnson (sailor) (1923–2005), sailor from United States Virgin Islands
- Dick Johnson, subject of Dick Johnson Is Dead, a 2020 American documentary about a man with dementia
- Dick Johnston (1863–1934), American baseball player
- Dick Johnston (journalist) (1919–2008), Canadian sportswriter
- Dick Kavner, trade unionist
- Dick Kempthorn (1926–2019), American collegiate athlete, Air Force pilot, and businessman
- Dick King (1811–1871), English trader and colonist in Africa
- Dick King (American football) (1895–1930), American football player
- Dick King (politician) (1934–2018), American politician
- Dick King-Smith (1922–2011), English author
- Dick Kranzler (born 1938), American racing driver
- Dick Lee (disambiguation)
- Dick Marx (1924–1997), American jazz musician
- Dick Murdoch (1946–1996), American professional wrestler
- Dick Pole (born 1950), American baseball player and coach
- Dick Pound (born 1942), Canadian swimming champion and first president of the World Anti-Doping Agency
- Dick Powell (1904–1963), American actor and musician
- Dick Reynolds (1915–2002), Australian rules footballer
- Dick Ricketts (1933–1988), American basketball and baseball player
- Dick Roth (1947–2025), American 1964 Olympic gold medalist swimmer
- Dick Rutkowski, American diving medicine pioneer
- Dick Sargent (1930–1994), American actor
- Dick Savitt (1927–2023), American tennis player
- Dick Schoof (born 1957), Prime Minister of the Netherlands from 2024 to 2026
- Dick Schweidler (1914–2010), American football player
- Dick Shawn (1923–1987), American actor and comedian
- Dick Shikat (1897–1968), German professional wrestler and world heavyweight champion
- Dick Shiner (born 1942), American football player
- Dick Smith (entrepreneur), Australian businessman
- Dick Smothers (born 1939), one of the American folk singer-comedian duo the Smothers Brothers
- Dick Stanfel (1927–2015), American football player
- Dick Such (born 1944), American baseball player and coach
- Dick Tarnstrom (born 1975), Swedish ice hockey player
- Dick Tayler (born 1948), New Zealand long-distance runner
- Dick Teague (1923–1991), American industrial designer
- Dick Thornburgh (1932–2024), American politician, Governor of Pennsylvania, and United States Attorney General
- Dick Trickle (1941–2013), American race car driver
- Dick Turpin (1705–1739), English highwayman executed for horse theft
- Dick Van Dyke (born 1925), American actor, comedian, writer and producer
- Dick Van Patten (1928–2015), American actor
- Dick Vermeil (born 1936), National Football League coach
- Dick Vitale (born 1939), American basketball sportscaster
- Dick Wagner (baseball) (1927–2006), American baseball executive
- Dick Weisgerber (1915–1984), player in the National Football League
- Dick Wolf, American television producer
- Dick Woodson (born 1945), American baseball player
- Dick York (1928–1992), American actor

== Fictional characters ==
- Dick and Jane, main characters in a children's reading book series
- Dick Baker, from the co-op mode of Dead Rising 3
- Dick Knubbler, from Adult Swim series Metalocalypse
- Dick Gansey III, from The Raven Cycle, a series of fantasy novels by Maggie Stiefvater
- Dick Grayson, the civilian identity of Robin and other superhero aliases in the DC Universe
- Dick Gumshoe, from the visual novel series Ace Attorney
- Dick Halloran, from the novel The Shining
- Dick Harper, one of the title characters in a 1977 film Fun with Dick and Jane, remade in 2005
- Dick Loudon, the protagonist the TV show Newhart
- Dick Roman, in the TV show Supernatural
- Dick Solomon, the High Commander of the alien visitors in 3rd Rock from the Sun
- Dick Tracy, in the comic strip of the same name
- Dick Whitman, the birth name of Donald Draper, the main character in Mad Men

== See also ==
- Richard Nixon (1913–1994), President of the United States nicknamed "Tricky Dick"
- Dickey
- Dickie
- Dicky
