= John Dickie =

John Dickie may refer to:

- John Dickie (evangelist) (1823–1891), Scottish evangelist and writer
- John Dickie (historian) (born 1963), British author, historian and academic
- John Dickie (theologian) (1875–1942), New Zealand Presbyterian theologian and professor
- John Purcell Dickie (1874–1963), British politician
- John Barnhill Dickie (1829–1886), farmer, teacher and political figure in Nova Scotia, Canada
- John Dickie (footballer) (1900–1976), Scottish footballer, played for Barrow; see 1923–24 Rochdale A.F.C. season

== See also ==
- John Dickey (disambiguation)
