= Bill Dickie =

Bill Dickie may refer to:

- Bill Dickie (ice hockey) (1916–1997), Canadian ice hockey goaltender
- Bill Dickie (association football) (1929–2012), President of the Scottish Football Association
- Bill Dickie (politician) (1925–2019), lawyer and politician from Alberta, Canada
- Bill Dickie (footballer) (1893–1960), footballer for Chelsea and Stoke

== See also ==
- Bill Dickey (1907–1993), American baseball catcher and manager
- William Dickie (1869–1921), Liberal Party Member of Parliament in New Zealand
- William Dickey (disambiguation)
