= Robert Dickie =

Robert Dickie may refer to:

- Robert Dickie (boxer) (1964–2010), Welsh professional boxer
- Robert Dickie (footballer) (born 1996), English professional footballer
- Robert McGowan Dickie (c. 1784–1854), judge and political figure in Nova Scotia

== See also ==
- Robert Dickey (disambiguation)
