= Bill Dickie (ice hockey) =

Canadian ice hockey player

- Born: February 20, 1916 Campbellton, New Brunswick, Canada
- Died: December 23, 1997 (aged 81) Montreal, Quebec, Canada
- Height: 6 ft 0 in (183 cm)
- Weight: 185 lb (84 kg; 13 st 3 lb)
- Position: Goaltender
- Caught: Right
- Played for: Chicago Black Hawks
- Playing career: 1937–1942

William Rufus Dickie (February 20, 1916 – December 23, 1997) was a Canadian chemist and professional ice hockey goaltender who played in one National Hockey League game for the Chicago Black Hawks during the 1941–42 season. Dickie replaced Sam LoPresti in a 4–3 victory over the Montreal Canadiens on February 5, 1942.

== Early life ==
Born in Campbellton, New Brunswick, Dickie played for Campbellton Collegiate in 1932 and 1933. He attended Mount Allison University from 1933 to 1937 where, as a goaltender, he was captain of the Mount Allison Mounties.

== Career ==
Dickie played for the Saint John Beavers in Saint John, New Brunswick, from 1937 to 1939. A chemist by training, Dickie was working for the Dominion Steel and Coal Corporation's steel mill in Sydney, Nova Scotia, at the start of World War II and played for the Sydney Millionaires from 1939 to 1941. Dickie moved to Montreal and played for the Montreal Pats in 1941 and 1942. It was during this season that he was called up to play a single game for the Chicago Black Hawks.

== Career statistics ==
=== Regular season and playoffs ===
			Regular season								Playoffs
Season	Team	League	GP	W	L	T	Min	GA	SO	GAA	GP	W	L	T	Min	GA	SO	GAA
1933–34	Mount Allison University	MIHC	4	3	1	0	240	3	2	0.75	—	—	—	—	—	—	—	—
1933–34	Mount Allison University	NBCHL	7	7	0	0	430	11	1	1.53	2	2	0	0	120	3	0	1.50
1933–34	Mount Allison University	Al-Cup	—	—	—	—	—	—	—	—	6	3	2	1	360	20	0	3.33
1934–35	Mount Allison University	MIHC	4	3	0	1	250	10	0	2.40	—	—	—	—	—	—	—	—
1934–35	Mount Allison University	NBCHL	6	2	4	0	370	15	0	2.43	2	1	1	0	120	6	0	3.00
1935–36	Mount Allison University	Exhib	1	0	1	0	60	2	0	2.00	—	—	—	—	—	—	—	—
1936–37	Mount Allison University	MIHC	4	3	0	1	240	3	2	0.75	1	0	1	0	60	6	0	6.00
1937–38	Saint John Beavers	NBSHL	29	16	11	1	1780	69	4	2.33	4	1	3	0	195	11	0	3.39
1938–39	Saint John Beavers	Exhib	34	20	9	5	2050	85	4	2.49	—	—	—	—	—	—	—	—
1938–39	Saint John Beavers	Al-Cup	—	—	—	—	—	—	—	—	13	8	4	1	809	38	1	2.82
1939–40	Sydney Millionaires	CBHSL	35	26	8	1	2100	85	5	2.43	4	3	1	0	240	13	0	3.25
1939–40	Sydney Millionaires	Al-Cup	—	—	—	—	—	—	—	—	11	8	2	1	670	31	1	2.78
1940–41	Sydney Millionaires	CBHSL	40	24	15	1	2400	125	3	3.12	4	1	3	0	120	11	0	5.50
1940–41	Sydney Millionaires	Al-Cup	—	—	—	—	—	—	—	—	17	10	5	2	1040	53	1	3.06
1941–42	Chicago Black Hawks	NHL	1	1	0	0	60	3	0	3.00	—	—	—	—	—	—	—	—
1941–42	Montreal Pats	QSHL	40	10	21	9	2400	139	2	3.48	—	—	—	—	—	—	—	—
NHL totals			1	1	0	0	60	3	0	3.00	—	—	—	—	—	—	—	—

== See also ==
- List of players who played only one game in the NHL
