= Sittingbourne F.C. =

Association football club in England

Coordinates: 51°18′52″N 0°43′46″E

Sittingbourne
- Full name: Sittingbourne Football Club
- Nickname: The Brickies
- Founded: 1886; 140 years ago
- Ground: The Staxson Stadium, Woodstock Park, Sittingbourne
- Capacity: 1,930
- Owner: Sittingbourne Football Club Limited (11360242)
- Chairman: Maurice Dunk
- Manager: Joe Anderson (Interim)
- League: Isthmian League South East Division
- 2025–26: Isthmian League South East Division, 5th of 22
Home colours	Away colours

Sittingbourne Football Club are an English football club based in Sittingbourne, Kent. The club colours are black and red, they play home matches at The Staxson Stadium, Woodstock Park, and are nicknamed 'the Brickies'. Sittingbourne currently play in the Isthmian League South East Division.

The club was established in 1886, and eight seasons later they were founder members of the Kent League. They have played predominately in semi-professional leagues based in south-east England: the original Kent League, the South Eastern League, the Southern League, the reincarnated Kent League, the Isthmian League and (as a subsidiary competition periodically between 1901 and 1964) the Thames and Medway Combination.

The club's best performances in the FA Cup occurred in the 1920s, reaching the sixth qualifying round on one occasion and the second round proper twice. They are the only club (as of 2025) to have completed a season unbeaten in the revived Kent League/SCEFL, which they achieved in 1990–91. The farthest they have progressed in the FA Trophy is to the quarter-finals, in the 2024–25 season.

== History ==
See: List of Sittingbourne F.C. seasons

Although an earlier Sittingbourne United club had been playing since 1881, Sittingbourne F.C. traces its lineage to 1886 when the club was reorganised under its current name. After playing at the Recreation Ground and then the original Gore Court the club moved to a field behind the Bull pub in 1892, where they were to remain for ninety-eight years. The club acquired Senior status in 1893, and entered the FA Cup for the first occasion in 1893–1994, losing at home 6–0 to the 1st Highland Light Infantry.

=== 1894 to 1959: Kent, South Eastern and Southern Leagues ===
In 1894 Sittingbourne were a founder club of Division One of the original Kent League (with a reserve side playing in Division Two), finishing sixth from nine teams. The club was nicknamed 'The Brickies', owing to the town having a major brick-making industry. They achieved their first FA Cup victory in the 1894–1895 competition, defeating Ashford United 4–0 away in the first qualifying round before losing in the next round 8–0 at Chatham. In 1896 the club were disqualified from the competition after prioritising a Kent League match over a second replay against Romford. An enduring club record was established over the 1895–1896 Kent League season when they conceded in excess of 3.3 goals per league match played (73 goals over twenty-two matches). Initially run on an amateur basis, Sittingbourne FC adopted professionalism for the 1898–99 season.

The club were Kent League Division One runners-up for two successive seasons, 1900–01 and 1901–02 – in the latter season they tied on points for top spot but lost a Championship play-off match 1–0 against Cray Wanderers; in the season the club conceded only thirteen goals over twenty Kent League fixtures – a rate of 0.65 per match, a then record low that would stand for eighty-nine seasons – with goalkeeper J Macey keeping ten clean sheets. There was a success that season for 'The Brickies' when they won the Kent Senior Cup defeating Ashford United in the final 4–1 after a replay, having equalised through a penalty two minutes from time in the first match. From the 1901–02 season the club began additionally playing in the Thames and Medway Combination as a subsidiary competition. The following 1902–03 season Sittingbourne won both leagues in which they competed: they were champions of Kent League Division One, in which they lost only one match from sixteen played and conceded only eleven goals with goalkeeper Macey keeping eight clean sheets; and champions of the Thames and Medway Combination, in which they lost only one match from twelve played and conceded only eight goals with Macey keeping seven clean sheets. Following successive third-place finishes in the Kent League over the next two seasons the club resigned from the league in 1905 and became members of the South Eastern League, joining Division Two.

Sittingbourne were runners-up in their initial season in the South Eastern League and earned promotion to Division One – scoring eighty two goals over twenty-two matches, a club enduring record rate of 3.7 goals per game. Playing mostly against reserves teams from higher leagues based over a larger geographic area than the Kent League – the majority of clubs were London based however there were also journeys to Norwich, Luton and Brighton – in the following season 'the Brickies' finished sixth in their first season in Division One. Following two losing seasons where the club finished towards the bottom of the table they left the South Eastern League and returned, in 1909, to the reconstituted and enlarged Kent League. During this period, Sittingbourne were champions of the 1907–08 season Thames and Medway Combination (the league comprising five clubs) and runners-up of that league the following season (losing-out to Sheppey United in a first place play-off match). In a disappointing sequence the club were losing finalists in four of the five Kent Senior Cup finals between 1904 and 1908. The club was involved in a significant transfer in 1905 when it received a £25 fee for right winger Alex Birnie from Football League First Division club Everton.

Over the first season of their return to the Kent League, 1909–10, Sittingbourne were Division One runners-up and the following season reached the Kent Senior Cup final but again did not win the trophy. In 1911–12, the club were winners for a third occasion of the Thames and Medway Combination (over three other competing teams). The Kent League was suspended in 1914 owing to World War I and the club disbanded. It reformed in 1919 and resumed as a member of the Kent League and in July 1921 a club Supporters Association was formed. The club were league runners-up in the 1922–23 season in which, over thirty-two league matches, they scored a then club highest season total of 102 goals conceding only twenty (with sixteen clean sheets); Joe Bailey was the club top scorer netting forty-one of the 136 club goals scored in all matches. In the 1925–26 season 'the Brickies' finished third in the table and over 36 matches scored an all-time highest club total of 122 goals surpassing the total from three seasons previously (with centre-forward Sutch scoring forty-four of the club all matches total of 166 goals scored); that season they won the Kent League Cup defeating Ashford Railway Works 3–1 in a replay (following a 3–3 draw in the first tie in which Sittingbourne failed to score from a twice taken penalty in extra-time). The club were Kent League runners-up once again over the 1926–27 campaign in which, for the only occasion to date (as of 2025), they did not draw any of the matches they played in their primary league competition (P26; W20; L6). The club continued to be members of the Thames and Medway Combination and were Champions in the 1924–25, 1925–26 and 1927–28 seasons (competing against two clubs in the first season and then against three in the other two). The club though suffered three more reverses in the Kent Senior Cup finals of 1923, 1925 and 1928, creating a competition record sequence of being losing finalists on eight (non-consecutive) occasions.

In the 1922–23 FA Cup competition the club, captained by former Football League player Bill Dickie and including other former Football League players John Bethune, Ralph Shields, Syd Gore and George Bertram, won through a preliminary and three qualifying rounds to win their qualifying division, after which in the fourth qualifying round they were eliminated 4–2 following a replay by Southend United of the Football League Third Division South. There followed during the following six seasons the three best ever performances by the club in the FA Cup competition, curtailed on each occasion by clubs from the Third Division South: the club received a bye from the initial qualifying division in the 1923–24 competition and joined it at the fourth qualifying round stage, after victories over Dulwich Hamlet and St Albans City the club progressed to the sixth qualifying round (the last 76 clubs) before being defeated 2–0 at home by Exeter City; two seasons later, 1925–26, the club, having first disposed of Sheppey United following a replay in the fourth and concluding qualifying round and then Chatham in the first round proper, reached the FA Cup second round proper (the last 83 clubs) where they were heavily defeated 7–0 at Swindon Town; in the 1928–29 competition, after victories over Tunbridge Wells Rangers and Southall 'the Brickies' were narrowly defeated in the second round proper (the last 81 clubs) 2–1 at Walsall.

In 1927, having resigned from the Kent League (which had decreased from nineteen teams two seasons previously to fourteen), Sittingbourne joined the exodus to the Southern League, becoming members of the Eastern Division. Over the close season, the club members decided to convert the organisation to a Limited Company – the other option being to fold the business as the guarantors of the club, with a £400 deficit to hand, were unwilling to be personally liable for future losses. The club played in the Eastern Division of the Southern League for three seasons – this division included some Kent based clubs but also involved travel outside the county to as far afield as Poole, Kettering and Norwich. In their first season, 1927–28, the club were at the head of the table in October having won eight of eleven matches but thereafter only a further eight more wins over the remaining twenty-three matches resulted in an eighth-placed finish in the table. In March, the club received a transfer fee of £100 for right half Lem Newcomb from Millwall – the club with whom it was reported that Sittingbourne had a loose nursery arrangement. Sittingbourne, now a limited company, at their first annual meeting in August 1928 reported a loss of £600 over the previous season and, looking to improve and expand spectator and club facilities, launched a £2,000 debenture scheme to fund a new stand at the Bull Ground. The stand was opened in November 1929, but it had been disclosed at the club's annual meeting a few months previously that the debenture scheme was under-subscribed, placing a financial burden on the club. Over the next two seasons, as the club economised on playing staff, it finished towards the bottom of the Eastern Division table. During this period, Sittingbourne broke their sequence of losing Kent Senior Cup finals with back-to-back victories: in the 1928–29 season with a 1–0 replay win against Sheppey United, and in 1929–30 defeating Margate 3–0.

Having accumulated losses of £2,000 over three seasons playing in the Southern League in 1930, the club decided to withdraw and return to the Kent League and appointed long-time player Bill Dickie as player-manager; however, he left before the end of the first season, owing to the club cutting his wages. The club recorded a mid-table position in the 1930–31 season Kent League table, incurring a £700 loss; in May 1931, under the strain of accumulated heavy debt, the club returned to amateurism to reduce costs. In the following 1931–32 season, the club slumped to a low point of eighteenth from nineteen clubs in the Kent League table, winning only six matches with a then club record of 111 league goals conceded (at a rate just in excess of 3 per match). Sittingbourne did not enter the FA Cup that season and remained absent from the competition until 1947. Early the following 1932–33 season, still under acute financial pressure, the club limited company was liquidated – the football operation of Sittingbourne was rescued by the Supporters Association who took over running the club; the club finished in mid-table and conceded 109 league goals at a rate of 3.2 per match. Over the next seven seasons of playing in the Kent League, until it was suspended in September 1939 owing to World War II, 'the Brickies' occupied mid-table positions. After the league was paused, Sittingbourne continued to play friendly matches until February 1941, after which enemy bombing made the club's ground unusable and the club was discontinued.

Sittingbourne FC was reformed in 1946 as a professional club run by a committee and rejoined the Kent League; the Supporters Association was also reformed but no longer had responsibility for running the club. Bill Dickie was installed as trainer-coach, but in December 1946 he stepped down owing to ill-health and was replaced by former Fulham forward John Finch who was appointed player-manager; he resigned shortly after the season ended. Over that 1946–47 season, in which the club finished in mid-table, the players included three Hales brothers with 'Nobby' Hales leading scorer with thirty-four goals, attendances at home matches were in excess of 1,700, and the club reported a financial surplus for the season. During the following three seasons on the field, the club recorded mid/lower table returns, but off the field financial losses began to accrue and the club were in debt at the end of the 1948–49 season. With financial assistance from the Supporters Association and a Donations and Appeal fund, the club was reported as being debt-free at the end of the following season. From the 1950–51 season, results improved with the club featuring towards the top of the Kent League table. In July 1952, after being tenants for sixty years, the club purchased the freehold of their Bull Ground for a total outlay of £5,270 with financial assistance from the club's Supporters Association and a loan from the FA.

In the summer of 1953, the club appointed former Leyton Orient defender Arthur Banner as player-manager. He left in January 1956, to take up a non-football related opportunity, with a record of 66 wins from 123 matches. The team fashioned by him were the 1955–56 season champions of the six clubs of the Thames and Medway Combination. In April 1956, experienced former Football League player Walter Rickett was recruited as the replacement player-manager. In the Kent League over both the 1957–58 and 1958–59 seasons, the last of the league's existence, Sittingbourne were Kent League Division One Champions. In an era of two points for a win, in the former season, they won the league by seven points, losing only three from 34 matches and conceding twenty-eight goals, less than a goal per game; and in the latter season, they won by nine points, losing only two from 34 matches conceding twenty-five goals again at less than parity. There were double celebrations in 1957–58 when 'the Brickies' won the Kent Senior Cup defeating Ramsgate Athletic 1–0; and triple celebrations in 1958–59 when they won the inter-divisional play-off (defeating Ramsgate Athletic 5–2) to win the Thames and Medway Combination and defeated Margate 3–2 to win the Kent League Cup to achieve the league and cup double (this match being their fourteenth straight win and twenty-fourth match without defeat). Towards the end of this successful period, in November 1958, manager Rickett submitted his notice of resignation and left in February 1959 moving to Ramsgate Athletic. He was succeeded as manager by Ike Clarke a former Yeovil Town player-manager who was at the helm of the club for the triple celebrations.

=== 1959 to 1967: Southern League ===
Following the demise of the Kent League in 1959 Sittingbourne became members of the Southern League joining at their second tier Division One level along with eight former Kent League adversaries. For the first two seasons in the division, 1959–60 and 1960–61 the club missed out on promotion to the Premier Division owing to an inferior goal average to the club in the final promotion position. The club reached the Kent Senior Cup final in 1960–61 but were not victorious. Manager Clarke resigned in May 1961 and the club reverted to employing a player-manager, Charles Rutter. He steered 'the Brickies' to a top third of the table finish in his first season in charge, 1960–61, after which along with twenty-six non–League clubs Sittingbourne applied for election to the Football League to fill the vacancy created by the collapse of Accrington Stanley; Sittingbourne were one of fifteen other applicants who failed to obtain a single vote (Oxford United from the Southern League Premier Division were elected). In early November 1962, for the last occasion to date (as of 2024), the club reached the proper rounds of the FA Cup, losing 3–0 at fellow Division One South club Hinckley Athletic. This came at a moment when the club had recorded only one win from seven league matches and next suffered a heavy defeat in a Kent Floodlight Cup match; shortly afterwards manager Rutter resigned. For the remainder of the season the team was selected by the management committee and finished towards the foot of the league table. The next managerial appointment was Poole Town manager Ray King who took up his duties in May 1963. During this period the club had continued to compete in, on a subsidiary competition basis, the Thames and Medway Combination and were champions for four consecutive seasons: 1960–61 (when they defeated Ramsgate Athletic 1–0 in the inter-divisional play-off), 1961–62 (when, in a match held-over to the start of the next season, they defeated Herne Bay 2–0 in the inter-divisional play-off), 1962–63 (when it was played as a cup competition, winning the final 4–0 over Tilbury) and in 1963–64 (competing in a four team league). In November 1963 with the club operating at a financial loss, the players' wages were cut, manager King resigned and the club management committee resumed team responsibilities after which the club once again placed in the lower third of the table, but having released eight professional players by the season's end had shored-up the club finances. Running under continued financial constraints and without a professional team manager in the 1964–65 season the club conceded in excess of 100 league goals (as they would over the following two seasons) and finished bottom of the league; but as there was no automatic relegation and courtesy of successful re-election the club maintained their position in Division One of the Southern League. The following campaign with finances remaining problematic the club placed nineteenth from twenty-four teams. Next, over the 1966–67 season in the league Sittingbourne finished bottom of 24 teams, having won a club season low of five matches, for the first time ever scoring at a rate of less than one goal per league match (forty-four goals from forty-six matches played) and conceded a then record 136 league goals (approaching three per match); early in the campaign, with the club continuing to lose money, they announced their intention after an eight-season stay to resign from the Southern League.

=== 1967 to 1991: Kent League ===
For the 1967–68 season Sittingbourne joined the Kent Premier League (which had developed the previous season from the Thames and Medway Combination), replacing their reserves team for the first of what became a twenty-four season stay in the league. In the first season playing once again in a county based league the club finished as runners-up to Margate Reserves – both clubs had fifty points and the final ranking was decided by goal average. The Kent Premier League was renamed as the Kent League from the 1968–69 season and over that and the following three seasons the club achieved consecutive fourth-placed finishes in the table. From June 1971 the club were managed by Tony Oakley, he had previously been a player and had a brief spell as player-manager in 1968. Under his latest managership the club continued to feature towards the top of the table and were runners-up for two consecutive seasons: 1972–73 (when the club scored a then post-war high of 108 league goals over thirty-eight league matches with brothers Richard and Ray Hales netting sixty goals in all competitions between them); and again over the 1973–74 season; in both of these seasons the club conceded fewer than a goal per game. 'The Brickies' also appeared in the Kent League Cup final over these two seasons, losing out in the first and then in the latter they were the Kent League Cup winners defeating Chatham Town 2–1 in the final. In March 1975, with the club at the top of the Kent League table, it received a shock when Oakley died of a heart attack aged 41. In late April Gordon Burden was appointed to oversee the remainder of the season – in which the club recorded a third place in the final table and were losing finalists in the Kent League Cup. Under Burden the club won the Kent League Championship the following season, 1975–76, and almost completed a league and cup double, losing out in a replay in the league cup competition. Burden remained in charge for one more season in which the club were league runners-up. Over the 1977–78 season, initially under Mike Harrington's six-month tenure as manager and then under his replacement Peter Laraman the club dropped from their hitherto leading position to thirteenth in the league. Performances picked-up under Laraman and 'the Brickies' won the Kent League Cup in 1980–81 with a 2–1 win over Darenth Heathside and they re-established their position as one of the better teams in the league based on a tight defence that conceded less than an average of a goal a game in aggregate over the four seasons between 1980 and 1984. Over the 1981–82 season the club came within one point of topping the league and two seasons later in 1983–84 won the Kent League Championship by nine points, winning twenty-four and losing only three of thirty matches. The club then recorded three near misses for trophies: 1985–86 league runners-up (under manager Arthur Ervin); 1986–87 losing finalists after a replay in the Kent League Cup (when Roger Parker was manager); and in and 1989–90 league runners-up again (in manager Hughie Stinson' s second season).

In 1990 the club sold their long-term home, the Bull Ground for reportedly £6.5 million and began developing their new Central Park facility; in September 1990 when the club moved-in the stadium was in the early stages of construction. Playing their first season, 1990–91, at the new ground 'the Brickies' won the modern Kent League title for a third time; their winning margin was twelve points and the club amassed in excess of 100 league points (104) for the then only occasion in the club's history (at a club record rate, applying a consistent three points for a win basis, of 2.6 points per game); the club conceded only nineteen goals (at another club record rate of just less than a goal every two matches), they kept twenty-four clean sheets and were unbeaten over their forty match league campaign (W:32; D:8), a club and Kent League record – and reportedly the only team in Europe to be unbeaten in their league competition. The Kent League was designated a feeder league into the Southern League and Sittingbourne were granted entry into their Southern Division (one of their two-second tier divisions) for the 1991–92 season.

During the preceding 22 seasons the club had played in Football Association organised knock-out tournaments for non-League clubs. The 1969–70 season saw the advent of the FA Trophy, a knock-out tournament for semi-professional clubs. For eighteen seasons (at which point the club qualified for the FA Vase for six seasons) Sittingbourne barely progressed beyond the early qualifying stages. In 1970–71 the club received a bye to the second qualifying round where they were defeated by Deal Town. In 1985–86 the club played in the second qualifying round again, losing to Sheppey United (having beaten Chatham Town in the previous round). From 1987 for six seasons the club qualified for the FA Vase (for clubs playing in the lower tiers of non-League football). In the latter two of these seasons the club won through a preliminary round and then three rounds to reach the fourth round (last thirty-two clubs): in 1991–92 'the Brickies' were defeated by Metropolitan Police and in 1992–93 by Peacehaven & Telscombe. Thereafter the club reverted to competing in the FA Trophy competition.

=== 1991 to 2006: Southern League ===
Sittingbourne's first season in the Southern League Southern Division, 1991–92, in which they finished ninth was not without incident: the club had six league points deducted for fielding two ineligible players and there were managerial changes: at mid-season the club had sacked manager Stinson and temporarily replaced him with his assistant Andy Woolford (who oversaw a six-match unbeaten run and was awarded a 'manager of the month' award) and then appointed former Football League player and former Maidstone United manager John Ryan in early March 1992. Over the following season under Ryan, 1992–93, Sittingbourne won promotion to the Premier Division – scoring 102 goals over their forty-two match campaign, with Dave Arter the club leading scorer with 30 goals; also in their best FA Cup performance for thirty years 'the Brickies' reached the fourth qualifying round before being eliminated in a replay at Marlow. In the Premier Division the next season after challenging at the top of the table in early-March 1994, a run of injuries, the disposal during the season of key goalscorers to refresh the squad (Jason Lillis to Walsall in October, Steve Lovell to Braintree Town in December, and Dave Arter and Jeff Ross to Ashford Town for a combined £7,000 in March), saw a run of one win, four draws and five losses over their final ten matches, in which only nine goals were scored, and a slump to eight in the end of season table. The club had recommenced playing in the FA Trophy this season and reached the third qualifying round (their then best progression in the competition) before losing a home tie 2–1 to Kingstonian. During the season there had been several notable inward transfers: Lee McRobert from Ashford Town (Kent) for £20,000 (the club's record signing), former Margate top-scorer Martin Buglione a £10,000 capture from St Johnstone and for a handful of matches former Liverpool player Jimmy Case played in the team. There were too during and after the season several outward transfers for significant sums: in November 1993 the club sold defensive duo Neil Emblen and Mike Harle to Millwall for a combined fee of £210,00; in June 1994 goalkeeper Lee Harper joined Arsenal for a fee worth up to £150,000; and in July 1994 young forward Steve Forbes went to Millwall for £50,000.

In July 1994 the club members decided that the football club should be controlled by a Limited Company: at the inaugural meeting of the company in September 1994 hitherto Chairman Mick Fletcher, who had overseen the still incomplete development of the Central Park stadium, was not voted onto the new board of Directors with Barry Bright voted the new chairman. Shortly afterwards it was revealed the club, who had sold their Bull Ground four years earlier for £6.5 million, had debts of over one million pounds with a further £685,000 required for completion of the Central Park complex. Performances in the league became a reflection of the financial constraints under which the club were operating and with the club in lower mid-table in early February manager Ryan left and was replaced by Steve Lovell who was appointed as player-manager. A few weeks later Lee McRobert became the fourth player sold by the club to Millwall in three seasons when he departed for £35,000. Lovell could not turn performances around and the club finished the 1994–95 season in the Premier Division relegation places and were sent down to the Southern Division.

In July 1995 the club's financial situation was stabilised when an arrangement was struck with club creditors and the local borough council bought Central Park for a reported £875,000 and leased it back to the club at an annual rental of £75,000. Over the following 1995–96 season, with Lovell remaining as manager, Sittingbourne won the Southern Division scoring 102 goals over 42 matches (with Tommy Planck leading scorer with twenty-one league goals) and bounced back into the Premier Division – also similarly to their promotion season three seasons previously the club progressed to the fourth qualifying round of the FA Cup before exiting the competition, beaten 2–1 at home by Dorchester Town. But all was not well off the pitch and over the following summer, owing to unpaid rent, the club were locked-out of their Central Park ground. In mid-August a deal giving the club a limited licence to use Central Park was signed to enable fixtures to go ahead. The club company was under threat of liquidation and a management committee began to oversee the operations of the club, but with all the financial uncertainty, within a month, player-manager Lovell quit. Alan Walker was appointed in his place and he guided 'the Brickies' to eighth in the 1996–97 Premier Division table and to the third qualifying round in the FA Trophy (before elimination in a replay at Yeading). Over the 1997 close season the club signed a seven-year lease with the new owners of the stadium to secure their future at Central Park. The club, still struggling financially, once again reached the fourth qualifying round of the FA Cup in which they were beaten in a replay 4–1 at Hereford United, but they concluded the season third from bottom of the 1997–98 season league table and were relegated back to the Southern Division. Sittingbourne also achieved further progression than previously in the FA Trophy, into the first round: they were exempt from the competition until the third qualifying round and after a victory over Abingdon Town they reached the first round proper, being defeated 2–1 in a replay at home by St Albans City. The club were exempted the following season until the second round proper but were beaten in that round in a home replay by Crawley Town 5–1.

The club chairman Barry Bright stepped back during the following season, replaced by local businessman Andy Spice at a time when the club were involved in ultimately unrealised merger talks with Sheppey United. Under Spice expenses were further pruned leaving few paid employees remaining – manager Walker left in March 1999 with unpaid Hugh Stinson returning to the club as his replacement. The restricted financial situation of the club influenced results and led to lower table finishes in the league. After almost two seasons Stinson resigned halfway through the 2000–01 season and although his replacement, reserves team manager John Roles, oversaw a minor bounce in results the club finished the season second from the foot of the now named (since the 1999–2000 season) Eastern Division table having scored at a rate of fewer than one goal per league match and in a relegation position; however, owing to the demise of Baldock Town 'the Brickies' were reprieved. On field, poor results continued with mid and lower finishing positions in the league table through to the 2005–06 season under several managers: Mark Beeney appointed October 2001; Steve Nolan, appointed from assistant manager in November 2004 for four months; and Steve Lovell, reappointed to the club in March 2005. During this period, prior to the start of the 2002–03 season, owing to availability issues (caused by televised greyhound racing) the club left Central Park and signed a ten-year lease on what became known as Bourne Park; previously a training pitch adjacent to Central Park which was developed with the aid of volunteers to bring it up to the standard required by the Southern League – including re-using the stand that previously had stood at the Bull Ground.

=== 2006 to date: Isthmian League ===
In 2006 a re-organisation of the English football league system saw Sittingbourne moved sideways into Division One South of the Isthmian League. Over the first four seasons in this division, initially under Lovell and then from November 2007 with Gary Abbott as manager, mid/upper table positions were achieved by the club. Abbott also led 'the Brickies' to a much awaited trophy: in the 2009–10 season, after a gap of 52 years, Sittingbourne won the Kent Senior Cup defeating Folkestone Invicta 3–1 in the final. On being informed that his position would become unpaid, manager Abbott quit in May 2011 and was replaced by his assistant Richard Brady. Shortly afterwards, in September 2011, he and his assistant, ex-Brickie Jamie Coyle, departed to Leatherhead. Long serving player Joe Dowley took over, initially as caretaker before in November 2011 his position was made permanent. On the field in the 2011–12 season, following a reduction in the playing budget, the club slumped to nineteenth from twenty-one clubs in the league table, escaping relegation by two points, after winning only six of forty matches and recording their lowest ever goals scored per league game ratio (0.9). Dowley resigned at the conclusion of the season and was replaced with joint managers, Scottish brothers Jim and Danny Ward (previously of Ramsgate). They oversaw a rise in the club's finishing position in the league table over the 2012–13 season to ninth.

At the end of that season Sittingbourne did not renew their lease at Bourne Park and moved to Woodstock Park, a facility two miles south of the town centre, in a groundshare with Southern Counties East Football League (formerly Kent League) club Woodstock Sports – becoming sole tenants two years later when Woodstock Sports folded. Shortly after the move Spice stood down as chairman of the club and was replaced by former player Maurice Dunk, who resigned as chairman of groundsharing club Woodstock Sports. In September 2013 the Ward brothers quit the club and over the next six seasons through to the 2018–19 season the club produced mid/lower table performances under several managers: from September 2013 joint managers Matt Wyatt with Nick Davis (then a current player and captain); then solely Wyatt for three months from July 2014; followed by former partner Davis from October 2014 for a stay of over three seasons (guiding the club to the semi-finals of the Alan Turvey Trophy (Isthmian League Cup) in the 2015–16 campaign); he was replaced in January 2018 by club coach Aslan Ödev, who remained in post twelve months; and Chris Lynch (formerly the Dover Athletic head of youth development) joined in January 2019.

Off the field, in May 2018 the club business was incorporated as a Limited Company, limited by guarantee (company registration number 11360242). From the 2018–19 season owing to expansion and realignment within the Isthmian League the club were placed in the league's South East Division, one of its three equally ranked second tier divisions. Both the 2019–20 and 2020–2021 seasons were abandoned owing to the COVID 19 pandemic (with the club not performing well in the matches actually played). In the former season after a nine match losing sequence manager Lynch resigned and was replaced by club coach Darren Blackburn who took over in February 2020, just prior to the pandemic induced shutdown. With Blackburn at the helm for the 2021–2022 season, the club achieved a position of tenth in the league table after which former manager Nick Davis was reappointed. Halfway through the following season, after a run of twelve defeats, Davis resigned and was succeeded in January 2023 by Ryan Maxwell (formerly the Braintree Town manager) as both manager and director of football. In his first full season in charge, 2023–24, 'the Brickies' achieved their highest league finishing position in twenty-eight years of third in the Isthmian South East Division table – in one of the promotion play-off positions; in their semi-final play-off match, played at Sittingbourne, the club were defeated 2–1 by Three Bridges.

In 2024–25 Maxwell led the club on their best (to date) run in the FA Trophy. Their highest previously had been playing in the second round (by reason of byes from earlier rounds) in 1997–98 otherwise the club had rarely emerged from the qualifying stages. This season however after commencing their campaign in the first qualifying round and then winning through eight rounds, in the latter of which National League club Southend United playing at home were defeated 1–0, 'the Brickies' reached the quarter-finals. They were eliminated at that stage 3–0 at home in front of 1,300 spectators by another National League club Aldershot Town. In the league over the 2024–25 season the club recorded their second highest ever points total of 101 (eclipsed only by the invincibles team of 1990–91) and with 117 scored their highest number of goals since their best from the 1925–1926 season (of 126 over six fewer matches). However their record of W31; D8; L3 was bettered by Ramsgate which placed the club into the promotion play-offs. Sittingbourne won their semi-final but, watched by stadium record of 1,583 spectators, lost out to Burgess Hill Town in the final 3–2 on penalties (after a 1–1 draw), thus failing to gain promotion. Club top-scorer with 31 goals (22 in regular league matches) was Mitchell May.

In November 2025 Maxwell left the club (to take the manager's job at Welling United). He was replaced by his former assistant Reece Prestedge who led the club to fifth in the 2025–26 season table and qualification for the promotion play-offs in which it was eliminated at the semi-final stage. The company accounts for the twelve months incorporating the season indicated that the football club had increased their financial deficit by £36,424 and its accumulated liabilities of almost £97,000 were mostly supported by directors loans. At the start of November 2026 after almost twelve months as manager and following seven losses over the previous eleven league matches (W2; D2; L7) Prestedge left the club by mutual consent and was replaced on an interim basis by his assistant Joe Anderson.

== Stadium ==
Sittingbourne began playing at the Recreation Ground and then from 1890 home matches took place at the original Gore Court Cricket Ground. In 1892 they moved to a field known as Vallances Meadow behind the Bull pub in the centre of the town; the club fenced the area which then became known as the Bull Ground. In 1928 the club launched a £2,000 debenture scheme to fund a new spectator and club facilities stand at the ground which was opened in November 1929. The club acquired the ground in 1954 for a total outlay of £5,270. In 1990, having played there for a total of 98 years, the club sold the site for reportedly £6.5 million.

The club began building a new stadium on the north-eastern outskirts of the town which was named Central Park Stadium and moved on to the site, which was in the early stages of development, for the 1990–91 season. The playing pitch was part of a complex in which ancillary activities were to be accommodated, these being envisaged as assisting with covering the costs of operating the stadium and financially supporting the football operation.

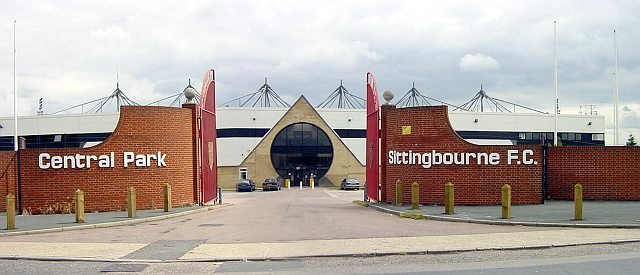
Central Park Stadium, the former home of Sittingbourne F.C.

Overspending on the new ground caused a financial crisis at the football club which was alleviated in July 1995 when the club sold Central Park to the local council for a reported £875,000 and leased it back at an annual rental of £75,000. Greyhound racing, which had been planned when the club owned the ground, commenced at Central Park in October 1995. Following their first season as tenants of the council in July 1996, owing to unpaid rent, the club were locked-out of Central Park, but subsequently allowed limited access to stage matches. The ground was sold on by the council to a company of greyhound racing operators and in June 1997 the club signed a seven-year lease with them to secure use of Central Park as the club's home ground.

Owing to the televising of the greyhound racing the club found it hard to guarantee the availability of the stadium and moved for the 2002–03 season to a former training pitch which was part of the Central Park facility. This required significant work to bring it up to standard (including erection of a stand originally used at the Bull Ground and additional floodlights); the revamped ground was known as Bourne Park and became the club's new home ground. Between 2002 and 2009 the stadium was shared with Maidstone United, and again for the 2011–12 season, after which Maidstone moved into their newly built Gallagher Stadium.

In May 2013, for financial reasons, 'the Brickies' left Bourne Park and moved to the less costly Woodstock Park, a sports ground with an adjacent social club, function and events centre located two miles south of the town centre. Initially the club shared the ground with Southern Counties East League club Woodstock Sports and improvements were required to bring it up to the standard required by the Isthmian League. Woodstock Sports FC folded in 2015 and Sittingbourne became sole tenants. Canterbury City groundshared with Sittingbourne for the 2022–23 season.

In January 2024 detailed plans were unveiled for Highsted Park, a new mixed-use community development to the west of Woodstock Park, which included a new home stadium for Sittingbourne FC. As of March 2025 the plans were under review by the government planning inspectorate.

Stadiums used by Sittingbourne FC

- 1881–1890: Sittingbourne Recreation Ground
- 1890–1892: Gore Court
- 1892–1990: The Bull Ground
- 1990–2002: Central Park
- 2002–2013: Bourne Park
- 2013–present: Woodstock Park. Known for sponsorship reasons as: The Martin & Conley Stadium (2013–2020); The Jarmans Solicitors Stadium (2020–2023); The Roman Stadium (2024); and The Staxson Stadium (2024–present).

== Football management and coaching ==
- Interim Manager: Joe Anderson
- Interim Assistant Manager: Godfey Poku

== Managerial history ==
- Aug-46–Dec-46: Bill Dickie (trainer-coach)
- Dec-46–Jun-47: John Finch
- Jun-53–Jan-56: Arthur Banner
- Apr-56–Feb-59: Walter Rickett
- Feb-59–May-61: Ike Clarke
- Jun-61–Nov-62: Charles Rutter
- May-63–Nov-63: Ray King
- Jun-71–Mar-75: Tony Oakley
- May-75–May-77: Gordon Burden
- May-77–Dec-77: Mike Harrington
- Dec-77–1985: Peter Laraman
- 1985–Feb-87: Arthur Ervin
- Feb-1987–May-88: Roger Parker
- 1988–Jan-92: Hughie Stinson
- Jan-92–Mar-92: Andy Woolford (caretaker)
- Mar-92–Feb-95: John Ryan
- Feb-95–Sep-96: Steve Lovell
- Sep-96–Mar-99: Alan Walker
- Mar-99–Jan-2001: Hughie Stinson
- Jan-01–Sep-01: John Roles
- Oct-01–Nov-04: Mark Beeney
- Nov-04 –Mar-05: Steve Nolan
- Mar-05–Oct-07: Steve Lovell
- Nov-07–Jul-11: Gary Abbott
- Jul-11–Sep-11: Richard Brady
- Sep-11–Apr-12: Joe Dowley
- May-12–Sep-13: Jim & Danny Ward
- Sep-13–Jul-14: Matt Wyatt and Nick Davis
- Jul-14–Oct-14: Matt Wyatt
- Oct-14–Jan-18: Nick Davis
- Jan-18–Jan-19: Aslan Ödev
- Jan-19–Feb-20: Chris Lynch
- Feb-20–May-22: Darren Blackburn
- May-22–Jan-23: Nick Davis
- Jan-23–Nov-25: Ryan Maxwell
- Nov-25-Nov-26: Reece Prestedge
- Nov-26-current: Joe Anderson (interim)

== League history ==
- 1894–1905: Kent League
- 1905–1909: South Eastern League
- 1909–1927: Kent League
- 1927–1930: Southern League: Eastern Division
- 1930–1939: Kent League
- 1946–1959: Kent League
- 1959–1967: Southern League: First Division
- 1967–1968: Kent Premier League (previously Thames & Medway Combination)
- 1968–1991: Kent League (renamed from the Kent Premier League)
- 1991–1993: Southern League: Division One South
- 1993–1995: Southern League: Premier Division
- 1995–1996: Southern League: Division One South
- 1996–1998: Southern League: Premier Division
- 1998–1999: Southern League: Division One South
- 1999–2006: Southern League: Division One East
- 2006–2018: Isthmian League: Division One South
- 2018–present: Isthmian League: Division One South-East

== Honours ==
- Kent League (1894–1959)
  - Division One: Champions: 1902–03; 1957–58; 1958–59.
  - Division One: Runners–up: 1900–01; 1901–02; 1909–10; 1922–23; 1926–27.
  - League Cup Winners: 1925–26; 1958–59.
- Kent League
  - Champions: 1975–76; 1983–84; 1990–91.
  - Runners–up: 1967–68 (Kent Premier League); 1972–73; 1973–74; 1976–77; 1981–82; 1985–86; 1989–90.
  - League Cup Winners: 1973–74; 1980–81.
- South Eastern League
  - Division Two: Runners–up: 1905–06.
- Southern League
  - South Division: Champions: 1992–93; 1995–96.
- Thames and Medway Combination
  - Champions: 1902–03; 1907–08; 1911–12; 1924–25; 1925–26; 1927–28; 1955–56; 1958–59; 1960–61; 1961–62; 1962–63 (cup competition winner); 1963–64.
- Kent Senior Cup
  - Winners: 1901–1902; 1928–1929; 1929–1930; 1957–1958; 2009–2010.

== Club records ==
- Best league performance: Pre-Conference/National League: Eighth in the Southern League Eastern Division 1927–28
- Post-Conference/National League: Eighth in the Southern League Premier Division, 1993–94 and 1996–97
- Best FA Cup performance: Second round, 1925–26, 1928–29
- Best FA Trophy performance: Quarter-finals, 2024–25
- Best FA Vase performance: Fourth round, 1991–92, 1992–93
- Record attendance: 5,951 vs Tottenham Hotspur, friendly, 26 January 1993
- Biggest victory: 15–0 vs Woolwich, Kent League, 1922–23
- Heaviest defeat: 0–10 vs Wimbledon, Southern League Cup, 1965–66
- Longest unbeaten run: 32 games 2024–25
