= Dikki =

Dikki or DIKKI may refer to:

- Dikki John Martinez (born 1991), Filipino figure skater
- Dikki Madhava Rao (1919–1985), Indian actor and singer born Murali Madhava Rao
- Richarda Morrow-Tait (1923–1982), nicknamed "Dikki", English pilot, the first woman to circumnavigate the world
- Democratic Social Movement (Greek: Dimokratiko Koinoniko Kinima, DIKKI), a Greek political party

== See also ==
- Dicky (disambiguation)
