= George Dickie =

George Dickie may refer to:

- George Dickie (philosopher) (1926–2020), philosopher of art
- George Dickie (footballer) (1903–1960), Scottish footballer
- George Dickie (botanist) (1812–1882), Scottish botanist

== See also ==
- George Dickey (disambiguation)
