= Mark Beeney =

English footballer

Personal information
- Full name: Mark Raymond Beeney
- Date of birth: 30 December 1967 (age 58)
- Place of birth: Pembury, England
- Height: 6 ft 4 in (1.93 m)
- Position: Goalkeeper

Team information
- Current team: Chelsea (Goalkeeping coach)

Senior career*
Years	Team	Apps	(Gls)
1986–1987	Gillingham	2	(0)
1987–1991	Maidstone United	50	(0)
1989–1990	→ Aldershot (loan)	7	(0)
1990–1993	Brighton & Hove Albion	69	(0)
1993–1999	Leeds United	35	(0)
2000–2001	Doncaster Rovers		
2001	Dover Athletic		
2001–2003	Sittingbourne	7	(0)

International career
1989	England C	1	(0)
- * Club domestic league appearances and goals

Mark Raymond Beeney (born 30 December 1967) is an English football coach and former professional footballer, who is a goalkeeping coach for Premier League side Chelsea's reserve and youth teams.

As a player, he was a goalkeeper from 1986 to 2003. He played in the Premier League for Leeds United. He also played for Gillingham, Maidstone United, Aldershot, Brighton & Hove Albion, Doncaster Rovers, Dover Athletic and Sittingbourne.

== Playing career ==
He began his career with Gillingham in 1986 and after one season he moved to Maidstone United. He remained with Maidstone until 1991 where he joined Brighton & Hove Albion. He then moved to Leeds United in 1993 and served as backup to John Lukic and then Nigel Martyn. In 2001, he joined Doncaster Rovers and then joined non-league side Dover Athletic in 2001 before retiring.

== Coaching career ==
After his retirement he spent a little time as a player/coach at Sittingbourne before taking up the Academy Goalkeeping Coach role at Chelsea. He has worked closely with a number of young stoppers. In September 2007, when Jose Mourinho and his staff left the club, Beeney was temporarily promoted to first team goalkeeping coach and worked with Petr Čech and Carlo Cudicini until the club hired Christophe Lollichon. He now continues his work with the Reserves and Academy.

== Personal life ==
His son Mitchell is also a professional goalkeeper.
