= Robert Dickey =

Rob, Bob, or Robert Dickey may refer to:

- R. A. Dickey (Robert Allen Dickey, born 1974), baseball player
- Robert B. Dickey (1811–1903), Canadian politician
- Robert S. Dickey (1921–1991), American phytopathologist
- Robert J. Dickey (born c. 1957), American business executive
- Robert Dickey (American politician) (born 1953), American politician from Georgia
