= Lem Newcomb =

English footballer and manager

Personal information
- Full name: Leamon Robinson Newcomb
- Date of birth: 28 November 1903
- Place of birth: Stillington, County Durham, England
- Date of death: 3 July 1964 (aged 60)
- Height: 6 ft 0 in (1.83 m)
- Position: Right half

Senior career*
| Years | Team | Apps | (Gls) |
| – | Stillington Juniors | | |
| 1920–192? | Middlesbrough | 0 | (0) |
| – | Stockton Malleable Institute | | |
| 1926–192? | Darlington | 2 | (0) |
| – | Sittingbourne | | |
| 1928–1936 | Millwall | 187 | (2) |
| 1936–19?? | Southport (Note: Figure excludes three appearances in the abandoned 1939–40 Football League season, which Joyce's Football League Players' Records includes although most records do not.) | 79 | (1) |

Managerial career
- 1960–1964: Southport
- * Club domestic league appearances and goals

Leamon Robinson Newcomb (28 November 1903 – 3 July 1964), known as Lem Newcomb, was an English footballer who played as a right half in the Football League for Darlington, Millwall and Southport. He was on the books of Middlesbrough without playing League football for them, and also played non-league football for Stillington Juniors, Stockton Malleable Institute and Sittingbourne.

In 1960, he took over as manager of Southport. Ill-health forced his retirement in March 1964, and he died on 3rd July of that year.
