= Quebec Senior Hockey League =

Defunct Canadian ice hockey league

The Quebec Senior Hockey League (QSHL) was an ice hockey league that operated from 1941 to 1959, based in Quebec, Canada. The league played senior ice hockey under the jurisdiction of the Quebec Amateur Hockey Association until 1953, when it became professional and operated as the Quebec Hockey League (QHL).

== History ==
The origins of the Quebec Senior Hockey League (QSHL) rest with the Quebec Amateur Hockey Association (QAHA) which grew out of the Inter-Provincial Amateur Hockey Union which began play in Quebec from 1908. The bulk of the teams that formed the QSHL were part of the Montreal Senior Group of the QAHA. The QAHA re-organized its senior league for 1941 and the QSHL was formed.

=== 1940s ===
During the 1940–41 season, The Gazette reported rumours that QSHL players discussed strike action in protest of lower financial compensation given to players for their expenses, which was blamed the implementation of a reserve list system which prevented teams from competing for the same players. QAHA president Norman Dawe then arbitrated disputes where teams disagreed on player registrations, but the reserve list remained as a gentlemen's agreement among the teams. The QAHA wanted more influence into how the Canadian Amateur Hockey Association (CAHA) determined the dates and location of playoffs games for the Allan Cup, and objected to the 1941 Allan Cup playoffs beginning earlier than usual, which shortened the QSHL playoffs.

The QSHL proposed forming an Eastern Canada Hockey Association in May 1941. Under the proposal, the QAHA, the Ottawa and District Amateur Hockey Association (ODAHA), and the Maritime Amateur Hockey Association, would work together in the playoffs to determine one team to play against the Ontario champion; and share the profits from the gate receipts among themselves before the CAHA took its share. QSHL president George Slater felt that any team which reached the Allan Cup finals would face bankruptcy without a better financial deal, since the CAHA kept all profits from gate receipts in inter-branch playoffs. In the 1942 Allan Cup playoffs, the QAHA wanted the winners of the QSHL and the Eastern Townships League to play a series for the provincial senior championship. The CAHA denied the extension and the QSHL final was shortened to a two-game total-goals series. At the 1942 CAHA general meeting, the CAHA chose to increase travel expenses to teams during the playoffs instead of forming the Eastern Canada Hockey Association. The QAHA wanted to prevent stacked teams in the QSHL and other senior leagues, limited teams to signing a maximum of four former National Hockey League (NHL) players.

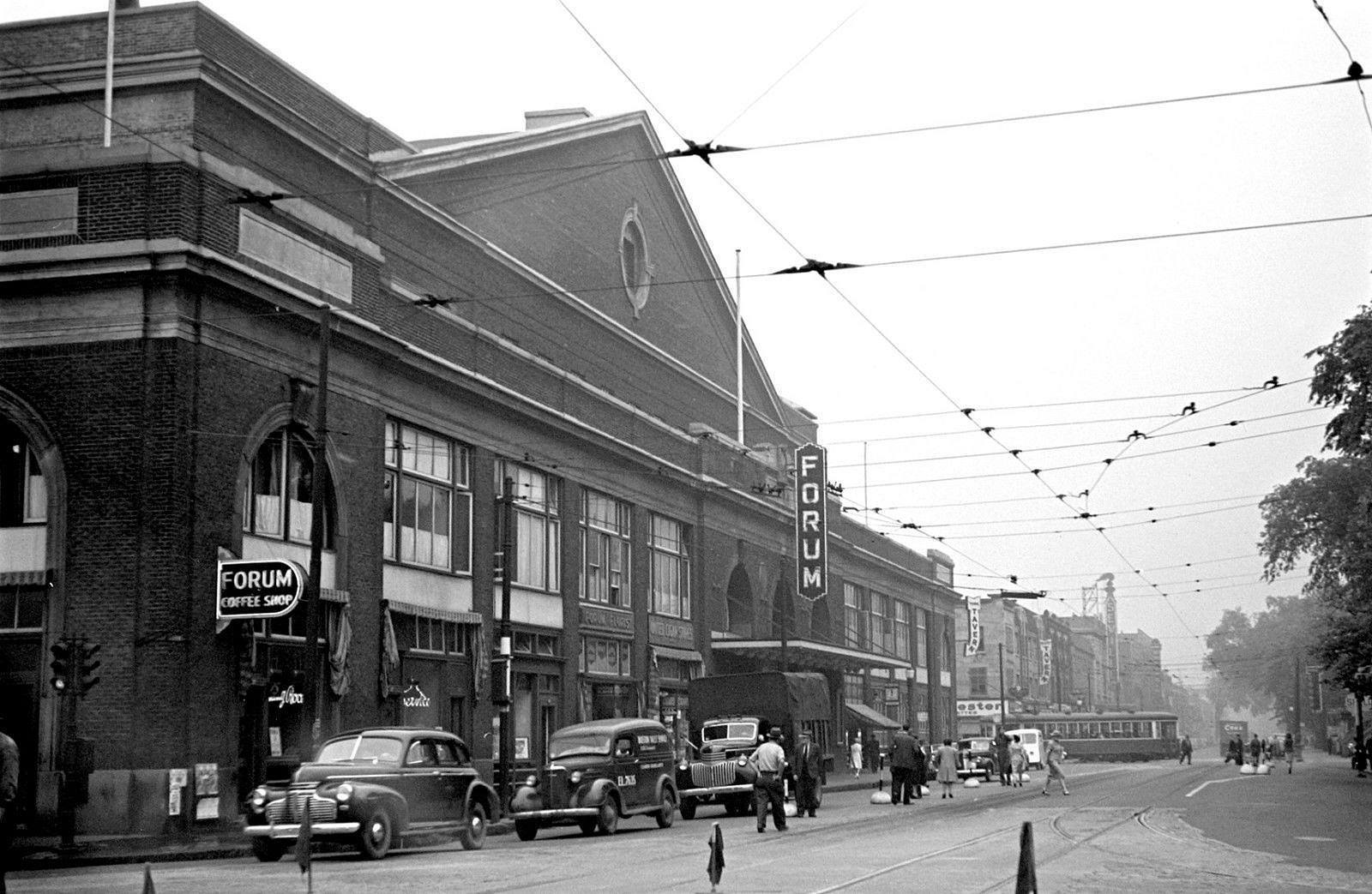
The Montreal Forum, c. 1945

1944–45 season, the ODAHA denied permission for the Ottawa Commandos and the Hull Volants to play in the QSHL, and wanted the teams to play in the Ottawa City Hockey League where it was in the association's best financial interest. The QSHL subsequently voted to operate the 1944–45 season with four teams independent of the QAHA and CAHA. Dawe remained willing to co-operate with the QSHL as long as a settlement could be reached with the ODAHA that allowed the teams to play under the jurisdiction of the QAHA. He attempted to mediate the dispute by allowing the ODAHA to keep the five per cent share of gate receipts for the Ottawa and Hull teams, instead of the funds being paid to the QAHA. CAHA secretary George Dudley mediated the dispute and decided that no players would be suspended while talks were ongoing. After a week of discussions, the ODAHA accepted Dawe's recommendation.

During the 1945–46 season, rumors persisted in The Gazette about the QSHL becoming a professional minor league, since teams were upset with the amount of travel expenses given by the CAHA in the Allan Cup playoffs. Dawe felt that senior teams had an obligation to support amateur hockey which was the source of senior players, and raised objections at the QSHL annual meeting. No decision was made on whether to become professional, and the league sought more information from the NHL on the benefits and finances of a professional minor league. The Winnipeg Free Press reported that the QSHL was the best senior hockey league in Canada, and that NHL executives resented that the Montreal Canadiens had the first pick of any player from the league. Dawe stated that Lester Patrick of the New York Rangers, and Art Ross of the Boston Bruins, wanted to see the QSHL and other CAHA senior leagues become professional for the best interests of the other NHL teams. The QSHL remained an amateur league for the 1945–46 season, which resulted in the QAHA being in its best financial position to date with the majority of income from QSHL gate receipts.

=== 1950s ===
The QSHL and other senior leagues requested a new deal with the CAHA and complained that their players were too costly to obtain and could easily leave since no contractual commitment was required. In 1950, the CAHA decided that its five best calibre senior leagues would compete for a new trophy at a higher level than the Allan Cup. The Alexander Cup became the championship trophy of the Major Series. The 1951 Valleyfield Braves and the 1952 Quebec Aces won the Alexander Cup.

The Ottawa Senators contested that according to the Major Series agreement, the handling of player eligibility questions and infractions of rules should be done by the CAHA instead of the QAHA. CAHA president W. B. George conducted discussions in December 1952, which resulted in recommended changes to the QSHL constitution and assertion of CAHA control over the Major Series.

In May 1953, the league decided to leave the CAHA by resigning from the QAHA, which was itself under suspension from the CAHA. After leaving the CAHA, the team owners voted to become professional to protect their player contracts. However, QSHL players who had signed forms with NHL clubs to play professionally, could not sign with the new QHL teams. The players who signed QHL contracts became QHL team property and their contracts could be sold or traded to NHL or other professional leagues.

The QHL disbanded following the 1958–59 season, with the Hull-Ottawa Canadiens, Montreal Royals and Trois-Rivières Lions going to the Eastern Professional Hockey League and the Quebec Aces heading to the American Hockey League.

== List of QSHL/QHL teams ==
The Allan Cup

Montreal Senior Group

- Lafontaine
- McGill University Redmen
- Montreal Junior Canadiens
- Montreal Royals (1933–41)
- Montreal Victorias (1908–1939)
- Ottawa Senators (1934–41)
- Quebec Aces (1936–41)
- Verdun

QSHL

- Boston Olympics (1947–49) ^{†}Played a split schedule between the QSHL and the EAHL
- Chicoutimi Sagueneens (1949–59)
- Cornwall, Ontario Flyers (1941–?)
- Hull Volants (1944–46)
- Hull-Ottawa Canadiens (1956–57) ^{†}Played a split schedule between the QSHL and the OHA Senior A league.
- Chicoutimi Sagueneens (1949–59)
- Montreal Royals (1941–59)
- Montreal Junior Canadiens (1941–)
- Montreal Pats (1941–42)
- New York Rovers (1947–49) ^{†}Played a split schedule between the QSHL and the EAHL
- Ottawa RCAF Flyers - (1942–1943)
- Ottawa Senators/Ottawa Commandos (1941–54)
- Quebec Aces (1941–59)
- Shawinigan Falls Cataracts (1945–53)
- Shawinigan Cataracts (1954–58)
- Sherbrooke St. Francis (1948–49)
- Sherbrooke Saints (1949–54)
- Springfield Indians (1953–54)
- Trois-Rivières Lions (1955–59)
- University of Montreal (1943–44)
- Valleyfield Braves (1945–55)

== List of league champions ==
Amateur QSHL: 1941–42 through 1952–53
Semi-professional QHL: 1953–54 through 1958–59

Season	Teams	Champion
1941–42	Cornwall Flyers, Montreal Canadiens, Montreal Pats, Montreal Royals, Ottawa Senators, Quebec Aces	Ottawa Senators(Season), Quebec Aces(Playoffs)
1942–43	Cornwall Flyers, Montreal Army, Montreal Canadiens, Montreal Royals, Ottawa Commandos, Ottawa RCAF Flyers, Quebec Aces	Ottawa Commandos
1943–44	Cornwall Army(withdrew), Montreal RCAF(withdrew), Montreal Royals, Ottawa Commandos, Quebec Aces, University of Montreal	Quebec Aces
1944–45	Hull Volants, Montreal Royals, Ottawa Commandos, Quebec Aces	Quebec Aces
1945–46	Hull Volants, Montreal Royals, Ottawa Senators, Quebec Aces, Shawinigan Cataracts, Valleyfield Braves	Montreal Royals
1946–47	Montreal Royals, Ottawa Senators, Quebec Aces, Shawinigan Cataracts, Valleyfield Braves	Montreal Royals
1947–48	Boston Olympics, Montreal Royals, New York Rovers, Ottawa Senators, Quebec Aces, Shawinigan Cataracts, Valleyfield Braves	Ottawa Senators
1948–49	Boston Olympics, Montreal Royals, New York Rovers, Ottawa Senators, Quebec Aces, Shawinigan Cataracts, Sherbrooke St. Francis, Valleyfield Braves	Ottawa Senators
1949–50	Chicoutimi Sagueneens, Montreal Royals, Ottawa Senators, Quebec Aces, Shawinigan Cataracts, Sherbrooke Saints, Valleyfield Braves	Sherbrooke Saints
1950–51	Chicoutimi Sagueneens, Montreal Royals, Ottawa Senators, Quebec Aces, Shawinigan Cataracts, Sherbrooke Saints, Valleyfield Braves	Valleyfield Braves
1951–52	Chicoutimi Sagueneens, Montreal Royals, Ottawa Senators, Quebec Aces, Shawinigan Cataracts, Sherbrooke Saints, Valleyfield Braves	Quebec Aces
1952–53	Chicoutimi Sagueneens, Montreal Royals, Ottawa Senators, Quebec Aces, Shawinigan Cataracts, Sherbrooke Saints, Valleyfield Braves	Chicoutimi Sagueneens
1953–54	Chicoutimi Sagueneens, Montreal Royals, Ottawa Senators, Quebec Aces, Sherbrooke Saints, Springfield Indians, Valleyfield Braves	Chicoutimi Sagueneens (Season), Quebec Aces (Playoffs)
1954–55	Chicoutimi Sagueneens, Montreal Royals, Ottawa Senators(withdrew), Quebec Aces, Shawinigan Cataracts, Valleyfield Braves	Shawinigan Cataracts (Season and Playoffs)
1955–56	Chicoutimi Sagueneens, Montreal Royals, Quebec Aces, Shawinigan Cataracts, Trois-Rivieres Lions	Shawinigan Cataracts (Season), Montreal Royals (Playoffs)
1956–57	Chicoutimi Sagueneens, Montreal Royals, Ottawa-Hull Jr. Canadiens, Quebec Aces, Shawinigan Cataracts, Trois-Rivieres Lions	Quebec Aces (Seasons and Playoffs)
1957–58	Chicoutimi Sagueneens, Montreal Royals, Quebec Aces, Shawinigan Cataracts, Trois-Rivieres Lions	Chicoutimi Sagueneens (Season), Shawinigan Cataracts (Playoffs)
1958–59	Chicoutimi Sagueneens, Montreal Royals, Quebec Aces, Trois-Rivieres Lions	Montreal Royals (Season and Playoffs)
