= Dicky =

Dicky, Dickey, Dickie, or plurals thereof may refer to:

== Clothing ==
- Dickey (garment), a type of false shirt-front
- Dickies, a brand of clothing

== People ==
- Dicky (name), a list of persons with the given name or nickname
- Dickey (name), a list of persons with the surname, nickname or given name
- Dickie (name), a list of persons with the nickname, surname or given name
- Dickie Valentine, stage name of English pop singer Richard Maxwell (1929-1971)

== Places ==
- Dickey, Georgia, an unincorporated community
- Dickey County, North Dakota
- Dickey, North Dakota, a city
- Dickey River, Washington state
- Dickey Glacier, Ross Dependency, Antarctica

== Other uses ==
- USS Dicky (SP-231), a boat
- The Dickies, a musical group
- Dickey's Barbecue Pit, an American restaurant chain
- Trunk (car), a storage space in a car, called a dickie or dicky in Southeast Asia

== See also ==
- Dicky, dickie, or dickey seat, a rumble seat in British English
- Dikki (disambiguation)
