= Chalo School =

School in British Columbia, Canada

Chalo School, owned and operated by the Fort Nelson First Nation, is located approximately 7 kilometres south of Fort Nelson, British Columbia, Canada. Opened in 1982 it started as an elementary school and has grown to providing preschool-4 to high school education. Chalo has independent school status with the BC Ministry of Education, and is part of School District 81 (Fort Nelson). It is open to all residents of the SD 81 catchment area. In 2006, Chalo School students and staff were on hand at the House of Commons in Ottawa as Chalo School was recognized "as a role model for B.C. and for the country."

Chalo School provides language lessons in Dene and Cree, starting in kindergarten. Cultural classes in art, living skills, and traditional practices are part of the curriculum. Chalo School works collaboratively with the Fort Nelson Secondary School (FNSS) to ensure integration of secondary school students into programs not offered at Chalo School. This innovative approach has seen overall improvements in test results for SD81, plus an increase in number of aboriginal students completing high school, and then continuing post-secondary studies. Chalo's student enrollment is approximately 200 First Nations and non-First Nation students. Chalo School students visit Ottawa 2006

The school is named after Harry Chalo Dickie, an elder of the FNFN who believed education empowered people and was important. Dickie worked closely with School District 81, including being the first member of the FNFN to be elected a School Trustee. The school was founded in 1982 by Susan (Sue) Gower and Carole Corcoran, nee Dickie, Harry's daughter. Corcoran was a member of the Citizen's Forum on National Unity (also known as the Spicer Commission), and the first member of the FNFN to achieve a Law Degree. Gower was the first principal of the school, and saw Chalo School grow and expand to become an important centre for learning, cultural activities, and community events for the FNFN. The school was initially a one-room schoolhouse in a temporary structure, but in 1996 a full building was constructed. The school facilities include a full-size gymnasium, fully equipped commercial kitchen, and an outdoor cultural campsite.
