= Fir Park =

Football stadium in Motherwell, Scotland

Fir Park Stadium
- Fir Park
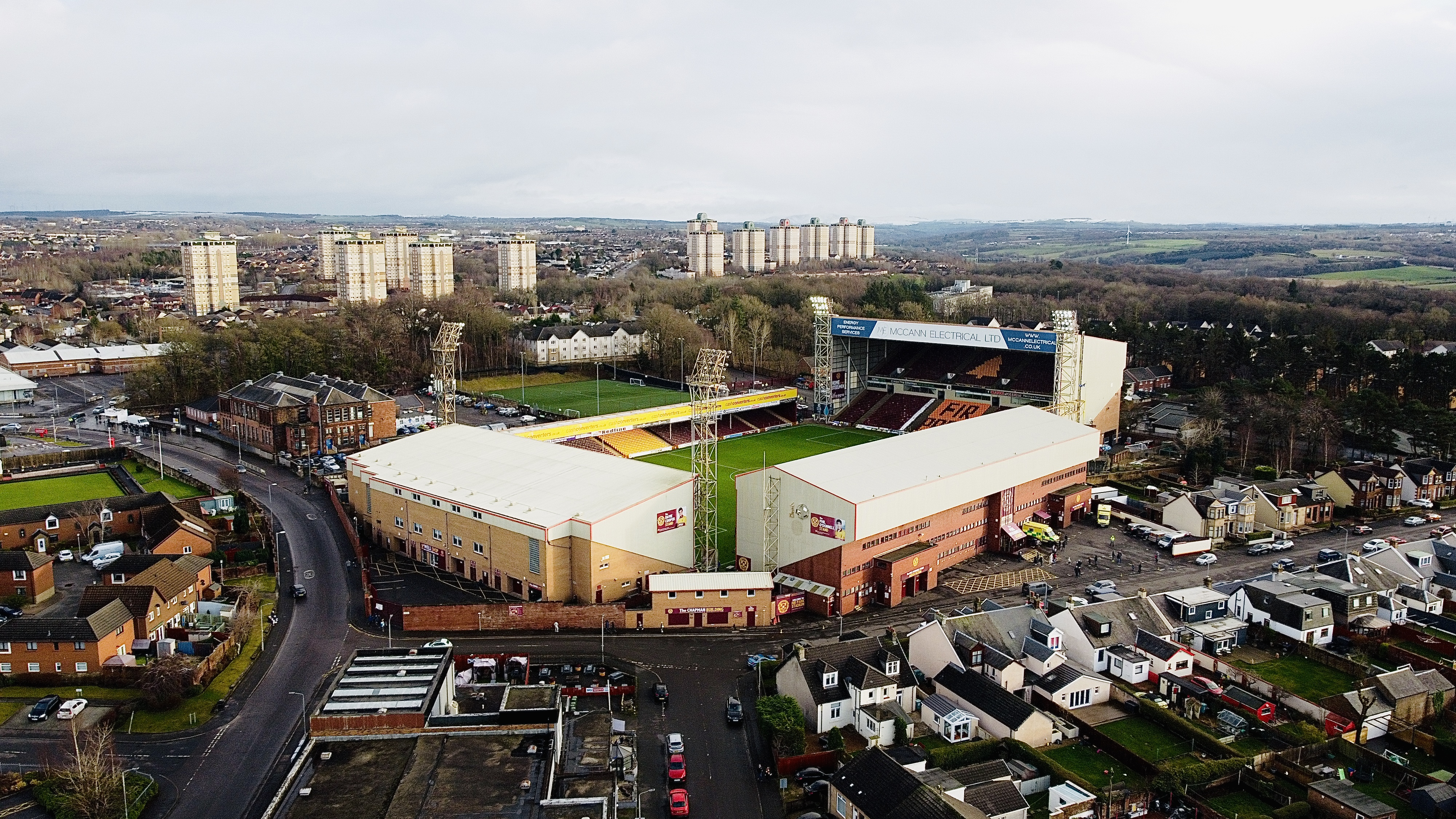

- Location in North Lanarkshire
- Location: Motherwell, North Lanarkshire
- Coordinates: 55°46′48″N 3°58′48″W
- Owner: Motherwell F.C.
- Capacity: 13,677
- Surface: Grass

Construction
- Opened: 1895
- Renovated: 1995 (Davie Cooper Stand)
- Architects: Bill Dickie (Davie Cooper Stand & Tommy McLean Stand)

Tenants
- Motherwell F.C. Gretna F.C.: 1896–present 2007–2008

Fir Park Stadium is a football stadium situated in Motherwell, North Lanarkshire, Scotland. The stadium plays host to the home matches of Scottish Premiership club Motherwell and was the temporary home of Gretna for the 2007–08 SPL season. Motherwell moved to the stadium in 1896, previously playing their football at Dalziel Park.

== History and facilities ==
Motherwell F.C. was formed in 1886. It played at sites on Roman Road and Dalziel Park until 1895, when Fir Park was opened. The ground was laid out in a wooded area belonging to Lord Hamilton of Dalzell, whose racing colours were claret and amber. Motherwell then adopted these colours themselves. Fir Park did not get off to a convincing start, with low attendances leading to rumours that Hibernian were ready to take over the stadium, something that didn't materialise.

The record attendance for the stadium is 35,632 against Rangers in a 1951–52 Scottish Cup replay (Motherwell went on to win the competition).

=== Stands ===
The stadium has an unbalanced look about it, with one large stand contrasting with three smaller structures, one of which does not extend the full length of the pitch. It has been an all-seater stadium since the 1990s, with a capacity of 13,677.

For most of the 20th century, Fir Park consisted of one main stand and a ring of terracing around the other three sides In 1977, Fir Park came within the terms of the Safety of Sports Grounds Act 1975. Only routine work was needed to keep the ground within the legislation, but it reduced capacity from 35,000 to 22,500 (including 3,500 seats in the Main Stand and two open terraces behind each goal). The Taylor Report in 1990 mandated that all top division clubs develop all-seater stadiums. At that time the community of Motherwell also had to overcome the economic challenges caused by the closure of the nearby Ravenscraig steelworks. The east side's covered enclosure was soon seated and within five years the open ends were demolished and new stands built.

==== Phil O'Donnell Main Stand ====
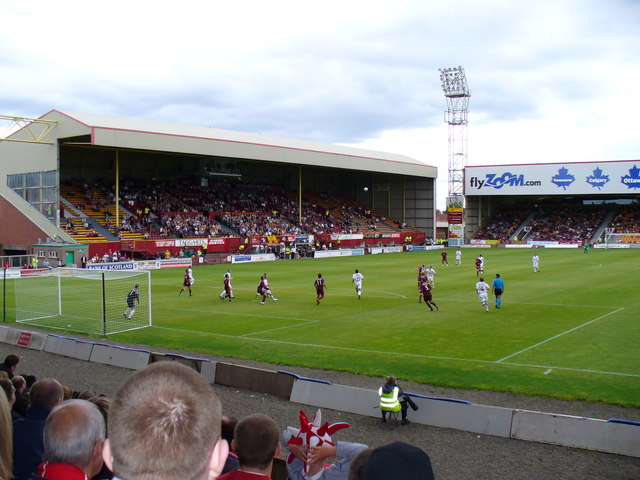
The Phil O'Donnell Stand is the main stand of Fir Park.

Construction of a new two tier main stand began in 1962. The £92,000 cost of this work was financed by a small quote and the selling of two players, Pat Quinn and Ian St John. To minimise disruption to the smaller old stand, the steel frame was built over and behind it. Construction of the stand stopped 20 yards short of the south end, however, because a local resident successfully objected to a full-length structure because it would have restricted light to the garden and reduced the value of the property. By the time the property owner had decided to sell, Motherwell did not have the funds or will to complete a full-length main stand, leaving a section of the frame intact but unused to this day. The club instead bought the house and used it for their offices.

During the construction of the new end stands in the 1990s, the main stand was re-clad and given a makeover to complement the modernised stadium, with windshields constructed at each end offering protection to fans. The stand has two hospitality suites, named The Centenary Suite and The Millennium Suite. It also has a roof-mounted gantry for television cameras, and press facilities. The Main Stand was renamed the Phil O'Donnell Stand in January 2008, to honour the Motherwell captain who died on the Fir Park pitch. A sculptured tribute to O'Donnell was added to the north wall of the stand in 2011.

==== John Hunter (east) Stand ====
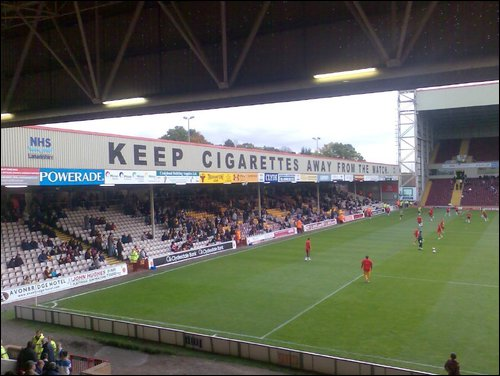
The John Hunter (east) Stand

The East Enclosure was formerly an area of open terracing, which was roofed in 1954 costing £6,500. Floodlight lamps were built on its roof and that of the main stand to host floodlit matches, and the first of these, against Preston North End, was played in 1956. The enclosure roof was damaged by strong winds, however, which meant that large corner floodlight pylons were built in 1959. To meet the Taylor Report requirements, it was converted to seating and re-cladded in the early 1990s, the £750,000 work financed partly by the club's Scottish Cup win in 1991. Although the East Enclosure is shallow, it allows sufficient legroom by only having seats on every second step. It houses the more vocal home support at Fir Park. The Scottish Health Council slogan "Keep cigarettes away from the match" adorned the roof for many years, but this was replaced by a Cash Converters advertisement in 2011. The Enclosure backs onto a concourse and then Knowetop Primary School.

In 2016, the East Enclosure was renamed in honour of John Hunter, manager of the club's only Scottish Football League title-winning team in 1931–32. This stand's roof suffered from leaks, eventually repaired in 2017. Further refurbishments, including the replacement of all seats, took place in early 2021, following the recent club record sale of David Turnbull, and with supporters unable to attend the stadium due to the COVID-19 pandemic in Scotland.

==== Tommy McLean (south) Stand ====
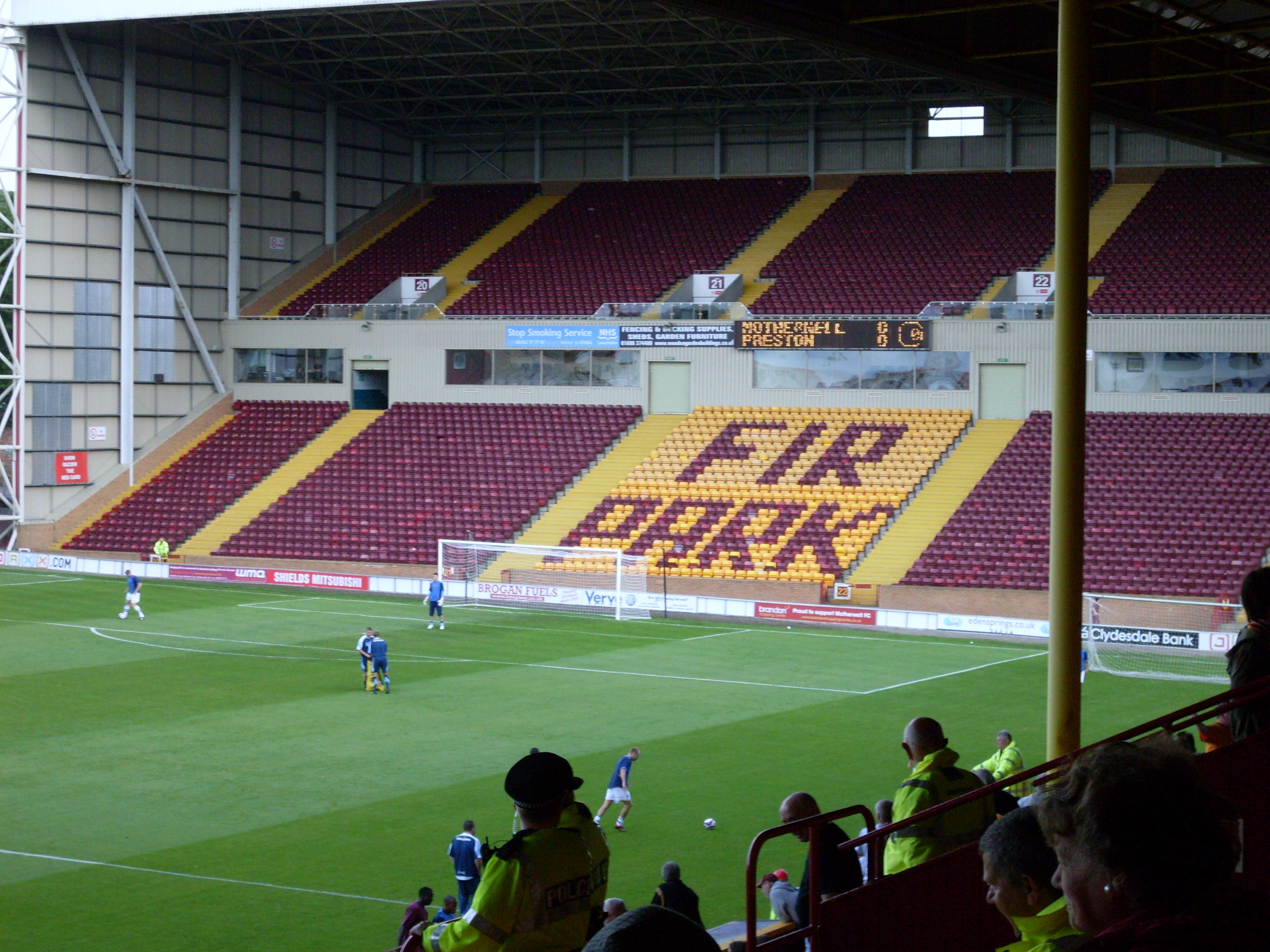
The Tommy McLean (south) Stand is normally used for away supporters and is the largest stand at the ground.

The South Stand is named after former manager Tommy McLean and was previously named the Maxim Office Park Stand for sponsorship reasons. The structure dominates the surrounding area, as it can be seen from all around Motherwell and the nearby M74 motorway. It is a two-tiered structure holding 4,856 fans and was opened on 26 April 1993 with a friendly match against Coventry City. The upper deck offers a panoramic view, beyond the centre of Motherwell to the distant Ochil Hills and Ben Lomond. It normally houses the away support. When the South Stand was first opened, Motherwell offered £20 debentures guaranteeing tickets for the games played by the relevant visiting team at Fir Park. This offer targeted supporters of the Old Firm clubs, with 600 debentures sold by late 1995, mostly to Rangers fans. Unusually for a stand designated for away fans, it has a row of corporate boxes running along between the two tiers. The South Stand also houses a gymnasium and warm up area.

The stand was renamed the Tommy McLean Stand in November 2021 after Tommy McLean, manager of Motherwell from 1984 to 1994 and winner of the 1991 Scottish Cup Final.

==== Davie Cooper (north) Stand ====
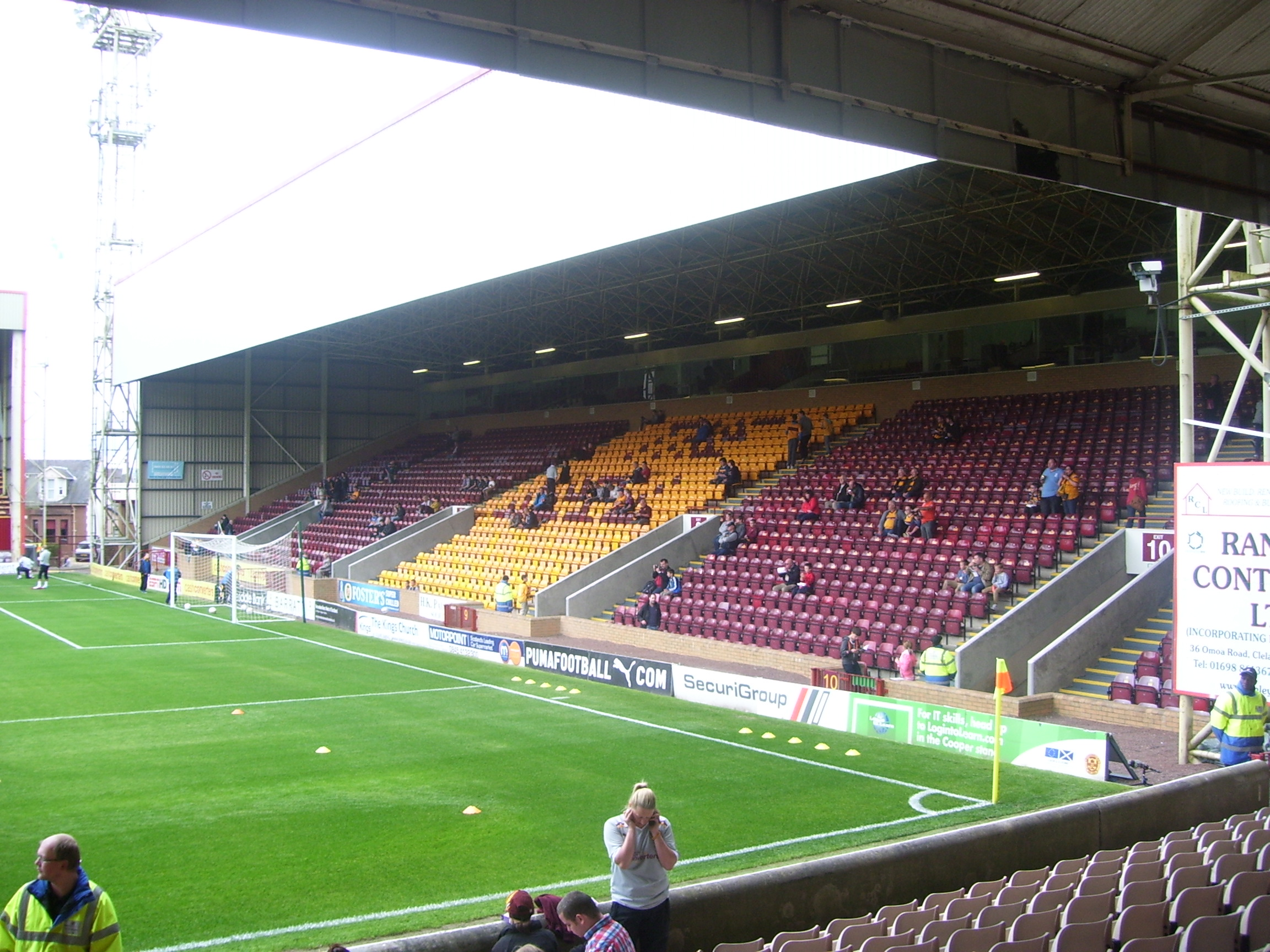
The Davie Cooper (north) Stand

The Davie Cooper Stand is of relatively similar design to the South Stand – both were designed by the company WH Dickie Architects, owned by Bill Dickie who was also a club director and SFA president – but only has one tier and a capacity of 2,373 seats. Motherwell were refused planning permission to construct a two tier structure, of similar design as the South Stand, at that end. This stand was officially opened on 6 May 1995, completing the stadium in its present format, and is dedicated to former player Davie Cooper who died in the year that it was opened. It houses the club shop, the Davie Cooper Suite, an IT department and hospitality boxes.

=== Pitch ===
The layout of the Fir Park pitch is unusual in that there is a slope of around 6 feet (1.8 m) from its east side down to the west side. This is perhaps most noticeable on the Davie Cooper Stand, where the east pitchside entry points are at ground level but those on the west side require a flight of steps; this can also be seen on the South Stand, but is not as obvious due to its larger size. The slope causes issues with drainage and turf quality, as does the shadow over the grass for most of each sunny day created by the looming South Stand. A less specific issue is the high levels of rainfall experienced in the west of Scotland. The pitch received negative publicity during the late 2000s for being sparsely-turfed in parts and frequently waterlogged, and several games were postponed. The pitch and the consequent fixture congestion forced Gretna, who were ground-sharing with Motherwell in the 2007–08 season, to play one of their league games at Almondvale Stadium in Livingston. In the 2008–09 season, a Motherwell game against Hearts was called off due to the pitch being frozen, which prompted media criticism as the required under-soil heating should have prevented this.

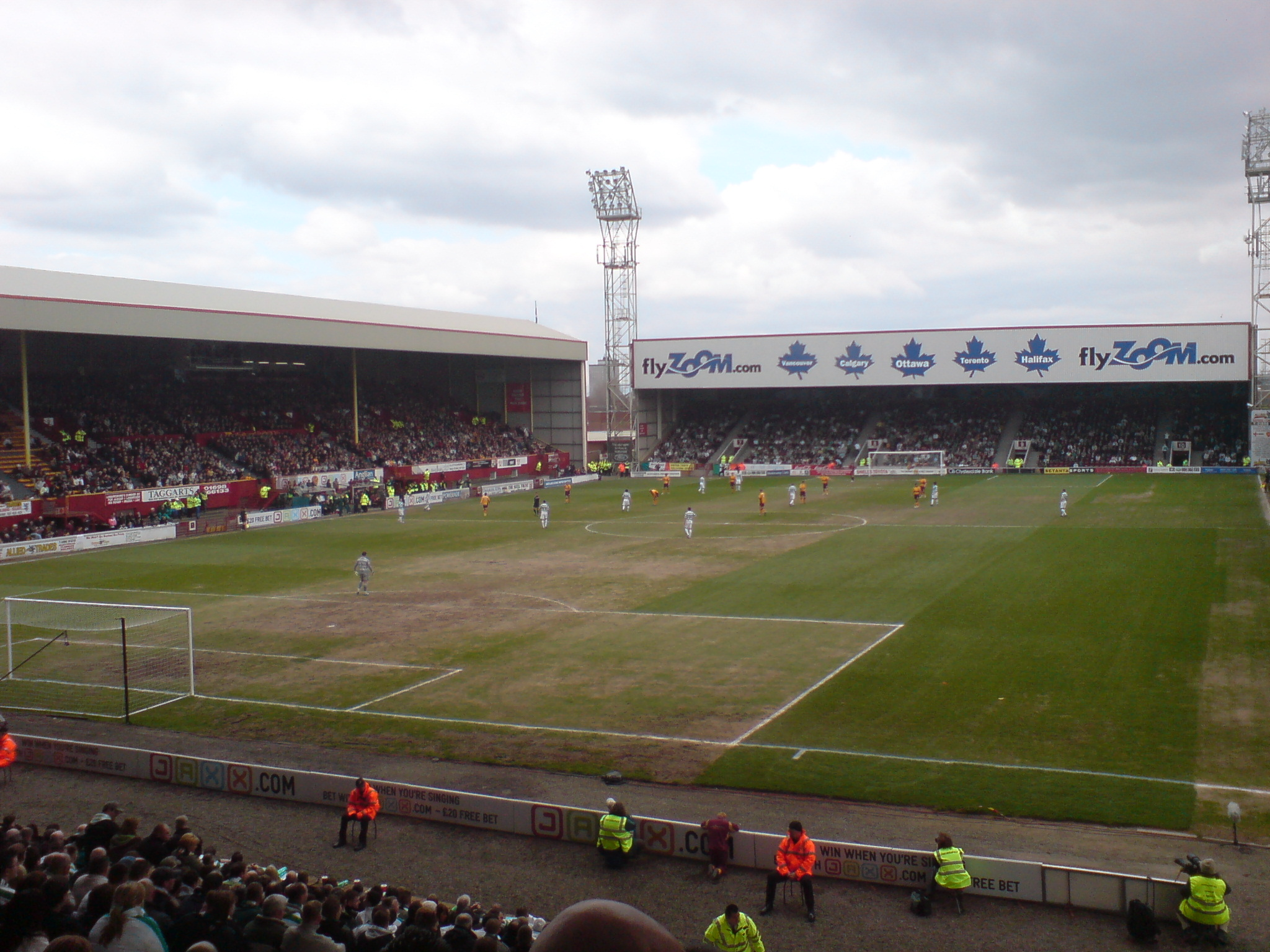
Fir Park in April 2008, when the pitch was in a bad condition.

The pitch underwent extensive remedial work, costing £350,000, in preparation for the 2009–10 Scottish Premier League season. There was a severe winter in 2009–10, however, which damaged the pitch greatly. The club tried to make the best of the situation by relaying both goal mouths. In season 2010–11, the club removed the top few inches of the pitch and completely relaid the pitch. They also added twisted sand fibre which should prevent the pitch from tearing as easily. On 2 December 2011, a match against Hibernian was abandoned at half-time due to a floodlight fire causing safety concerns.

In recent seasons, the pitch at Fir Park has been considered one of the best in the UK, winning the best pitch in the Scottish Premiership in the 2017–18 season. The drastic change in the playing surface came after considerable investment including the purchase of several lighting rigs to encourage turf growth, the cessation of all activities other than first team matches – preserving its condition and promoting an idea of grandeur and exclusivity among the youth squads hoping to play on it – and expert refurbishment led by head groundskeeper Paul Matthew who joined the club in 2014.

Between 2021 and 2022, Motherwell's board invested part of the income from the club's record sale of David Turnbull in the installment of a new hybrid surface, mainly made of grass and strengthened by synthetic fibers, at Fir Park, becoming the fourth club in Scotland (after Celtic, Rangers and Heart of Midlothian) to do so in the process.

== Other uses ==
During the 2007–08 season, Gretna rented Fir Park from Motherwell and played all but one of their home SPL games there. The now-defunct club also played their UEFA Cup tie against Derry City at the stadium in 2006. Over the years the stadium has played host to several Scottish Challenge Cup finals and hosted Scottish League Cup semi-finals in 2007 and 2010. Fir Park also hosted the opening ceremony of the 2011 International Children's Games, which were being held in Lanarkshire.

Fir Park was used as the home venue for the Scotland women's national football team during the 2015 FIFA Women's World Cup qualifying campaign.

== Future ==
At the 2008 annual general meeting, Motherwell announced plans to investigate the possibility of a redevelopment of Fir Park, or the possibility of a move to a new ground. Motherwell chairman John Boyle indicated at the following year's AGM that the club would not be leaving Fir Park within the next five to ten years. In June 2010, the club said that the repair of the pitch, which had come in for some fierce criticism in the latter part of the 2009–10 season, would be the last major investment at the stadium. In September 2011, vice-chairman Derek Weir indicated that the club are 'nowhere near' a ground move, insisting that the £15 million it would cost would be beyond their means.

In November 2019, with the club almost free of debt, chief executive Alan Burrows stated that the possibility of leaving Fir Park for a new ground "probably has to be a debate and a question that is put on the agenda quite high in the not too distant future" due to the age and standard of some of the facilities; however in early 2021, extensive refurbishments were carried out on the John Hunter Stand, with Burrows indicating work would also be carried out on the other stands.

== Transport ==
Motherwell railway station is approximately 15 minutes walking distance from Fir Park. Local trains on the Argyle Line serve Airbles railway station, which is closer to the ground. People travelling by car can use the M74 motorway, leaving at junction 6. The A723 and B754 (Airbles Road) roads lead to Fir Park. Alternatively, visitors from the east or north who come to Motherwell via Newhouse (junction 6 of the M8 motorway) should follow the A723 through Carfin to Motherwell and then take the A721 road to Fir Park. Car parking is available in the surrounding streets.

== See also ==
- Stadium relocations in Scottish football
