= George Dickey =

George Dickey may refer to:

- George Dickey (baseball) (1915–1976), Major League Baseball player
- George H. Dickey (1858–1923), American lawyer
- George Scott Dickey (1884–1953), farmer and political figure in Nova Scotia, Canada
- George E. Dickey (1840–1900), American architect

== See also ==
- George Dickie (disambiguation)
