= Glen Dickey =

American politician

Member of the New Hampshire House of Representatives
- In office 2016–2018
- Constituency: Hillsborough 5

Personal details
- Party: Republican

Glen Dickey is an American politician from New Hampshire. He served in the New Hampshire House of Representatives.
