= William Dickey =

William Dickey may refer to:

- Bill Dickey (1907–1993), catcher for the New York Yankees
- William Dickey (diver) (1874–1944), American diver
- William Dickey (poet) (1928–1994), American poet
- William Bruce Dickey (1842–1902), American businessman and politician
- William K. Dickey (1920–2008), American lawyer and politician
- William D. Dickey (1845–1924), American soldier and Medal of Honor recipient
- William A Dickey (circa 1896), American gold prospector and explorer

== See also ==
- Bill Dickie (disambiguation)
