= James Dickey (disambiguation) =

James Dickey (1923–1997) was an American poet and novelist.

James Dickey may also refer to:

- James Edward Dickey (1864–1928), American Methodist Episcopal bishop
- James Dickey (basketball, born 1954), American basketball coach
- James Dickey (basketball, born 1996), American basketball player
- Jim Dickey (1934–2018), American football coach
- James Dickey (United Irishmen) (1775/76–1798), Ulster Presbyterian barrister and member of the Society of the United Irishmen
- James Dickey (Texas politician) (born 1966), American politician
