= Gloria Dickie =

Canadian journalist and writer

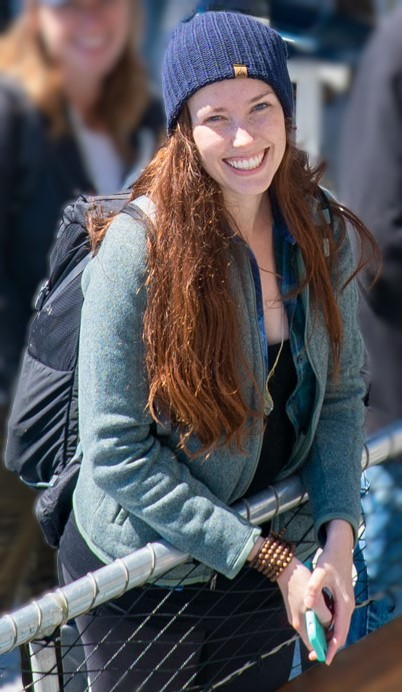
- Dickie in 2018 at the Oregon State University Marine Science Fellowship
- Born: London, Ontario
- Occupation: Journalist
- Years active: 2013-Present
- Notable work: Eight Bears

Gloria Dickie is a Canadian journalist who focuses on environmentalism, climate change, and the impact of environmental changes to local wildlife. Growing up in Ontario, Canada, she had an early interest in wildlife photography and went on to receive degrees in media and the environment, with her Master's thesis focusing on bears and their interactions with humans. Her interest in bears would continue as she reported on the Arctic and other environmental issues around the world as a freelance journalist before joining Reuters.

In 2023, she published the book Eight Bears that investigated the biological and cultural history of bear species around the world, including current academic research and environmental impacts on their livelihoods. She was nominated for multiple journalism awards for her reporting and received numerous fellowships and grants for her publications.

== Childhood and education ==
Dickie spent her childhood in London, Ontario, photographing local wildlife as she grew up, with a desire to be involved with larger animals that did not live in the region. She graduated with a bachelor's degree from the University of Western Ontario in 2012 in the media, information and technoculture program. She went on to earn a master's degree from the University of Colorado Boulder. Her master's thesis was on the topic of black bears and their encounters with humans in neighborhoods in the area of the American West, which she researched by traveling to Lake Tahoe and surrounding cities. She looked into how each city had set up its garbage bylaws to minimize the risk of bears traveling to inhabited areas to consume thrown out food. Her interest in the subject came about after she learned about the Bearsitters volunteer group in Boulder, Colorado, that acts to make sure any bears inside the city limits are encouraged to leave without being harmed.

== Career ==
Beginning her journalism work while still in university, Dickie acted as a reporter for her university's newspaper, the Western Gazette. She would eventually become editor-in-chief of the paper. After graduating with her higher degree, she wanted to learn more about bear species around the world and became a freelance foreign correspondent while traveling before being hired by Reuters as an official environmental journalist. During the 2020 COVID-19 pandemic, many news outlets stopped hiring freelance journalists and those that continued hiring wanted only articles about the pandemic. For her work, Dickie decided to write international articles about how the pandemic has been affecting zoos, tourism, and non-human animals at risk of infection.

In July 2023, she published the book Eight Bears: Mythic Past and Imperiled Future, which covers the scientists who research bears, the culture and history surrounding bears in different countries, and the risks that climate change has for their ongoing existence. To obtain the material for the book, Dickie traveled to different global regions associated with each bear species: first to South America for spectacled bears, then India for sloth bears, China for panda bears, and Vietnam for sun bears and Asian black bears. She then traveled back to North America and the United States for both American black bears and brown bears, before finishing in her country of origin, Canada, for polar bears. The book was selected by Scientific American as one of the 55 best books of 2023 and by Men's Journal as one of the best 25 books of 2023.

== Organizations ==
As a member of the Society of Environmental Journalists (SEJ), Dickie served as a board member from 2016 to 2019.

== Awards and honors ==
For her article on new methods being used to farm maggots as livestock feed, Dickie was selected as a winner of the 2017 Food Sustainability Media Awards. After publishing a short piece of feature writing for enRoute titled "Adventures in Panda Land", she was nominated for the 2019 National Magazine Awards. For her reporting on the Arctic and environmental conditions there in 2021, she was made a finalist for the Breaking News category in the Covering Climate Now awards. She was also given a First Honorable Mention in the SEJ's Awards for Reporting on the Environment for her reporting. For the international reporting group, she was a finalist in the 2022 Livingston Awards.

Her book Eight Bears was chosen as a finalist in the environmental literature category for the 2023 Banff Mountain Book Awards.

=== Fellowships and grants ===
For the 2016 UAF Arctic Journalism Fellowship from the University of Alaska Fairbanks, Dickie was chosen as a fellow and attended the 2016 Arctic Science Summit to meet with Arctic researchers and policymakers in order to write about their work and travel to their research sites. She was named a 2018 National Geographic Explorer by the National Geographic Society and given a grant for her work. The same year, she was chosen as one of twelve international journalists to be recognized as a marine science media fellow by Oregon State University. In 2021, she was awarded a micro-grant from the Overseas Press Club to fund her reporting during the COVID-19 pandemic. She was one of the ten 2022 Thomas Lovejoy Memorial Press Fellows selected from international journalists by the United Nations Foundation to allow them to travel to the research outpost in Manaus, Brazil, in order to report on the environmental work done there.

== Bibliography ==
- — (July 2023). Eight Bears: Mythic Past and Imperiled Future. W. W. Norton & Company. p. 272. ISBN 9781324005094.
