= Justice Dickey =

Justice Dickey may refer to:

- Betty Dickey (born 1940), associate justice of the Arkansas Supreme Court
- Jay Dickey (1939–2017), special justice for a case before the Arkansas Supreme Court
- Theophilus Lyle Dickey (1811–1885), associate justice of the Illinois Supreme Court

== See also ==
- Justice Dickie, character in the 2014 Irish film Mrs. Brown's Boys D'Movie
