= Helen Dickie =

American physician

Dr. Helen Dickie (1913–1988) was a nationally renowned pulmonologist.

She was born in rural Wisconsin and received her B.A. (1935) and medical degree (1937) from the University of Wisconsin–Madison, graduating first in her medical school class. After getting her post-graduate training from the Los Angeles County Hospital and Wisconsin general hospitals, she returned to the University of Wisconsin-Madison and joined the faculty in 1943 where she spent her career; she was made head of the Pulmonary Section in 1973 and served in that role until she retired in 1983.

During her career at Wisconsin she noticed that a high level of students were falling victim to tuberculosis. As a result, she became a leader in preventing, diagnosing, and treating the disease on campus, leading to the virtual elimination of tuberculosis at the university. She went on to do the same for farmers in the state of Wisconsin. She also did key studies on Farmer's lung.

Her work garnered her several awards and titles. She was named Master of the American College of Physicians in 1974, and in 1983 was the first woman to receive the University of Wisconsin–Madison Alumni Citation. In 1986, she was named to the Senior Council of the American Lung Association, and was the President of the Wisconsin Thoracic Society and the Mississippi Thoracic Society.

She was considered a "giant in Wisconsin medicine" and advocated for women in medicine. In honor of her work, the Wisconsin Chapter of the American College of Physicians created an award named after her, the "Helen Dickie Woman of the Year".
