= Harry Chalo Dickie =

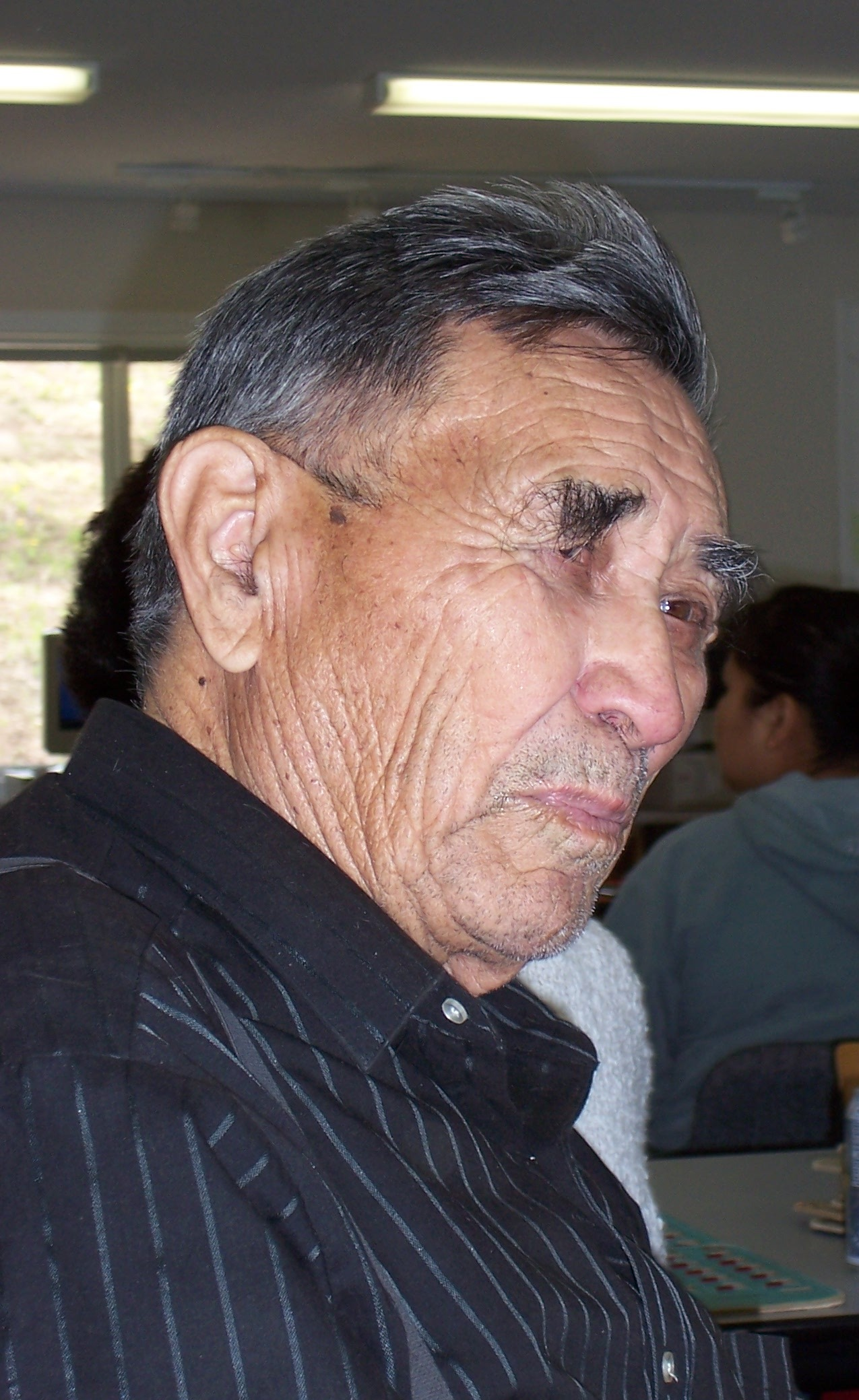
Harry Chalo Dickie, May 20, 2005

Harry Chalo Dickie (1913–2008) was a member of the Fort Nelson First Nation (originally the Fort Nelson Slavey Band, or Fort Nelson Indian Band) and was first elected to the Band Council in the 1950s. Dickie was elected Chief in 1970, and was instrumental in the Band negotiating a Mineral Rights Sharing Agreement with the Federal Government of Canada and the Province of British Columbia in 1980.

== Career ==
Dickie was a member of the Union of BC Indian Chiefs, a Fort Nelson School District 81 Trustee (the first member of the Nation to be elected to the board), and a founding member of the Fort Nelson Friendship Society. During his term as Chief of his community, Dickie made national and international news when he blocked the arrival of the first BC Rail train in 1971 in a dispute over railway access across Reserve land.

== Legacy ==
Chalo School and Chalo Road, located on the Fort Nelson First Nation, is named after Dickie.
