= Montreal Pats =

- City: Montreal, Quebec
- League: QSHL, JAHA
- Founded: 1941

The Montreal Pats were both a senior and junior ice hockey team in Montreal, Quebec.

The two teams were formed in the fall of 1941 and folded at the end of the season in spring 1942. Due to World War II the teams had difficulty in securing players.

The intention was to be the first ice hockey teams to represent the city's Irish community since the Montreal Shamrocks folded in 1912. The Montreal Pats entered teams in both the Quebec Senior Hockey League and the Junior Amateur Hockey Association; the senior team replaced the Montreal Concordia Civics.

The senior team finished sixth and last. The junior team finished fourth and last. Due to the difficulties of World War II the team was abolished in 1942.
