= Peter Laraman =

English footballer

Personal information
- Full name: Peter Kenneth Laraman
- Date of birth: 24 October 1940
- Place of birth: Rochester, Medway, England
- Date of death: 28 April 2020 (aged 79)
- Position: Inside forward

Senior career*
| Years | Team | Apps | (Gls) |
| 1958–1960 | Charlton Athletic | 2 | (1) |
| 1961–1962 | Torquay United | 9 | (5) |
| 1962–1963 | Canterbury City | 8 | (1) |
| 1962–1964 | Durban City | | |
| 1965–1966 | Slavia Melbourne | 39 | (27) |
| 1967–1968 | Pan Hellenic | | |
| 1970 | South Melbourne Hellas | 0 | (0) |
- * Club domestic league appearances and goals

Peter Kenneth Laraman (October 24, 1940 - April 28, 2020)) was an English footballer who played as an inside forward in the Football League. He represented England at youth level.
