= John Dickey =

John Dickey may refer to:

- John Dickey (U.S. politician), member of the U.S. House of Representatives from Pennsylvania
- John Dickey (Canadian politician), member of the Canadian House of Commons
- John Miller Dickey, Presbyterian minister and college president
- John Sloan Dickey, American diplomat and scholar
