= John Dickie (evangelist) =

Scottish evangelist

John Dickie (January 1823, at Irvine, Ayrshire – 18 January 1891, also at Irvine) was a Scottish evangelist and writer.

== Life ==
His father (a grocer) died when John was 15; his mother had died 4 years before. He and one sister were left orphans. In 1841 he entered the University of Glasgow, and between 19 and 20 years of age “he was led to accept the Lord Jesus Christ as his all-sufficient Saviour”.

After finishing his university career he entered the Divinity Hall, but became ill with pulmonary consumption and went back to Irvine to carry on the grocery business with his sister. In 1848 he was told by a London doctor that he would not survive 12 months. He went home and stayed with his brother-in-law for four or five years, when he moved to Cairnryan to teach in the Free Church school, but with his health failing again he returned to Irvine.

After a while he became a missionary in his native town, supported by John Watt, merchant, a godly Baptist.

In 1858 he moved to Kilmarnock at the invitation of John Stewart and continued his evangelism there. At Kilmarnock he met John Todd (later in Dublin), to whom he later wrote many letters which were published in two books. Stewart and Dickie were involved in an Open Brethren assembly, where he preached regularly.

He wrote a number of tracts (Religious Tract Society and Drummond's) with large circulation; contributed to periodicals including the Family Treasury; and wrote many poems and hymns.

In 1878 he returned from Kilmarnock to Irvine because of further ill-health, where he was cared for by his sister and her husband, Provost Watt, and their family. After his death in 1891, he was buried in Irvine Churchyard.

== Published Writings ==
- Words of Faith, Hope and Love, from the Chamber of a Dying Saint (London, 1891).
- More Words of Faith, Hope, and Love (London, 1897). These two consist of letters written to John Todd from 1883 onwards.
- Unsearchable Riches, being meditations and letters from the chamber of a suffering saint (Kilmarnock, 1900).
