= Bill Dickie (footballer) =

Scottish footballer

Personal information
- Full name: William Cunningham Dickie
- Date of birth: 2 May 1893
- Place of birth: Kilmarnock, Scotland
- Date of death: 1960 (aged 67)
- Height: 5 ft 8 in (1.73 m)
- Position: Half back

Senior career*
Years	Team	Apps	(Gls)
1909–1910	Riccarton		
1910–1912	Kilbirnie Ladeside		
1912–1918	Kilmarnock	87	(15)
1919–1921	Chelsea	35	(0)
1920–1921	Stoke	14	(0)
1922–1928	Sittingbourne		
1929	Sheppey United		
Total		136	(15)
- * Club domestic league appearances and goals

William Cunningham Dickie (2 May 1893 – 1960) was a Scottish footballer who played in the Football League for Chelsea and Stoke.

== Career ==
Dickie began his career for his hometown club of Kilmarnock and after World War I he joined English side Chelsea. He spent two seasons with the Blues, making 40 appearances, before joining Stoke in May 1920. He played 14 matches for Stoke, helping the club gain promotion to the First Division in 1921–22. However, he was deemed surplus to requirements and he left for non-league Sittingbourne.

== Career statistics ==
Club	Season	League			FA Cup		Total	
Club	Season	Division	Apps	Goals	Apps	Goals	Apps	Goals
Chelsea	1919–20	First Division	28	0	2	0	30	0
Chelsea	1920–21	First Division	7	0	3	0	10	0
Chelsea	Total		35	0	5	0	40	0
Stoke	1920–21	Second Division	2	0	0	0	2	0
Stoke	1921–22	Second Division	12	0	0	0	12	0
Stoke	Total		14	0	0	0	14	0
Career Total			49	0	5	0	54	0
