= 1941 Allan Cup =

Canadian senior ice hockey championship

The Allan Cup trophy

The 1941 Allan Cup was the Canadian senior ice hockey championship for the 1940–41 season.

== Final ==
Best of 5

- Sydney 8 Regina 6
- Sydney 6 Regina 3
- Sydney 1 Regina 1
- Regina 5 Sydney 4
- Regina 3 Sydney 2
- Regina 3 Sydney 0

Regina Rangers beat Sydney Millionaires 3-2, 1 tie, on series.
