= Robert J. Dickey =

- Born: c. 1957
- Occupation: Businessman
- Known for: CEO of the Gannett Company

Robert J. Dickey (born c. 1957) is an American business executive. He served as the chief executive officer of the Gannett Company, a publisher of 85 newspapers including USA Today, from 2015 to 2019.

== Early life ==
Dickey was born circa 1957.

== Career ==
Dickey first worked for the Ashland Daily Tidings in 1981.

Dickey began working for the Gannett Company since 1989, first at the Reno Gazette-Journal, then at The Desert Sun in 1993. He was appointed group vice president in 1997 and senior group president of the Pacific Group in 2005. He served as the chief executive officer of the Gannett Company from 2015 to 2019. Upon his retirement on May 7, 2019, he was succeeded by interim chief operating officer and chief legal officer Barbara Wall.

Dickey earned $8.7 million in 2017.
