= John Dickie (theologian) =

Scottish-New Zealand presbyterian theologian (1875–1942)

John Dickie (20 May 1875 – 24 June 1942) was a Scottish-New Zealand presbyterian theologian and professor.

== Life ==
He was born in Aberdeen, Scotland on 20 May 1875.

After growing up in the Buchan District of North East Scotland, Dickie attended University in Aberdeen in 1891, graduating with an MA (honours) in classics. He taught at public schools for two years after graduating, before beginning theological studies at the University of Edinburgh, a decision that was influenced by Professor Flint. He won many scholarships and prizes every year during his studying, and worked as an assistant to many parishes throughout England.

In 1909, Dickie accepted the position as the Chair of Systematic Theology and New Testament in New Zealand, and he moved to Dunedin with his wife Barbara Trotter. Dickie's notable works include The Organism of Christian Truth, which was a set text in Scotland into the 1950s.
