= Dicky (name) =

Dicky is an Indonesian surname name and also given name or a nickname, often of Richard, sometimes of William.

== Given name ==
Note: It is assumed that Dicky is the first name of those in this section, as their articles do not state otherwise.

- Dicky Cheung (born 1965), Hong Kong television actor and singer
- Dicky Firasat (born 1981), Indonesian footballer
- Dicky Gonzalez (born 1978), Puerto Rican baseball pitcher
- Dicky Moore (born 1978), English songwriter
- Dicky Palyama (born 1978), badminton player
- Dicky Rutnagur (1931–2013), Indian sports journalist
- Dicky Thompson (born 1957), American professional golfer

== Nickname ==
=== Richard ===
- Dicky Barrett (born 1964), American rock singer
- Dicky Barrett (trader) (1807–1847), one of the first white traders to be based in New Zealand
- Richard "Dicky" J. Bolles (1843–1917), American salesman, one of the first to sell land in Florida, sight unseen, to non-residents
- Dicky Bond (1883–1955), English footballer
- Dicky Dorsett (1919–1999), English footballer
- Dicky Eklund (born 1958), American retired welterweight boxer
- Dicky Merritt (1897–1978), English footballer
- Dicky Moegle (1934–2021), American National Football League player
- Dicky Owen (1876–1932), Welsh rugby union player
- Dicky Pride (born 1969), American professional golfer
- Dicky Robinson (1927–2009), English footballer
- Richard "Dicky" Suett (1755–1805), English comedian and stage actor, King George III's favourite Shakespearean clown

=== William ===
- Dicky Richards (1862–1903), South African cricketer
- Dicky Wells (1907–1985), American jazz trombonist

=== Other ===
- Dicky Case (1910–1980), Australian international speedway rider
- Dicky Ralph (1908–1989), Welsh rugby union and rugby league player
- Lil Dicky (born 1988), rapper

== See also ==
- Dickey (name)
- Dickie (name)
