= Bill Dickie (football administrator) =

Scottish football executive (1929–2012)

William Holmes Dickie (30 May 1929 – 9 January 2012) was the President of the Scottish Football Association from season 1993–94 to 1996–97.

Dickie also served as a director for Motherwell FC for over 30 years, including a spell as club chairman between 2003 and 2008.

== Architect work ==
Bill Dickie was also an architect, who was responsible in the early 1990s for the redesign of the North(Davie Cooper Stand) and South Stands at Motherwell FC's Fir Park stadium.
