= Bendt =

Bendt is a surname and a male given name. As a German surname, it may be a contraction of Bernhard. Notable people with the name include:

- Bendt Bendtsen, Danish politician
- Bendt Jørgensen (1924-2000), Danish footballer
- Bendt Rothe, Danish actor
- Oliver Bendt, German singer and actor

== See also ==
- Bendt, Bent, Bentt, Benet, Benett, Benetti, Bennet, Bennette, Bennetto, Bennetts, Bennett
- Barend, Barends, Barnard, Behrendt, Bendt, Bent, Berend, Berent Berendt, Behrent, Bernard, Bernhard, Bernhardt, Bernd, Bernt, Berndt
- Benard, Bénard, Besnard, Berardi, Bernardi, Bernardin, Bernardini, Bernardino, Bernardo, Bernardoni, Bernardy
- Template:Bear-surname
