= Bernardino =

Bernardino is a name of Italian, Hispanic, or Portuguese origin. Notable people with the name include:

== Given name ==
- Bernardino of Fossa (1420–1503), Italian Franciscan historian and ascetical writer
- Bernardino of Siena (1380–1444), Italian priest, Franciscan missionary, and Catholic saint
- Bernardino de Anaya (fl. mid-16th century), Spanish man who founded the city of Chachapoyas, Peru
- Bernardino Baldi (1533–1617), Italian mathematician and writer
- Bernardino Bertolotti (1547-after 1609), Italian composer and instrumentalist
- Bernardino Bilbao Rioja (1895–1983), Bolivian air force officer
- Bernardino Blaceo (died 1570), Italian painter of the Renaissance period
- Bernardino Borlasca (1580–1631), Italian composer of the Renaissance era
- Bernardino Butinone (a.k.a. Bernardo da Treviglio, c. 1436 – c. 1508), Italian painter of the Renaissance
- Bernardino Caballero (1839–1912), President of Paraguay 1881–1886
- Bernardino Cametti (1669–1736), Italian sculptor of the late Baroque period
- Bernardino Campi (1522–1591), Italian Renaissance painter from Reggio Emilia
- Bernardino Campilius (fl. 1502), Italian painter
- Bernardino Capitelli (1589–1639), Italian painter and etcher of the Baroque period
- Bernardino Carboni (died after 1779), Italian decorator and wood sculptor of the Baroque period
- Bernardino Cesari (1565–1621), Italian painter of the late-Mannerist and early Baroque period
- Bernardino Ciceri (born 1650), Italian painter of the Baroque period
- Bernardino Drovetti (1776–1852), Italian diplomat, lawyer, explorer, and antiquarian
- Bernardino Echeverría Ruiz (1912–2000), Ecuadoran Roman Catholic cardinal
- Bernardino Fabbian (1950–2023), Italian football player
- Bernardino Fungai (1460–1516), Italian painter
- Bernardino Gagliardi (1609–1660), Italian painter of the Baroque period
- Bernardino Gatti (died 1576), Italian painter of the Renaissance
- Bernardino Genga (1620–1690), Italian scholar of classical medical texts
- Bernardino Halbherr (1844–1934), Italian entomologist
- Bernardino Herrera (born 1977), Spanish field hockey player
- Bernardino India (1528–1590), Italian painter of the late Renaissance
- Bernardino José de Campos Júnior (1841–1915), Brazilian politician, second and sixth governor of the State of São Paulo
- Bernardino Lanini (1511–1578), Italian painter of the Renaissance period
- Bernardino Licinio (1489–1565), Italian High Renaissance painter of Venice and Lombardy
- Bernardino López de Carvajal (1455–1523), Spanish cardinal of the Roman Catholic Church
- Bernardino Ludovisi (1693–1749), Italian sculptor
- Bernardino Luini (died 1532), Italian painter from Leonardo's circle
- Bernardino Machado (1851–1944), Portuguese politician, President of Portugal 1915–17 and 1925–26
- Bernardino Maffei (1514–1549), Italian archbishop and cardinal
- Bernardino de Mendoza (1540–1604), Spanish military commander, diplomat, and writer
- Bernardino de Mendoza (Captain General) (1501–1557), Captain General of the Spanish galleys
- Bernardino Mezzastris (fl. early 16th century), Italian painter of the Umbrian school
- Bernardino Molinari (1880–1952), Italian orchestra conductor
- Bernardino Nogara (1870–1958), Italian financial manager, financial advisor to the Vatican 1929–1954
- Bernardino Parasole (fl. 17th century), Italian painter of the Baroque period
- Bernardino Pedroto (born 1953), Portuguese football player and manager
- Bernardino Piñera (1915–2020), Chilean prelate of the Roman Catholic Church
- Bernardino Poccetti (1548–1612), Italian Mannerist painter and printmaker
- Bernardino da Polenta (lord of Cervia, died 1313), lord of Cervia, Emilia-Romagna 1297–1313
- Bernardino I da Polenta (died 1359), lord of Ravenna and Cervia 1346–1359
- Bernardino II da Polenta (fl. died 1400), lord of Ravenna, Italy 1389–1400
- Bernardino Radi (c. 16th century), Italian engraver and architect
- Bernardino Ramazzini (1633–1714), Italian physician
- Bernardino Realino (1530–1616), Italian Jesuit priest; canonized in 1947
- Bernardino de Rebolledo (1597–1676), Spanish poet, soldier, and diplomat
- Bernardino Rivadavia (1780–1845), first president of Argentina 1826–1827
- Bernardino de Sahagún (1499–1590), Spanish Franciscan missionary to the Aztec (Nahua) people of Mexico, compiler of the Florentine Codex
- Bernardino de Sousa Monteiro (1865–1930), Brazilian politician, governor of Espirito Santo 1916–20
- Bernardino Spada (1594–1661), Italian cardinal of the Roman Catholic Church and art patron
- Bernardino Tamames Alonso (born 1973), Spanish basketball player
- Bernardino Telesio (1509–1588), Italian philosopher and natural scientist
- Bernardino Varisco (1850–1933), Italian philosopher and a professor of theoretical philosophy
- Bernardino Fernández de Velasco, 1st Duke of Frías (1450–1512), Spanish nobleman and military figure during the Reconquista
- Bernardino Fernández de Velasco, 6th Duke of Frías (1610–1652), Spanish nobleman and diplomat
- Bernardino Fernández de Velasco, 14th Duke of Frías (1753–1851), Spanish nobleman, politician, and diplomat
- Bernardino Vitulini (fl. 1350), Italian painter
- Bernardino Zacchetti (fl. c. 1523), Italian painter of the Renaissance period
- Bernardino Zapponi (1927–2000), Italian novelist and screenwriter; collaborated with Federico Fellini

== Surname ==
- Afril Bernardino (born 1996), Filipino basketball player
- Ana Bernardino (contemporary), Brazilian pop singer
- Angélico Sândalo Bernardino (1933–2025), Brazilian Roman Catholic bishop of Blumenau
- Brennan Bernardino (born 1992), American baseball player
- Firmino Bernardino (born 1950), Portuguese cyclist
- Gabriel Bernardino (born 1964), Portuguese mathematician
- Girolamo di Bernardino (fl. 1511–1518), Italian painter of the Renaissance period
- Hereiti Bernardino (born 1993), French Polynesian track and field sprinter
- Juan Bernardino (1460–1544), one of two Aztec peasants alleged to have had visions of the Virgin Mary as Our Lady of Guadalupe in 1531
- Jun Bernardino (1947–2007), commissioner of the Philippine Basketball Association 1993–2002
- Pietro Bernardino (1475–1502), follower of Savonarola

== See also ==
- San Bernardino (disambiguation)
- Bernardina
- Barend, Barends, Barnard, Behrendt, Berend, Berent Berendt, Behrent, Bernard, Bernhard, Bernhardt, Bernd, Bernt, Berndt
- Benard, Bénard, Besnard, Berardi, Bernardi, Bernardin, Bernardini, Bernardino, Bernardo, Bernardoni, Bernardy
- Template:Bear-surname
