= Bernd =

Bernd is a Low German short form of the given name Bernhard (English Bernard).

== List of persons with given name Bernd ==
The following people share the name Bernd.

- Bernd Brückler (born 1981), Austrian hockey player
- Bernd Cullmann (1939–2025), German sprinter
- Bernd Eichinger (1949–2011), German film producer
- Bernd Heinrich (born 1940), biologist and author at the University of Vermont
- Bernd Helmschrot (born 1947), German football player
- Bernd Herzsprung (born 1942), German actor
- Bernd Hölzenbein (1946–2024), German football player
- Bernd Jeffré (born 1964), German paracyclist
- Bernd Klenke (born 1946), German sport sailor
- Bernd Leno (born 1992), German footballer
- Bernd Meinunger (1944–2025), German lyricist and record producer
- Bernd Posselt (born 1956), German politician (CSU)
- Bernd Reichelt (born 1957), German politician
- Bernd Schneider (footballer) (born 1973), German football player
- Bernd Schneider (racing driver) (born 1964), German racecar driver
- Bernd Schröder (born 1942), German football manager
- Bernd Schuster (born 1959), German football manager and former player
- Bernd Stange (born 1948), German football manager
- Bernd Stelter (born 1961), German comedian
- Bernd Michael Rode (1946–2022), Austrian chemistry professor
- Bernd Rosemeyer (1909–1938), German racecar driver
- Bernd Alois Zimmermann (1918–1970), German composer
- Bernd Sturmfels (born 1962), mathematician teaching at UC Berkeley
- Bernd Leno (born 1992), German football player, goalkeeper playing for Fulham F.C.
- Thomas Anders (born 1963), German singer, lead singer of Modern Talking, birth name is Bernd

== Characters ==
- Bernd das Brot, German children's television character
- Bernd Doppler, character in TV series Dark

== See also ==
- Barend, Barends, Barnard, Behrendt, Bendt, Bent, Berend, Berent Berendt, Behrent, Bernard, Bernhard, Bernhardt, Bernd, Bernt, Berndt
- Benard, Bénard, Besnard, Berardi, Bernardi, Bernardin, Bernardini, Bernardino, Bernardo, Bernardoni, Bernardy
- Template:Bear-surname
