= Barnard (surname) =

Barnard is a surname, and may refer to:

== A ==
- Alfred Barnard (1837–1918), British brewing and distilling historian
- Alonzo Barnard (1817–1905), American missionary to Native Americans
- Amanda Barnard (born 1971), Australian theoretical physicist
- Aneurin Barnard (born 1987), Welsh actor
- Andrew Barnard (1773–1855), Irish-born British Army general
- Andrew Barnard (cricketer) (born 1957), English cricketer
- Anne Barnard, American journalist
- Lady Anne Barnard (1750–1825), Scottish travel writer, artist and socialite
- Anne Henslow Barnard (1833–1899), British botanical artist
- Anton Barnard (born 1958), South African rugby union footballer
- Arthur Barnard (1929–2018), American sprinter

== B ==
- Bettie Cilliers-Barnard (1914–2010), South African artist
- Bill Barnard (1886–1958), New Zealand politician
- Bob Barnard (musician) (1933–2022), Australian jazz trumpeter
- Brooks Barnard (born 1979), American football punter

== C ==
- Catherine Barnard, British legal scholar and academic
- Cecil Barnard aka Hotep Idris Galeta (1941–2010), South African jazz pianist
- Charles Barnard (American football) (1915–2008), American football player
- Charles Barnard (castaway) (1781–1840), American castaway
- Charles Barnard (writer) (1838–1920), American reporter, playwright and writer
- Charles A. Barnard (American football) (1880–1977), American football player and coach
- Charles A. Barnard (politician) (1907–1956), American politician from Wisconsin
- Charles R. Barnard (1883–1948), American politician from Wisconsin
- C. D. Barnard (Charles Douglas Barnard) (1895–1971), British racing pilot
- Charlotte Alington Barnard (1830–1869), English poet and hymn-writer
- Chester Barnard (1886–1961), American telecoms executive and author
- Chester S. Barnard (Chester Smith Barnard) (1894–1952), American football player and coach
- Chris Barnard (author) (1939–2015), South African writer
- Chris Barnard (footballer) (1947–2025), Welsh footballer
- Christiaan Barnard (1922–2001), South African surgeon
- Christopher J. Barnard (1952–2007), British evolutionary biologist
- Claude Barnard (1890–1957), Australian politician
- Clio Barnard (born 1965), British film director
- Conrad Barnard (born 1979), South African rugby union footballer

== D ==
- Daniel D. Barnard (1797–1861), American politician from New York
- Darren Barnard (born 1971), British footballer
- David Barnard (born 1951), Canadian computer scientist and academic
- Diane Barnard (born 1964), English golfer and broadcaster
- Dianne Kohler Barnard, South African journalist and politician
- Donny Barnard (born 1984), English footballer
- Dorothy Wedderburn (née Barnard, 1925–2012), British economist and academic
- Doug Barnard Jr. (1922–2018), American lawyer and politician

== E ==
- Eben Barnard (born 1992), South African rugby union footballer
- Ed Barnard (born 1995), English cricketer
- Edmund Broughton Barnard (1856–1930), British landowner, politician and sportsman
- Édouard-André Barnard (1835–1898), militia officer from Lower Canada
- Edward Barnard (politician) (c.1806–1885), Canadian politician from Quebec
- Edward Barnard (provost) (1717–1781), English provost of Eton College
- Edward Chester Barnard (1863–1921), American topographer
- Edward Emerson Barnard (1857–1923), American astronomer
- Edward George Barnard (1778–1851), British shipbuilder and politician
- Edward William Barnard (1791–1828), British cleric, scholar and poet
- Elisa Barnard (born 1993), Australian recurve archer
- Eric Barnard (1927–2018), British neuroscientist
- Eric Barnard (politician) (1924–2017), Australian politician
- Ernest Barnard (1874–1931), American baseball administrator
- E. A. B. Barnard (Ettwell Augustine Bracher Barnard) (1872–1953), English antiquarian, local historian and genealogist
- Eusebius Barnard (1802–1865), American abolitionist

== F ==
- Frances Catherine Barnard (1796–1869), English author
- Francis Barnard (English cricketer) (1902–1996), English cricketer
- Francis George Allman Barnard (1857–1932), Australian naturalist, pharmacist, Victorian cricketer and mayor
- Francis Jones Barnard, (1829–1889), Canadian entrepreneur and politician
- Francis Stillman Barnard (1856–1936), Canadian politician from British Columbia, son of Francis Jones Barnard
- Frank Barnard (author) (born 1938), British novelist and journalist
- F. L. Barnard (Franklyn Leslie Barnard) (1896–1927), British air racing and airline pilot
- Fred Barnard (1846–1896), English illustrator, caricaturist and genre painter
- Frederick Augusta Barnard (1742–1830), British royal librarian
- Frederick A. P. Barnard (1809–1889), American scientist and academic

== G ==
- Geoff Barnard (born 1946), English football goalkeeper
- Geoffrey Barnard (1902–1974), British Royal Navy officer
- George Alfred Barnard (1915–2002), British statistician
- George Barnard (zoologist) (1831–1894), British ornithologist and entomologist
- George G. Barnard (George Gardner Barnard) (c.1829–1879), American lawyer and politician from New York State
- George Grey Barnard (1863–1938), American sculptor
- George Henry Barnard (1868–1954), Canadian lawyer and politician
- George N. Barnard (1819–1902), American Civil War photographer
- George Barnard (cricketer) (1804–1827), English cricketer
- George William Barnard (1873–1941), Australian politician
- Gwen Barnard (1912–1988), British painter and printmaker

== H ==
- Hannah Jenkins Barnard (1754–1825), American Quaker minister
- Hayes Barnard, American technology entrepreneur
- Hendrik Barnard (born 1964), South African cricketer
- Henk Barnard (1922–2003), Dutch writer of children's literature
- Henry Barnard (1811–1900), American educationalist
- Henry Barnard (judge) (1891–1981), English judge
- Henry Watson Barnard (1792–1855), English cleric and cricketer
- Henry William Barnard (1799–1857), British Army lieutenant-general
- Henry C. Barnard (born 1837), American politician from Wisconsin
- Henry D. Barnard, adopted name of Chalmers Bryant, fictional character in the novel Lost Horizon
- Henry E. Barnard (Henry Eells Barnard) (1837–1919), American lawyer and politician from New York
- Hezekiah Barnard (fl.1835), American politician from Massachusetts
- Holly Barnard, American geographer

== I ==
- Isaac D. Barnard (1791–1831), American lawyer and politician
- Ivor Barnard (1887–1953), English stage, radio and film actor

== J ==
- Jacobus Barnard (born 1967), South African cricketer.
- James Barnard (1935–2026), South African water treatment engineer
- J. Lynn Barnard (James Lynn Barnard) (1867–1941), American football coach and academic
- Jan Barnard (1929–2012), South African long-distance runner
- Jannie Barnard (1945–1985), South African rugby union footballer
- J. Laurens Barnard (Jerry Laurens Barnard) (1928–1991), American zoologist, taxonomist and carcinologist
- Job Barnard (1844–1923), American judge
- John Barnard (born 1946), British race car designer
- John Barnard (biographer) (died 1683), English biographer of Peter Heylyn
- John Barnard (clergyman) (1681–1770), American Congregationalist minister from Massachusetts
- John Barnard (composer) (born 1948), English church music composer
- John Barnard (cricketer) (1794–1878), English cricketer
- John Barnard (music publisher) (fl.1625–1649), published a collection of English cathedral music
- John Barnard (musician) (born 1948), British church music composer
- John Barnard (politician) (1685–1764), British merchant, politician and Lord Mayor of London
- John Barnard (shipbuilder) (1705–1784), English shipbuilder to the Royal Navy
- John Barnard (supporter of James II) (born 1662), English Jacobite, son of John Barnard the biographer
- John G. Barnard (1815–1882), American Union Army general of the American Civil War
- Joseph Edwin Barnard (1868/70–1949), British microscopist and hatter
- Joseph Osmond Barnard (1816–1865), English miniature painter and engraver
- Josephine Barnard (born 1978), South African cricketer
- Juana Josefina Cavasos Barnard (c.1822–1906), Mexican-American Indian captive, slaveowner, and pioneer in central Texas
- Junior Barnard (1920–1951), American Western swing guitarist

== K ==
- Kate Barnard (1875–1930), American politician and official from Oklahoma
- Kathryn Barnard (1938–2015), American nurse and researcher
- Keppel Harcourt Barnard (1887–1964), South African zoologist

== L ==
- Lambert Barnard (c.1485–1567), English Renaissance painter
- Lance Barnard (1919–1997), Australian politician
- Laura Belle Barnard (1907–1992) was an American missionary, educator and author
- Lee Barnard (born 1984), English football player
- Leigh Barnard (born 1958), English football player
- Leon Barnard, South African rugby league footballer
- Leslie Gordon Barnard (1890–1961), Canadian author
- Lester Barnard (1894–1985), American college sports coach
- Linda Barnard (born 1968), South African tennis player
- Lisa Barnard (born 1967), British photographer and artist

== M ==
- Margaret Barnard (1898–1992), British painter and linocut maker
- Marion Harvie Barnard (1872–1969), British-American suffragist
- Marius Barnard (surgeon) (1927–2014), South African surgeon
- Marius Barnard (tennis) (born 1969), South African professional tennis player
- Marjorie Barnard (1897–1987), Australian writer
- Mark Barnard (born 1975), English footballer
- Mary Barnard (1909–2002), American poet and translator
- Mary Baylis Barnard (1870–1946), English artist
- Megan Barnard (born 1984), Australian sports presenter
- Michael Barnard (politician) (1942–1999), Australian politician
- Mick Barnard, English rock guitarist
- Mike Barnard (cricketer, born 1990), English cricketer
- Mike Barnard (sportsman) (Henry Michael Barnard) (1933–2018), English cricketer and footballer
- Mildred Barnard (1908–2000), Australian biometrician, mathematician and statistician
- Mordaunt Roger Barnard (1828–1906), Church of England clergyman and translator

== N ==
- Neal D. Barnard (born 1953), American medical doctor, author and activist
- Niel Barnard (1949–2025), South African academic and intelligence chief

== O ==
- Ockie Barnard (born 2001), South African rugby union footballer

== P ==
- Paolo Barnard (born 1958), Italian journalist
- Pat Barnard (born 1981), South African rugby union footballer
- Paul Barnard (born 1973), Australian rules footballer
- Paul Barnard (politician) (born 1947/8), American politician from Wyoming
- Philip Barnard (MP) (born by 1492), English Member of Parliament
- Philip Augustus Barnard (1813–1897), British painter
- Phoebe Barnard (born 1961), American global change scientist
- Pieter Barnard (born 1970), South African cricketer

== R ==
- Ray Barnard (1933–2017), English footballer
- Rebecca Barnard (born 1960), Australian singer, songwriter and musician
- Robbie Barnard (1941–2013), South African rugby union footballer
- Robert Barnard (1936–2013), English mystery writer and critic
- Ronald L. Barnard (1927–1981), Bermudian politician

== S ==
- Sam Barnard (actor) (born 1985), British actor
- Sam Barnard (jockey) (c.1776–1846), British jockey
- Sidney Barnard (1914–1999), English professional footballer
- Simeon Barnard (1844–1924), racehorse owner and racing official in South Australia
- Solomon Barnard (born 1956), South African cricketer
- Stephanie Barnard, American politician from Washington State
- Steve Barnard (born 1968), English musician, songwriter and music producer
- Susan Barnard (born 1961), British swimmer

== T ==
- Taylor Barnard (born 2004), English racing driver
- Thomas Barnard (c.1727–1806), Anglican bishop in Ireland
- Thomas Barnard (MP) (1830–1909), English politician
- Timpoochee Barnard (1776–1834), Native American major of Battle of Calebee Creek
- Toby Barnard (born 1945), British historian
- Tom Barnard (born 1951), American radio show host
- Trevor Barnard (born 1938), Australian pianist

== W ==
- Wally Barnard (1898–1982), English footballer
- Willem Barnard (1923–2012), South African rugby union footballer
- William Barnard (bishop) (1697–1768), Irish bishop of Derry
- William Barnard (engraver) (1774–1849), English mezzotint engraver
- William Barnard (shipbuilder) (1735–1795), English shipbuilder
- William O. Barnard (1852–1939), American politician from Indiana
- William Stebbins Barnard (1849–1887), American biologist

== Z ==
- Zani Barnard (born 1999), South African tennis player

== See also ==
- Barend, Barends, Barnard, Behrendt, Bendt, Bent, Berend, Berent Berendt, Behrent, Bernard, Bernhard, Bernhardt, Bernd, Bernt, Berndt
- Benard, Bénard, Besnard, Berardi, Bernardi, Bernardin, Bernardini, Bernardino, Bernardo, Bernardoni, Bernardy
- Template:Bear-surname
