= Berardi =

Berardi is an Italian surname. It is derived from the Germanic berahard, composed by *berô ("bear") and *harduz ("hard", "brave"), and can therefore be interpreted as "daring bear". Notable people with the surname include:

- Amato Berardi (1958–2025), Italian-American politician and businessman
- Angelo Berardi (1636–1694), Italian music theorist and composer
- Antonio Berardi (born 1968), British fashion designer
- Carbo Sebastiano Berardi (1719–1768), Italian Roman Catholic priest and canon lawyer
- Cristofano Berardi, Italian engraver
- Domenico Berardi (born 1994), Italian footballer
- Eugenio Berardi (1921–1977), Italian architect and engineer
- Fabio Berardi (born 1959), Sammarinese politician
- Fabio Berardi (engraver) (1728–1788), Italian engraver
- Filippo Berardi (born 1992), Sammarinese footballer
- Franco Berardi (born 1949), Italian Marxist theorist
- Gaetano Berardi (born 1988), Swiss footballer
- Giancarlo Berardi (born 1949), Italian comic book writer
- Giovanni Berardi (1380–1449), Italian cardinal
- Joe Berardi (born 1954), American retired professional bowler
- Pasquale Berardi (born 1983), Italian footballer
- Pier Niccolò Berardi (1904–1989), Italian architect
- Rosetta Berardi (born 1944), Italian artist
- Simone Berardi (born 1979), Italian footballer

== See also ==
- Barend, Barends, Barnard, Behrendt, Bendt, Bent, Berend, Berent Berendt, Behrent, Bernard, Bernhard, Bernhardt, Bernd, Bernt, Berndt
- Benard, Bénard, Besnard, Berardi, Bernardi, Bernardin, Bernardini, Bernardino, Bernardo, Bernardoni, Bernardy
- Template:Bear-surname
