= Bernardin =

Bernardin is both a given name and a surname. Notable people with the name include:

Given name:

- Bernardin-François Fouquet (1705–1785), French Catholic prelate, Cardinal, abbot and archbishop of Embrun
- Bernardin Frankopan (1453–1529), Croatian nobleman, diplomat and warrior
- Bernardin Gantin (1922–2008), Beninese cardinal
- Bernardin Gigault de Bellefonds (1630–1694), French nobleman, soldier and courtier
- Bernardin Matam (born 1990), French weightlifter
- Bernardin Mungul Diaka (1933–1999), Prime Minister of Zaire
- Bernardin Palaj (1894–1947), Franciscan cleric, folklorist and poet
- Bernardin Pavlović (18th century), Croatian Franciscan writer
- Jacques-Henri Bernardin de Saint-Pierre (1737–1814), French writer and botanist

Surname:

- Jacques-Henri Bernardin de Saint-Pierre (1737–1814), French writer and botanist
- Al Bernardin (1928–2009), American restaurateur and businessman
- François Bernardin Azaïs (1870–1986), French missionary and archeologist
- Giorgio Bernardin (1928–2011), retired Italian footballer
- Joseph Bernardin (1928–1996), American cardinal
- Marc Bernardin (born 1971), American journalist, TV writer

== Other uses ==
- Bernardin (agriculture), brand of tractors, combines and implements are manufactured in San Vincente, Argentina
- Bernardin-Johnson House, a historic home located at Evansville, Indiana

== See also ==
- Le Bernardin
- Bernardin (agriculture)
- Barend, Barends, Barnard, Behrendt, Berend, Berent, Berendt, Behrent, Bernard, Bernhard, Bernhardt, Bernt, Berndt
- Benard, Bénard, Besnard, Berardi, Bernardi, Bernardin, Bernardini, Bernardo, Bernardoni, Bernardy
- Template:Bear-surname
