= Bernardoni =

Bernardoni is a surname. Notable people with the surname include:

- Giovanni Maria Bernardoni (1541–1605), Jesuit and Italian architect
- Giuseppe Bernardoni (1897–1942), Italian sprinter
- Paul Bernardoni (born 1997), French footballer

== See also ==
- Bernardini (disambiguation)
- Barend, Barends, Barnard, Behrendt, Berend, Berent, Berendt, Behrent, Bernard, Bernhard, Bernhardt, Bernt, Berndt
- Benard, Bénard, Besnard, Berardi, Bernardi, Bernardin, Bernardini, Bernardo, Bernardoni, Bernardy
- Template:Bear-surname
