= Bernardi =

Bernardi is an Italian surname. Notable people with the surname include:

- Adria Bernardi, American novelist and translator
- Andrew Bernardi (born 1965), British violinist, music entrepreneur, educationalist, and festival director
- Antonino de Bivona-Bernardi (1774 or 1778–1837), Sicilian botanist, bryologist and phycologist
- Christian Bernardi (footballer) (born 1990), Argentine professional footballer
- Christina Bernardi (born 1990), Australian footballer
- Christine Bernardi (1955–2018), French mathematician
- Claudia Bernardi (born 1955), Argentine artist
- Clothilde de Bernardi (born 1994), French tennis player
- Cory Bernardi (born 1969), Australian politician
- Daniel Bernardi (born 1964), American scholar and filmmaker
- Danny Bernardi (born 1966), British writer
- Enrico Bernardi (1841–1919), Italian inventor of the gasoline internal-combustion engine
- Ernani Bernardi (1911–2006), American politician
- Fabrizio Bernardi (born 1972), Italian astronomer
- Fiorenza de Bernardi (1928–2025), first commercial airline pilot of Italy
- Francesco Bernardi (painter), also known as Bigolaro (first half of the 17th century), Italian painter
- Frank Bernardi (born 1933), American football player
- Georges Bernardi (1922–1999), French entomologist
- Giacomo Bernardi, American biologist
- Giuliano Bernardi (1939–1977), Italian opera singer
- Giuseppe Bernardi (1694–1773), also called Torretto, Italian sculptor
- Guido Bernardi (1921–2002), Italian cyclist
- Herschel Bernardi (1923–1986), American actor
- Jack Bernardi (1909–1994), American actor
- José Oscar Bernardi (born 1954), Brazilian football player
- Laurent Bernardi (born 1988), French football player
- Lina Bernardi (1938–2026), Italian actress
- Lorenzo Bernardi (born 1968), Italian volleyball player
- Lucas Bernardi (born 1977), Argentine football player
- Mario Bernardi (1930–2013), Canadian conductor and pianist
- Mario de Bernardi (1893–1959), Italian pilot
- Nicolas Bernardi (born 1976), French rally driver
- Nerio Bernardi (1899–1971), Italian film actor
- Paloma Bernardi (born 1985), Brazilian actress, entrepreneur, dancer and radio presenter
- Paolo Bernardi, Italian pathologist
- Piero De Bernardi (1926–2010), Italian screenwriter
- Roy Bernardi (born 1942), American public servant
- Tonino De Bernardi (born 1937), Italian auteur and screenwriter

== See also ==
- De Bernardi
- Barend, Barends, Barnard, Behrendt, Berend, Berent, Berendt, Behrent, Bernard, Bernhard, Bernhardt, Bernt, Berndt
- Benard, Bénard, Besnard, Berardi, Bernardi, Bernardin, Bernardini, Bernardo, Bernardoni, Bernardy
- Template:Bear-surname
