= Bernardini (surname) =

Bernardini is a family name of Italian origin.

== Geographical distribution ==
As of 2014, 72.1% of all known bearers of the surname Bernardini were residents of Italy (frequency 1:2,561), 7.8% of France (1:25,728), 7.5% of Brazil (1:82,665), 5.3% of the United States (1:204,559) and 3.9% of Argentina (1:33,341).

In Italy, the frequency of the surname was higher than the national average (1:2,561) in the following regions:

1. Tuscany (1:525)
2. Umbria (1:660)
3. Lazio (1:786)
4. Liguria (1:1,074)
5. Marche (1:1,267)

== People ==
- Alain Bernardini, band's singer I Muvrini
- Albino Bernardini (1917–2015), Italian writer and pedagogue
- Adriano Bernardini (1942–2025), Italian Roman Catholic prelate and diplomat of the Holy See
- Alessandro Bernardini (born 1987), Italian footballer
- Antonino Bernardini (born 1974), Italian footballer
- Carlo Bernardini (artist) (born 1966), Italian artist
- Carlo Bernardini (politician) (1930–2018), Italian physicist and politician
- Charles Bernardini, alderman of Chicago's 43rd Ward from 1993 until 1999
- Dean Bernardini (born 1973), American bass guitarist and backing vocalist
- Domenico Antonio Bernardini (1647–1723), Roman Catholic Bishop of Mileto and later Bishop of Castellaneta
- Ernani Bernardini (1911–2006), big-band musician turned politician in Los Angeles
- Filippo Bernardini (1884–1954), Italian Roman Catholic Archbishop
- Fulvio Bernardini (1905–1984), Italian footballer and coach
- Jean François Bernardini, band's singer I Muvrini
- Laurentius Bernardini (17th century), Roman Catholic Titular Bishop of Coronea
- Marcello Bernardini (died 1799), Italian composer and librettist
- Mariano Bernardini (born 1998), Italian football player
- Micheline Bernardini (born 1927), French dancer
- Rita Bernardini (born 1952), Italian politician
- Roberto Bernardini (born 1944), Italian professional golfer
- Severino Bernardini (born 1966), Italian long-distance runner
- Tiago Bernardini (born 1979), Brazilian footballer

== See also ==
- Barend, Barends, Barnard, Behrendt, Berend, Berent, Berendt, Behrent, Bernard, Bernhard, Bernhardt, Bernt, Berndt
- Benard, Bénard, Besnard, Bernardi, Bernardo, Bernardy
- Template:Bear-surname
