= Barend (disambiguation) =

Barend may refer to:

- Barend, a common Dutch given name
- Barend (surname)

== See also ==
- Berend
- Behrendt
