= Bernhard (surname) =

Bernhard is a surname, and may refer to:

- Anouschka Bernhard (1970–2026), German footballer
- Ben Bernhard, German cinematographer
- Bill Bernhard (1871–1949), American baseball pitcher
- Carl Gustaf Bernhard (1910–2001), Swedish physician and neurophysiologist
- Christian Bernhard (born 1963), Austrian politician
- Christoph Bernhard (1628–1692), German composer and musician
- David Bernhard, American lawyer and judge
- Dorothy Lehman Bernhard (1903–1969), American civic leader and philanthropist
- Ernst Bernhard (1896–1965), German Jungian psychoanalyst, pediatrician and astrologer
- Franck Bernhard (born 1976), French footballer
- Friedrich Bernhard (1888–1945), German general
- Georg Bernhard (1875–1944), German journalist and politician
- Gösta Bernhard (1910–1986), Swedish actor, film director and screenwriter
- Harvey Bernhard (1924–2014), American film producer
- Helen Bernhard (1921–1998), American tennis player
- Jack Bernhard (1914–1997), American film and television director
- Jennifer Bernhard (born 1966), American electrical engineer
- John Bernhard (born 1957), Swiss-American artist and photographer
- Lisa Bernhard, American journalist
- Lucian Bernhard (1883–1972), German designer and academic
- Marc Bernhard (born 1972), German politician
- Maria Ludwika Bernhard (1908–1998), Polish classical archaeologist
- Michael Bernhard (born 1981), Austrian politician
- Nadja Bernhard (born 1975), Austrian news presenter
- Otmar Bernhard (born 1946), German politician
- Robert A. Bernhard (1928–2019), American banker
- Rolf Bernhard (born 1949), Swiss long jumper
- Rudolf Bernhard (1901–1962), Swiss comedian
- Rudolph Bernhard (fl.1700), rabbi and Christian writer
- Ruth Bernhard (1905–2006), American photographer
- Sandra Bernhard (born 1955), American comedian, singer, actress and author
- Stefan Bernhard (born 1966), Swiss chemist
- Thomas Bernhard (1931–1989), Austrian playwright and novelist
- Timo Bernhard (born 1981), German sports car racer
- Torben Bernhard (born 1983), American documentary filmmaker and rap artist
- Walter Bernhard (born 1971), Swiss footballer
- William F. Bernhard (1924–2018), American cardiovascular surgeon
- Wolfgang Bernhard (born 1960), German auto executive

== See also ==
See also de:Bernhard (Familienname)

- Barend, Barends, Barnard, Behrendt, Berend, Berent, Berendt, Behrent, Bernard, Bernhard, Bernhardt, Bernt, Berndt
- Benard, Bénard, Besnard, Berardi, Bernardi, Bernardin, Bernardini, Bernardo, Bernardoni, Bernardy
- Template:Bear-surname
