= Bernardini =

Bernadini can mean:

- Bernardini (horse), thoroughbred race horse, at Darley Stable in Kentucky
- Bernardini (company), safe manufacturer and arms manufacturer which operated from 1912 to 1992
- Bernardini (surname), family name of Italian origin

== See also ==
- Bernardin
- Bernardoni
