= Besnard =

Besnard is a surname. Notable people with the surname include:

- Charlotte Besnard (1854–1931), born Charlotte Dubray, a French sculptor
- David Besnard (born 1977), Australian racing driver
- Elena Samokysh-Sudkovskaya (née Besnard), Russian painter and illustrator
- Florent Besnard (born 1984), French footballer
- Gérard Besnard (1945–2026), French cyclist
- Gustave Besnard (1833–1903), French admiral and naval minister
- Jacques Besnard, French entertainer
- Jean-Louis Besnard (1734–1791), Canadian fur trader
- Katty Besnard, musician
- Lucien Besnard, French playwright
- Marie Besnard (1896–1980), French poisoner
- Nicole Besnard (1928–2017), French actress
- Paul-Albert Besnard (1849–1934), French painter
- Philippe Besnard (1885–1971), French sculptor
- Pierre Besnard (1886–1947), French revolutionary syndicalist
- René Besnard, French politician
- Wladimir Besnard (1890–1960), French biologist and oceanographer

== See also ==
- Barend, Barends, Barnard, Behrendt, Berend, Berent, Berendt, Behrent, Bernard, Bernhard, Bernhardt, Bernt, Berndt
- Benard, Bénard, Besnard, Berardi, Bernardi, Bernardin, Bernardini, Bernardo, Bernardoni, Bernardy
- Template:Bear-surname
