= De Bernardi =

De Bernardi, de Bernardi or DeBernardi is a surname. Notable people with the surname include:

- Clothilde de Bernardi (born 1994), French tennis player
- Enrico Debernardi (1885–1972), Italian footballer
- Fiorenza de Bernardi (1928–2025), first commercial airline pilot of Italy
- Forrest DeBernardi (1899–1970), American basketball player
- Fred DeBernardi (1949–2020), American football player
- Jörg De Bernardi (born 1973), Swiss diplomat and politician
- Mario de Bernardi (1893–1959), Italian pilot
- Piero De Bernardi (1926–2010), Italian screenwriter
- Tonino De Bernardi (born 1937), Italian auteur and screenwriter

== See also ==
- Bernardi
