= General Bernard =

General Bernard may refer to:

- Denis Bernard (British Army officer) (1882–1956), British Army lieutenant general
- George Bernard (died 1820), British Army general
- Reuben F. Bernard (1834–1903), U.S. Army brigadier general
- Simon Bernard (1779–1839), U.S. Army brigadier general and French Army lieutenant general

== See also ==
- Friedrich Bernhard (1888–1945), German Wehrmacht lieutenant general
