= Kordes =

Kordes is a surname of German origin. People with the surname include:

- Berend Kordes (1762–1823), German writer
- Wilhelm Kordes (1865–1935), German horticulturist

== See also ==
- Korde, Indian surname
- Qordis, Star Wars character
