= Pharadise =

PHaradise was a permanent light installation conceived by NatHalie Braun Barends at the Kunsthalle Mannheim, which was inaugurated on 9 March 2007, located at the dome and the adjacent roof tops of the Hermann Billing Bau at Kunsthalle Mannheim.

Due to reconstruction of the Kunsthalle, the installation was removed. Following a legal dispute and a decision of the German Supreme Court which stated, that the removal of the work does not infringe the artist's moral rights, the installation will most likely not be rebuilt afterwards.

== Description ==
It represents the act of breathing before falling asleep. The inspiration is represented by cold white light flowing vertically from below into the dome, and the exhalation by warm white colored lights air flowing horizontally towards the rooftops beside the cupola.

Thanks to this evening light motion, the viewer has the experience of reliving the breath of the architectural structure, which is transformed into a light sculpture in the Skulpturengarten. The "breathing" rhythm becomes slower as time pass by during the evening, symbolizing falling asleep.

PHaradise overlooks the Phoenix Room of HHole for Mannheim, a multimedia installation at the rooftop of the Athene-Trakt of the Museum, where, among other things, natural light flows into the museum through its seven holes, meeting artificial light coming from below, thus creating a symbolic imaginary space between heaven and earth.

The architecture of the Kunsthalle becomes "alive", changing its own breathing rhythm similar to a living being.
