= Reichelt =

Reichelt is a German surname, a variant of Reichel. It originates from the root ric meaning power. The surname may refer to the following notable people:

- Bernd Reichelt, German politician
- Franz Reichelt (1879–1912), Austrian-born French tailor and inventor
- Hannes Reichelt (born 1980), Austrian alpine ski racer
- Hans Reichelt (1925–2025), German politician
- Helmut Reichelt (born 1939), German Marxist economist and philosopher
- Ingeborg Reichelt (1928–2022), German soprano singer
- Julian Reichelt (born 1980), German journalist
- Julius Reichelt (1637–1717), German mathematician and astronomer
- Kalle Reichelt (1933–2016), Norwegian medical researcher
- Karl Ludvig Reichelt (1877–1952), Lutheran missionary
- Patrick Reichelt (born 1988), German–Filipino footballer
- Paul Reichelt (1898–1981), Generalleutnant in the Wehrmacht
- Rudolf Reichelt (1890–1971), German rower
- Tom Reichelt (born 1982), German cross country skier
