= Cristofano =

Cristofano is a given name. Notable people with the name include:

- Cristofano Allori (1577–1621), Italian portrait painter of the late Florentine Mannerist school
- Cristofano Berardi (18th century), an Italian engraver
- Cristofano Bertelli (active c. 1525), Italian engraver
- Cristofano dell'Altissimo (c. 1525 – 1605), Italian painter in Florence
- Cristofano Gherardi (1508–1556), Italian painter of the late-Renaissance or Mannerist period, active mainly in Florence and Tuscany
- Cristofano Malvezzi (1547–1599), Italian organist and composer of the late Renaissance
- Cristofano Robetta (1462–1535), Italian artist, goldsmith, and engraver
- Giovanni Cristofano Amaduzzi (1740–1792), distinguished Italian philologist
