= Korde =

Korde is a surname of Indian Marathi origin. People with the name include:

- Shirish Korde (born 1945), Ugandan composer
- T. S. Korde (1886–19??), Indian leader and landlord
- Vinayak Korde, Indian politician

== See also ==
- Kordes (disambiguation), German surname
- Kurde, the Kurdish language
- Korday, village and district in Kazakhstan
