= Behrendt =

Behrendt is a German surname. Notable people with the surname include:

- Brian Behrendt (born 1991), German footballer
- Dagmar Roth-Behrendt (born 1953), German Member of the European Parliament, lawyer
- Dirk Behrendt (born 1971), German politician
- Gerhard Behrendt (1929–2006), German film director, puppet designer
- Greg Behrendt (born 1963), American stand-up comedian
- Holger Behrendt (born 1964), German gymnast
- Jan Behrendt (born 1967), German luger
- Jutta Behrendt (born 1960), German competition rower
- Kerstin Behrendt (born 1967), German athlete
- Klaus J. Behrendt (born 1960), German actor
- Larissa Behrendt (born 1969), Aboriginal Australian academic and writer
- Lars Behrendt (born 1973), German bobsledder
- Mario Behrendt (born 1960), East German boxer
- Nina Behrendt (born 1983), German politician
- Richard Fritz Behrendt (1908–1973), German sociologist
- Vanessa Behrendt (born 1984), German politician
- Walter Behrendt (1914–1997), German politician
- Walter Curt Behrendt (1884–1945), German-American architect
- Wolfgang Behrendt (born 1936), German amateur boxer

== See also ==
- Barend, Barends, Barnard, Behrendt, Bent, Berend, Berent Berendt, Behrent, Bernard, Bernhard, Bernhardt, Bernd, Bernt, Berndt
- Benard, Bénard, Besnard, Berardi, Bernardi, Bernardin, Bernardini, Bernardino, Bernardo, Bernardoni, Bernardy
- Template:Bear-surname
