= Bénard (surname) =

Bénard is a French surname. Notable people with the surname include:

- Abraham-Joseph Bénard (1750–1822), French actor of the Comédie-Française
- Aimé Bénard (1873–1938), Canadian politician
- André Bénard (1922–2016), French industrialist
- Anne-José Madeleine Henriette Bénard (1928–2010), better known as Cécile Aubry, French actress
- Catherine Éléonore Bénard (1740–1769), French courtier
- Claude Bénard (1926–2025), French athlete
- Dominique Bénard, French Scout Movement executive
- Édouard Bénard (born 1995), French politician
- Émile Bénard (1844–1929), French architect and painter
- Félix-Antoine Bénard, Canadian actor
- Henri Bénard (1874–1939), French physicist known for his research on convection
- Laurent Bénard (1573–1620), French Benedictine monk
- Michel Bénard (born c.1713), councillor of the Conseil Supérieur of New France
- Pierre Bénard (1898–1946), French journalist
- Raoul Bénard (1881–1961), French sculptor

== See also ==
- Barend, Barends, Barnard, Behrendt, Berend, Berent, Berendt, Behrent, Bernard, Bernhard, Bernhardt, Bernt, Berndt
- Benard, Bénard, Besnard, Bernardi, Bernardo, Bernardy
- Template:Bear-surname
