= Bernardin (agriculture) =

Bernardin agriculture machinery brand are manufactured by Agroindustrial San Vicente, S.A. in San Vincente, Argentina. The brand was founded in 1925.

Bernardin is best known for the combines and implements that it builds. Bernardin also manufactures tractors from 65 hp up to 260 hp, including articulated tractors. Other products include pull-type sprayers, drills, and self-propelled forage harvesters.

== Production ==
=== Combines ===
- Bernardin M15
- Bernardin M17
- Bernardin M19
- Bernardin M20
- Bernardin M21
- Bernardin M23
- Bernardin ML60
- Bernardin M2120
- Bernardin M2140
- Bernardin M2160
- Bernardin KG-6 "Poliese" (picker harvester)

=== Implements ===
- Bernardin FA5000 Omega
- Bernardin PA 3500 Genesis
- Bernardin PA 3500 Orion
- Bernardin PAM 3000
- Bernardin PA 2.5
- Bernardin A 40

=== Tractors ===
- Bernardin B190 DTA / B227 DTA / B230 DTA / B260 DTA
