= Hans Bernt Myhre =

Norwegian politician

Hans Bernt Myhre (8 February 1817 – 31 August 1863) was a Norwegian politician.

He was elected to the Norwegian Parliament in 1854, 1857 and 1859, representing the constituency of Stavanger. He worked as a carpenter in that city.
