= André Bénard =

French industrialist

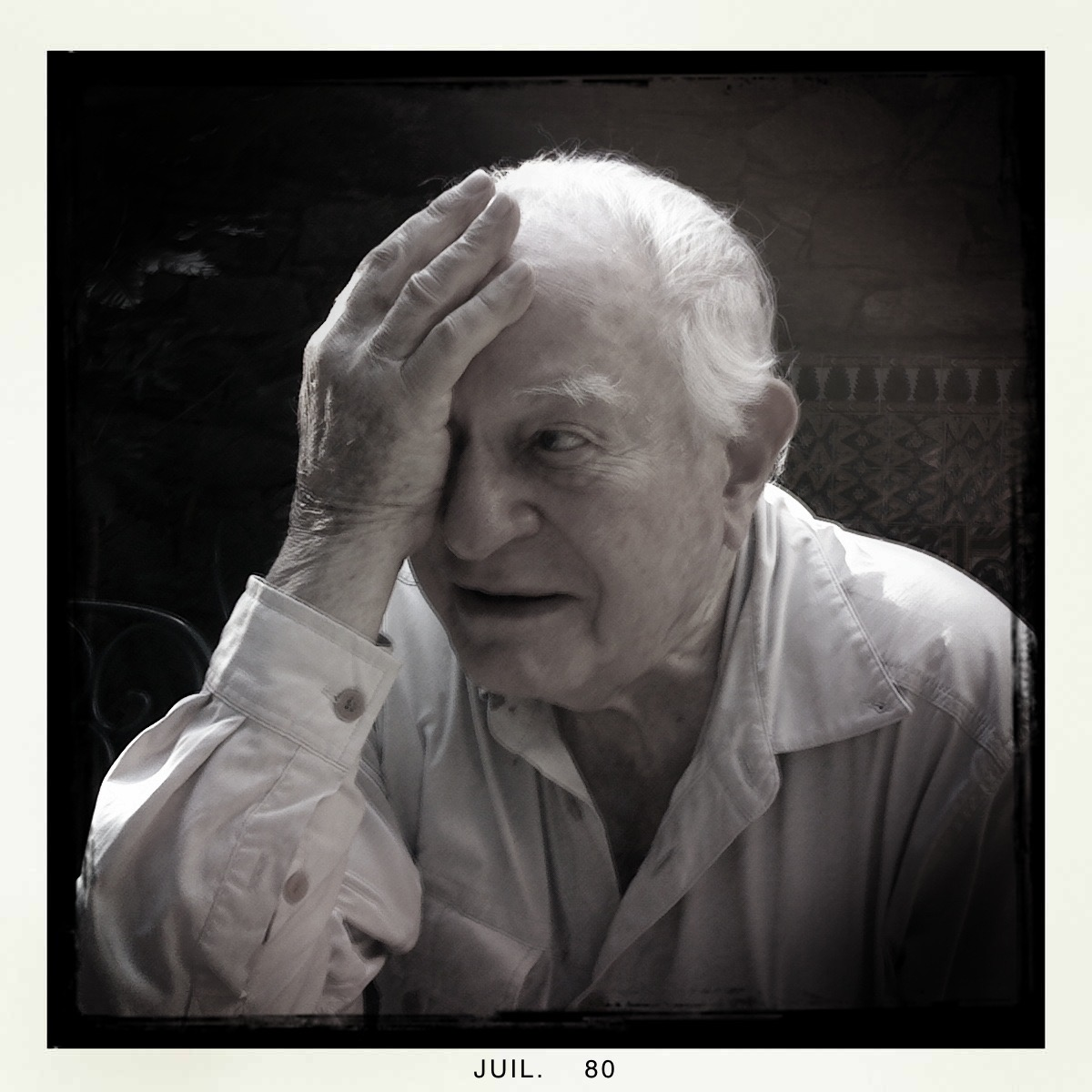
André Bénard

André Bénard (19 August 1922 – 15 March 2016) was a French engineer and an industrialist, who worked as one of the seven members of the Committee of the managing directors of Shell and, after his retirement from Shell, was designated copresident, and shortly after president, of the Eurotunnel company. As chairman of Eurotunnel, he "helped lead the construction of the Channel Tunnel linking France and Britain". He retired as chairman of Eurotunnel Group after the 31-mile tunnel opened in 1994, but later was accused by investors of misleading them about prospects for the project. In 2007, a French court cleared him of those charges."

He was married to Jacqueline Bénard née Preiss, a former French magazine publisher.

== Biography ==
Born Pierre Jacques André Bénard in Draveil, in a southern suburb of Paris, on Aug. 19, 1922, Bénard passed the entrance examination of École polytechnique (the famous French cadet and engineer school) in 1942. But because of World War II, he joined the French Resistance in southern France then in North Africa.

After having landed in Provence in August 1944, he was fighting around Belfort (south to Alsace) when Polytechnique recalled him in order to begin studies (autumn 1944).

Two years later, he joined the Royal Dutch Shell Group as an engineer. Fifteen years later, he was appointed a senior executive, first in France, then in the Netherlands and United Kingdom : from 1972 to 1983, he was one of the seven general managers of the Anglo-Dutch Group.

Three years after he retired from Shell, in 1986, he was approached to work on the construction of the Channel tunnel, as the co-chairman of the Anglo-French company in charge of supervising the building process (Eurotunnel). Fours years later (1990), he became its only chairman, a position he held until 1994, date of the opening of the transnational infrastructure.

He retired in 1994 and died in Paris in 2016.

== Bibliography ==
- André Bénard (préf. Jean-Pierre Mignard), Le Hasard et l'Opiniâtreté : de la Royal Dutch Shell au Tunnel sous la Manche [« Chance and Stubbornness: from the Royal Dutch Shell to the Channel Tunnel »], Paris, éditions L'Harmattan, 6 September 2016, 208 p. (ISBN 2343096589, ASIN B01MRILTE1), description of André Bénard’s autobiography on a merchant site.
