= Margit Bernhardt =

German figure skater

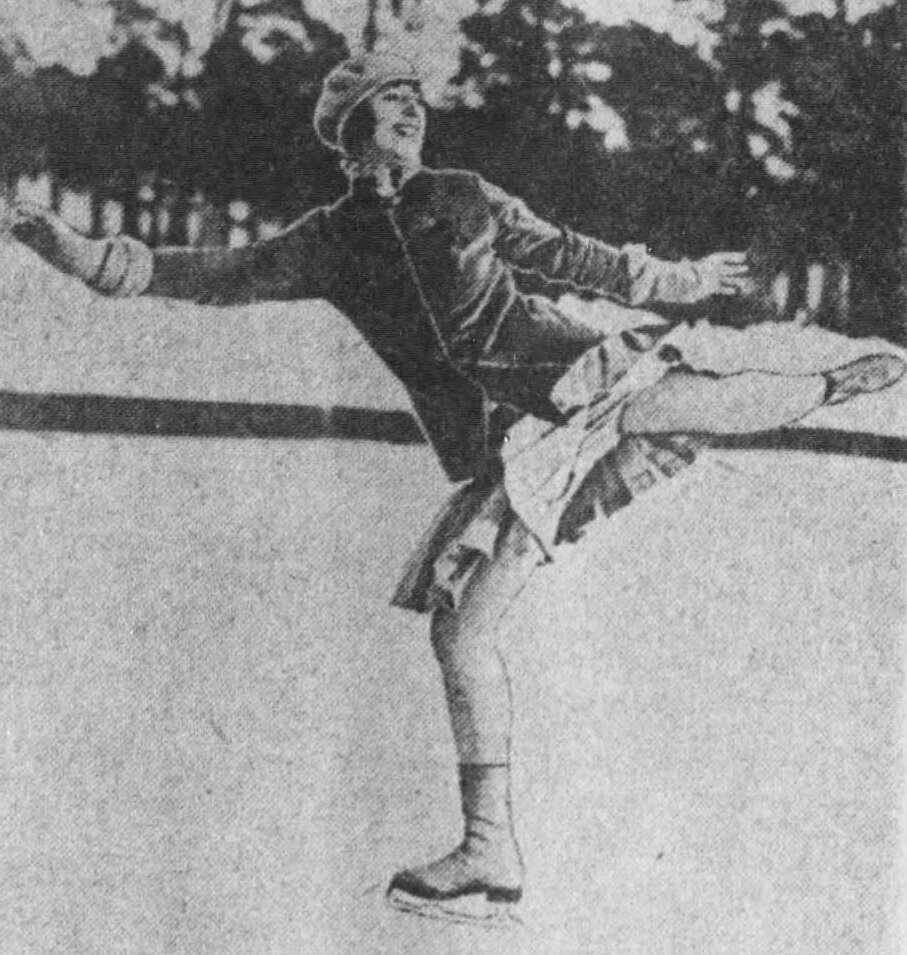
- Bernhardt in 1928 practicing at St. Moritz

Personal information
- Born: 6 August 1897

Figure skating career
- Country: Germany

Margit Bernhardt (born 6 August 1897, date of death unknown) was a German figure skater. She competed at the 1928 Winter Olympics.
