= Richard Fritz Behrendt =

German sociologist

Richard Fritz Behrendt (6 February 1908 in Gliwice, Upper Silesia – 17 October 1972 in Basel) was a German sociologist.

== Life ==
Behrendt was born in Gliwice, Prussia (now Poland) on February 2, 1908. After studying business in Nuremberg, political science in Cologne and Basel (where he earned a doctorate in 1931), and at the London School of Economics, he worked as a journalist before obtaining a professorship at the University of Panama in 1935.

From 1941 to 1943 he was a professor in the School of Inter-American Affairs at the University of New Mexico. After a stint at the Interamerican University of Panama, as director of the Institute of Social and Economic Research, he moved to Colgate University in the US in the Fall of 1945, and was promoted to full professor of international affairs in 1946. In 1950 he moved again to the University of Florida.

He continued to work as a professor in the US until 1953, when he returned to Europe as an extraordinary professor of sociology at the University of Bern, becoming an ordinary professor in 1956. Beginning in 1960, he directed the institut de sociologie et des questions de développement socio-économique there. From 1965 to 1972 he was a professor of sociology at the Free University of Berlin.

He died by suicide on 17 October 1972 in Basel.

== Selected publications ==
Behrendt's books included:

- Die Schweiz und der Imperialismus, die Volkswirtschaft des hochkapitalistischen Kleinstaates im Zeitalter des politischen und ökonomischen Nationalismus (Zürich: Rascher & Co., 1932)
- Modern Latin America in Social Science Literature, a Selected, Annotated Bibliography of Books, Pamphlets, and Periodicals in English in the Fields of Economics, Politics, and Sociology of Latin America (University of New Mexico Press, 1949)
- Das Problem der "unentwickelten" Länder (Verwaltungs-und Wirtschaftsakademie Essen 2, Essen, 1956)
- Dynamische Gesellschaft: Über die Gestaltbarkeit der Zukunft (Alfred Scherz Verlag, 1963)
- L'homme à la lumière de la sociologie (Paris: Payot, 1964; translated from German by Lucien Piau
- Sozial Strategie für Entwicklungsländer (S. Fischer, 1965)
- Zwischen Anarchie und neuen Ordnungen: soziologische Versuche über Probleme unserer Welt im Wandel (Freiburg: Verlag Rombach, 1967)
