= NatHalie Braun Barends =

German artist

Nathalie Braun Barends, also known as Petsire, is an international multi-media artist whose work includes paintings, photography, video, light installations and happenings. Her works are shown, and part of collections, in museums and cultural institutions worldwide.

== Life and works ==
Nathalie Braun Barends was born in Germany and grew up mostly in Brasil and Chile. From 1987 to 1991, she attended the University of São Paulo in Paulista where in 1994, she earned a Lato Sensu degree in International Marketing. In 1993 she exhibited at the House of Japanese culture and in 1994 she made her first solo exhibition at the Goethe Institute of São Paulo. In 1994, she was an invited artist at the Academy of Fine Arts in Vienna and in 1995 she made her first solo international exhibition at the Austrian Cultural Center "Palais Pallfy" in Vienna; in 1997 she was an artist in residence at the Banff Centre for International Art in Canada. In 1998 Braun Barends was an exchange artist at the Academy of Arts, Berlin. Between 1996 and 2001, she earned a Stricto Sensu master's degree in Communication and Arts with Dr. Prof. Manuel Moran at the University of São Paulo, Brazil. In 2001 she founded Halie Light International, Inc. and was also co-president, designer and consultant of L'Observatoire International, Inc in New York. In 2003 she received the Award from NY Art Commission for her Lighting Concept at PS 1 – (MoMA) Contemporary Art Museum, New York, for Halie Light & L’Observatoire International Project. In 2004 she founded "H Life Foundation, Inc. for Art, Cultural Heritage and Nature" in New York.

One of the focuses of her work is light in many of its manifestations. She researches and creates symbols, works with natural and light emitting pigments, new media and materials or design.

Among other things she promotes awareness about safety issues and often uses fire blankets and space blankets for her artworks.

She participates in social-ambiental projects and is interested in local cultures, their rituals and tribal organization: Xavantes or A'uwẽ Uptabi in Brazil, Hopi in the US, Mapuche in Cile, Aboriginal Australians, Bantu in Gabon.

Some examples of her site specific multimedia installations in Germany were Pharadise and HHole for Mannheim. HHole was an artistic way of claiming the territory of the museum and "re-directing our vision from the inside to the outside." In 2015, she sued the museum where HHole was installed because the museum was going to cover the holes that she described as art. The court ruled that a hole cannot be construed as art, despite other precedents, like Gordon Matta-Clark's holes drilled in buildings. Braun Barends was compensated for the monetary value of her art. PHaradise was a lighting installation in the dome of the Hermann Biling Building and during the night the light shifts and moves in a way that is reminiscent of breathing.

The German Supreme Court upheld the decisions and ruled, that the removal of the artworks did not infringe her moral rights as artist.

== Architecture ==
1996–2001 – Conception, design and site supervision of the "Hali House de Cirambai" Conceived to be an artist's studio, an optional residence and the future base for the HLife Foundation, Ilhabela, (Beautiful Island) Ponta das Canas, between São Paulo and Rio de Janeiro/Brazil. The house has been officially recognised as an art work by the Brazilian "Ministerio da Cultura".
