= Paolo Bernardi =

Italian professor of pathology

Paolo Bernardi is an Italian professor of pathology who has an h-index of 111 and 48,456 citations of his works. He works at University of Padua in Italy.
