= Ronald L. Barnard =

Bermudian politician (1927–1981)

Ronald Leslie Barnard (24 December 1927 – 13 June 1981) was a Bermudian politician for the United Bermuda Party. He was a president of the Bermuda Bar Association. He was a Rhodes Scholar.
