= Bernt Krebs =

German scientist

- Born: Gotha, Germany,
- Education: University of Göttingen
- Scientific career
- Fields: Inorganic Chemistry
- Workplaces: University of Münster

Bernt Krebs (born in Gotha, Germany) is a German scientist. He is conducting research at the Faculty of Chemistry, University of Münster.

== Academic career ==
After his studies in chemistry at the University of Göttingen from 1958 to 1963 and after his diploma in chemistry in 1963, Bernt Krebs received his Dr. rer.nat. degree in 1965. In 1965 and 1966 he worked as a postdoctoral research fellow at Brookhaven National Laboratory with Walter Hamilton and Don Koenig. After his habilitation in the field of inorganic chemistry at the University of Göttingen he got tenure as a Professor of Inorganic Chemistry at the University of Kiel in 1971. In 1973 he accepted a professorship at the newly founded Bielefeld University, where he successfully established a new chemistry department and new chemistry curricula.

During his full professorship of inorganic chemistry at the University of Münster since 1977, he established his group as an internationally recognized research centre in the field of coordination chemistry, bioinorganic chemistry and structural chemistry. His research covers a broad range of fields ranging from inorganic solid state chemistry, synthetic main group chemistry, biomimetic transition metal complex chemistry for modelling active sites in metalloproteins to metalloenzyme studies, including the isolation and structural characterization by X-ray diffraction analysis. During the 1960s and 1970s he was one of the pioneers in the field of chemical crystallography in Germany. His work in synthesis and spectroscopy involved close cooperation with Achim Müller. He has held guest professorships at the Universities of Stony Brook (US), Strasbourg (France), La Plata (Argentina), Copenhagen/Lyngby (Denmark), and Nagoya (Japan).

Krebs has published more than 750 scientific peer-reviewed papers in international journals; besides a number of review articles, he was editor and co-editor of three books, and he is co-author of 13 patents. He served for several years in leading positions of German and European science organizations, e.g., as a chief referee (IC) for the Deutsche Forschungsgemeinschaft (DFG). Bernt Krebs is an elected member of several academies such as Academia Europaea London, German National Academy of Sciences Leopoldina, Akademie der Wissenschaften und der Literatur Mainz, New York Academy of Sciences, and Academia Nacional de Sciencias Exactas, Fisicas y Naturales, Buenos Aires. Among his several scientific honours are the Max Planck Research Award (1992), the Wilhelm Klemm Award of the German Chemical Society GDCh (1997), the Egon Wiberg Lecture Award (2003), and the honorary doctor degree of the University of Mainz (2006).

== Research ==
Krebs' scientific achievements are centered in the fields of inorganic chemistry, bioinorganic chemistry, and structural chemistry. Starting with his thesis on trithiocarbonic acid and its chemistry, and supported by his profound experience gained during his postdoctoral work at Brookhaven National Laboratory, he was one of the pioneers of chemical crystallography in Germany in the sixties. In this context he was successful in his synthetic investigations on novel polynuclear metal-sulphur compounds, on chalcogen-halogen compounds and on transition metal oxo compounds which were supported by most innovative structural investigations with X-ray and neutron diffraction methods. In the field of physically relevant synthetic solid state chemistry he is internationally known for his pioneering development of boron-chalcogen chemistry. Besides novel binary and ternary boron-sulfur and boron-selenium compounds he developed new ionic conductors on the basis of lithium chalcogenoborates.

His work in bioinorganic chemistry is centered mainly on investigations of the synthesis, structure and function of model compounds for metalloenzymes such as the purple acid phosphatases (iron, zinc), glucose isomerase (cobalt, zinc) and copper type-3 enzymes (catechol oxidase, tyrosinase). These investigations have led to catalytically active models as thermally stable and selective analogues for metalloenzymes. One of the achievements is the establishment of bio-analogous chemosensor systems for the analysis of catecholamines. Further investigations include a large number of mono- and polynuclear sulphur complexes of transition metals such as iron, nickel, cobalt, zinc or molybdenum.

They are significant contributions to the understanding of the function and structure of important metal-sulphur proteins such as ferredoxins, nitrogenases and metallothioneins. An important recent research project concerns the synthesis and practical development of novel platinum complexes as possible antitumor agents. Bernt Krebs was able to develop a number of highly interesting new compounds with promising properties, e.g., without nephrotoxic side effects.

His structural investigations are significant contributions to the understanding of the mechanisms of the interaction of platinum agents with DNA. The contributions of Bernt Krebs to the methods and applications of crystal structure analysis with X-ray and neutron diffraction and to X-ray absorption spectroscopy are outstanding. His pioneering crystal structures of purple acid phosphatase from kidney bean and of catechol oxidase from sweet potatoes have become classical results of metalloenzyme research papers.

== Publications ==
- Krebs, Bernt (1983). "Thio- and Seleno-Compounds of Main Group Elements?Novel Inorganic Oligomers and Polymers". Angewandte Chemie International Edition in English. 22 (2). Wiley: 113–134. doi:10.1002/anie.198301131. ISSN 0570-0833.
- Krebs, Bernt; Henkel, Gerald (1991). "Transition-Metal Thiolates: From Molecular Fragments of Sulfidic Solids to Models for Active Centers in Biomolecules". Angewandte Chemie International Edition in English. 30 (7). Wiley: 769–788. doi:10.1002/anie.199107691. ISSN 0570-0833.
- Sträter, Norbert; Klabunde, Thomas; Tucker, Paul; Witzel, Herbert; Krebs, Bernt (9 June 1995). "Crystal Structure of a Purple Acid Phosphatase Containing a Dinuclear Fe(III)-Zn(II) Active Site". Science. 268 (5216). American Association for the Advancement of Science (AAAS): 1489–1492. Bibcode:1995Sci...268.1489S. doi:10.1126/science.7770774. ISSN 0036-8075. PMID 7770774.
- Sträter, Norbert; Lipscomb, William N.; Klabunde, Thomas; Krebs, Bernt (1 October 1996). "Two-Metal Ion Catalysis in Enzymatic Acyl- and Phosphoryl-Transfer Reactions". Angewandte Chemie International Edition in English. 35 (18). Wiley: 2024–2055. doi:10.1002/anie.199620241. ISSN 0570-0833.
- Klabunde, Thomas; Eicken, Christoph; Sacchettini, James C.; Krebs, Bernt (1998). "Crystal structure of a plant catechol oxidase containing a dicopper center". Nature Structural Biology. 5 (12). Springer Science and Business Media LLC: 1084–1090. doi:10.1038/4193. ISSN 1072-8368. PMID 9846879. S2CID 29946865.

Further publications: see homepage at the University of Münster: Publications list
