= Anne Barnard =

American journalist

Anne Barnard is an American journalist who works for The New York Times. She was its Beirut bureau chief from 2012 to 2018. She was born in New York City, studied at Yale University, and from 1993 to 1995 reported for The Moscow Times. She then worked for The Philadelphia Inquirer from 1996 to 2000, and for The Boston Globe as Baghdad Bureau Chief and Middle East Bureau Chief from 2003 until 2007, when she joined The New York Times.

== Awards ==
In 2011, she received the Mike Berger Award from Columbia University Graduate School of Journalism.
