= Eric Barnard =

British neuroscientist (1927–2018)

Eric Albert Barnard FRS (2 July 1927 – 23 May 2018) was a British neuroscientist, and Professor at University of Cambridge.

He was educated at King's College London (BSc; PhD, 1956). He was a fellow of King's College from 1956–1959 after which he was Assistant Lecturer (1959–1960) and Lecturer (1960–1964). He was an Association Professor of Biochemical Pharmacology at the State University of New York (1964–1965), Professor of Biochemistry (1965–1976) and then Head of the Biochemistry Department (1969–1976). He was appointed Rank Professor of Physiological Biochemistry at Imperial College of Science and Technology in London from 1976 to 1985, acting as Chairman of the Division of Life Sciences (1977–1985) and Head of the Department of Biochemistry (1979–1985).

He was a Rockefeller Fellow at the University of California in 1960–61 and a Guggenheim Fellow at the MRC Laboratory of Molecular Biology at Cambridge. He was elected a Fellow of the Royal Society on 19 March 1981.

He died on 23 May 2018 at the age of 90. He had married Dr Penelope J. Hennessy in 1956.

== Works ==
- A. Burgen; Eric A. Barnard, eds. (1992). Receptor subunits and complexes. Cambridge University Press. ISBN 978-0-521-36612-0.
- Edwin S. Levitan, Peter R. Schofield, David R. Burt, Lucy M. Rhee, William Wisden, Martin Köhler, Norihisa Fujita, Henry F. Rodriguez, Anne Stephenson, Mark G. Darlison, Eric A. Barnard, Peter H. Seeburg, "Structural and functional basis for GABAA receptor heterogeneity", Nature 335, 76 - 79 (1 September 1988); doi:10.1038/335076a0
