= Lisa Bernhard =

American journalist

Lisa Bernhard is a former on-air reporter for the Fox News Channel, working from November 2003 until May 2007. She served as Entertainment Correspondent, covering film, music, television, celebrity news, and other aspects of the entertainment industry.

Before joining FNC, Bernhard was the deputy editor for TV Guide where she covered major entertainment stories and conducted numerous celebrity interviews, including sit-downs with Ellen DeGeneres, Paul McCartney, and Michael Jackson. Most notably, Bernhard oversaw the magazine's stand-alone issue, “This Is Elvis,” which marked the 25th anniversary of Elvis Presley's death. While at TV Guide, Bernhard also made numerous appearances on the Today Show, The View, and Access Hollywood, among others.

Prior to TV Guide, Bernhard was a correspondent for E!’s Gossip Show and also had stints with Romance Classics, Total TV, and The Cable Guide. She began her journalism career as an intern for Rolling Stone magazine and later served as an assistant editor at Us magazine. She has a B.A. in political science from Colgate University.
