= Vanessa Behrendt =

German politician (born 1984)

Member of the Landtag of Lower Saxony
- Incumbent
- Assumed office 8 November 2022

Personal details
- Born: 14 May 1984 (age 42)
- Party: Alternative for Germany

Vanessa Behrendt (born 14 May 1984) is a German politician serving as a member of the Landtag of Lower Saxony since 2022. She is the spokesperson for family, women's, children's and youth policy of the Alternative for Germany group in the Landtag.
