= Stefan Bernhard =

American chemist

Professor Stefan Bernhard
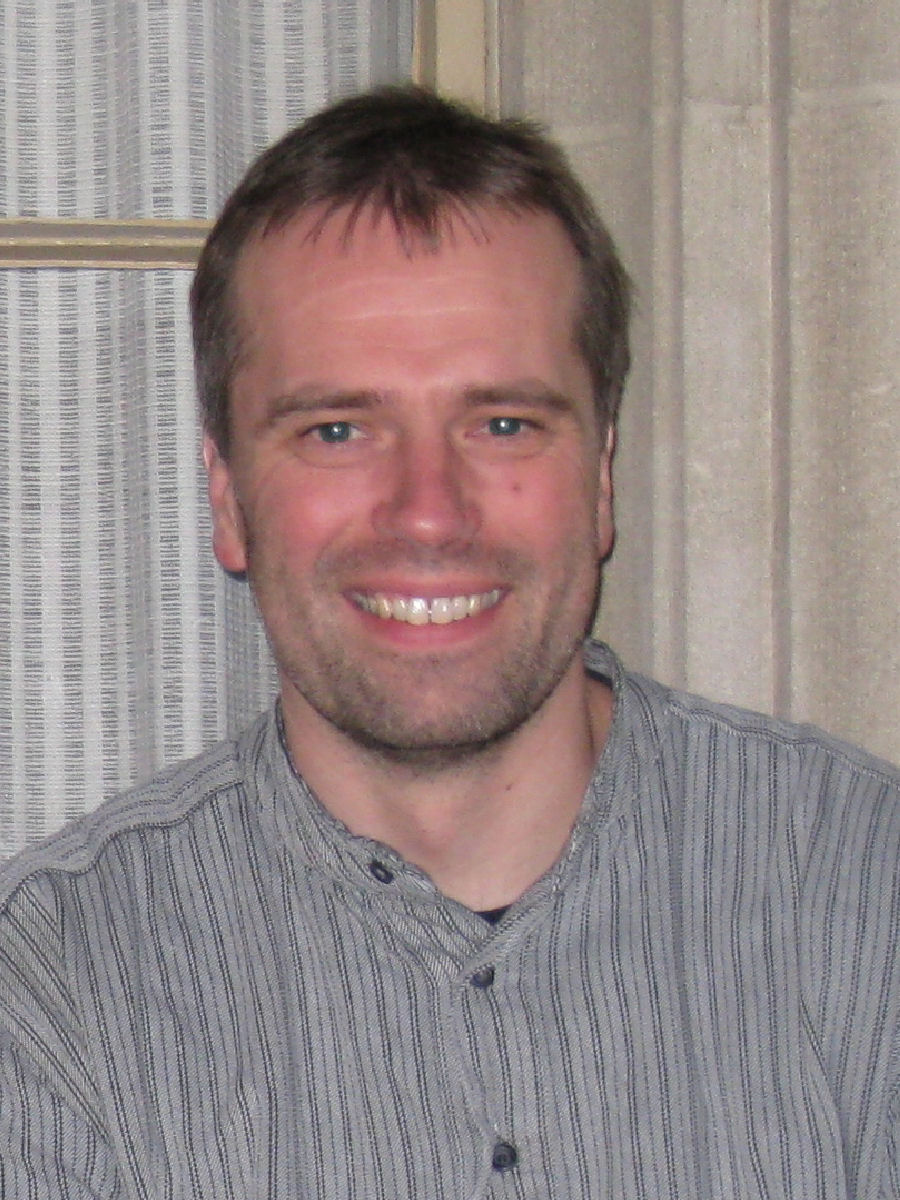
- Bernhard, January 2009
- Born: June 2, 1966 (age 60); Bern, Switzerland

Stefan Bernhard (born 1966) is a Swiss scientist who has worked in fields related to the interaction between light and transition metal complexes. His involvement in the prediction, generation, and spectroscopy of circularly polarized luminescence from synthesized chiral phosphors have significantly advanced the state-of-the-art in this relatively young sub-field of photophysical chemistry. Other contributions involve work in artificial photosynthesis and organic light-emitting diodes.

== Contributions ==
Circularly Polarized Luminescence Spectroscopy (CPL)

Capable of measuring dissymmetry factors of even weakly luminescent materials to within a reported error as small as 10^{−6}, the home-built CPL spectrometer created and used by the Bernhard lab is more sensitive than any previously demonstrated CPL spectrometer. In addition, it was shown that CPL dissymmetry factors can be predicted computationally over a diverse sampling of known luminophore architectures, validating a new and facile tool for directing synthetic efforts in the search for anisotropic emitters.

Artificial photosynthesis

Efforts in this field have focused on solution-based water photolysis. Breaking the problem into smaller components, the Bernhard lab has distinguished its efforts in photosensitization, water photoreduction catalysis, and water oxidation catalysis. These contributions consist primarily of advancement beyond prior art in catalyst longevity and electronic control.

Organic light emitting devices

The primary outcome of work in this field has been ionic transition metal complex devices with improved turn-on times, achieved by A) employing ionic liquids, or B) attaching cationic tails of varying lengths to the luminophores.

== Education ==
- Lab Technician Apprenticeship (1982-1985) at Suchard Tobler Chocolates
- Diploma in Chemical Engineering (1985-1988) from the School of Engineering in Burgdorf, Switzerland
- Diploma in Chemistry (1988-1993) from the University of Fribourg, Switzerland
- Doctorate of Philosophy in Chemistry (1993-1996) from the University of Fribourg for "synthesis and properties of adamantane bridged diimine ligands and their Ru(II) and Os(II) complexes" under Prof. Dr. Peter Belser
- Postdoctoral Research Associate (1996-1998) at Los Alamos National Laboratory under Dr. Jon Schoonover. Supported by fellowships from the Swiss National Science Foundation and the Novartis Foundation
- Postdoctoral Research Associate (1998-2002) at Cornell University under Prof. Dr. Héctor D. Abruña. Supported by the Swiss National Science Foundation Fellowship for Advanced Researchers

== Career ==
- Assistant Professorship (2002-2009) in the Department of Chemistry at Princeton University. During this assignment, Prof. Dr. Bernhard was awarded A) the Dreyfus New Faculty award, B) the NSF Career award, and C) Princeton's graduate mentoring award, as well as endorsement for promotion from Princeton's existing chemistry faculty.
- Associate Professorship (2009-present) in the Department of Chemistry at Carnegie Mellon University.

== Collaborations ==
- George Malliaras, Cornell University
- Craig Arnold, Princeton University
- Marcella Bonchio, University of Padova
- Lynn Loo, Princeton University
- Martin Albrecht, UC Dublin
