= Kathryn Barnard =

- Born: April 16, 1938
- Died: June 27, 2015 (aged 77)
- Education: University of Nebraska; Boston University; University of Washington
- Known for: mother-newborn interactions in early childhood development

Kathryn Elaine Barnard (April 16, 1938 – June 27, 2015) was an American nurse and researcher in pediatrics. She is known for her discovery of the role mother-newborn interactions have in early childhood development.

== Early life and education ==
Barnard was born and raised in Omaha, Nebraska, and attended the University of Nebraska for her undergraduate nursing education, graduating in 1960. She attended Boston University for her postgraduate study, graduating in 1963 with a master's degree in nursing. She then moved to the University of Washington for her doctorate, which she earned in 1972 with a dissertation on the role of rocking in infant development.

== Career and research ==
Her doctoral research began a lifelong study of early childhood development. Barnard's research focused on the mother-child relationship, especially with regards to neonates. She discovered that rocking chairs and listening to heartbeats could help infants; this research caused hospitals to install rocking chairs in labor and delivery and neonatal units. Her parent-child interaction scale was invented to show the effect that these interactions could have on development in various realms. Barnard is responsible for founding Nursing Child Assessment Satellite Training (NCAST), which offers evidence based training programs to both parent and health care provider. Through the NCAST program, the Parent-Child Interaction Feeding and Teaching Scales (PCI) evolved. It was the first parent-child interaction tool in clinical research and continues to be the gold standard in practice today to determine a child's cognitive development. She was part of the team that invented the isolette, a neonatal incubator that rocks in order to support sensorimotor development and weight gain. Her research also showed that physical contact was essential for infant development. Her research also included interventions for children who were at risk of future problems due to their environment.

Barnard ended her career as an emerita professor at the University of Washington.

== Honors and awards ==
Barnard received numerous awards for her work:

- Gustav O. Leinhard Award, 2002
- Episteme Award, American Academy of Nursing
- Living Legend Award, American Academy of Nursing (2006)
- Lucille Petry Leone Award for Teaching
- M. Scott Award for Contributions to Nursing Science
- Martha May Eliot Award for Leadership in Maternal-Child Health
- Nurse Scientist of the Year Award

== Legacy ==
The Center on Infant Mental Health and Development, founded by Barnard in 2001, continues research at the University of Washington and is now named for her. She was a founder of Zero to Three, an early-childhood nonprofit organization. Barnard died from chronic illnesses at the age of 77.
