= Donny Barnard =

English footballer

Personal information
- Full name: Donny Gary Barnard
- Date of birth: 1 July 1984 (age 42)
- Place of birth: Forest Gate, England
- Positions: Right back; midfielder

Team information
- Current team: Harlow Town

Youth career
- Leyton Orient

Senior career*
Years	Team	Apps	(Gls)
2001–2007	Leyton Orient	135	(1)
2007	Grays Athletic	4	(0)
2007–2009	Hornchurch	?	(?)
2009–2010	Tilbury	?	(?)
2010–2011	Harlow Town	?	(?)
2011	Hornchurch	?	(?)
2011–	Harlow Town	?	(?)
- * Club domestic league appearances and goals as of 22:52, 4 November 2011 (UTC)

Donny Gary Barnard (born 1 July 1984) is an English professional footballer who plays for Harlow Town.

== Career ==
Barnard came up through the youth ranks at Leyton Orient, and wore the #2 and previously #23 shirt. He was reduced to mainly a substitute place for much of the seasons that he was part of the Leyton Orient first team squad. He was a utility player, who could play at right back, left back or in midfield. He was released at the end of the 2006–07 season and signed for Grays Athletic.

He was released from Grays Athletic on 26 September 2007 and signed for AFC Hornchurch in October the same year.

In November 2009 Barnard joined Tilbury and has been a regular in the first team squad.

Barnard was released by Tilbury in the summer of 2010 and joined Harlow Town in the Isthmian League Division One North.
