= Aertirrena =

- Founded: 1966
- Commenced operations: 1966
- Ceased operations: 1975
- Operating bases: Florence-Peretola Airport
- Fleet size: 3 Yakovlev Yak-40
- Headquarters: Florence
- Key people: Alfredo Persoglio, President Giorgio Billi, Vice President A. Benzi, General Manager

Aertirrena S.p.A. was a regional airline of Italy, active in early 1970s. It operated passenger services to domestic destinations. It was one of the few Italian airlines which operated Soviet-built aircraft.

== History ==
‘’’Aertirrena’’’ was founded on April 14, 1966, by entrepreneur Giorgio Billi, a pilot (he owned a civilianized American P-51 "Mustang" fighter) and a passionate aviation enthusiast. It had registered offices firstly in Pisa and in 1970s in Rome. Its main base was Florence-Peretola airport. The first flights began in June of that year, all air taxis or small charters. The fleet consisted primarily of Beechcraft Queen Airs, a Beechcraft Baron, and two Piper PA-23s

The first regular flights began the following year, connecting Florence with Genoa and Elba Island on a seasonal basis. In 1968, a seasonal route between Milan and Elba was inaugurated, while in 1969, a seasonal route between Rome and Elba was launched. These flights were almost always operated by Britten Norman BN.2 Islanders.

The purchase of the H.P. 137 Jetstream in 1967, for which Aertirrena was the Italian representative, was never completed. Instead, in 1969, the company bought Soviet-built Yakovlev Yakovlev Yak-40s, which could carry up to 32 passengers and were suitable for the scheduled routes from Florence to Milan and Rome. The Soviet aircraft were obtained through an unusual "swap" between textile machinery from Billi's company and the three-engine jetliners produced in the Saratov city factory and marketed by Aviaexport. These aircraft featured somewhat backward technology but were extremely robust and capable of operating from dirt or grass runways.

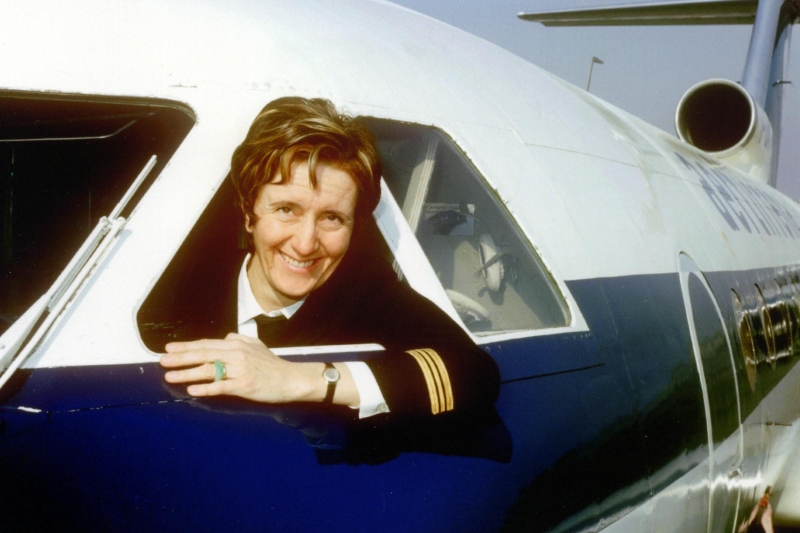
Fiorenza de Bernardi, first female commercial pilot from Italy, in the cockpit of Yakovlev Yak-40 I-JAKA

From 1972, experimental flights were carried out between Florence and Milan, Florence and Rome (Ciampino), Florence and Elba Island, and Bolzano and Rome. The company, however, began to experience operational problems (replacement of all avionics with Western-made equipment, lengthy certification process) and delays in obtaining authorization to open regular routes.

In the meanwhile the two aircraft were leased to the Greek flag carrier Olympic Airways for operational evaluation, as Aertirrena was the representative of the Yak 40s in the Mediterranean area. The energy crisis which followed the Yom Kippur War depleted the company's resources. All the accumulated problems led to the cessation of operations on April 8, 1974, and to liquidation in 1975. The entire company and the Yak 40s were acquired by Avioligure.

Aertirrena was noticeable as it was the first Italian airline to employ a female pilot, Fiorenza de Bernardi.

== Frequent destinations ==
- Albenga
- Elba Island
- Florence
- Genoa
- Milan
- Pisa
- Rome

== Fleet ==
Aertirrena fleet consisted of the following aircraft, in order of delivery:

Aircraft type	Total	In service	Struck off	Remarks
Piper PA-23	2	1966	1971	I-MIMA/RAPI
Beechcraft Baron A55	1	1966	1971	I-VICO
Beechcraft Queen Air 80	2	1966	1975	I-SARG/SARU
Britten Norman BN.2 Islander	2	1967	1971	I-TRAL/TRAM
Yakovlev Yak-40	3	1970	1975	I-JAKA on operational lease 1970–1971 I-JAKE and I-JAKI in service from 1972
Swearingen Metroliner SA-226	1	1971	1972	I-PEBI

== See also ==
- List of defunct airlines of Italy
