= Johannes Berendt =

German journalist (born 1981)

Johannes Berendt (born 1981 in Germany) has been a syndicated columnist (during the 2006 FIFA World Cup and beyond) and the German correspondent for the football radio show World Soccer Daily.
