= Fiorenza de Bernardi =

Italian pilot (1928–2025)

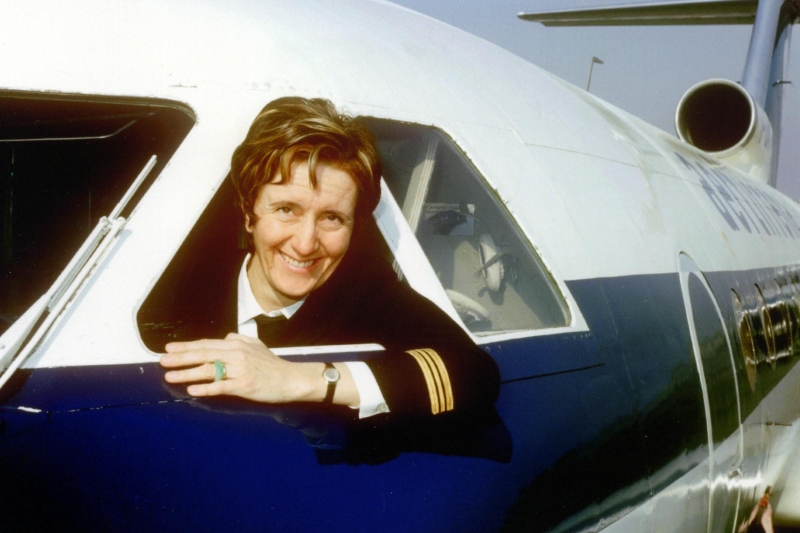
- de Bernardi on board a Yak-40 in 1975
- Born: 22 May 1928; Florence, Italy
- Died: 6 December 2025 (aged 97)
- Occupation: Aviator

Fiorenza de Bernardi (22 May 1928 – 6 December 2025) was Italy's first woman commercial airline pilot, and one of the founders of the airline Aertirrena.

== Life and career ==
De Bernardi was born in Florence on 22 May 1928, to Mario de Bernardi, a colonel of the Royal Italian Air Force.

She acquired her first three licenses in 1951 and was hired in 1967 by the airline Aeralps by employer General Garetto.

In the 1960s, she received her glider pilot certificate. She was the first woman in Italy to receive a glacier pilot certificate.

She founded the airline Aertirrena in 1966 along with Piotr Ivanov, an Aeroflot employee. During her time as a pilot, she was experienced in flying the Twin Otter, Yak-40, and the DC-8 to a total of more than 6,500 hours.

She was then president of the Association of Women in the Air (ADA). She was also vice-president of the European Pilot Federation and a member of the Ninety-Nines (an association to which all the world's women pilots belong) and was one of the members of the ISA (International Association of Airline Pilots). She was forced to retire earlier than expected, following a car accident.

De Bernardi died on 6 December 2025, at the age of 97.
