= John Barnard (music publisher) =

English cleric, musician and music publisher

John Barnard (fl. 1625–1649), English musician, was a minor canon of St Paul's Cathedral in the reign of Charles I.

He was the first to publish a collection of English cathedral music. It contains some of the finest 16th-century masterpieces, ranging from the "faux-bourdon" style of Thomas Tallis's Preces and Responses to the most developed types of full anthem. The text, however, is not trustworthy.
