= J. Lynn Barnard =

American football coach

Biographical details
- Born: August 9, 1867; Milford, New York, U.S.
- Died: 1941 (aged 73–74); Binghamton, New York, U.S.
- Education: Syracuse (BS, 1892); Penn (Ph.D., 1897)

Coaching career (HC unless noted)
- 1900: Ursinus

Head coaching record
- Overall: 4–6

James Lynn Barnard (August 9, 1867 – 1941) was an American football coach and college faculty member. He served as the head football coach at Ursinus College in Collegeville, Pennsylvania in 1900, compiling a record of 4–6, while a member of the school's political science and history faculty.

He had previously been an instructor of political economy at Epworth Seminary in Epworth, Iowa and later worked in the Pennsylvania Department of Public Instruction in Harrisburg, Pennsylvania.

== Head coaching record ==
Year	Team	Overall	Conference	Standing	Bowl/playoffs
Ursinus (Independent) (1900)
1900	Ursinus	4–6			
Ursinus:		4–6			
Total:		4–6			
