= Danny Bernardi =

British writer

Danny Bernardi is a writer of contemporary fiction and short stories. He was born in Birmingham, in 1966. After his secondary education he went on to study drama at Bretton Hall College (now Bretton Hall University College) under John Hodgson (Head of Drama) where Bernardi was encouraged by him to develop his writing.

== Focus ==
Initially focussing on playwriting but increasingly frustrated by its limitations, Bernardi eventually turned towards the short story and flash fiction forms, gaining modest success with works appearing in several literary magazines and on various new writing websites, including:'Open Wide Magazine', The Birmingham Post, 'Writers Muse Magazine', and 'Footeps to Oxford'.

== Personal Writing ==
His debut novel 'Under the and demons.

The novel has been described as a tale of impermanence, renewal and hope written in a visceral, contemporary and humorous style. Bernardi's dialogue is invariably highlighted as being realistic and uncompromising whilst the sense of place he manages to evoke in setting his first novel in Birmingham provides a gritty backdrop to the action. The city itself has almost become an additional character in most of his works to date and the recent radical changes in its economy, built environment and cultural landscape are often reflected through the narrative strands present in Bernardi's writing. Although Bernardi is obviously fond of his native city as well as proud of the spirit and humour of its people, he is however not blinded by regional pride and is often critical of the inertia and lack of vision embedded within the institutional structures of Birmingham (... all Birmingham wants to do is sleep, sic).

Under the Rotunda Meadow Books 14 June 2006 ISBN 1-84685-184-X

== Influences ==
Bernardi has cited his main influences on his writing as being the Egyptian Nobel Laureate Naguib Mahfouz, playwrights such as Steven Berkoff and Samuel Beckett (1906–1989) as well as such diverse sources such as The Clash, Billy Childish, Benjamin Zephaniah.
