= Mildred Barnard =

Australian biometrician, mathematician and statistician

- Born: 5 August 1908; Melbourne, Victoria, Australia
- Died: 9 March 2000 (aged 91); Brisbane, Queensland, Australia
- Education: University of Melbourne; University College London
- Scientific career
- Workplaces: University of Melbourne; Council for Scientific and industrial Research; University of Queensland

Mildred Macfarlan Barnard (also known as Mildred Macfarlan Prentice, 5 August 1908 – 9 March 2000) was an Australian biometrician, mathematician and statistician.

== Early life and education ==
Barnard was born in Melbourne on 5 August 1908. Her mother, Jessie Margaret Barnard, helped found the Federal Territory War Food Fund. Her father, Robert James Allman Barnard, became a foundation professor of mathematics at the Royal Military College, Duntroon near Canberra, where the family moved in 1911. They returned to Melbourne in the 1920s, when Barnard's father took a position as senior lecturer at the University of Melbourne.

Barnard entered the University of Melbourne in 1927. She won a Dixson Scholarship in 1930, the same year that she completed a B.A. with honours in mathematics. She added a B.S. in physics in 1931 and an M.S. in 1932. Her master's thesis concerned the continuum mechanics of a cracked thin plate, and was supervised by John Henry Michell.

In search of a subject that would bring her into more contact with other people, and discouraged by the job prospects for mathematicians and physicists in Australia, Barnard shifted her interests to biometrics. She began her doctoral studies in statistics with Ronald Fisher in the Galton Laboratory at University College London in 1934. She published three papers in this period, on craniometry, factorial experiments, and environmental statistics, and completed her Ph.D. in 1936.

== Career and later life ==
After completing her education, Barnard returned to Australia and became an assistant biometrician in the Division of Forest Products of the Council for Scientific and Industrial Research, beginning in 1936. Although centred at Melbourne, her position also involved spending time in Canberra and Sydney. While at CSIR she worked with Betty Allan. Topics that Barnard researched were the 'holding power of coach screws and the serviceability of railway sleepers and telegraph poles'. In the normal course of events, she would have lost the position when she married in 1939, but the outbreak of World War II, and the need for wood in airplanes, caused greater demands on her office, so her resignation was delayed until the birth of her first child in 1941.

While raising a family, she lectured part-time at the University of Melbourne until she and her family moved to Brisbane, where her husband found a position as professor of electrical engineering at the University of Queensland. She continued her part-time lecturing there and, in 1970, she was appointed as lecturer in mathematical statistics at the University of Queensland.

In 1972 she became the first Chairwoman (1972) of the Brisbane Branch of the International Biometric Society, Australasian Region.

She died in Brisbane on 9 March 2000.

== Book ==
Barnard's book Elementary Statistics for Use in Timber Research (with Neil Ditchburn, CSIRO, 1956) was published after being printed twice for CSIRO use.
