= Bernardino Blaceo =

Italian painter

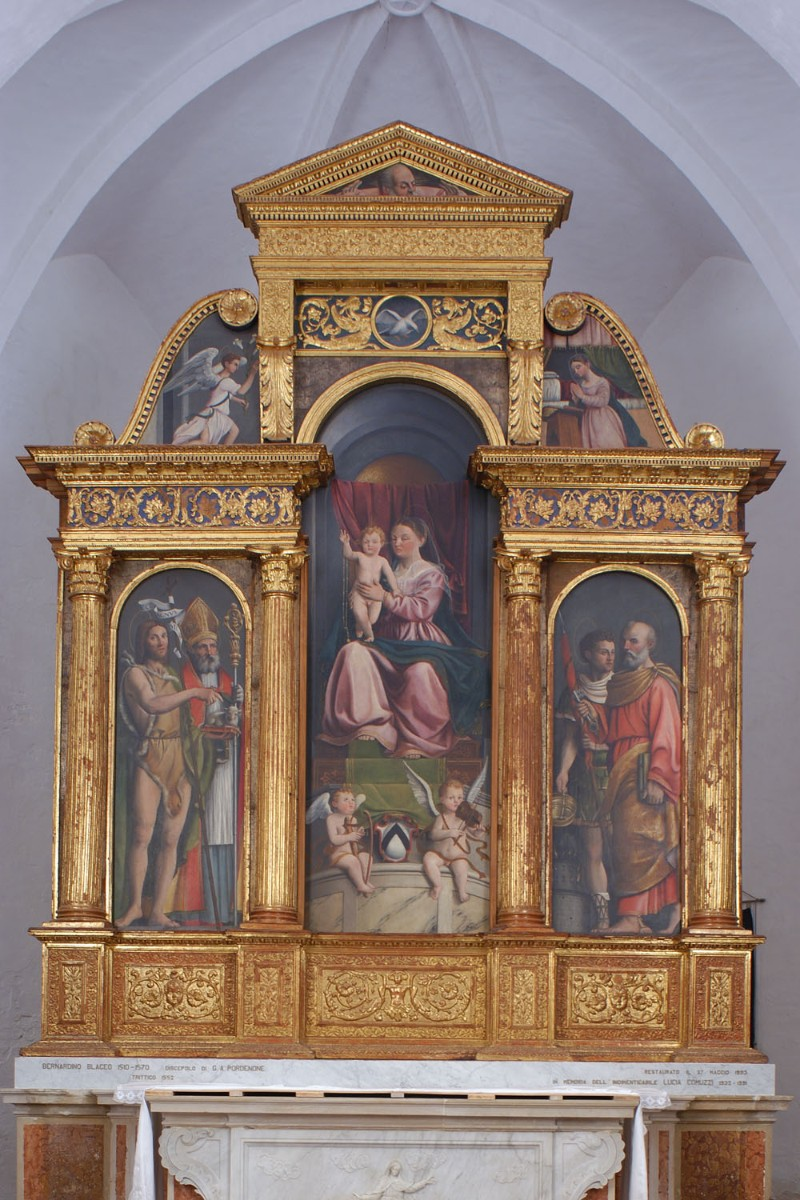
Bernardino Blaceo, Triptych (1552) with Madonna and Child (centre), Saint John and Saint Hermagoras (left), Saint Peter and Saint Florian (right), Church of the Blessed Virgin of the Rosary, Rivignano Teor

Bernardino Blaceo (died 23 June 1570) was an Italian painter of the Renaissance period, active c. 1550 in his hometown Udine and in Friuli. His first dated work was a fresco Virgin and infant with Saints Peter and John from 1540 for a house in the Porta Nuova district, destroyed sometime after 1839. His most important work was the principal altarpiece Virgin and child, with Angels and Saints Lucia and Agatha for the church of Santa Lucia, completed in 1554. It was rediscovered in 1963 in the Civic Museum of Padua.
