= Bernt Petersen =

Danish furniture designer

Bernt Petersen (1937 – 6 March 2017), often known simply as Bernt, was a Danish furniture designer. Trained as a cabinetmaker (1957), he attended Denmark's Design School, graduating in 1960. He then worked for Molibia and Hans J. Wegner before opening his own studio in 1963. He taught at Denmark's Design School (1973–78) and was lector at the Royal Danish Academy's Furniture School (1978–85). Bernt's furniture designs were mainly in light wood such as ash and beech. Some of his pieces have been used in theaters and concert halls in towns throughout Denmark. Petersen was recognized for his simple style which is suitable for industrial production. He died on 6 March 2017 at the age of 79.

One of his finest pieces is a small, light stool (1959), in rosewood and cane, with beautifully shaped legs.

== See also ==
- Danish modern
- Danish design
