= Joseph Edwin Barnard =

British scientist (1868/70–1949)

Barnard in 1926.

Joseph Edwin Barnard (Note: He usually published as J. E. Barnard, occasionally as J. Edwin Barnard; some literature refers to him as Edwin Barnard.) (7 December 1868/70 – 25 October 1949) was a British microscopist and businessman known for his refinements to the ultraviolet microscope and for taking early photomicrographs of viruses, including ectromelia virus, foot-and-mouth disease virus and vesicular stomatitis virus. In a widely publicised paper of 1925 he published images of supposed viruses isolated from various avian and mammalian tumours, but the results could not be replicated by others and he did not publish on the topic again. He headed the department of applied optics at the National Institute for Medical Research on an honorary part-time basis, while carrying out his business as a hatter, from 1920 until his retirement during the Second World War. He was an elected fellow of the Institute of Physics (1923) and the Royal Society (1924), and an honorary member of the Royal Microscopical Society (1948), of which he was president three times. His Practical Photo-micrography (1911) was a standard textbook in the field.

== Education and career ==
Barnard was born on 7 December in either 1868 or 1870 in Pimlico, London, to Elizabeth Phillips (née Jacob) and Walter Barnard, a London hatter with a shop on Jermyn Street. (Note: His obituary for the Royal Society gives his father's name as J. Barnard.) He attended the City of London School, where he was head boy, until he was sixteen, when he joined the family business. It was a profitable enterprise, and towards the end of the century he had both the leisure and the means to pursue his early interest in microscopy and taking photomicrographs, equipping a laboratory at his house. He was elected a fellow of the Royal Microscopical Society in 1895, exhibited at a Royal Society conversazione in 1897, and published his first research papers the following year. From around 1899, he worked part-time at the Jenner Institute for Preventive Medicine (later the Lister Institute). He held an honorary lecturership in microscopy at King's College, London in 1909–25.

During the First World War, as part of his work for the War Office's Trench Fever Committee (from around 1916), he personally equipped a laboratory at Charing Cross Hospital Medical School, later gaining an assistant, Frank V. Welch, who became a long-term collaborator. In 1920, Barnard became head of the new department of applied optics at the National Institute for Medical Research in Hampstead (briefly later at Mill Hill), a post he held until retirement due to ill health during the Second World War. He worked part-time on a volunteer basis, with only an honorarium towards his expenses, and continued to pursue his hatmaking business; W. J. Purdy speculates that this was to maintain his ability to direct his own research. Barnard's collaborators included Welch, John Smiles and W. E. Gye.

== Research ==
=== Technological work ===
Barnard worked for many years, from around 1912, on improving the ultraviolet microscope. This had been invented by August Köhler and Moritz von Rohr at the Carl Zeiss company in Germany in 1903, and the following year Köhler and von Rohr published a paper on taking photomicrographs using ultraviolet microscopy. Ultraviolet, with its shorter wavelength than visible light, has the potential to improve resolution, but the original microscope had been little used. Barnard invented the duplex condenser to replace the original fluorescent screen in 1924, allowing the use of both visible light (from a mercury-vapour lamp) and ultraviolet light (originally from a cadmium spark, and later also from a mercury-vapour lamp), and later invented a way of switching between objectives designed for the two light sources. This allowed the microscope to be focused in the normal fashion using light, and then photomicrographs to be taken using ultraviolet. J. A. Murray, in his obituary for the Royal Society, calls this innovation a "revolution in this field of microscopy" facilitating the production of "accurate, sharp images". In 1930 Barnard designed, with Smiles, a cone condenser or cone illuminator permitting dark-ground photomicrographs using ultraviolet. An ultraviolet microscope of his design was sold by Conrad Beck from 1929. Barnard's modifications were described in 1940 as rendering taking photomicrographs using ultraviolet "relatively easy". In addition to the increased resolution, ultraviolet microscopy had the advantage of allowing living bacteria and eukaryotic cells to be observed and photographed, without needing to use stains (which killed the cells).

He earlier invented a photomicrographic device for use with standard optical microscopes, completed in 1911 and manufactured commercially. He also invented a grinding apparatus in 1911 that allowed bacteria and tissue to be broken up without needing to use chemicals or abrasive materials, which could be used for making bacterial endotoxin preparations.

=== Biological research ===
Barnard's early biological publications were on bioluminescence in bacteria. From 1916 he studied trench fever, now known to be a bacterial disease, using ultraviolet microscopy, observing particles in serum samples that he believed to represent the causative organism. He photographed the causative agent of bovine pleuropneumonia, a small bacterium (Mycoplasma mycoides) then considered to be an organism intermediate between viruses and bacteria. From 1936 he studied fluorescence in micro-organisms under ultraviolet light.

From 1920 he studied "filterable viruses", which were then poorly understood. He demonstrated with ultraviolet microscopy that some infectious agents that passed through bacteria-retaining filters could be visualised microscopically, so demonstrating that these agents are simply small micro-organisms. He photographed the inclusion bodies in cells infected with ectromelia virus, a poxvirus of mice, and showed that they contained particles similar to the infectious agent. He also photographed many other viruses including foot-and-mouth disease virus and vesicular stomatitis virus. In 1925 he published a paper in The Lancet purporting to show viruses derived from tumours of chickens and mammals, in association with another paper in the same journal by W. E. Gye; both built on earlier research by the American researcher Peyton Rous. The general opinion of the scientific community at this date was hostile to the notion that cancer could be caused by viruses or other infectious agents. The two papers were widely reported (Note: For example, Current History, Nature, New York Times, Popular Science Monthly, Science, Scientific American and The Times) and generated considerable public interest, but subsequent research failed to replicate their results, and Barnard did not pursue this line of research further.

He also initiated work on using standardised collodion membranes with known pore sizes to investigate viruses and other micro-organisms by filtration, later carried out in his department by W. J. Elford.

== Writing ==
He published Practical Photo-micrography in 1911, which became a standard textbook; two subsequent editions, co-authored with Welch, came out in 1925 and 1936.

== Awards and societies ==
Barnard was an elected fellow of the Institute of Physics (1923) and of the Royal Society (1924), and an honorary member of the Royal Microscopical Society (1948), of which he was president three times (1918–19, 1928–29 and 1938–45). He was a founder member of the Photomicrographic Society, twice served as its president (1915–16 and 1920–21), and gave a medal which bore his name.

== Personal life ==
Barnard was married twice. In 1894 he married Amelia Muir Cunningham Burge (1867/8–1923), whose father was a hatter. After her death he married Daisy Fisher (Note: His obituary for the Royal Society gives his second wife's maiden name as Welch.) (born 1892/3), whose father worked in the sheet metal industry, in 1924; they had a daughter and a son. His recreations included photography and playing the organ.

He died on 25 October 1949 at Addiscombe in Surrey.

== Selected publications ==
Book

- Practical Photo-micrography (Edward Arnold; 1911, 1925, 1936; later editions co-authored with Frank V. Welch)

Research papers

- J. E. Barnard (1931). The causative organism in infectious ectromelia. Proceedings of the Royal Society B: Biological Sciences 109 (763): 360–74 doi:10.1098/rspb.1931.0088
- J. E. Barnard (1925). The microscopical examination of filterable viruses: associated with malignant new growths. The Lancet 206 (5316): 117–23 doi:10.1016/S0140-6736(01)17183-7
