= John Behrent =

New Zealand cricketer (1938–2024)

Personal information
- Full name: John David Behrent
- Born: 5 July 1938; Auckland, New Zealand
- Died: 5 March 2024 (aged 85); Auckland, New Zealand
- Batting: Right-handed
- Bowling: Right-arm medium

Domestic team information
- Years: Team
- 1959/60: Wellington
- 1963/64–1967/68: Auckland

Career statistics
Competition	First-class
Matches	14
Runs scored	308
Batting average	15.40
100s/50s	0/2
Top score	74
Balls bowled	1,663
Wickets	17
Bowling average	35.94
5 wickets in innings	0
10 wickets in match	0
Best bowling	3/35
Catches/stumpings	16/–
- Source: CricInfo, 10 March 2024

John David Behrent (5 July 1938 – 5 March 2024) was a New Zealand cricketer. He played first-class cricket for Auckland and Wellington between 1959 and 1968.

Behrent died in Auckland on 5 March 2024, at the age of 85.
