= Sidney Barnard =

English footballer (1914–1999)

Personal information
- Full name: Sidney Barnard
- Date of birth: 10 July 1914
- Place of birth: Aigburth, Liverpool, England
- Date of death: 1999 (aged 85)
- Place of death: Liverpool, England
- Position: Inside right

Senior career*
Years	Team	Apps	(Gls)
- Aigburth Parish Church
1934–1935	Blackburn Rovers	0	(0)
1935	Stockport County	0	(0)
1935–1937	Bangor City		
1937–1939	Wrexham	2	(1)
- * Club domestic league appearances and goals

Sidney Barnard (10 July 1914 – 1999) was an English professional footballer who played as an inside right. He made appearances in the English Football League for Wrexham.
