= John Bernhard =

Swiss American artist and photographer

- Born: 17 May 1957 (age 69); Geneva, Switzerland
- Known for: Photography, visual arts
- Website: www.johnbernhard.net

John Bernhard (born May 17, 1957, Geneva, Switzerland) is a Swiss American artist and photographer best known for his surrealist nude studies. Rather than merely showing women's bodies, Bernhard overlaid elements of the earth through projections and worked with myths of metamorphosis as a subtext for his model photography. The resulting images include allusions to the material by which the models are absorbed or into which they disappear.

== Work ==
Bernhard's work was included in the 120 year survey of the nude exhibition "Body Work" at the Minneapolis Institute of Arts, alongside the work of Edward Weston, Bill Brandt, Eadweard Muybridge, E. J. Bellocq, and Edward Steichen. Bernhard later continued to devote all his energy taking photographs and bringing them together to enhance their meaning with visual interplay. This is evident in his "Diptychs" and sequencing series "Drift".

His first non-fiction book, America's Call, an engaging road trip memoir, was published in 2011 by Dog Ear Publishing. The French version L'Appel de L'Amérique, illustrated with 57 color photographs and collages, was published in 2013 by Infolio Edition, Switzerland. America's Call is based on the journal that John Bernhard kept, chronicling his trip to North America during the late 1970s. The theme resonates with the book On the Road by Jack Kerouac, and makes you yearn for traveling across a nostalgic time. Houston Chronicle journalist K. Pica Kahn wrote: "Bernhard's way of storytelling takes the audience on the ride of a lifetime with a mélange of experiences like a colorful ribbon in the sky."

He was profiled in the documentary show "Temps Present" on Swiss Television TSR (Switzerland) and the global network TV5 Monde. His work is widely published and exhibited throughout the U.S. and Europe. His photographs are collected by many museums including the Museum of Fine Arts, Houston; Akron Art Museum, Ohio; Denver Art Museum; Musée de l'Élysée, Official site Lausanne, Switzerland; Museet for Fotokunst, Official site Denmark; the New Mexico Museum of Art; The Ashley Gibson Barnett Museum of Art, (formerly, the Polk Museum of Art), Florida and the Swiss National Library, Bern. His work was shown in 2004 as a major mid-career retrospective exhibition at the Musée des Suisses dans le monde in Geneva. Since 2014, John Bernhard has served as the publisher and editor-in-chief of ArtHouston magazine. His debut novel, Drift of Fate, published by ArtPub, was released in 2024. This first work of fiction delves into the profound depths of human existence, exploring themes of love and destiny. His latest literary venture, Short Stories, followed in 2025. It includes his first novella, The Woman Who Stayed Behind, a haunting tale of unexpected passion and danger set along the forgotten coast of Guatemala. John Bernhard lives and works in Houston, Texas.

== Published books ==
- Short Stories, Published by ArtPub, 2025, ISBN 979-8-285823-56-8
- Drift of Fate, Published by ArtPub, 2024, ISBN 978-1-964422-01-5
- Dreamlike Art & Deviation, Published by ArtPub, 2018, ISBN 978-0-692046-85-2
- 30 Years Bernhard, Published by ArtPub, 2014, ISBN 978-0-967328-68-3
- L'Appel de l'Amérique, Published by Infolio, 2013, ISBN 978-2-884746-81-6
- America's Call, Published by Dog Ear Publishing, 2011, ISBN 978-1-457500-00-8
- Body Work, Published by Elite Editions, 2009, ISBN 978-0-974902-23-4
- China, Published by Elite Editions, 2008, ISBN 978-0-974902-22-7
- Drift, Introduction Shannon Raspberry, Published by Elite Editions, 2006, ISBN 0-974902-21-7
- John Bernhard - A Retrospective, Preface by William Ewing, Published by Editions de Penthes, 2004, ISBN 2-970039-53-2
- Diptych, Published by Elite Editions, 2004, ISBN 0-974902-20-9
- Nicaragua, Published by The Nicaraguan Children Texas Benefit Fund, 2002, ISBN 0-971911-60-6
- Nudes Metamorphs, Published by Emco Press, 2000, ISBN 0-967328-61-6

== Collections ==
Work by the artist is held in the public collections of various museums, including: Akron Art Museum, Akron, Ohio; Amon Carter Museum of American Art, Fort Worth, Texas; Bibliothèque nationale de France, Paris, France; Centro de la Imagen, Mexico City, Mexico; Denver Art Museum, Denver, Colorado; Harry Ransom Center at the University of Texas, Austin, Texas; International Cultural Center ICASALS, Texas Tech University, Lubbock, Texas; Minneapolis Institute of Art, Minneapolis, Minnesota; Musée de l'Élysée, Lausanne, Switzerland; Musée des Suisses dans le monde, Geneva, Switzerland; Musée de la Photographie, Charleroi, Belgium; Brandts Museum of Photographic Art (Museet for Fotokunst), Odensee, Denmark; New Mexico Museum of Art, Santa Fe, New Mexico; The Ashley Gibson Barnett Museum of Art, (formerly, the Polk Museum of Art), Lakeland, Florida; Pushkin Museum of Fine Arts, Moscow, Russian Federation; Southeast Museum of Photography, Daytona Beach, Florida; Swiss National Library, Bern, Switzerland; Museum of Fine Arts, Houston, Texas; and The New York Public Library, New York City, New York.

== Bibliography (books with John Bernhard's work, selection) ==
- The Art of Dreams, Visions, Other Worlds, by Robert Craig Bunch, published by Texas A&M University Press, 2024, ISBN 978-1-648432-32-3
- Unexpected: HTX Artists Among Us, by Alan G Montgomery, 2024, ISBN 979-8-889404-18-7
- Nude Bible, anthology, Udyat & Tectum Publishers, Barcelona and Brussels, 2007, ISBN 9-076886-50-4
- Love an Desire: Photoworks, by William Ewing, published by Chronicle Books, 1999, ISBN 0-811826-21-X
- Graphis Photo Annual 2004, by Michael Porciello, Graphis Inc. Press, 2003, ISBN 1-931241-33-3
- FotoFest Books 2002, 2004, 2006, 2008, published by FotoFest, Inc.
- Hedendaagse Naaktfotografie II (Facing Female Nudity), published by Librero Nederland b.v., 2000
