= Mariano Bernardini =

Italian football player (born 1998)

Personal information
- Date of birth: 14 January 1998 (age 28)
- Place of birth: Naples, Italy
- Height: 1.80 m (5 ft 11 in)
- Position: Midfielder

Youth career
- –2016: Paganese
- 2017: Genoa

Senior career*
Years	Team	Apps	(Gls)
2016–2017	Paganese	1	(0)
2017–2019	Genoa	0	(0)
2017–2018	→ Paganese (loan)	13	(0)
2018–2019	→ Lucchese (loan)	23	(0)
2019–2020	Pontedera	20	(0)
2020–2021	Real Aversa	3	(0)
2021	Vado	16	(1)
2021–2022	Cassino	31	(6)
2022–2023	Legnago	18	(0)
2023–2024	Ostia Mare	25	(5)
2024	FC Pompei	0	(0)
- * Club domestic league appearances and goals as of 25 Juny 2026

Mariano Bernardini (born 14 January 1998) is an Italian footballer who plays as a midfielder.

== Career ==
=== Paganese ===
Born in Naples, Bernardini started his career in the Paganese youth team. On 4 September 2016, Bernardini made his professional debut in Serie C for Paganese in a 2–1 away defeat against Matera, he was replaced by Raffaele Stoia in the 57th minute, in that season he was also an unused substitute 3 times.

=== Genoa ===
On 31 January 2017, Bernardini was signed by Serie A side Genoa with an undisclosed fee.

==== Loan to Paganese ====
On 21 July 2017, Bernardini returned to Serie C club Paganese on a season-long loan deal. On 30 July he made his debut for Paganese in a 6–0 away defeat against Trapani in the first round of Coppa Italia, he played the entire match. On 2 September, Bernardini played his first match in Serie C for Paganese in this season, a 2–0 away win over Cosenza, he was replaced by Thadee Alvaro Ngamba in the 59th minute. On 25 February 2018, Bernardini played his first entire match for Paganese, a 1–0 home defeat against Fidelis Andria. Bernardini ended his season-long loan to Paganese with 14 appearances, including only 6 as a starter.

==== Loan to Lucchese ====
On 31 July 2018, Bernardini was signed by Serie C side Lucchese on a season-long loan deal.

==== Loan to Pontedera ====
On 29 June 2019, he was loaned to Pontedera on Serie C.

=== Serie D ===
On 24 January 2020, he moved to Real Aversa.

On 4 January 2021, he joined to Vado.

For the 2021–22 season, he joined to Cassino.

== Career statistics ==
=== Club ===
As of 26 June 2019

Club	Season	League			Cup		Europe		Other		Total	
Club	Season	League	Apps	Goals	Apps	Goals	Apps	Goals	Apps	Goals	Apps	Goals
Paganese	2016–17	Serie C	1	0	0	0	—		—		1	0
Paganese (loan)	2017–18	Serie C	13	0	1	0	—		—		14	0
Lucchese (loan)	2018–19	Serie C	23	0	3	0	—		3	0	29	0
Career total			37	0	4	0	—		3	0	44	0
