= Bernardino de Anaya =

Bernardino de Anaya came to Peru in the middle of the 16th century and founded the city of Chachapoyas, Peru. Alderete Maldonado of Anaya, better known as "the admiral", settled down in Cusco and at present his house is a museum called "The House of the Admiral". Also, Anaya was entrusted to kill the last Inca in Vilcabamba, but had no success, so they killed it.
