= Giacomo Bernardi =

American ecologist

Giacomo Bernardi is a Professor of Ecology and Evolutionary Biology at University of California Santa Cruz. He earned his B.A., M.S., and Ph.D. at the University of Paris and did post-doctoral work from 1991 to 1994 at Hopkins Marine Station at Stanford University.

His research includes working on phylogeography, speciation and molecular ecology of fishes, particularly in fishes lacking a pelagic larval phase, Gulf of California and Pacific disjunct species, and in surfperches (Embiotocidae). His research compares phylogeographic and gene expression patterns to test for local adaptation in a high gene flow species. He is also interested in population structure of coastal and island groupers. He also investigates adult population structure and the structure of a new year-class within Sebastes mystinus (blue rockfish) and Sebastes atrovirens (kelp rockfish) over multiple temporal and spatial scales. He studies at the Richard Gump South Pacific Research Station.

== Selected publications ==
- Robertson DR, Karg F, de Moura RL, Victor BC, and Bernardi G. 2006. "Mechanisms of speciation and faunal enrichment in Atlantic parrotfishes". Molecular Phylogenetics and Evolution 40: 795-807
- Bernardi, G. and J. Lape. 2005. "Tempo and mode of speciation in the Baja California disjunct fish species Anisotremus davidsonii". Molecular Ecology 14: 4085-4096.
- Bernardi, G. 2005. "Phylogeography and demography of sympatric sister species, Embiotoca jacksoni and E. lateralis along the California coast: Historical versus ecological factors". Evolution 59 386-394.
- Crow, K.D., Kanamoto, Z., and Bernardi, G. 2004. "Molecular phylogeny of the hexagrammid fishes using a multi-locus approach". Molecular Phylogenetics and Evolution 32: 986-997.
- Bernardi, G., Bucciarelli, G., Costagliola, D., Robertson, D.R., and Heiser, J.B. 2003. "Evolution of coral reef fish Thalassoma spp. (Labridae): 1.Molecular phylogeny and biogeography". Marine Biology 144:369-375.
- Costagliola, D., Robertson, D.R., Guidetti, P., Stefanni, S., Wirtz, P., Heiser, J.B., and Bernardi, G. 2003. "Evolution of the coral reef fish Thalassoma spp. (Labridae): 2. Evolution of the eastern Atlantic species". Marine Biology 144:377-383.
- Bernardi, G., Holbrook, S.J., Schmitt, R.J., and Crane, N.L. 2003. "Genetic evidence for two distanct clades in a French Ploynesian population of the coral reef three-spot damselfish, Dascyllus trimaculatus". Marine Biology 143:485-490.
- Bernardi, G., Findley, L., and Rocha-Olivares, A. 2003. "Vicariance and dispersal across Baja California in disjunct marine fish populations". Evolution 57:1599-1609.
- Fauvelot, C., Bernardi, G., Bonhomme, F., and Planes, S. 2003. "Reductions in the mitochondrial DNA diversity of coral reef fish provide evidence of population bottlenecks resulting from Holocene sea-level change", Evolution 57:1571-1583.
- Bucciarelli, G., Golani, D., and Bernardi, G. 2002. "Genetic cryptic species as biological invaders: The case of a Lessepsian fish migrant, the hardyhead silverside Atherinomorus lacunosus". J. Exp. Mar. Biol. Ecol 273:143-149.
- Bernardi, G., Holbrook, S.J., Schmitt, R.J., Crane, N.L., and DeMartini, E. 2002. "Species boundaries, populations, and colour morphs in the coral reef three-spot damselfish (Dascyllus trimaculatus) species-complex". Proc. Roy. Soc. London 269:599-605.
- Planes, S., Doherty, P., and Bernardi, G. 2001. "Unusual case of extreme genetic divergence in a marine fish, Acanthochromis polyacanthus, within the Great Barrier Reef and the Coral Sea". Evolution 55:2263-2273.
- Bernardi G., Holbrook S.J., and Schmitt R.J. 2001. "Dispersal of the coral reef three-spot dascyllus, Dascyllus trimaculatus, at three spatial scales". Mar. Biol. 138:457-465.
- Huang, D., and Bernardi, G. 2001. "Disjunct Sea of Cortez - Pacific Ocean Gillichthys mirabilis populations and the evolutionary origin of their paedomorphic relative, Gillichthys seta". Mar. Biol. 138:421-428.
