= Pierre Bénard =

French journalist (1898–1946)

- Born: November 17, 1898
- Died: December 23, 1946 (aged 48)
- Citizenship: France
- Occupation: Journalist
- Known for: Défense de la France
- Spouse: Geneviève Antoine
- Children: 1

Pierre Bénard (17 November 1898 – 23 December 1946) was a French journalist known for his columns during the Second World War.

== Background ==
Bénard was born in 1898; his father was clerk to an attorney. He began as a journalist in the 1920s, for L'Œuvre, where he held the judicial brief, and for Bonsoir. He was the author of upbeat novels and of many prefaces for works on contemporary law, at the same time doing large-scale reportages for various weekly publications including Gringoire (from which he distanced himself in 1934).

He joined Le Canard enchaîné in 1923, and became editor-in-chief there in 1936. During this period he was opposed to Jean Galtier-Boissière, on the issue of French military intervention in Spain.

During the Second World War, he participated in the beginning of 1944 in the underground paper of Défense de la France. He also wrote in Combat and in the clandestine Lettres françaises; his articles were unsigned but written in a characteristic style, identifiable by his puns, witticisms and incessant carriage returns.

After the liberation of France Bénard went back to editing weekly papers, but died shortly after on 22 December 1946. He was married to Geneviève Antoine, herself a journalist at Bonsoir, with whom he had a daughter.
