= Leslie Gordon Barnard =

Canadian writer

- Born: January 16, 1890; Montreal, Quebec
- Died: October 28, 1961 (aged 71); Toronto, Ontario
- Occupation: Novelist
- Spouse: Margaret Elizabeth Elliott (m. 1923)
- Writing career
- Period: 20th century
- Genres: Novels, short stories

Leslie Gordon Barnard (January 16, 1890 – October 28, 1961) was a Canadian novelist and short story writer.

== Biography ==
Barnard was born in Montreal, Quebec in 1891. His parents were Herbert Alfred Barnard and Annie Maude Russell. He was educated at public and private schools in the Westmount area of Montreal. In 1918, he enlisted in the army but the war ended before he could serve overseas. In 1923, he married Margaret Elizabeth Elliott.

Barnard started writing in 1920 writing mostly short stories. He contributed to several magazines in Canada, the United States and England. By the end of his life he had written over 500 stories. One of his popular series centred on a detective named Mr. Philibus whose stories appeared in Detective Magazine between 1928 and 1935. He also wrote three novels and the occasional one act play. His novel Jancis won the Quebec Government award for fiction in 1940.

He died in Toronto in 1961. He is buried in Montreal.

== Works ==
- One Generation Away (1931) [Short story collection]
- Jancis (1935)
- Winter Road (1939)
- The Immortal Child (1941)
- So Near is Grandeur (1945)
