= Philip Augustus Barnard =

British painter (1813–1897)

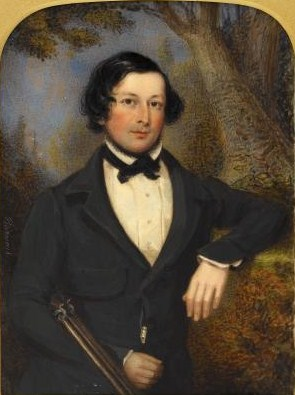
Portrait miniature of Mr. Charles Brett (on ivory, 1841)

Philip Augustus Barnard (1813–1897) was a British painter, born in London. Barnard produced miniatures and portraits in oils, and his work was exhibited at the Royal Academy for almost forty-five years. He was married to fellow painter Hebe Saunders, who also exhibited works under her married name. They were the parents of the portrait painter Walter Saunders Barnard (1851–1930).

He also rose to minor prominence when he painted a miniature painting of Queen Victoria as a gift. It was never passed on to her, and instead hung in the Royal Academy.
