= Rudolph Bernhard =

Rudolph Bernhard (fl. 1700), originally rabbi Jacob Levi of Prague, was a Christian writer. He was baptised at Bern in 1694. In 1705 he published the proselytizing letter Sendschreiben: Geschrieben an die so genannten Juden. When he died he left a manuscript translation in Hebrew of Matthew, Mark, and Luke up to chapter 16:31.
