= Andrew Bernardi =

British entrepreneur and violinist

Andrew Bernardi (born 22 April 1965) is an English violinist, educator, festival director and entrepreneur.

He lives in the parish of Shipley near Horsham, and has performed with many of the UK's leading orchestras, including Guildford Philharmonic Orchestra, the Royal Philharmonic Orchestra and The Bernardi Music Group. He is a member of staff at Trinity Laban Conservatoire of Music and Dance. He has founded Bernardi Music Group, Shipley Arts Festival, Stradivarius Piano Trio, String Academy. The Shipley Arts Festival has commissioned new works, including Great Hill's by Cecilia McDowall, The Margraves Dream by Malcolm Singer and To Notice Such Things by the late Jon Lord (formerly of Deep Purple). He has for many years collaborated with the Yehudi Menuhin School, with whom he closed the 2019 Shipley Festival with Malcolm Singer's cantata Dragons.

He has performed as guest concertmaster for Manchester Camerata, the Oporto Chamber Orchestra, and leading Bernardi Music Group. He is married to Lucy Bernardi and they have a son, Joshua Bernardi.

Bernardi was educated at The Skinners' School, Tunbridge Wells, Leeds University Bretton Hall and Trinity College of Music, where he led all the orchestras as a postgraduate scholar. Bernardi plays on the 'Amici Bernardi Stradivarius violin, and violin bow formerly owned by Yehudi Menuhin.
