= Berend McKenzie =

Canadian actor and playwright

- Occupations: Actor, Playwright
- Notable work: NGGRFG (Would you say the name of this play?)

Berend McKenzie is a Canadian actor and playwright. As an actor he is most known for playing Lance in the 2004 film, Catwoman. As a playwright Berend is most known for his controversial play, Nggrfg (Nigger fag, subtitled, Would You Say the Name of This Play?).

== Biography ==
Berend is of African descent. He was adopted by a Caucasian family; growing up in Alberta. There he found little support for being homosexual due the areas Christian beliefs. His family was supportive of him upon coming out to them. He also found it hard to be a gay black male in Alberta, often being called the slurs, "nigger" and "fag"; this subsequently inspired his play, Nggrfg, an exploration of the two words that he was called the most growing up. After being caught in a "drunken grope-fest" with another boy at a party, his student council asked him to leave school as they feared he "wouldn't be safe." McKenzie fled both home and school shortly after.

== Career and success of "Nggrfg" ==
Berend made his film debut in the 2002 movie, Life or Something Like It in a small role alongside Angelina Jolie. As a film actor, Berend is most known for playing the role of sassy art department representative, Lance in the 2004 action superhero film, Catwoman alongside Alex Borstein and Halle Berry. In 2006, McKenzie debuted at the Edmonton Fringe Festival with his first full-length play, Get Off the Cross, Mary, a queer disco puppet remake of The Passion of the Christ. This play won the Xtra West Hero Award for Best Live Performance in 2008. McKenzie's second full-length play debuted in 2010, Nggrfg, an autobiographical play regarding the two most used slurs he heard growing up in Alberta, Canada. Nggrfg is set up as four stories told by McKenzie about growing up black and gay in Alberta, with little tolerance for each by his peers. The play earned a Jessie Award nomination for Original Script and was also run at Halifax's Queer Acts Theatre Festival. An adaptation of the play entitled, Tassels, was also made in order to portray an appropriate storyline for elementary and middle schools.

=== Film ===
Year	Title	Role	Notes
2002	Life or Something Like It	Makeup Guy	Film debut
2004	Catwoman	Lance	Final film to date

=== Television ===
Year	Title	Role	Notes
2002	Andromeda	Lem	1 episode
2002	Jeremiah	Medicine Joe	1 episode
2002	Cold Squad	Jeremy	1 episode

== Playwright ==
Years	Title	Role	Notes	Ref.
2006	Get Off the Cross, Mary	Playwright Performer	First full-length play debut as playwright. Gay puppets reenact The Flaming Passion of the Christ.	
2010	NGGRFG (Would you say the name of this play?)	Playwright Performer	A one-man autobiographical play about self-acceptance.	
