= HHole =

Former artwork in Mannheim, Germany

HHole for Mannheim (2006-∞) is a permanent multimedia installation in the "Athene-Trakt" of the Kunsthalle Mannheim created by NatHalie Braun Barends.

When the Kunsthalle underwent reconstruction in 2015, the installation was removed. Following a legal dispute and a decision of a German Federal Court which stated that the removal of the work does not infringe the artist's intellectual property rights, the installation will most likely not be rebuilt afterwards.

== Description ==
HHole for Mannheim (2006-∞) has been conceived as a permanent, conceptual, site specific, developing artwork in progress. It consists of seven holes which pass through the Athene Trakt that unites the old (Billing-Bau) and the new building (Mitzlaff-Bau) of the Mannheim Kunsthalle.

The natural light flows from the topmost hole above the museum rooftop, through the holes in the floors below, meeting the light projected upwards from a Gobo projector located at the lowest floor. At the rooftop, a custom designed laser light (also used by astronomers to point at stars), projects into the universe the artist's symbol of the HMap. The natural and the artificial lights meet again symbolically at the antipodes of the museum, close to New Zealand at 49° 28′ 56.68″ S, 171° 31′ 29.63″ E.

Seven rooms contain the seven holes, starting from above: Infinite Room, Phoenix Room, Reflection Room, Silence Room, Treasure Room, Ground Room, and Earth Room.

Each room hosts different installations, with videos, HHole specially designed acrylic furniture, waterfall, living tree, pool, and telephone to connect each level.
