= Carl Gustaf Bernhard =

Swedish physician, neurophysiologist and academic

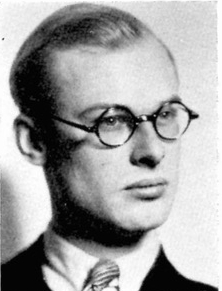

Carl Gustaf Bernhard (28 April 1910, Jakob parish, Stockholm Municipality – 13 January 2001, Lidingö parish) was a Swedish physician, neurophysiologist and academic. He was married to Gurli Lemon-Bernhard, opera singer and soprano. Together they had four children: Carl Johan, Pontus, Per and Blenda.

== Early life ==
He contracted tuberculosis as a youth. After years of treatment, he recovered. This experience led him to want to become a doctor.

He was awarded a Ph.D. in 1940 as a result of his dissertation on vision neurophysiology. His scientific work dealt mainly with the neurophysiology of the optic pathway and visual system, building on this early work.

== Career ==
He was a professor at the Karolinska Institute from 1948 through 1971.

In 1968, he was made a member of the Royal Swedish Academy of Sciences. He served as Permanent Secretary of the Academy during the years 1973 through 1981. In this period, he developed a special interest in one of his predecessors—Jons Jacob Berzelius. He was elected a Foreign Honorary Member of the American Academy of Arts and Sciences in 1976.

Bernhard founded the Berzelius Society and published two books on Berzelius:

- 1985 – Med Berzelius bland franska snillen och slocknade vulkaner
- 1993 – Berzelius Europaresenären - bland forskare, prostar och poeter
