= Bernardo (surname) =

Bernardo is a surname. Notable people with the surname include:

- Bernardo Bernardo (1941–2018), Filipino veteran stage actor, comedian, and film director
- Bernardo Tavares (born 1980), Portuguese football manager
- José-Miguel Bernardo (born 1950), Spanish statistician
- Joseph Bernardo (1929–2023), French swimmer
- Kathryn Bernardo (born 1996), Filipina actress
- Mariano Bernardo (born 1988), Brazilian footballer
- Mike Bernardo (1969–2012), South African kickboxer and boxer
- Noah Bernardo (born 1972), drummer and a founding member of the San Diego–based band P.O.D.
- Paul Bernardo (born 1964), Canadian serial killer and rapist
- Samantha Bernardo (born 1992), Filipina beauty pageant titleholder, Binibining Pilipinas Grand International 2020, and 1st runner up Miss Grand International 2020

== See also ==
- Barend, Barends, Barnard, Behrendt, Berend, Berent, Berendt, Behrent, Bernard, Bernhard, Bernhardt, Bernt, Berndt
- Benard, Bénard, Besnard, Bernardi, Bernardo, Bernardy
- Template:Bear-surname
