= Bernardy =

Bernardy is a surname, and may refer to:

- Amy Bernardy (1880–1959), Italian folklorist and writer
- Charles Bernardy (1724–1807) Flemish-French dancing master
- Connie Bernardy (born 1963), American politician from Minnesota
- JD Bernardy, American politician

== See also ==
- Barend, Barends, Barnard, Behrendt, Berend, Berent, Berendt, Behrent, Bernard, Bernhard, Bernhardt, Bernt, Berndt
- Benard, Bénard, Besnard, Bernardi, Bernardo, Bernardy
- Template:Bear-surname
