= Friedrich Bernhard =

German general

- Born: 5 October 1888 German Empire
- Died: 29 December 1945 (aged 57) Bryansk, Soviet Union
- Cause of death: Execution by hanging
- Allegiance: German Empire; Nazi Germany
- Branch: Imperial German Army; German Army
- Rank: Generalleutnant
- Commands: 9th Army
- Conflicts: World War I World War II
- Awards: German Cross

Friedrich Bernhard (5 October 1888 – 30 December 1945) was a German Lieutenant-General of the Cavalry, serving during World War II as a Panzer commander. He was a recipient of the German Cross in Gold on 17 March 1944. He held command of Special Corps 532 in the 9th Army. After being captured by the Red Army, he was sentenced to death by a Soviet military tribunal in Bryansk on 29 December 1945 for atrocities committed in the Bryansk area, and was subsequently executed the following morning.
