= Cristofano Berardi =

Italian engraver

- Born: Bologna
- Occupation: Engraver

Cristofano Berardi (18th century) was an Italian engraver. Although born in Bologna, he is known for his vedute of France. He trained with the Florentine engraver Giuseppe Zocchi.
