= Benard (surname) =

Benard is a surname, and may refer to:

- Cheryl Benard (born 1953), American academic and writer
- Chris Benard (born 1990), American track and field athlete
- Deo Benard (born 2003), American ten-pin bowler
- Jacques Renaud Benard (1731–1794), French engraver
- Marcos Abel Flores Benard (born 1985), Argentine footballer
- Marcus Benard (born 1985), American football linebacker
- Marvin Benard (born 1970), Nicaraguan baseball player and manager
- Maurice Benard (born 1963), American actor
- Raymond Benard, stage name of Ray "Crash" Corrigan (1902–1976), American actor

== See also ==
- Barend, Barends, Barnard, Behrendt, Berend, Berent, Berendt, Behrent, Bernard, Bernhard, Bernhardt, Bernt, Berndt
- Benard, Bénard, Besnard, Bernardi, Bernardo, Bernardy
- Template:Bear-surname
