= Berend Kordes =

German theologian (1762–1823)

- Born: 27 October 1762; Lübeck
- Died: 5 February 1823 (aged 60); Kiel
- Occupation: Librarian
- Employer: Kiel University

Berend Kordes or Berenne Kordes (27 October 1762 – 5 February 1823) was a German writer on exegetical theology. He was born at Lubeck on 27 October 1762, and studied at the universities of Kiel, Leipzig, and Jena. In 1793 he became librarian of the university at Kiel. and died there Feb. 5,1823. His exegetical works are, Observationumn in Jonce Oracula Specimina (Jena, 1788):-Ruth ex versione Septuaginta intepraetum (Jena, 1788).-Hoefer, Nouv. Biog. Generale, 28:84.

This article incorporates public domain material from McClintock, John; Strong, James (1867–1887). Cyclopædia of Biblical, Theological and Ecclesiastical Literature. Harper and Brothers.
