= Bernd Reichelt =

German politician

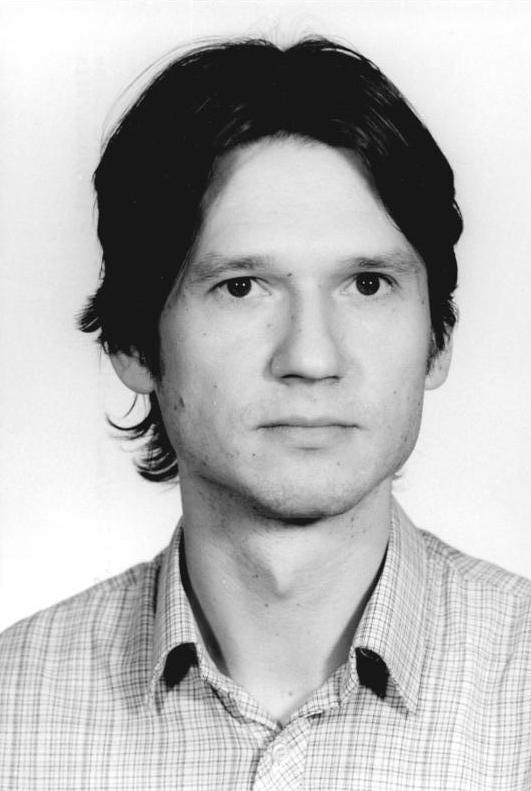
Dr. Bernd Reichelt, in 1990

Bernd Reichelt is a German politician. In the 1990 East German elections, he was elected to the Volkskammer (parliament of the GDR) on behalf of the Green Party.
