= Barend (surname) =

Barend is a Dutch patronymic surname and it may refer to:

- Johnny Barend (1929–2011), American professional wrestler
- Samara Barend (born ca. 1978), American politician
- Sonja Barend (1940–2026), Dutch television personality and talk show host

== See also ==
- Barend, a common Dutch given name
- Barend, Barends, Barnard, Behrendt, Berend, Berent, Berendt, Behrent, Bernard, Bernhard, Bernhardt, Bernt, Berndt
- Benard, Bénard, Besnard, Berardi, Bernardi, Bernardin, Bernardini, Bernardo, Bernardoni, Bernardy
- Template:Bear-surname
