= Barend =

Barend or (somewhat dated spelling) Barent is a Dutch male given name and occasional middle name. As of 2014, there are over 4,000 men in the Netherlands with this as their first name, and nearly 3,000 with it as their middle name. It was likely derived from Bernard. Notable people with the name include:

- Barent Avercamp (1612–1679), Dutch painter
- Barend Biesheuvel (1920–2001), Dutch politician
- Barend Bonneveld (1887–1978), Dutch Olympic wrestler
- Barent Fabritius (1624–1673), Dutch painter
- Barent Gael (c. 1630–1698), Dutch painter
- Barent Gardenier (1776–1822), American lawyer and politician
- Barend Graat (1628–1709), Dutch painter
- Barent van Kalraet (1649–1737), Dutch painter
- Barend van der Meer (1659–1700), Dutch painter
- Barent Momma (1897–1936), Dutch modern pentathlete
- Barend Mons (born 1957), Dutch biologist
- Barend Pieterse (born 1979), South African former rugby player
- Barend van Someren (1572–1632), Dutch painter
- Barent Staats (1796–?), American politician
