= Bernt =

Bernt is a Scandinavian variant of the German masculine given name Berend, which is the Low German form of Bernard (Bernhard). The name Bernhard means "strong bear" (from Old German bero, "bear", and harti, "strong"). Its use in Sweden was first documented in 1395.

Notable people with the name include:

== Given name ==
- Bernt Albert (born 1944), Norwegian politician for the Conservative Party
- Bernt Balchen, D.F.C. (1899–1973), Norwegian, and later Norwegian-American, polar and aviation pioneer
- Bernt Bjørnsgaard (born 1973), Norwegian orienteering competitor and World champion
- Bernt Bull (born 1946), Norwegian politician for the Labour Party
- Bernt Carlsson (1938–1988), Assistant-Secretary-General of the United Nations and United Nations Commissioner for Namibia
- Bernt Johan Collet (born 1941), son of Chamberlain and Master of the Royal Hunt, Harald Collet and landscape architect Else Collett
- Bernt Evens (born 1978), Belgian professional footballer
- Bernt Evensen (1905–1979), Norwegian speed skater and racing cyclist
- Bernt Frilén, Swedish orienteering competitor, winner of the 1974 Individual World Orienteering Championships
- Bernt Haas (born 1978), Swiss football (soccer) defender
- Bernt Hagtvet (born 1946), Norwegian political scientist
- Bernt B. Haugan (1862–1931), American Lutheran minister, politician, and temperance leader
- Bernt Michael Holmboe (1795–1850), Norwegian mathematician
- Bernt Holtsmark (1859–1941), Norwegian farmer and politician for the Conservative Party and the Liberal Left Party
- Bernt Hulsker (born 1977), Norwegian footballer playing
- Bernt Ingvaldsen (1902–1985), Norwegian politician for the Conservative Party
- Bernt Johansson (born 1953), retired road bicycle racer from Sweden, professional rider from 1977 to 1981
- Bernt Julius Muus (1832–1900), Norwegian-American Lutheran minister and church leader
- Bernt Klaverboer (born 2005), Dutch footballer
- Bernt Krebs, German scientist
- Bernt Sverdrup Maschmann (1805–1869), Norwegian priest and politician
- Hans Bernt Myhre (1817–1863), Norwegian politician
- Bernt Notke (1435–1509), German painter and sculptor
- Bernt Oftestad (born 1942), professor in Western Cultural History at MF Norwegian School of Theology
- Bernt Øksendal (born 1945), Norwegian mathematician
- Bernt Olufsen (born 1954), the Editor-in-Chief of Verdens Gang (VG), the largest daily of Norway
- Bernt Østerkløft (1906–1996), Norwegian Nordic combined skier
- Bernt Östh (born 1936), Swedish Air Force major general
- Bernt Persson (1946–2020), Swedish former international speedway rider
- Bernt Petersen (1937–2017), Danish furniture designer often known simply as Bernt
- Jordan Bernt Peterson (born 1962), Canadian clinical psychologist and professor of psychology at the University of Toronto
- Bernt Rosengren (1937–2023), Swedish jazz tenor saxophonist
- Bernt Ström (1940–2009), Swedish actor
- Bernt Tunold (1877–1946), Norwegian painter
- Bernt Wahl, mathematician, entrepreneur and author
- Bernt Wilhelm Westermann (1781–1868), wealthy Danish businessman who collected insects

== Surname ==
- Eric Bernt, American screenwriter
- Jan Fridthjof Bernt (born 1943), Norwegian jurist, Professor of Law and former rector (1996–1998) at the University of Bergen

== Fictional characters ==
- A protagonist from D'ække bare, bare Bernt, Norwegian sitcom that aired on TV3 from 1996 to 1997

== See also ==
- Bernd
- Barend, Barends, Barnard, Behrendt, Berend, Berent, Berendt, Behrent, Bernard, Bernhard, Bernhardt, Bernt, Berndt
- Benard, Bénard, Besnard, Bernardi, Bernardo, Bernardy
- Template:Bear-surname
