= Bernhardt (surname) =

Bernhardt is a surname, and may refer to:

- Alexandra Bernhardt (born 1974) German philosopher, poet, translator and publisher
- Arthuro Henrique Bernhardt (born 1982), Brazilian footballer
- Carl-Johan Bernhardt (1946–2016), Swedish table tennis player
- Carlos Bernhardt (born 1950), Dominican baseball scout
- Clyde Bernhardt (1905–1986), American jazz trombonist
- Curtis Bernhardt (1899–1981), German film director
- Dan Bernhardt (born 1958), American-Canadian economist
- Daniel Bernhardt (born 1965), Swiss actor and martial arts expert
- Daniel Bernhardt (footballer) (born 1985), German football goalkeeper
- Daniel Bernhardt (ice hockey) (born 1996), Swedish ice hockey player
- David Bernhardt (born 1969), American lawyer and politician
- David Bernhardt (ice hockey) (born 1997), Swedish ice hockey player
- Debra Bernhardt (born 1965), Australian theoretical chemist
- Edgar Bernhardt (born 1986), Kyrgyz footballer
- Edmond Bernhardt (1885–1976), Austrian swimmer, sports shooter and modern pentathlete
- Emilie Bernhardt (born 2002), German football player
- Emily Bernhardt, American ecologist, biogeochemist and academic
- Ernie Bernhardt (born c.1944), Canadian politician from Northwest Territories
- Eve Bernhardt (1930–2014), American actress
- Frank Bernhardt (born 1969), German football player and manager
- Frank X. Bernhardt (1858–1937), American businessman and politician from New York
- George Bernhardt (1919–1987), American football player and coach
- Hans Bernhardt (1906–1940), German cyclist
- Horst Bernhardt (1951–2021), German bobsledder
- Jared Bernhardt (born 1997), American lacrosse player
- Jay M. Bernhardt (born 1969), American public health specialist and academic
- Johannes Bernhardt (1897–1980), Spanish-German businessman and SS member
- Juan Bernhardt (born 1953), Dominican baseball player
- Julie Bernhardt, Australian physiotherapist and clinician scientist
- Karl S. Bernhardt (1901–1967), Canadian psychologist
- Katherine Bernhardt (born 1975), American artist
- Katie Bernhardt, American political organizer from Louisiana
- Kevin Bernhardt, American screenwriter, film and television actor and producer
- Margit Bernhardt (born 1897), German figure skater
- Martin Bernhardt (1844–1915), German neuropathologist
- Melvin Bernhardt (1931–2015), American stage and television director
- Otto Bernhardt (1942–2021), German politician
- Patrick Bernhardt (born 1971), German racing driver
- Robert Bernhardt (21st century), American conductor
- Roger Bernhardt (born 1949), American football player
- Rüdiger Bernhardt (born 1940), German Germanist and Scandinavist
- Rudolf Bernhardt (1925–2021), German judge
- Sarah Bernhardt (1844–1923), French stage actress
- Sonja Bernhardt (born 1959), Australian information technology industry mentor
- Théo Bernhardt (born 2000), French politician
- Tim Bernhardt (born 1958), Canadian ice hockey player
- Vipa Bernhardt (born 1982), German swimmer
- Walter Bernhardt (1893–1958), American baseball pitcher
- Warren Bernhardt (1938–2022), American jazz pianist
- William Bernhardt (born 1960), American novelist

== See also ==
- Barend, Barends, Barnard, Behrendt, Berend, Berent, Berendt, Behrent, Bernard, Bernhard, Bernhardt, Bernt, Berndt
- Benard, Bénard, Besnard, Bernardi, Bernardo, Bernardy
- Template:Bear-surname
