= Berndt =

Berndt is a surname and can refer to:

- Arthur Berndt (1884–1947), American football, basketball, baseball player and coach
- Bruce C. Berndt (born 1939), American mathematician
- Catherine Berndt (1918–1994), Australian anthropologist
- Doug Berndt (1949–1995), American figure skater
- Hans-Christoph Berndt, German politician
- Jerry Berndt (1938–2022), American tennis player
- John Berndt, American musician
- Jule Berndt (1924–1997), American Lutheran clergyman and politician
- Helmut Berndt (1915–1990), Sudeten German-Czechoslovak athlete
- Marianne Berndt (born 1978), Chilean shot putter and discus thrower
- Ronald Berndt (1916–1990), Australian social anthropologist
- Sonja Berndt, American pharmacologist and cancer epidemiologist
- Walter Berndt (1899–1979), American cartoonist
- William Berndt (born 1956), American politician

Berndt can also be a given name:

- Berndt Ekholm (born 1944), Swedish politician
- Berndt Sköldestig (1944–2006), Swedish politician

== See also ==
- Barend, Barends, Barnard, Behrendt, Berend, Berent, Berendt, Behrent, Bernard, Bernhard, Bernhardt, Bernt, Berndt
- Benard, Bénard, Besnard, Bernardi, Bernardo, Bernardy
- Template:Bear-surname
