= Barends =

Barends is a Dutch patronymic surname. (son of "Barend"). People with this name include:

- Brady Barends (born 1989), South African cricketer
- David Barends (fl. 1970–83), South African rugby player
- Indy Barends (born 1972), Indonesian television host
- NatHalie Braun Barends, German-born multi-media artist

== See also ==
- Barend, Barends, Behrendt, Berend, Berent, Berendt, Behrent, Bernard, Bernhard, Bernhardt, Bernt, Berndt
- Template:Bear-surname
