= Berendt =

Berendt is a surname, a variant of Behrendt. Notable people with the surname include:

- Georg Karl Berendt (1790–1850), German physician and paleontologist
- Joachim-Ernst Berendt (1922–2000), German jazz journalist
- Johannes Berendt (born 1981), German syndicated columnist
- John Berendt (born 1939), American author
- Jorge Berendt (born 1964), Argentine golfer
- Nicolai Berendt (1826–1889), Danish pianist and composer
- Paul Berendt, chairman of the Washington State Democratic Party, 1995-2006

== See also ==
- Barend, Barends, Behrendt, Berend, Berent, Berendt, Behrent, Bernard, Bernhard, Bernhardt, Bernt, Berndt
- Template:Bear-surname
