= Berend =

A Dutch masculine given name and Low German surname that is a form of the Germanic Bernard (Bernhard). The name Bernhard means "Strong bear" or "Strong as a bear" (from Old German bero, "bear", and harti, "strong"). It is related to the Scandinavian name Bernt.

== Surname ==
- Béla Berend (1911–1987), Hungarian rabbi
- Ben Berend (born 1995), American skier
- Charlotte Berend-Corinth (1880–1967), German painter
- Elvira Berend (born 1965), Luxembourg chess grandmaster
- Fritz Berend (1889–1955), German English conductor
- Gudrun Berend, (1955–2011), German athlete
- Issachar Berend Lehmann (1661–1730), Court Jew
- Iván Berend (born 1930), Hungarian historian
- Julius Berend Cohen (1859–1935), British chemist
- Nóra Berend, Hungarian historian

== Given name ==
- Berend Brummelman (1943–2023), Dutch rower
- Berend Tobia Boeyinga (1886–1969), Dutch architect
- Berend Carp (1901–1966), Dutch Olympic sailor
- Berend George Escher (1885–1967), Dutch geologist
- Berend Wilhelm Feddersen (1832–1918), German physicist
- Berend Hendriks (1918–1997), Dutch artist and lecturer
- Berend Kordes (1762–1823), German writer
- Berend McKenzie, Canadian actor and playwright
- Berend Schabus (born 1957), Austrian speed skater
- Berend Strik (born 1960), Dutch visual artist
- Berend Jan Udink (1926–2016), Dutch politician
- Berend Veneberg (born 1965), Dutch strongman
- Berend-Jan van Voorst tot Voorst (1944–2023), Dutch politician
- Berend von Wetter-Rosenthal (1874–1940), Baltic-German politician
- Berend Weijs (born 1988), Dutch basketball player

== See also ==
- Barend, Barends, Behrendt, Berend, Berent, Berendt, Behrent, Bernard, Bernhard, Bernhardt, Bernt, Berndt
- Template:Bear-surname
- Berend is the Hungarian name for Berindan village, Odoreu Commune, Satu Mare County, Romania
