= Behrent =

Behrent is a surname, a variant of Behrendt. Notable people with the surname include:

- Genevieve Behrent (born 1990), New Zealand rower
- John Behrent (1938–2024), New Zealand cricketer

== See also ==
- Barend, Barends, Behrendt, Berend, Berent, Berendt, Behrent, Bernard, Bernhard, Bernhardt, Bernt, Berndt
- Template:Bear-surname
