= Berent (surname) =

Berent is a surname of German origin, a variant of Behrendt. Notable people with the surname include:

- Iris Berent, Israeli-American cognitive psychologist
- Margarete Berent (1887–1965), German jurist
- Moshe Berent (born 1954), Israeli political scientist
- Stanislaus Berent (1901–1980), American circus performer
- Wacław Berent (1873–1940), Polish novelist and translator

== See also ==
- Barend, Barends, Behrendt, Berend, Berent, Berendt, Behrent, Bernard, Bernhard, Bernhardt, Bernt, Berndt
- Template:Bear-surname
