= Bernard (surname) =

Bernard is a surname, and may refer to:

== A ==
- Abraham Bernard (1831–1899), Canadian farmer, businessman and political figure from Quebec
- Adam J. Bernard (born 1988), British actor and singer
- Agnes Bernard (1842–1932), British Catholic nun
- Al Bernard (1888–1949), American vaudeville singer
- Alain Bernard (born 1983), French swimmer
- Alan Bernard (1934–2011), American sound engineer
- Albert Bernard (born 1917), Belgian fencer
- Aldis Bernard (c.1810–1876), Canadian dentist and politician
- Aldy Bernard (born 1995), Dominican model
- Alex Bernard (1882–1968), French silent film actor
- Alexis-Xyste Bernard (1847–1923), Canadian Catholic bishop
- Alfred Aloysous Bernard (1888–1949), American vaudeville singer
- Ali Bernard (born 1986), American wrestler
- Alvin Bernard (born 1955), Dominican economist and politician
- André Bernard (cyclist) (1930–2015), French racing cyclist
- André Bernard (pentathlete) (born 1935), French modern pentathlete
- André Antoine Bernard (1751–1818), French lawyer and revolutionary
- Andreas Bernard (born 1990), Italian ice hockey goaltender
- Andrée Bernard, English actress
- Andrew Bernard (born 1963), American economist
- Angélique Bernard (born 1972), Canadian politician from Yukon
- Annabelle Bernard (1934–2005), American operatic soprano
- Anthony Bernard (1891–1963), English conductor, organist, pianist and composer
- Antoine Bernard d'Attanoux (1853–1954), French journalist and explorer
- Antoine Bernard de Saint-Affrique, French businessman
- Anton Bernard (born 1989), Italian ice hockey player
- April Bernard (born 1956), American writer, poet and novelist
- Armand Bernard (1893–1968), French comic actor and composer
- Armand Bernard (wrestler) (1928–2010), Canadian wrestler
- A. W. Rabi Bernard (Arokiaswamy William Rabi Bernard) (born 1959), Indian politician
- Arthur Bernard (footballer) (1915–1984), Luxembourgish footballer
- Arthur Bernard (author) (1940–2022), French historian and essayist
- Augusta Bernard (1886–1946), French fashion designer

== B ==
- Barney Bernard (1877–1924), American stage and screen actor
- Bastien Bernard (born 1976), French footballer
- Benoît Bernard (born 1969), French sprint canoeist
- Bernard Bernard (1821–1895), French Catholic priest and missionary
- Bernard Bernard (wrestler) (1890–1975), British wrestler
- Billy Bernard (born 1991), Luxembourger footballer
- Bob Bernard (1961–2007), American technology executive
- Brad Bernard (born 1966), American football player and coach
- Brandon Bernard (1980–2020), American convicted murderer
- Bruce Bernard (1928–2000), English photographer, writer and picture editor
- Bruno Bernard (1912–1987), American glamour photographer
- Bruno Bernard (politician) (born 1970), French politician
- Brute Bernard, ring name of James Prudhomme (1921–1984), Canadian wrestler

== C ==
- Caitlin Bernard, American obstetrician-gynecologist and activist
- Camille Bernard (1898–1984), Canadian opera singer and actress
- Carlos Bernard (born 1962), American actor and director
- Caroline Richings Bernard (1832–1882), Anglo-American composer, impresario and singer
- Catherine Bernard (1662–1712), French novelist
- Charles Bernard (bishop) (1811–1890), Irish Anglican bishop
- Charles Bernard (civil servant) (1837–1901), administrator in British Burma
- Charles Bernard (cricketer) (1876–1953), English cricketer
- Charles Bernard (figure skater), American pair skater
- Charles Bernard (surgeon) (bapt.1652–1710), English royal surgeon
- Charles E. Bernard (1893–1979), American aviator and businessman
- Charles T. Bernard (1927–2015), American businessman and politician from Arkansas
- Charlotte Bernard (born 1972), French snowboarder
- Cheryl Bernard (born 1966), Canadian curler
- Chris Bernard (born 1955), English film director
- Christian Bernard (born 1951), French esotericist
- Christophe Bernard (born 1982), Canadian writer from Quebec
- Chuck Bernard (1911–1962), American football player
- Cindy Bernard, American artist
- Claston Bernard (born 1979), Jamaican-American decathlete
- Claude Bernard (priest) (1588–1641), French Catholic priest
- Claude Bernard (1813–1878), French physiologist
- Clinton Bernard (1930–2019), Trinidadian judge
- Craig Bernard, Canadian film director
- Crystal Bernard (born 1961), American actress
- Curt Bernard (1878–1955), American baseball player

== D ==
- D. G. M. Bernard (Dallas Gerald Mercer Bernard) (1888–1975), British banker and baronet
- Daniel Bernard (academic) (died 1588), English clergyman and scholar
- Daniel Bernard (businessman) (born 1946), French businessman
- Daniel Bernard (diplomat) (1941–2004), French Ambassador to the United Kingdom
- Daniel Bernard (footballer) (1949–2020), French footballer
- Daniel Bernard (politician) (born 1959), Canadian politicians
- Dave Bernard (American football) (1912–1973), American football player
- David Bernard (cricketer) (born 1981), Jamaican cricketer
- David Bernard (conductor) (born 1964), American conductor, pianist and clarinetist
- David Bernard (meteorologist) (born 1969), American television meteorologist
- David K. Bernard (born 1956), American New Testament scholar and theologian
- Delphine Bernard (born 1986), French wheelchair fencer
- Denis Bernard (actor) (born 1957), Canadian film, television and theatre actor and producer
- Denis Bernard (British Army officer) (1882–1956), British Army officer
- Denis Bernard (Gaelic footballer) (1932–2019), Irish Gaelic footballer
- Désirée Bernard (1939–2024), Guyanese lawyer and jurist
- Dick Bernard (1917–2012), Scottish lawn bowler
- Djuna Bernard (born 1992), Luxembourgish politician
- Dom Bernard (born 1997), English footballer
- Donna Bernard, British journalist and television presenter
- Dorel Bernard (born 1974), Romanian footballer
- Dorothy Bernard (1890–1955), American stage and silent era film actress
- Dwight Bernard (born 1952), American baseball pitcher

== E ==
- Ed Bernard (born 1939), American actor
- Eddy Bernard (born 2001), Malaysian para-athlete
- Edward Bernard (1638–1697), English scholar and academic
- Elaine Bernard, Canadian labour historian and legal scholar
- Elizabeth Bernard (1890–1971), American missionary
- Elizabeth Bernard (1608–1670), granddaughter of William Shakespeare
- Élodie Bernard (born 1984), French writer and entrepreneur
- Émile Bernard (1868–1941), French painter
- Émile Bernard (chef) (1826–1897), French chef and recipe book author
- Émile Bernard (composer) (1843–1902), French composer and organist
- Emily Bernard (born 1967), American writer
- Era Bernard, Indian politician
- Éric Bernard (born 1964), French racing driver
- Escarlata Bernard (born 1989), Spanish swimmer
- Eugene Bernard (1914–1973), English football goalkeeper
- Eulalia Bernard (1935–2021), Costa Rican writer, poet, and politician
- Evan Bernard, American advertising director

== F ==
- Felix Bernard (1897–1944), American conductor, pianist and composer
- Frances Bernard (1839–1926), British educator, Mistress of Girton College, Cambridge
- Francis Bernard (American football) (born 1995), American football player
- Francis Bernard (artist) (born 1928), French artist
- Francis Bernard (engineer) (born 1940), French founder and CEO of Dassault Systèmes
- Francis Bernard (judge) (1663–1731), Irish lawyer, politician and judge
- Francis Bernard (physician) (died 1698), English apothecary, physician and bibliophile
- Francis James Bernard (1796–1843), British chief of the Singapore Police Force
- Sir Francis Bernard, 1st Baronet (bapt.1712–1779), British Governor in New Jersey and Massachusetts
- Francis Bernard, 1st Earl of Bandon (1755–1830), Irish peer and politician
- Francis Bernard, 3rd Earl of Bandon (1810–1877), Irish peer and politician
- François Bernard-Valville (1767–1828), French playwright and librettist
- Françoise Bernard (1921–2021), French food writer and television presenter
- Frits Bernard (1920–2006), Dutch clinical psychologist and sexologist

== G ==
- Gabrielle Bernard (1893–1963), Belgian poet
- Gee Bernard (1934–2016), British politician from London
- George Bernard (died 1820), British Army officer
- George W. Bernard (born 1950), British historian
- Germie Bernard (born 2003), American football player
- Giovani Bernard (born 1991), American football player
- Günter Bernard (born 1939), German footballer

== H ==
- Harry Bernard (1878–1940), American actor and comedian
- H. Russell Bernard (Harvey Russell Bernard) (born 1940), American anthropologist and social scientist
- Heinz Bernard (1923–1994), British actor, director and theatre manager
- Henri Bernard (athlete) (1900–1967), French hurdler
- Henri Bernard (footballer) (1914–1942), Swiss footballer
- Henri Bernard (magistrate) (1899–1986), French judge
- Henry Bernard (architect) (1912–1994), French architect and urban planner
- Henry Boyle Bernard (1812–1895), Irish politician
- Henry Meyners Bernard (1853–1909), British biologist, carcinologist, palaeontologist and mathematician
- Herman Hedwig Bernard (1785–1857), English Hebraist
- Hewitt Bernard (1825–1893), Canadian lawyer and civil servant
- Hilda Bernard (1920–2022), Argentine actress
- Hugh Bernard (born 1996), English cricketer

== J ==
- Jacob Bernard-Docker (born 2000), Canadian ice hockey player
- Jacques Bernard (actor) (1929–2024), French actor
- Jacques Bernard (theologian) (1658–1718), French theologian and publicist in the Dutch Republic
- Jacques Antoine Bernard (1888–1952), French writer and literary editor
- James Bernard (composer) (1925–2001), British film music composer
- James Bernard (elocutionist) (1874–1946), British elocutionist, author and lay preacher
- James Bernard (engineer) (born 1943), American mechanical engineer
- James Bernard (politician) (1729–1790), Irish politician
- James Bernard, 2nd Earl of Bandon (1785–1856), Irish politician
- James Bernard, 4th Earl of Bandon (1850–1924), Irish representative peer
- Jami Bernard (born 1956), American author and film critic
- Janice Bernard (born 1958), Trinidadian sprinter
- Jarrick Bernard-Converse (born 2000), American football player
- Jason Bernard (1938–1996), American actor
- Jay Bernard (writer) (born 1988), British writer and activist
- Jean Bernard (physician) (1907–2006), French physician and haematologist
- Jean Bernard (priest) (1907–1994), Luxembourg Catholic priest
- Jean-Claude Bernard (1933–2022), French hurdler
- Jean-David Bernard (born 1977), French rower
- Jean-François Bernard (born 1962), French road bicycle racer
- Jean-Jacques Bernard (1888–1972), French playwright
- Jean-Louis Bernard (1938–2020), French politician
- Jean-Louis Bernard (author), French writer on mysticism and esotericism
- Jean-Michel Bernard (born 1961), French pianist and composer
- Jean-Pierre Bernard (1933–2017), French actor
- Jean-Toussaint Bernard (born 1980), French actor and screenwriter
- Jean Bernard-Luc (1909–1985), French screenwriter
- Jeanne Adèle Bernard (1868–1962), French couturier
- Jeff Bernard, American hydroplane driver
- Jeffrey Bernard (1932–1997), English journalist
- Jeremy Bernard (born 1961), American White House official
- Jérôme Bernard (born 1971), French racing cyclist
- Jessie Bernard (1903–1996), American sociologist and feminist scholar
- Joan Bernard (1918–2012), British academic and college head
- Joanne Bernard (born 1963), Canadian politician from Nova Scotia
- Joe Bernard (American football) (born c. 1963), American college football coach
- Joe Bernard (baseball) (1882–1960), American baseball pitcher
- Joel Bernard (born 1963), Canadian politician
- Joëlle Bernard (1928–1977), French film and television actress
- John Bernard (actor) (1756–1828), English actor and biographer
- John Bernard (author) (died 1554), English academic and religious author
- John Bernard (American politician) (1893–1983), American politician from Minnesota
- John Bernard (bishop) (1860–1927), Irish Anglican archbishop
- John Bernard (Ipswich MP) (died 1421), English Member of Parliament
- John Bernard (meteorologist) (1937–2024), Dutch meteorologist and weather presenter
- John Bernard (MP for Hythe) (fl.1374–1390), English Member of Parliament
- John Bernard (MP for Northampton) (1604–1674), English landowner and Member of Parliament
- John MacKay Bernard (1857–1919), Scottish brewer and philanthropist
- John Peter Bernard (died 1750), Anglo-French biographer
- Sir John Bernard, 2nd Baronet (1630–1679), English politician
- Jos Bernard (1924–2020), Luxembourgish gymnast
- Joseph Bernard (actor) (1923–2006), American actor
- Joseph Bernard (sculptor) (1866–1931), French sculptor
- Joseph Alphonsus Bernard (1881–1962), Canadian politician
- Joseph Karl Bernard (c.1781–1850), Austrian journalist and librettist
- Joseph E. Bernard (1880–1958), American character actor
- Judd Bernard (1927–2022), American film producer and screenwriter
- Jules Bernard (born 2000), American basketball player
- Julien Bernard (born 1992), French cyclist, son of Jean-François Bernard

== K ==
- Kaitlyn Bernard (born 2000), Canadian actress
- Karen Bernard, American choreographer and performance artist
- Karl Bernard (born 1964), American football player
- Karla Bernard, Canadian politician
- Kaye Bernard, Australian trade union leader and refugee advocate
- Kenneth Bernard (1930–2020), American author, poet and playwright
- Kenneth Bernard (public health officer), American public health physician and epidemiologist
- Kent Bernard (1942–2025), Trinidadian athlete
- Kieron Bernard (born 1985), Jamaican footballer
- Kurt Bernard (born 1977), Costa Rican footballer

== L ==
- Larry Bernard (born 1967), Canadian ice hockey player and scout
- Lauren Bernard (born 2001), American ice hockey player
- Laurent Bernard (born 1971), French basketball player
- Lawrence G. Bernard (1914–1997), United States Navy submarine commander
- Léonce Bernard (1943–2013), Canadian politician
- Linda Bernard (born 1950), British figure skater
- Lorenzo Bernard, Italian para-cyclist
- Louie Bernard, American politician from Louisiana
- Luc Bernard (born 1986), French game designer
- Lucas Bernard, American financial economist
- Ludlow Bernard, Jamaican football manager
- Ludovic Bernard, French film director
- Luther L. Bernard (1881–1951), American sociologist and psychologist

== M ==
- Mack Bernard (born 1976), Haitian-American politician from Florida
- Madame Bernard, French florist and flower merchant. She was the official royal purveyor to Emperor Napoleon I.
- Marc Bernard (1900–1983), French writer
- Marc Jean-Bernard (born 1952), French philosopher, writer and classical guitarist
- Marcel Bernard (1914–1994), French tennis player
- Maria Bernard (born 1993), Canadian track and field athlete in middle-distance events
- Marie Bernard, American physician and researcher
- Marie-Christine Bernard (born 1966), Canadian educator and writer
- Marie Françoise Bernard (1819–1901), French anti-vivisection campaigner
- Marie-Jeanne Bernard (1909–1979), Luxembourgish swimmer
- Mark Bernard (born 1969), Canadian ice hockey goaltender and coach
- Martyn Bernard (born 1984), British athlete
- Marvin Bernard, American rapper, better known by his stage name Tony Yayo
- Mary Gaines Bernard, American singer
- Mélanie Bernard (born 1974), Canadian tennis player
- Micah Bernard (born 2001), American football player
- Michael Bernard (born 1948), American basketball player and coach
- Michael Bernard (weightlifter) (born 1957), New Zealand weightlifter
- Michel Bernard (administrator) (born 1943), French administrator
- Michel Bernard (politician) (1932–2021), French politician
- Michel Bernard (runner) (1931–2019), French middle- and long-distance runner
- Michel Bernard (writer) (born 1958), French official and writer
- Micheline Bernard (born 1955), Canadian actress
- Michèle Bernard (born 1947), French singer and songwriter
- Michèle Bernard-Requin (1943–2019), French lawyer and magistrate
- Michelle Bernard (born 1963), American journalist, lawyer and author
- Michelle Bernard (actress), American actor and writer
- Mike Bernard (footballer) (born 1948), English footballer
- Mike Bernard (musician) (1875–1936), American musician
- Mike Bernard (painter) (born 1957), English painter
- Milly Bernard (1920–2005), American politician from Utah
- Molly Bernard, American actress
- Mountague Bernard (1820–1882), English international lawyer
- Muriel Bernard (born 1961), French sport shooter

== N ==
- Narada Bernard (born 1981), Jamaican-English footballer
- Nathalie Bernard (born 1985), New Zealand swimmer
- Natricia Bernard, British choreographer
- Neisha Bernard-Thomas (born 1981), Grenadian middle-distance runner
- Nicholas Bernard (c.1600–1661), Anglican priest and author in Ireland
- Nikhil Bernard (born 1989), Indian football goalkeeper
- Noël Bernard (botanist) (1874–1911), French botanist
- Noël Bernard (journalist) (1925–1981), Romanian journalist
- Noël Bernard (Malecite leader), figure in New Brunswick, Canada
- Nora Bernard (1935–2007), Canadian Mi'kmaq activist

== O ==
- Oliver Bernard (1925–2013), English poet and translator
- Oliver Percy Bernard (1881–1939), English architect and designer
- Olivier Bernard (born 1979), French footballer
- Olivier Bernard (athlete) (1921–1967), Swiss hurdler

== P ==
- Patricia Bernard (born 1942), Australian writer
- Paul Bernard (actor) (1898–1958), French actor
- Paul Bernard (archaeologist) (1929–2015), French archaeologist
- Paul Bernard (composer) (1827–1879), French composer
- Paul Bernard (director) (1929–1997), English television director and production designer
- Paul Bernard (footballer) (born 1972), Scottish footballer
- Percy Bernard (politician) (1844–1912), Irish politician
- Percy Bernard, 5th Earl of Bandon (1904–1979), Anglo-Irish nobleman and Royal Air Force commander
- Peter Bernard (fl.1716), Chief Justice of Jamaica
- Philip Bernard (fl.1786), Mi'kmaq chief in Nova Scotia
- Philip Bernard (MP) (died 1538/9), English Member of Parliament
- Pierre Bernard (comedian), American graphic designer and comedian
- Pierre Bernard (footballer) (1932–2014), French football goalkeeper
- Pierre Bernard (graphic designer) (1942–2015), French graphic designer
- Pierre Bernard (industrialist) (1922–1991), French industrialist
- Pierre Bernard (Montfermeil politician) (born 1934), French politician, mayor of Montfermeil
- Pierre Bernard (rugby union) (born 1989), French rugby footballer
- Pierre Bernard (Tarn politician) (1934–2020), French politician, mayor of Trébas
- Pierre Bernard (yogi) (1875–1955), American occultist
- Pierre Bernard-Reymond (born 1944), French politician
- Pierre-Joseph Bernard (1708–1775), French soldier, poet and librettist
- Prosper Bernard (1902–1943), Canadian Jesuit priest

== Q ==
- Quentin Bernard (born 1989), French footballer

== R ==
- Ralph Bernard (born 1953), British journalist and radio executive
- Randy Bernard (born 1967), American auto racing executive
- Raymond Bernard (esotericist) (1923–2006), French esotericist
- Raymond Bernard (filmmaker) (1891–1977), French film director and screenwriter
- Raymond W. Bernard (1903–1965), American esoteric writer
- René Bernard (1904–1969), French cyclist
- Reuben F. Bernard (1832–1903), United States Army officer
- Richard Bernard (1568–1641), English Puritan cleric and writer
- Richard Bernard (cricketer) (1938–1998), English cricketer
- Richard Bernard (Dean of Leighlin) (1787–1850), British politician, cleric and Dean of Leighlin
- Richard Bernard (MP for New Shoreham) (fl.1377–1395), English Member of Parliament
- Riese Bernard (born 1981), American writer and digital media executive
- Robert Bernard (advocate-general) (c.1808–1840), South Australian politician
- Robert Bernard (footballer) (1913–1990), German football player
- Robert J. Bernard (1894–1981), American academic administrator
- Sir Robert Bernard, 1st Baronet (1601–1666), English lawyer and politician
- Sir Robert Bernard, 3rd Baronet (died c. 1703), English politician
- Sir Robert Bernard, 5th Baronet (c.1740–1789), English politician
- Robyn Bernard (1959–c. 2024), American actress
- Rocky Bernard (born 1979), American football player
- Rod Bernard (1940–2020), American singer
- Roland K. Bernard (1916–1953), American college football player and coach
- Rukiya Bernard, Canadian actress, producer and interior designer

== S ==
- Sam Bernard (1863–1927), American vaudeville comedian
- Samuel Bernard (artist) (1615–1687), French miniature painter
- Samuel Bernard (financier) (1651–1739), French nobleman and financier
- Samuel Bernard (Jamaica) (fl.1679–1688), speaker of the House of Assembly of Jamaica
- Samuel-Jacques Bernard (1686–1753), son of Samuel Bernard the financier and bankrupt
- Saviour Bernard (1724–1806), Maltese medical practitioner and philosopher
- Scrope Bernard-Morland (1758–1830), British politician and baronet
- Sherman A. Bernard (1925–2012), American businessman and politician from Louisiana
- Simon Bernard (1779–1839), French general of engineers
- Simon François Bernard (1817–1862), French surgeon and revolutionary
- Spencer Bernard (songwriter), American songwriter, musician and record producer
- Spencer Bernard (politician) (1918–2001), American politician from Oklahoma
- Stephen Bernard (born 1975), British bibliographer
- Stephen Bernard (Irish MP), 18th-century Member of the Parliament of Ireland
- Steve Bernard (1947– 2009), American businessman
- Steve Bernard (cricketer) (born 1949), Australian cricketer and umpire
- Susan Bernard (1948–2019), American actress and author, daughter of Bruno Bernard
- Susan Bernard (politician), American politician from Maine
- Suzanne Bernard (1892–1910), French aviator

== T ==
- Terrel Bernard (born 1999), American football player
- Theos Casimir Bernard (1908–1947), American explorer and author
- Thierry Bernard-Gotteland (born 1974), French artist
- Thomas Bernard (1816–1882), Anglo-Irish British Army officer
- Thomas Bernard (Irish politician) (c.1769–1834), Irish politician
- Thomas Dehany Bernard (1815–1904), English Anglican cleric
- Sir Thomas Bernard, 3rd Baronet (1750–1818), English social reformer
- Sir Thomas Bernard, 6th Baronet (1791–1883), British politician
- Tom Bernard, American film distributor
- Tristan Bernard (1866–1947), French playwright and novelist
- Turner Bernard (born 1998), American football player

== U ==
- Uar Bernard (born 2004 or 2005), Nigerian football defensive tackle for the Philadelphia Eagles

== V ==
- Valère Bernard (1860–1936), French artist and writer from Provence
- Vivian Bernard (1868–1934), British Royal Navy officer

== W ==
- Walter Bernard (born 1978), American football player
- Wanda Thomas Bernard (born 1953), Canadian politician
- Will Bernard, American guitarist and band leader
- William Bernard (councillor) (c.1603–1665), English merchant in colonial Virginia
- William Bernard (sailor) (fl. 1849), sailor known as Barnacle Bill
- William Bayle Bernard (1807–1875), American-British playwright and drama critic
- William Larkins Bernard (1843–1922), English architect
- William Smyth Bernard (1792–1863), Irish politician
- Wynton Bernard (born 1990), American baseball player

== Y ==
- Yohann Bernard (born 1974), French swimmer
- Yvenson Bernard (born 1984), American football player
- Yvonne Bernard (born 1959), American film and television producer

== Z ==
- Zénon Bernard (1893–1942), Luxembourgish communist politician

== See also ==
- George and Bert Bernard, American comedy duo
- de Bernard de Marigny
- St. Bernard (surname)
- Barend, Barends, Barnard, Behrendt, Bendt, Bent, Berend, Berent Berendt, Behrent, Bernard, Bernhard, Bernhardt, Bernd, Bernt, Berndt
- Benard, Bénard, Besnard, Berardi, Bernardi, Bernardin, Bernardini, Bernardino, Bernardo, Bernardoni, Bernardy
- Template:Bear-surname
