= Philip Bernard (disambiguation) =

Philip Bernard (fl. 1786) was a Mi'kmaq chief.

Phil(l)ip Bernard may also refer to:

- Philip Bernard (MP) (died 1530s), MP for Great Yarmouth
- Phillip Bernard (wrestler) (1890–1975), real name Bernard Bernard

== See also ==
- Philip Barnard (disambiguation)
