= Jean-Bernard =

Jean-Bernard is a French masculine given name. It may refer to:

- Jean-Bernard Gauthier de Murnan (1748–1796), a French officer for the Continental Army
- Jean-Bernard Knepper (1638–1698), a Luxembourg advocat and notary
- Jean-Bernard Ndongo Essomba, a Cameroonian politician
- Jean-Bernard Racine (born 1940), a Swiss Professor of geography
- Jean-Bernard Raimond (1926–2016), a conservative French politician
- Jean-Bernard Restout (1732–1797), a French painter
- Jean Bernard Sindeu, a Cameroonian politician

== See also ==
- Jean Bernard (disambiguation)
- Jean-Bernard, abbé Le Blanc (1707–1781), a French art critic
- Marc Jean-Bernard (born 1952), a French/American philosopher, classical musician and musicologist
- Gouffre Jean-Bernard, one of the deepest known caves in the world
