= James Bernard =

James Bernard may refer to:

- James Bernard (composer) (1925–2001), British composer
- James Bernard (elocutionist) (1874–1946), British elocutionist
- James Bernard (engineer) (born 1943), American mechanical engineer
- James Bernard (journalist) (1965–2024), American music journalist
- James Bernard (politician) (1729–1790), Irish MP for Cork County
- James Bernard, 4th Earl of Bandon (1850–1924), Irish representative peer and Lord Lieutenant of Cork
- James Bernard, 2nd Earl of Bandon (1785–1856)
