= Michel Bernard =

Michel Bernard may refer to:

- Michel Bernard (runner) (1931–2019), French Olympic runner
- Michel Bernard (politician) (1932–2021), French politician
- Michel Bernard (administrator) (born 1943), French administrator
- Michel Bernard (writer) (born 1958), French senior official and writer

== See also ==
- Michel-Marie-Bernard Calvet (born 1944), French-born New Caledonian archbishop
