= Arthur Bernard =

Arthur Bernard may refer to:

- Arthur Bernard (footballer) (1915–1984), Luxembourgish footballer
- Arthur Bernard (author) (1940–2022), French author, historian, and essayist
