= Philip Barnard =

Philip Barnard may refer to:

- Philip Augustus Barnard (1813–1897), British painter
- Philip Barnard (MP) (born by 1492), English MP

== See also ==
- Philip Bernard (disambiguation)
