= Henry Bernard =

Harry or Henry Bernard may refer to:

- Henry Boyle Bernard (1812–1895), Irish Conservative Party politician, MP for Bandon 1863–68
- Henry Meyners Bernard (1853–1909), English biologist, mathematician and cleric
- Harry Bernard (1878–1940), American film comedy actor with Mack Sennett and Hal Roach
- Henry Bernard (architect) (1912–1994), French urban planner, designed Palace of Europe
