= David Bernard =

David Bernard may refer to:

- David Bernard (cricketer) (born 1981), West Indian cricketer
- David Bernard (conductor) (born 1964), American conductor, pianist and clarinettist
- Dave Bernard (American football) (1912–1973), former NFL player
- David K. Bernard (born 1956), American theologian
- David Bernard (meteorologist) (born 1969), American television meteorologist
