= Wachenheim (disambiguation) =

Wachenheim is a small town in the Bad Dürkheim district in Rhineland-Palatinate, Germany.

Wachenheim may also refer to:

== Places ==
- Wachenheim, Alzey-Worms, a municipality belonging to a Verbandsgemeinde, a kind of collective municipality – in the Alzey-Worms district in Rhineland-Palatinate, Germany
- Wachenheim (Verbandsgemeinde), Bad Dürkheim, Rhineland-Palatinate, Germany

== People ==
- Edgar Wachenheim III (born 1937), American investor
- Michel Wachenheim (born 1951), French ambassador
