= Arpan, South Dakota =

Unincorporated community in South Dakota, U.S.

Coordinates: 44°47′18″N 103°38′57″W

Arpan is an unincorporated community in Butte County, in the U.S. state of South Dakota.

== History ==
Arpan was platted in 1910, and named for a local family. A post office called Arpan was in operation from 1911 until 1940.

== Notable people ==
- Lawrence G. Bernard, U.S. Navy Rear Admiral and World War II submariner
