= Jean Bernard =

Jean Bernard may refer to:

- Jean Bernard (physician) (1907–2006), French hematologist
- Jean Bernard (priest) (1907–1994), Catholic priest who survived the Nazi concentration camp at Dachau
- Jean-François Bernard (born 1962), former French professional road bicycle racer

== See also ==
- Jean-Bernard, a French masculine given name
