= St. Bernard (surname) =

St. Bernard is a surname, and may refer to:

- Andrea St. Bernard (born 1979), Grenadian taekwondo competitor
- Donna-Michelle St. Bernard, Canadian playwright, theatre director and arts administrator
- Selwyn St. Bernard (born 1977) is a Trinidad and Tobago rugby union and rugby league footballer

== See also ==
- Bernard (surname)
