= Directorate General for Civil Aviation (France) =

French civil aviation authority

- Direction générale de l'Aviation civile
- Abbreviation: DGAC
- Formation: 1946
- Purpose: Aviation regulator
- Location: 50 rue Henry Farman, Paris
- Region served: France
- Director general: Damien Cazé
- Parent organization: Ministère de la Transition écologique
- Website: www.ecologie.gouv.fr/direction-generale-laviation-civile-dgac

The Directorate General for Civil Aviation (French: Direction générale de l'aviation civile, DGAC) is the French civil aviation authority. Its headquarters are in the 15th arrondissement of Paris, 50 Henry-Farman. It is subordinate to the Ministry of Ecology, Sustainable Development and Energy.

The DGAC levies a civil aviation tax on several flights operating from France.

== History ==
DGAC Headquarters, 50 rue Henry-Farman, Paris 15th arr.

The Secretariat General for Civil and Commercial Aviation (SGACC) was formed on 12 September 1946 by the Ministry of Transport and Public Works. The first secretary general of the newly-formed organisation was Max Hymans (1900-1961), who had been named to the post nine months previously in December 1945.

The SGACC then formed the Light and Sport Aviation Office (SALS) to cover flying clubs and instructors. In 1955 SALS became the Aeronautic Instruction and Aerial Sport Service (SFASA).

From 1971 to 1976 the secretary general was Maurice Grimaud.

In 1976, following the removal of the post of secretary general across the French Civil Service, the SGAC was renamed the DGAC. Subsequent directors general include Michel Bernard (1993) and Michel Wachenheim (2002-7).

In 1993 the headquarters of the organisation moved from 93 Boulevard du Montparnasse, that had been its home since its foundation in 1946, to its present site on Rue Henry-Farman.

In 2013, together with ENAC, DGAC created DSNA Services, which became France Aviation Civile Services in 2019, an expertise office to sell French know-how in the field of regulations, air transport safety and air navigation.

== See also ==
- Ingénieur des études et de l'exploitation de l'aviation civile
- Technicien supérieur des études et de l'exploitation de l'aviation civile
- Bureau d'Enquêtes et d'Analyses pour la Sécurité de l'Aviation Civile - The French air accident investigation agency
