= Billy Bernard =

Luxembourgish international footballer

Personal information
- Date of birth: 9 April 1991 (age 35)
- Position: Defender

Team information
- Current team: The Belval Belvaux
- Number: 2

Senior career*
Years	Team	Apps	(Gls)
2008–2021	CS Fola Esch	174	(7)
2021–2023	Mondercange	24	(0)
2023–	The Belval Belvaux	42	(4)

International career^{‡}
2010–2013	Luxembourg	2	(0)
- * Club domestic league appearances and goals as of 5 June 2026 ‡ National team caps and goals as of 1 June 2024

Billy Bernard (born 9 April 1991) is a Luxembourgish international footballer who plays for The Belval Belvaux, as a defender.
