= Prosper Bernard =

Canadian missionary

Prosper Bernard, S.J. 那士荣 (Nà Shì Róng)
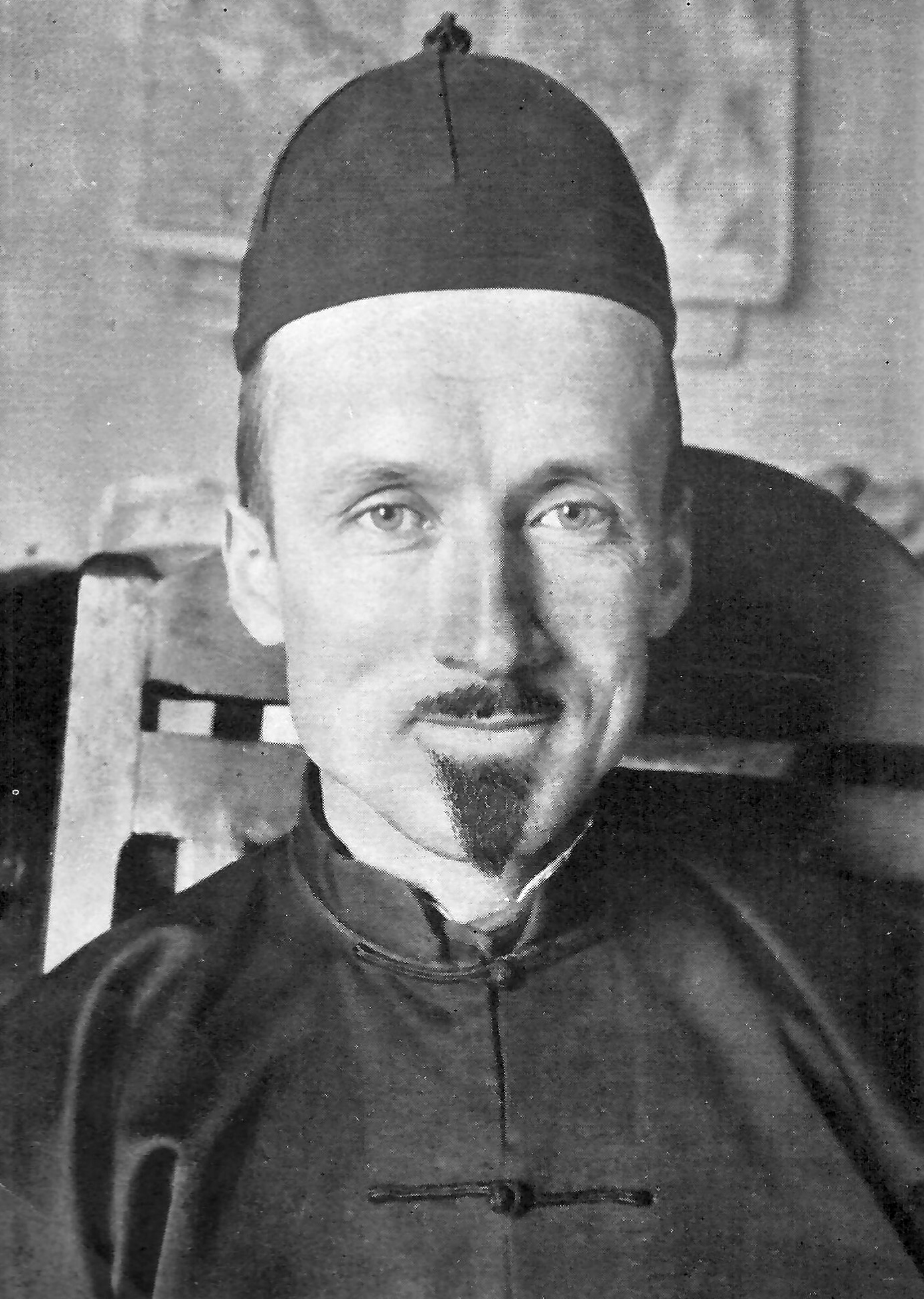
- Born: May 25, 1902; Canada
- Died: March 18, 1943 (aged 40); Fengxian District, Shanghai, China

Prosper Bernard, S.J. (in Chinese: 那士荣; pinyin: Nà Shì Róng) (May 25, 1902 – March 18, 1943) was a Canadian Jesuit priest who was executed by a Japanese officer in China in 1943.

== Biography ==
In 1935, he became a Jesuit priest of the Roman Catholic Church. He left for China in January 1938, a week after Dr. Norman Bethune, the famous Canadian medical doctor. In China, he took the Chinese name of Nà Shì Róng. At that time, Japan was occupying part of China. On December 8, 1941, he was both director of the school of Taolou and that village's pastor when Canada, the United States, and Britain declared war on Japan following the attack on Pearl Harbor. He was immediately arrested and brought to Fengxian, 10 kilometers (6.2 mi) away, and put in house arrest in the church compound with two other Canadian priests, fellow French-Canadian missionaries Jesuits Alphonse Dube and Armand Lalonde. These three Canadian priests continued to operate a school from inside that same church compound in Fengxian. On March 18, 1943, they were executed by a Japanese officer for trying to preserve the school. In 1990, the people of Fengxian erected a monument to their memory.
