= Lucas Bernard =

American economist

Lucas M. Bernard
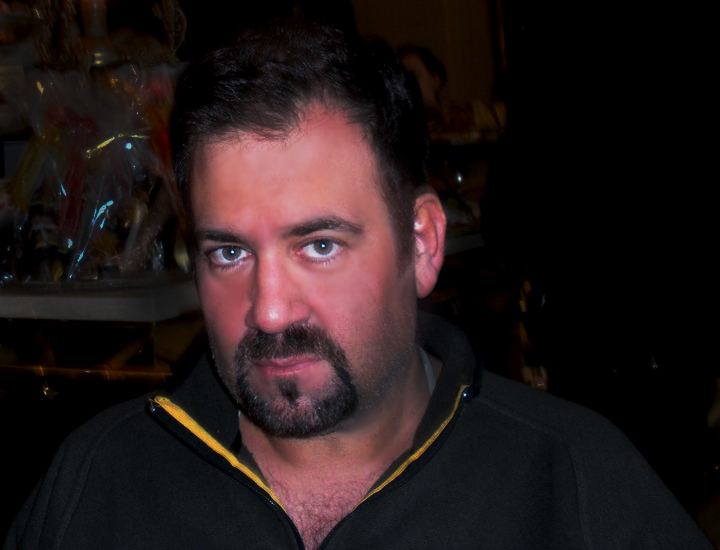
- Born: New York City, United States
- Citizenship: United States
- Education: New School University; City College of New York; Courant Institute of Mathematical Sciences
- Scientific career
- Fields: Economics
- Workplaces: New York City College of Technology; New School University

Lucas Bernard is an American financial economist and a member of the Board of Trustees of the Henry George School of Social Science. He is also the chairman of the New York City College of Technology. City Tech, as it is known, is part of the City University of New York and is the largest public, undergraduate college of technology in the Northeastern United States. He grew up in New York City and is the son of playwright Kenneth Bernard and Elaine Ceil Reiss.

Professor Bernard's recent research has moved away from the traditional mathematical models, popular with economists, and more towards the role of economics as a sub-discipline of sociology. Bernard is interested in the ways in which economics blends together human values, politics, rationality and irrationality; more specifically, how this interplay reveals itself in society at large. He is an Advisory Editor in Economics and Finance for Oxford University Press.

His doctoral dissertation, concerning endogenous models of credit default, was written at The New School for Social Research under Willi Semmler. He also holds graduate degrees in mathematics from the City College of New York and computer science from the Courant Institute of Mathematical Sciences at New York University.
