= Wynton Bernard =

American baseball player (born 1990)

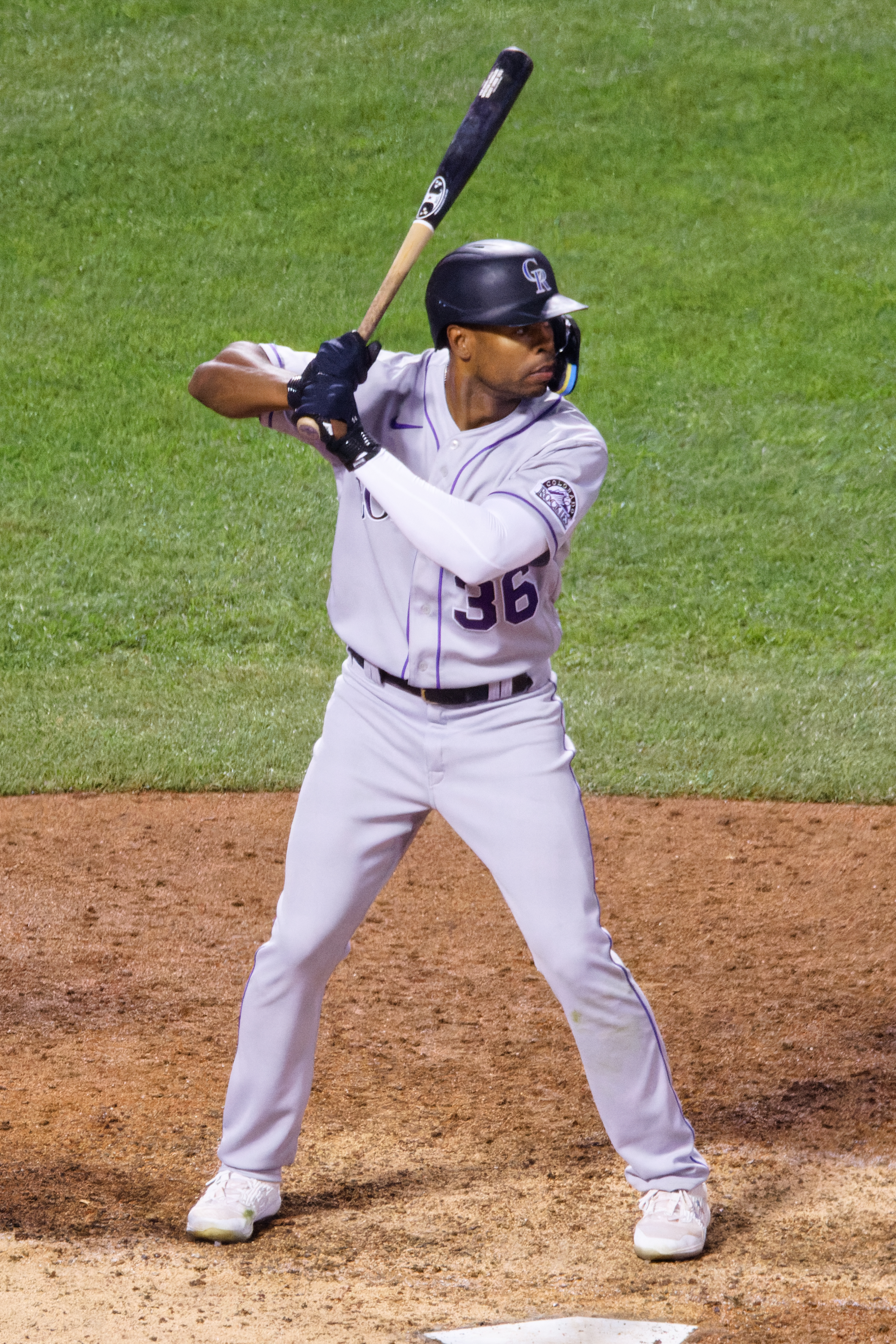
- Bernard with the Rockies in 2022

El Águila de Veracruz – No. 56
- Outfielder
- Born: September 24, 1990 (age 35); San Diego, California, U.S.
- Bats: Right Throws: Right

MLB debut
- August 12, 2022, for the Colorado Rockies

MLB statistics (through 2022 season)
- Batting average: .286
- Home runs: 0
- Runs batted in: 3
- Stats at Baseball Reference

Teams
- Colorado Rockies (2022)

Wynton Allen Bernard (born September 24, 1990) is an American professional baseball outfielder for El Águila de Veracruz of the Mexican League. He has previously played in Major League Baseball (MLB) for the Colorado Rockies.

== Amateur career ==
Bernard attended Rancho Bernardo High School in Poway, California. He received an athletic scholarship to attend Niagara University and play college baseball for the Niagara Purple Eagles. As a freshman, Bernard had a .293 batting average and led the team in stolen bases. He transferred to Riverside Community College after the season because his father had a stroke and he wanted to be closer to his family. Bernard's father died after his sophomore year, and he transferred back to Niagara for his junior year. For Niagara, Bernard compiled a .279 average and 72 stolen bases in 140 games from 2009 to 2012.

== Professional career ==
=== San Diego Padres ===
The San Diego Padres selected Bernard in the 35th round, with the 1,065th overall selection, of the 2012 Major League Baseball draft. He made his professional debut with the rookie–level Arizona League Padres, hitting .232 across 23 games. In 2013, Bernard split the season between the AZL Padres, Low–A Eugene Emeralds, Single–A Fort Wayne TinCaps, and High–A Lake Elsinore Storm. In 51 total games, he accumulated a .251/.325/.331 batting line with 1 home run, 16 RBI, and 10 stolen bases. On January 23, 2014, Bernard was released by the Padres organization.

=== Detroit Tigers ===
On March 3, 2014, Bernard signed a minor league contract with the Detroit Tigers organization. He played for the Low-A West Michigan Whitecaps in 2014, and was named the Most Valuable Player of the Midwest League after hitting .324 with 6 home runs, 47 RBI, and 45 stolen bases across 131 contests. He additionally broke the team's single season hit record with 164. On October 31, 2014, the Tigers added Bernard to their 40-man roster to protect him from the Rule 5 draft.

Bernard played for the Double-A Erie SeaWolves in 2015. In 135 games, he batted .302/.352/.408 with 4 home runs, 36 RBI, and 43 stolen bases. Bernard was optioned to the Triple-A Toledo Mud Hens to begin the season. On June 18, 2016, Bernard was designated for assignment by the Tigers following the promotion of Casey McGehee. He cleared waivers and was sent outright to Double–A on June 24. In 104 total games for Erie and Toledo, he batted .279/.345/.396 with a career–high 7 home runs, 33 RBI, and 23 stolen bases. He became a free agent after the season on November 7.

=== San Francisco Giants ===
On November 18, 2016, Bernard signed a minor league contract with the San Francisco Giants organization.

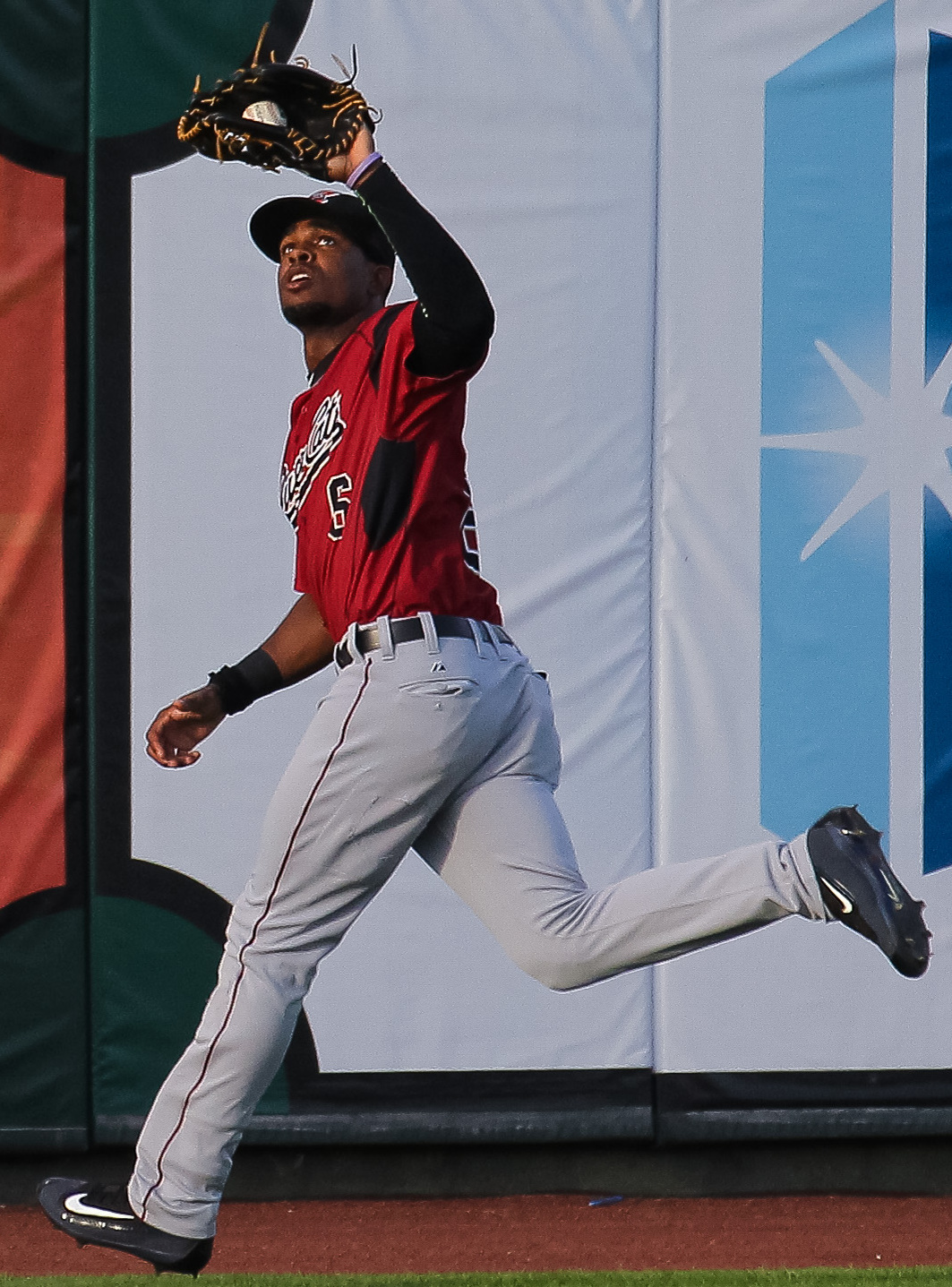
Bernard with the Sacramento River Cats in 2017

In 82 games for the Triple–A Sacramento River Cats, he hit .254/.303/.347 with 2 home runs, 14 RBI, and 13 stolen bases. Bernard elected free agency following the season on November 6, 2017.

=== Chicago Cubs ===
On January 29, 2018, Bernard signed a minor league contract with the Chicago Cubs organization. He split the season between the Double–A Tennessee Smokies and Triple–A Iowa Cubs, playing 98 total games and hitting .242/.293/.349 with 3 home runs, 22 RBI, and 25 stolen bases. Bernard elected free agency following the season on November 2.

On November 22, 2018, Bernard re–signed with the Cubs on a minor league contract. In 52 games for split between Tennessee and Iowa in 2019, he hit .278/.359/.444 with 2 home runs, 15 RBI, and 8 stolen bases. Bernard was released by the Cubs organization on July 11, 2019.

=== Sugar Land Skeeters ===
On July 15, 2019, Bernard signed with the Sugar Land Skeeters of the Atlantic League of Professional Baseball. In 61 games, Bernard slashed .314/.353/.461 with 6 home runs, 36 RBI, and 32 stolen bases. On March 4, 2020, Bernard re–signed with the Skeeters for the 2020 season.

After the 2020 Atlantic League season was cancelled due to the COVID-19 pandemic, Bernard joined the Skeeters in the Constellation Energy League. In 23 games, he hit .270/.325/.378 with 2 home runs, 9 RBI, and 6 stolen bases.

=== Colorado Rockies ===
On January 19, 2021, Bernard signed a minor league contract with the Colorado Rockies organization. He spent the season with the Triple-A Albuquerque Isotopes, playing in 100 games and batting .254/.319/.395 with 7 home runs, 30 RBI, and 23 stolen bases. He elected free agency following the season on November 7. On February 1, 2022, Bernard re–signed with the Rockies on a new minor league contract. In 108 games for Albuquerque, he hit .333/.387/.590 with career–highs in home runs (21) and RBI (92), as well as 30 stolen bases.

On August 11, 2022, it was announced that Bernard would be promoted to the major leagues for the first time. The following day, his contract was officially selected to the active roster. He made his major-league debut against the Arizona Diamondbacks that evening, recording a hit, stolen base, and run scored. After recording a base hit and a stolen base, he became the oldest player to do so in their major league debut since 1907. In 12 major league games for Colorado, Bernard hit .286/.286/.310 with no home runs, 3 RBI, and 3 stolen bases. On November 9, Bernard was removed from the 40-man roster and sent outright to Triple–A. He elected free agency the following day.

=== Toronto Blue Jays ===
On January 24, 2023, Bernard signed a minor league contract with the Toronto Blue Jays organization. Bernard played in 60 games for the Triple–A Buffalo Bisons, hitting .271/.360/.393 with 3 home runs, 31 RBI, and 15 stolen bases. He was released by Toronto on June 28.

=== Colorado Rockies (second stint) ===
On June 29, 2023, Bernard signed a minor league contract with the Colorado Rockies organization. In 66 games for the Triple–A Albuquerque Isotopes, he hit .329/.388/.484 with 8 home runs, 34 RBI, and 26 stolen bases. Bernard elected free agency following the season on November 6.

=== Chicago White Sox ===
On November 28, 2023, Bernard signed a minor league contract with the Chicago White Sox. In 41 games for the Triple–A Charlotte Knights, he batted .306/.328/.446 with three home runs, 14 RBI, and 11 stolen bases. Bernard was released by the White Sox organization on July 8, 2024.

=== Minnesota Twins ===
On July 10, 2024, Bernard signed a minor league contract with the Minnesota Twins. In 32 games for the Triple–A St. Paul Saints, he slashed .248/.300/.357 with two home runs, 15 RBI, and 12 stolen bases. On August 24, Bernard was released by the Twins organization.

=== Leones de Yucatán ===
On March 16, 2025, Bernard signed with the Leones de Yucatán of the Mexican League. He made 63 appearances for Yucatán, batting .312/.410/.451 with seven home runs, 33 RBI, and 21 stolen bases.

Bernard played in 27 games for the Leones in 2026, slashing .263/.317/.305 with 12 RBI and four stolen bases. On May 26, 2026, Bernard was released by Yucatán.

=== El Águila de Veracruz ===
On May 29, 2026, Bernard signed with El Águila de Veracruz of the Mexican League.

== International career ==
In addition to playing for various minor-league teams in the United States, Bernard has also played professionally in Mexico, Venezuela, the Dominican Republic, and Australia.

== Personal life ==
Bernard has two older brothers: Walter played for the New Mexico Lobos in college and in the National Football League, and Wayne played professional basketball in Europe.

Bernard appeared on the TV game show Family Feud alongside his brother Walter in 2011.
