= Jean-Louis Bernard (author) =

French author

- Born: Burkina Faso
- Writing career
- Language: French
- Subjects: Esotericism and religion
- Notable work: L'initiation d'un soufi (The initiation of a sufi)

Jean-Louis Bernard is a French author. He writes about mysticism and esotericism.

== Studies ==
He studies the German language and audio-visual technology in La Sorbonne in Paris and earned a Master of Educational Sciences at Paris-Descartes University. He learned staging with actor and stage director Jean-Louis Barrault at Théâtre du Rond Point in Paris.

== Career ==
=== Editor ===
President of Emergences Littéraires et Artistiques : literary director, publisher, in the 90s he edited several books: Poems from Anne Vinh, Empire Céleste, and from Basile Gonnord, La raison d’être. Bernard published various texts, among them a collective work with authors as France Curat, Basile Gonnord, and illustrated by Sigrid Hagel.

=== Journalist ===
La Vie magazine publishes his interviews with writers including, Régine Deforges, Hector Bianciotti, Jean-Marie Pelt, and a novel En suivant l’étoile.

=== Speaker ===
He appears regularly at the Forum of Club Méditerranée, in France, Greece, Morocco, and Portugal. He offers series of conferences and seminars of one week about reincarnation, dream interpretation in Paris and in Fort-de-France (Martinique)

== Works ==
- Nô, theater piece at Emergences editions *Co-author with Bernard Duboy of :
- Les autres vies et la réincarnation, essai, éditions du Rocher, 1992
- A reencarnação e as vidas anteriores, en portugais éditions Estampa 1993
- Mehdi l'initiation d'un soufi, éditions du Rocher, 1994
- Mehdi l'initiation d'un soufi édition de poche Pocket 1997
- Sogni nel deserto (una iniziazione Sufi) en italien éditions Xenia 1997
- Contributed to collective work Il Sofà delle fusa (40 accademici raccontano i loro gatti) éditions Felinamente 1999
