= Samuel Bernard (artist) =

French painter (1615–1687)

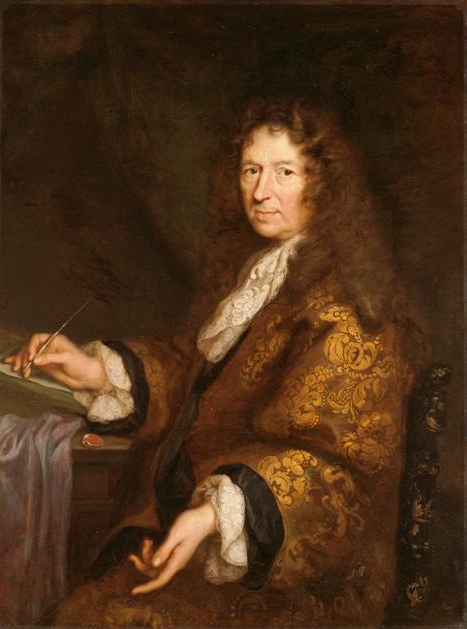
Portrait by Louis Ferdinand Elle the Elder, 1681

Samuel Bernard (1615–1687), also known as Jacques-Samuel Bernard was a French miniature painter and engraver.

== Life ==
Born to a Protestant family in Paris in 1615, he was the son of Noel Bernard, a painter. He was a pupil of both Simon Vouet and of Louis du Guernier, and began his artistic career painting frescos. Bernard moved on to painting miniatures before finally devoting himself entirely to engraving. Some still lifes, painted in the early 1660s, are also known.

He joined the Académie Royale de Peinture et de Sculpture on its foundation in 1648 and became a professor there in 1655. He was expelled on religious grounds in 1681, but restored to his post following his recantation of Protestantism four years later.

He died in Paris in 1687. The financier Samuel Bernard was his son.

== Works ==
He engraved plates, both in line and in mezzotint. They include:

=== Line engravings ===
- Charles Louis, Duke of Bavaria; after van Dyck.
- Louis du Guernier, miniature painter.
- Philip, Count of Bethune.
- Anne Tristan de la Beaume de Luze, Archbishop of Paris; after De Troy.
- The Apparition of St. Peter and St. Paul to Attila; after Raphael. His best work.
- The Young Astyanax discovered by Ulysses in the Tomb of Hector; after Bourdon.
- The Crucifixion; after Ph. de Champagne.
- The Virgin Mary, with the dead Christ; after the same.
- The Ascension; after the same.
- An allegorical subject of Concord.
- The Flight into Egypt; after Guido.

=== Mezzotints ===
- The Portrait of Louis XIV; oval.
- Sebastian, le Prestre de Vauban; after F. de Troy.
- The Nativity; after Rembrandt.
- A Herdsman driving Cattle.
- An Ox Market; after B. Castiglione.
- The Kepose; called La Zingara; after Correggio.
