= De Bernard de Marigny =

de Bernard de Marigny is a surname, and may refer to:

- Charles de Bernard de Marigny (1740–1816), French vice admiral
- Charles Louis de Bernard de Marigny (died 1782), French naval officer, elder brother of the vice admiral
- Gaspard de Bernard de Marigny (1754–1794) French naval officer and commander of insurgents in the Vendée

== See also ==
- Bernard de Marigny
