= Walter Bernard =

American football player (born 1978)

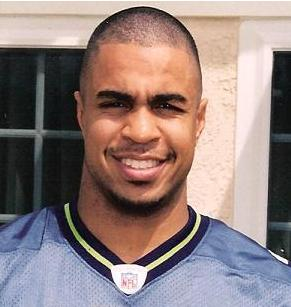

No. 23, 39, 30
- Position: Defensive back

Personal information
- Born: May 3, 1978 (age 48); San Diego, California, U.S.
- Listed height: 6 ft 2 in (1.88 m)
- Listed weight: 215 lb (98 kg)

Career information
- High school: Rancho Buena Vista (Vista, California)
- College: New Mexico (1998-2000)
- NFL draft: 2001: undrafted

Career history
- San Diego Chargers (2001)*; Frankfurt Galaxy (2002); Indianapolis Colts (2002)*; Seattle Seahawks (2002–2003)
- * Offseason or practice squad member only

Career NFL statistics
- Games played: 1
- Stats at Pro Football Reference

Walter Bernard (born May 3, 1978) is an American former professional football player who was a defensive back in the National Football League (NFL). He played college football for the New Mexico Lobos. He played professionally from 2001 to 2005. He was signed by the San Diego Chargers as an undrafted free agent in 2001. He played professionally for the Chargers, Indianapolis Colts and Seattle Seahawks of the NFL.

== Early life ==
Bernard was born in San Diego, California. He attended Poway High School in Poway, California, through his junior year, where he played baseball and lettered in both track and field and basketball. For his senior year, Bernard transferred to Rancho Buena Vista High School in Vista, California. There, after playing his first year of organized football, he was selected first team All Palomar and first team All San Diego County, and received a Division I scholarship. Bernard is the first athlete to make an NFL roster from Rancho Buena Vista High School.

== College career ==
Bernard played college football at the University of New Mexico, where he majored in university studies with an emphasis in filmmaking. Bernard was a four-year letterman and three-year starter for the Lobos, playing under head coaches Dennis Franchione (1997) and Rocky Long (1998–2000). Bernard finished his collegiate career with six interceptions and was selected to the All-Mountain West Team his junior and senior seasons. Bernard was a teammate of future Chicago Bears linebacker Brian Urlacher.

== Professional career ==
Bernard signed with the San Diego Chargers as an undrafted free agent in 2001. Eventually, the Chargers released him during the 2001 season. He was signed by the Indianapolis Colts late 2001, and then sent to play for the Frankfurt Galaxy of NFL Europe. After playing for the Galaxy, Bernard went back to Indianapolis in 2002 under new head coach Tony Dungy. The Colts converted Bernard from a cornerback to a free safety. During the 2002 season, Bernard was released and picked up by the Seattle Seahawks. Bernard finished out his career with the Seattle Seahawks and officially retired in 2005 due to injuries. Bernard primarily played on special teams and was used as both a cornerback and safety for the Seahawks.

== Personal life ==
Bernard graduated from Howard University School of Business and Howard University School of Law in 2010, where he received his JD/MBA. Bernard is a practicing lawyer and is a member of the New York and New Jersey State bars.

Bernard has three brothers, Mike, Wayne and Wynton. Bernard's oldest brother, Mike, was a standout high jumper for Southern Illinois University and was one of the first seven-foot jumpers in the state of Illinois. Bernard's younger brother, Wayne, is a professional basketball player in Europe and was a standout basketball player at Davidson College. Wayne has signed NBA contracts with the Sacramento Kings and the Toronto Raptors. Bernard's youngest brother, Wynton has played in Major League Baseball for the Colorado Rockies.

During the 2011 season of Family Feud, Bernard appeared as a contestant with his brother Wynton, with host Steve Harvey.

Bernard was a model for Harley Davidson and appeared in their national advertisement campaign.
