= Emily Bernard =

American writer (born 1967)

- Born: 1967 (age 58–59); Nashville, Tennessee, United States
- Education: Yale University
- Employer: University of Vermont
- Notable work: Black is the Body: Stories from My Grandmother’s Time, My Mother’s Time, and Mine (2019)
- Awards: Christopher Isherwood Prize for Autobiographical Prose

Emily Bernard (born 1967) is an American writer and the Julian Lindsay Green and Gold Professor of English at the University of Vermont. She is a contributing editor to The American Scholar.

== Early life and education ==
Emily Bernard was born in Nashville, Tennessee, United States. She earned a BA and a PhD in American Studies from Yale University.

== Publications ==
The 2004 anthology Some of My Best Friends: Writings on Interracial Friendships, was edited and introduced by Bernard. She is the author of books including Carl Van Vechten and the Harlem Renaissance: A Portrait in Black and White (2010) and Black Is the Body: Stories from My Grandmother's Time, My Mother's Time, and Mine, which won the Christopher Isherwood Prize for Autobiographical Prose in 2019. The essay collection Black Is the Body was among Maureen Corrigan's "Favorite Books of 2019", and Kirkus Reviews described it as "A rare book of healing on multiple levels."

== Awards and recognition ==
- 2001: The New York Times Notable Book of the Year for Remember Me to Harlem: The Letters of Langston Hughes and Carl Van Vechten
- 2006: New York Public Library as a Book for the Teen Age for Some of My Best Friends: Writers on Interracial Friendship
- 2008–09: James Weldon Johnson Fellowship in African American Studies, Beinecke Rare Book and Manuscript Library
- 2010: NAACP Image Award for Outstanding Literary Work for Michelle Obama: The First Lady in Photographs
- 2019: Los Angeles Times – Christopher Isherwood Prize for Autobiographical Prose, for Black is the Body: Stories from My Grandmother’s Time, My Mother’s Time, and Mine

== Selected works ==
- Remember Me to Harlem: The Letters of Langston Hughes and Carl Van Vechten (2001), Alfred A. Knopf
- Some of My Best Friends: Writings on Interracial Friendships (2004), Amistad/HarperCollins, ISBN 0-06-008276-3
- Michelle Obama: The First Lady in Photographs with Deborah Willis (2009), W. W. Norton
- Carl Van Vechten and the Harlem Renaissance: A Portrait in Black and White (2010), Yale University Press
- Black is the Body: Stories from My Grandmother’s Time, My Mother’s Time, and Mine (2019), Alfred A. Knopf
