= Brad Bernard =

American football player and coach (born 1966)

Biographical details
- Born: November 1, 1966 (age 59); Jacksonville, Florida, U.S.

Playing career
- 1985–1989: Georgia Southern
- Position: Center

Coaching career (HC unless noted)
- 1990: Georgia Southern (assistant)
- 1991–1994: Sandalwood HS (FL) (assistant)
- 1994–1996: Mandarin HS (FL) (assistant)
- 1997: William M. Raines HS (FL) (assistant)
- 1998–2009: Bethune–Cookman (assistant)
- 2010: Howard (assistant)
- 2011–2012: Edward Waters

Head coaching record
- Overall: 11–11

Brad C. Bernard (born 1966) is an American football coach and former player. He served as the head football coach at Edward Waters College from 2011 to 2012.

== Playing career ==
Bernard was a four-year letterman at Georgia Southern University before graduating in 1991. While at Georgia Southern, Bernard helped the Eagles to four NCAA Division I-AA National Championships in 1985, 1986, 1989, and 1990 as the Strength and Conditioning Coach under former GSU head coach Erk Russell.

== Coaching career ==
Bernard began his coaching career at Sandalwood High School in 1991 where he coached one All-State player. In 1994, Bernard was hired to be the offensive line coach at Mandarin High School, where he helped produce 3 All-State players for the Mustangs. Bernard took his coaching talents to William M. Raines High School in 1997, where was named offensive coordinator under head coach Welton Coffey, III. Bernard, Coffey, and the rest of the Vikings made history for the city of Jacksonville, going 15-0 and winning the 1997 FHSAA Class 4-A State Championship, a championship currently remains as the last state football title for a Duval County public school. Bernard's offense at Raines in ’97 led the FHSAA in total offense and most points scored. While at Raines, Bernard coached eight All-FHSAA players, among those were future NFL All-Pros Lito Sheppard and Jabar Gaffney of the New England Patriots, as well as former Edward Waters quarterback Mack Frazier.

Bernard had arguably his greatest success as a coach at Bethune-Cookman University, where he spent 11 seasons under head coach and fellow Jacksonville native and current Edward Waters interim head coach Alvin Wyatt. While at B-CU, Bernard compiled an 83–50 record and as a coach and also coached 18 All-MEAC players. Chief among them are current Edward Waters Assistant Offensive Line Coach Vernon Edwards, Julius Franklin (New York Giants/Orlando Predators) as well as three NFL All-Pro Selections, most notably, Eric Weems of the Chicago Bears, Rashean Mathis of the Jacksonville Jaguars, and Super Bowl XLV champion Nick Collins of the Green Bay Packers among others. Bernard began his career at B-CU in 1998 as the offensive line coach and co-offensive coordinator for the Wildcats, where was one of the architects of the infamous “Wyatt Bone” option offense. In that ‘98 season, the Wildcats finished 8–3, their best record since 1989, and earned a berth in the Heritage Bowl. In the 2002 season Bernard and the Wildcats finished with a school record 11 wins, won the Mid-Eastern Athletic Conference Championship, and made the school's first ever appearance in the NCAA Division I Football Championship Subdivision (formerly Division I-AA) Playoffs.

Bernard also spent the 2010 season as offensive coordinator at Howard University.

In his first season as head coach at Edward Waters in 2011, Bernard led the Tigers to their first non-losing record since 2004, going 5–5.

== Head coaching record ==
Year	Team	Overall	Conference	Standing	Bowl/playoffs
Edward Waters (NAIA independent) (2011–2012)
2011	Edward Waters	5–5			
2012	Edward Waters	6–6			
Edward Waters:		11–11			
Total:		11–11			
