= Michèle Bernard-Requin =

French lawyer and magistrate (1943–2019)

Vice President of the Institut national d’aide aux victimes et de médiation
- In office 1993–1997

Vice President of the Tribunal de grande instance de Paris
- In office 1999–2003

Councillor of the Court of Appeal of Paris
- In office 2003–2007

General Councillor of the Court of Appeal of Fort-de-France
- In office 2007–2009

Personal details
- Born: 7 May 1943 Vittel, France
- Died: 14 December 2019 (aged 76) 16th arrondissement of Paris, France
- Occupation: Lawyer; Magistrate

Michèle Bernard-Requin (7 May 1943 – 14 December 2019) was a French lawyer and magistrate.

== Biography ==
Bernard-Requin first worked as a lawyer at the Court of Appeal of Paris from 1966 to 1981. She then became procureur général in Rouen, then Nanterre, then Paris. She became a Councillor for the Court of Appeal of Paris in 2003, where she stayed until 2007. She also presided over Paris's Cour d'assises in 2006. She then moved to Martinique and served as General Councillor in Fort-de-France from 2007 to 2009.

Bernard-Requin died of cancer on 14 December 2019 at Sainte-Périne Hospital in Paris.

== Publications ==
- Juges accusés, levez-vous (2006)
- Chroniques de prétoire : Histoires drôles et moins drôles (2011)

== Filmography ==
- Caught in the Acts (1994)
- 10th District Court: Moments of Trials (2004)
- 9 Month Stretch (2013)

== Awards ==
- Knight of the Legion of Honour (2000)
- Officer of the Ordre national du Mérite (2005)
