= Augusta Bernard =

French fashion designer (1886–1946)

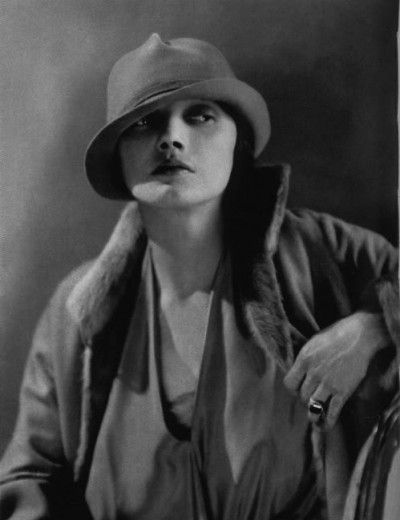
- Augusta Bernard
- Born: 1886; Provence, France
- Died: 1946 (aged 59–60)
- Occupation: fashion designer
- Known for: long neoclassical evening dresses

Augusta Bernard, also Augustabernard, (1886–1946) was a French fashion designer who gained recognition for creating long, neoclassical evening dresses during the early 1930s. She ran a salon in Rue du Faubourg Saint-Honoré, in Paris, until 1934 when she retired.

== Biography ==
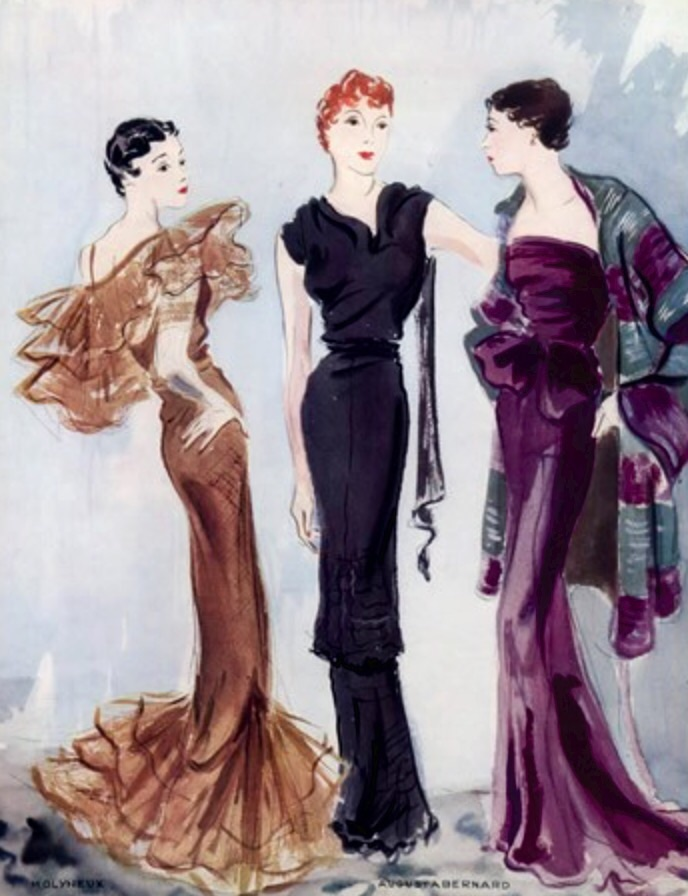
Three dresses sketched by Augusta Bernard

Born in Provence in 1886, Bernard began her career as a dress-maker by copying the designs of other couturiers. After first opening a studio in Biarritz, she moved to Paris in 1922, establishing a studio there the following year. She specialized in creating long, pale-coloured evening dresses, often cut on the bias. In order to achieve asymmetry, the simple, unadorned designs were often put together piecemeal.

Bernard became increasingly prominent over the years, especially in the 1930s after the fashionable Marquise de Paris had won the St Moritz fashion competition in the silver lamé evening gown she had designed. Her salon on the luxurious Rue du Faubourg Saint-Honoré became popular not only with French women interested in haute couture but also with Americans. In 1932, Vogue featured a photograph of one of her neoclassical evening dresses, which had been selected as the most beautiful dress of the year. One of her most prestigious dresses and one of her very last is an ivory tulle gown she created in the autumn of 1934, considered by Patricia Mears, deputy director of The Museum at FIT, to be her magnum opus.

With the onset of the Great Depression, her clients found it increasingly difficult to pay their bills. As a result, she closed her salon in 1934 and retired. She died in 1946.
