= Michel Wachenheim =

- Born: 16 January 1951 (age 75); Saint-Maur-des-Fossés, France
- Citizenship: France
- Education: Aerospace engineer
- Alma mater: École polytechnique École nationale de l'aviation civile
- Occupation: French public servant
- Known for: Ambassador

Michel Wachenheim (born 16 January 1951 at Saint-Maur-des-Fossés) is a French ambassador and permanent representative of France at the International Civil Aviation Organization (ICAO).

== Biography ==
Wachenheim graduated from École polytechnique (promotion 1972) and École nationale de l'aviation civile (promotion 1975), then begain his career in 1977 at the air traffic department. He moved to Aéroports de Paris (Paris airports) as air operations manager in 1979 and then as French airports development manager in 1983. In 1986 he was technical director of the French air transport institute before becoming economical manager for the Direction générale de l'aviation civile in 1993. In 1995, he became technical manager for the air transport Secretary of State. In July 1997, he came back to Aéroports de Paris as Adviser and then Chief of staff for the President. In July 2002 he became head of the Directorate General for Civil Aviation. He left this job in 2006 to be vice-president of Eurocontrol for one year while also becoming a member of the board of directors of Air France, Aéroports de Paris, Safran and SOGEPA.

In 2007, he became Chief of Staff the Ministry of Transport's Dominique Bussereau. On 1 September 2009, he became French ambassador and permanent representative of France at the International Civil Aviation Organization.

Michel Wachenheim is married, has three children and is Officier de la Légion d'honneur. The 2009-2010 promotion of the institut de formation universitaire et de recherche du transport aérien (research and training air transport institute) bears his name.

== Bibliography ==
- Académie nationale de l'air et de l'espace and Lucien Robineau, Les français du ciel, dictionnaire historique, Le Cherche midi, June 2005, 782 p. (ISBN 2-7491-0415-7), p. 527, Wachenheim, Michel
- Who’s Who in France, 2012, 2307 p. (ISBN 978-2-85784-052-7), notice « Wachenheim, Michel ».
