= Samuel Bernard (financier) =

French financier (1651–1739)

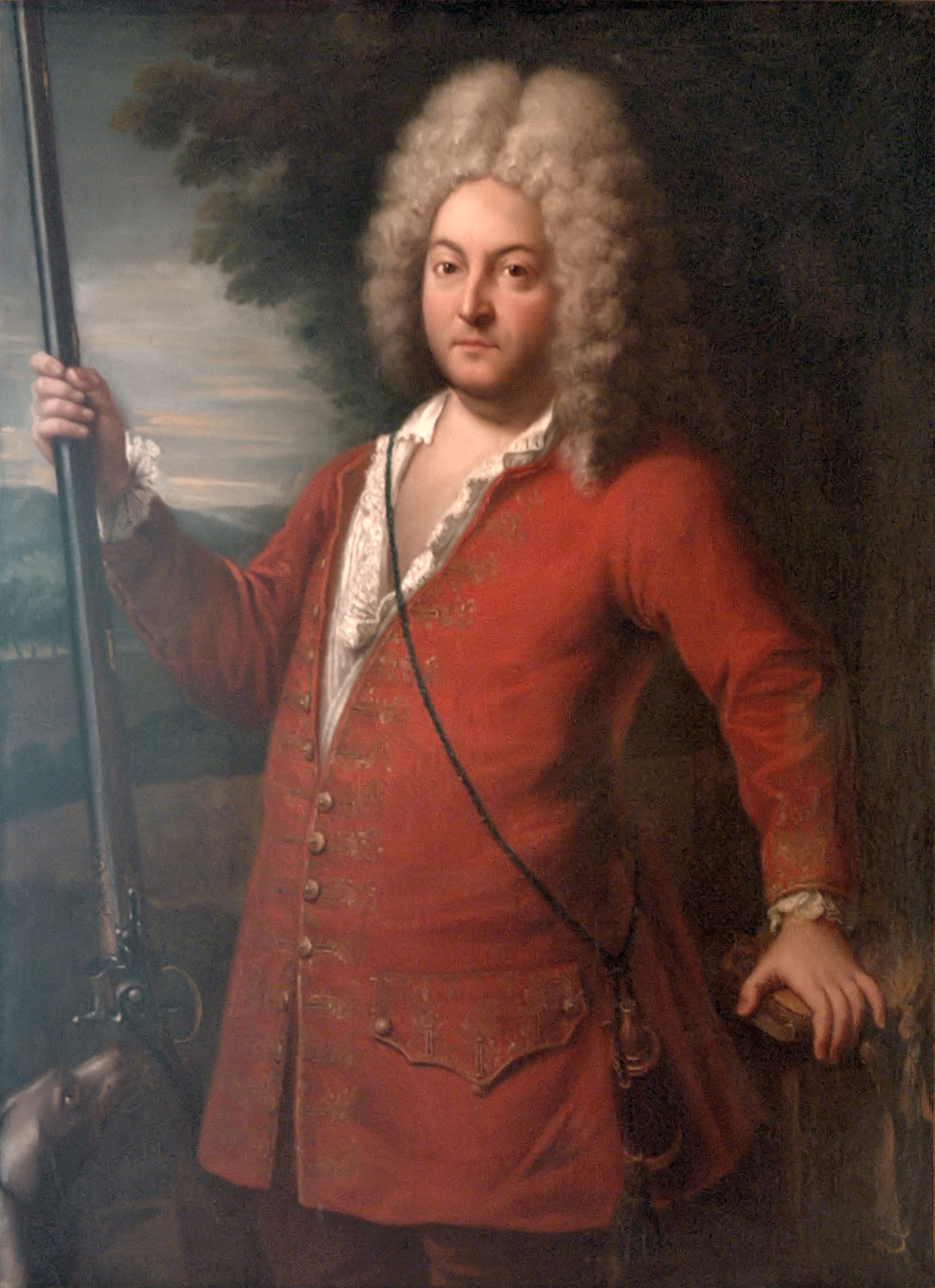
Portrait of Samuel Bernard by Nicolas Mignard. The picture hangs in the Palace of Chenonceaux in France.

Samuel Bernard (1651 in Sancerre – January 18, 1739, in Paris), Count of Coubert (1725), was a French noble and financier.

== Life ==
Of Dutch origin, Samuel Bernard was the son of the painter and engraver Samuel-Jacques Bernard (1615-1687). His family was Protestant, but his father, according to the apocryphal memoirs of the Marquise de Créquy, "had embraced the sect of Arminius [and] had been forced into exile."

Bernard started his career as a jewelry merchant but began a banking career with the support of Protestant refugees from France. Declared by Saint-Simon to be "the most famous and richest banker in Europe," he lent important funding to the Kingdom of France during the reigns of Louis XIV and Louis XV.

Louis XIV, having exhausted his finances, notably turned to Bernard in 1708 to finance the War of the Spanish Succession.

Samuel Bernard was ennobled in 1699 by Louis XIV, and created "Count of Coubert" by Louis XV in 1725. On December 29, 1719, he had effectively acquired the land of Coubert (Seine-et-Marne) with its château, which he had rebuilt from 1724 to 1727, possibly by Germain Boffrand. He also had an opulent home in Paris on place des Victoires. In 1731, he purchased the land of Glisolles in Normandie.

== Family ==
Samuel Bernard was first married to Magdelaine Clergeau, then remarried in 1720 to Miss de Saint-Chamans, sister of one of his daughters-in-law. He had several children:

- Samuel-Jacques Bernard (1686-1753), Count of Coubert (1739), who was superintendent of finance, landholding, and business for the queen (1725) (from his first marriage).
- Gabriel Bernard de Rieux (1687-1745), who married the daughter of comte de Boulainvilliers, president of the second Chamber of Inquests at the Parliament of Paris (from his first marriage).
- Vincent Bernard de la Livinière.
- Bonne Félicité Bernard (from his second marriage), who married Mathieu-François Molé, président à mortier of the Parliament of Paris.

He also had several daughters by Marie-Anne-Armande Carton, known as Manon, daughter of the actor Florent Carton Dancourt, and wife of Jean-Louis-Guillaume Fontaine (1666-1714), commissioner and controller-general of the Navy:

- Louise-Marie-Madeleine Fontaine (1706-1799), who married the fermier général Claude Dupin (a tax and customs officer), landlord of the château de Chenonceau.
- Marie-Anne-Louise Fontaine (1710-1765), who married Antoine Alexis Panneau d'Arty, a high-level tax official from 1737 to 1743.
- Françoise-Thérèse Fontaine (1712-1765), who married Mr. Vallet de La Touche.

== See also ==
- Asiento
