= Lawrence G. Bernard =

Lawrence George Bernard
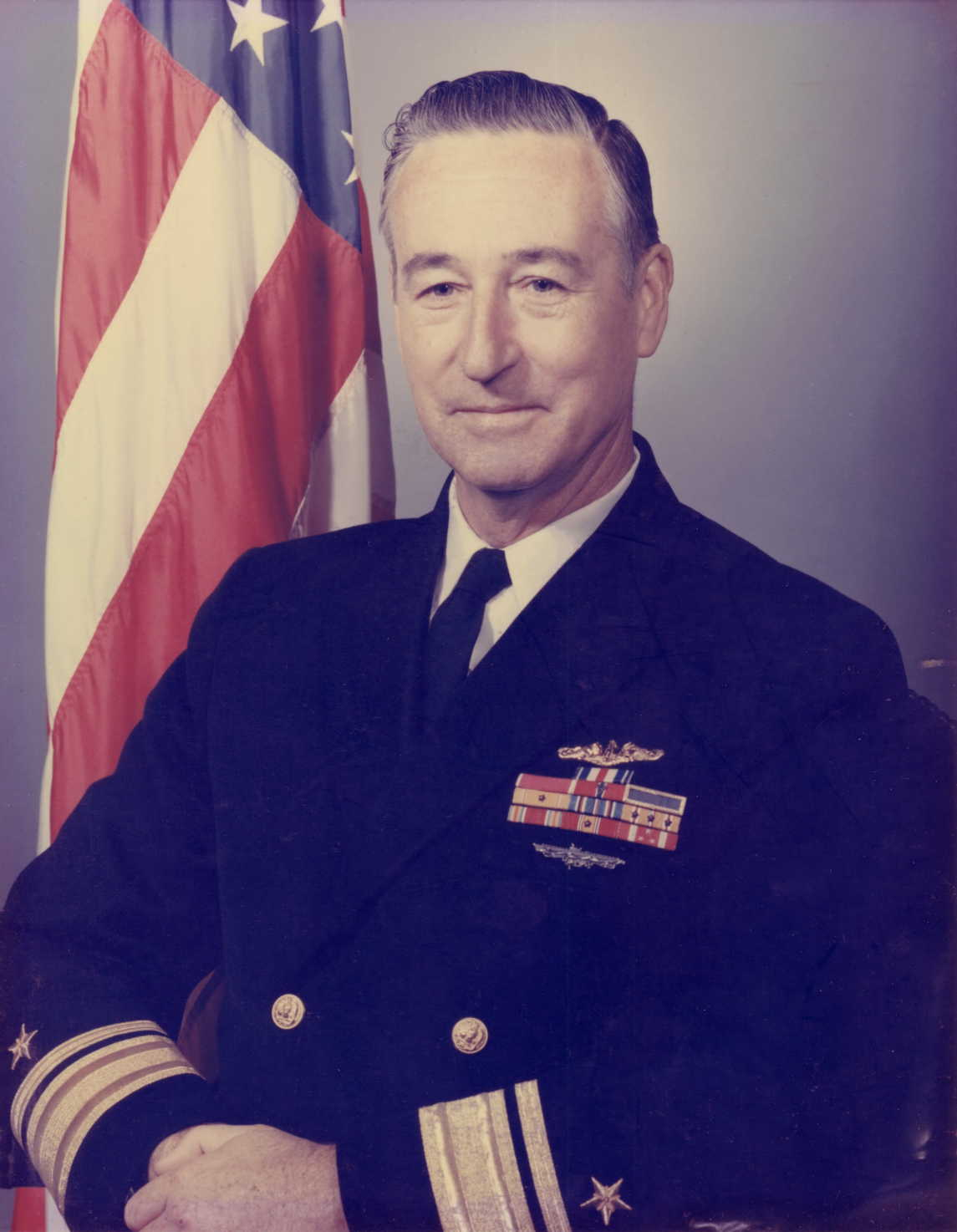
- Born: February 9, 1914; Arpan, South Dakota, U.S.
- Died: March 29, 1997 (aged 83); Santa Rosa, California, U.S.
- Burial place: Arlington National Cemetery
- Education: United States Naval Academy
- Spouse: Katherine Caroline Lenhart
- Relatives: VADM Bernard E. Manseau (Uncle)
- Military career
- Allegiance: United States of America
- Branch: United States Navy
- Service years: 1937-1971
- Rank: Rear Admiral
- Commands: USS R-2 (SS-79); USS Stickleback (SS-415); Submarine Flotilla 6 Submarine Flotilla 1 USS Howard W. Gilmore (AS-16)
- Conflicts: World War II; Korean War; Vietnam War
- Awards: Silver Star; Legion of Merit; Bronze Star

Lawrence George Bernard (February 9, 1914 – March 29, 1997), was a submarine commander during World War II who reached the rank of rear admiral in the United States Navy. Ensign Bernard graduated from the United States Naval Academy in 1937. In 1939 he was instructed in submarine warfare at New London, and in February 1940 was assigned to the USS S-39 (SS-144) as the boat's communication officer and later as the executive officer. Bernard was awarded the Silver Star and the Bronze Star Medal for his actions in these positions. In May 1944, Lieutenant Commander Bernard took command of the USS R-2 (SS-79), which was attached to the Fleet Sonar School in Key West, Florida. In July 1945 Bernard was promoted to the rank of commander and took command of the USS Stickleback (SS-415) in October of that year. Admiral Bernard took command of the search for USS Scorpion (SSN-589) on May 29, after she went missing May 22, 1968.
