= John Bernard (meteorologist) =

Dutch weather presenter (1937–2024)

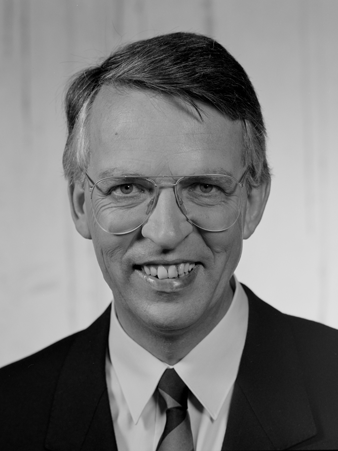
- Bernard in 2009
- Born: 6 September 1937; Rotterdam, Netherlands
- Died: November 2024 (aged 87)
- Occupations: Meteorologist, weather presenter

John Bernard (6 September 1937 – November 2024) was a Dutch meteorologist and weather presenter who was involved in meteorology for 45 years.

== Life and career ==
Bernard was a meteorological officer (forecaster) at Soesterberg Air Base from 1957 to 1962. Afterwards he worked at Zestienhoven airfield as a meteorologist, after which he was head of the department until 1973. He then started working with the Royal Netherlands Meteorological Institute in De Bilt. Later he worked as a meteorology lecturer at the Wageningen University & Research in Wageningen for six years, where he mainly taught the practical part of the study programme.

In 1984, he started working as a weather presenter with the Nederlandse Omroep Stichting (NOS) and later with RTL 4. He retired in 2002.

Bernard was an ambassador for the "Nationaal Fonds Ouderenhulp" (translated: National Fund for the Elderly). He received the MAX Award in 2007.

Bernard died mid-November 2024, at the age of 87.
