= Richard Bernard (cricketer) =

English cricketer

Personal information
- Full name: John Richard Bernard
- Born: 7 December 1938; Bristol, England
- Died: 23 February 1998 (aged 59); Bristol, England
- Batting: Right-handed
- Bowling: Right-arm medium
- Role: All-rounder

Domestic team information
- Years: Team
- 1956–1961: Gloucestershire
- 1958–1960: Cambridge University

Career statistics
Competition	FC
Matches	56
Runs scored	1891
Batting average	22.78
100s/50s	1/10
Top score	119*
Balls bowled	3269
Wickets	35
Bowling average	48.71
5 wickets in innings	0
10 wickets in match	0
Best bowling	4/44
Catches/stumpings	28/0
- Source: Cricinfo, 1 August 2013

John Richard Bernard (7 December 1938 – 23 February 1998) was an English cricketer. He played first-class cricket for Gloucestershire between 1956 and 1961 and for Cambridge University between 1958 and 1960. His final first-class match was in 1964.

A hard-hitting middle-order batsman and medium-pace bowler, Richard Bernard was a promising cricketer at Clifton College. He went up to St John's College, Cambridge, and had his longest and most successful first-class season in 1959, when he played 24 matches for Cambridge University and Gloucestershire, scoring 822 runs at an average of 22.83 and taking 25 rather expensive wickets at an average of 49.28. He made his only century that season in Cambridge's match against Free Foresters, when he went to the wicket in the first innings with the score at 142 for 6 and was 119 not out when Cambridge were all out for 316.

He worked as a family doctor in Bristol. He was the great-grandson of E. M. Grace.
