= Marie Bernard =

American doctor

Marie A. Bernard, M.D.
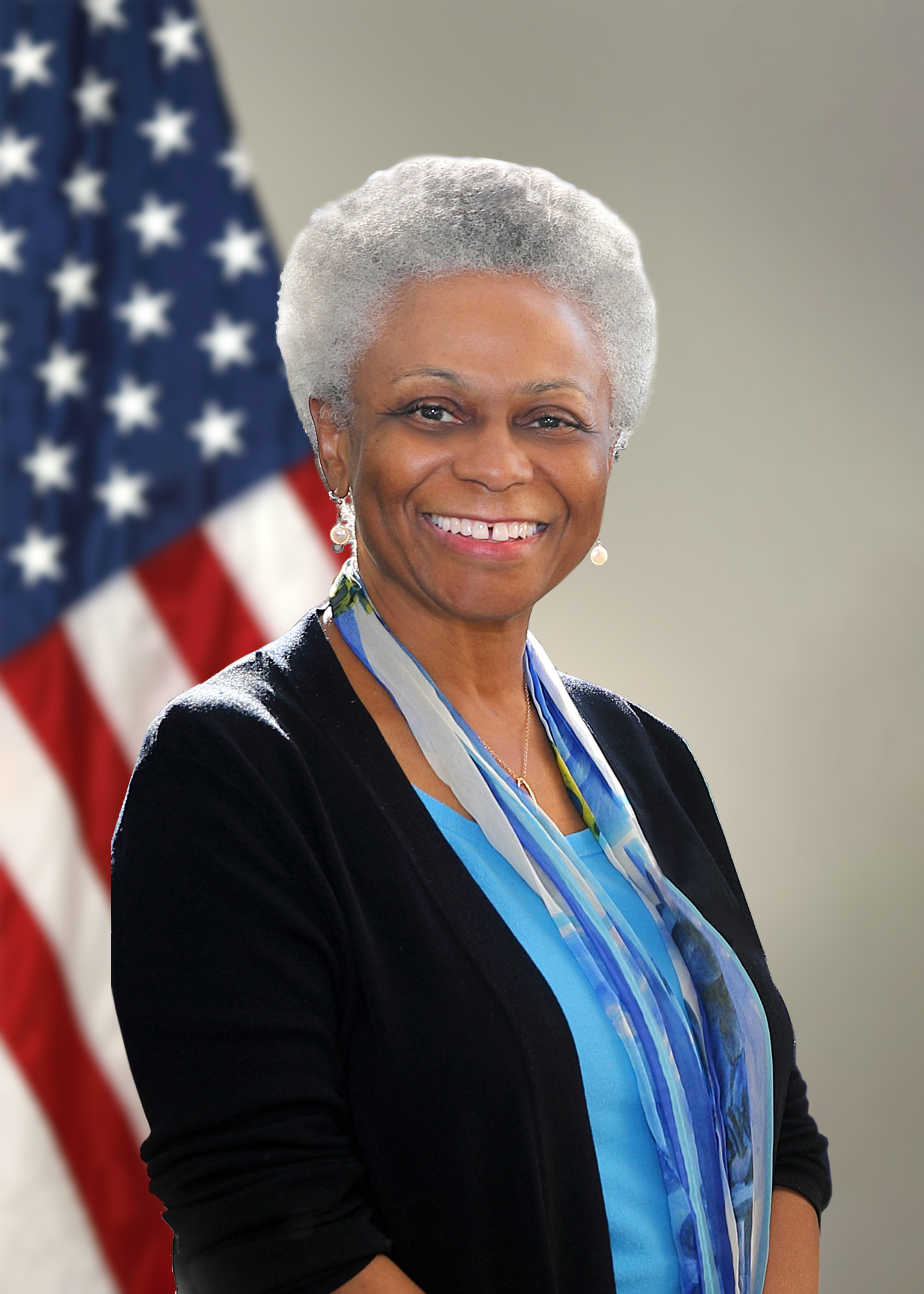
- Bernard in 2023
- Born: Marie Antonia Bernard; New York City, New York
- Education: Bryn Mawr College; University of Pennsylvania School of Medicine
- Known for: National Institutes of Health Chief Officer for Scientific Workforce Diversity; Deputy Director of National Institutes of Health's National Institute on Aging
- Scientific career
- Fields: Geriatric Medicine
- Workplaces: National Institute on Aging; National Institutes of Health; U.S. Department of Health and Human Services; University of Oklahoma College of Medicine; Oklahoma City Veterans Affairs Medical Center

Marie A. Bernard, M.D. is an American doctor. She was the Chief Officer for Scientific Workforce Diversity at the National Institutes of Health (NIH). Prior to this, she was the deputy director of the National Institute on Aging at the NIH, as well as the institutes senior geriatrician, where she oversaw approximately $3.1 billion in research focused on aging and Alzheimer's disease. Bernard served as a co-chair of the Advisory Committee to the NIH Director Working Group on Diversity, the NIH Steering Committee Working Group on DEIA, and the NIH UNITE initiative launched in 2021 to identify and address any structural racism that may exist within NIH and throughout the biomedical and behavioral workforce. She also co-led the development of the Fiscal Years 2023 – 2027 NIH-wide Strategic Plan for Diversity, Equity, Inclusion, and Accessibility (DEIA) and worked on its implementation.

She has co-chaired the Inclusion Governance Committee, which promotes inclusion in clinical research by sex/gender, race/ethnicity, and age. She also co-chaired two of the Department of Health and Human Services Healthy People 2020 objectives: 1) Older Adults, and 2) Dementias, including Alzheimer's disease. Prior to arriving at NIH in 2008, Bernard served as Donald W. Reynolds Chair in Geriatric Medicine and founding chairperson of the Donald W. Reynolds Department of Geriatric Medicine at the University of Oklahoma College of Medicine, and Associate Chief of Staff for Geriatrics and Extended Care at the Oklahoma City Veterans Affairs Medical Center.

Bernard's research interests include nutrition and function in aging populations, with particular emphasis upon ethnic minorities.

Bernard has received two national awards for her leadership in geriatric medicine: the 2014 Kent Award of the Gerontological Society of America; and the 2013 Clark Tibbits Award of Association of Gerontology in Higher Education. Dr. Bernard retired from federal service on December 31, 2024.

== Education and career ==
Bernard received her undergraduate training at Bryn Mawr College in 1972, where she graduated cum laude with Honors in Chemistry and received her M.D. degree from University of Pennsylvania School of Medicine in 1976. She trained in internal medicine at Temple University Hospital in Philadelphia, Pennsylvania, where she also served as chief resident. Following her residency, Bernard continued her career at Temple's School of Medicine, starting as an instructor in medicine, then serving as associate professor of medicine in the Division of General Internal Medicine, Director of Medical Clinics, and Assistant Dean for Admissions.

In 1990, Bernard joined the University of Oklahoma to build its geriatrics education and research programs. Until her move to the NIA, Bernard was the founding director of Oklahoma's Reynolds Department of Geriatric Medicine, the third Department of Geriatrics in the U.S. In addition to founding and directing the department, Dr. Bernard also served as Associate Chief of Staff for Geriatrics and Extended Care at the Oklahoma City Veterans Affairs Medical Center.

Bernard has received additional training through the Association of American Medical Colleges Health Services Research Institute, the Geriatric Education Center of Pennsylvania, and the Wharton School Executive Development program.

Bernard led the development of the National Institute on Aging Health Disparities Research Framework, published in 2015, which focused on assessing progress and opportunities in research on health disparities among racial and ethnic groups related to aging. On May 26, 2021, she was named Chief Officer for Scientific Workforce Diversity at the National Institutes of Health.

Bernard also chaired the woman of color committee of the NIH Working Group on Women in Biomedical Careers.

== Medical and research achievements ==
- 2023 Inductee in the Alpha Omega Alpha Honor Medical Society
- 2022 John A. Hartford Foundation Trustee award
- 2020 Barbara Payne Lectureship in Gerontology, Georgia State University
- 2014 Kent Award, Gerontological Society of America (given annually to a member of the Society "who best exemplifies the highest standards for professional leadership in gerontology")
- 2013 Clark Tibbits Award, Association of Gerontology in Higher Education (for outstanding contributions to gerontology and geriatrics education)
- 2008 50 over 50 Award, AARP, Oklahoma Chapter
- 2007 Pathmakers award, Oklahoma City/County Historical Society
- 2007-2010 Hartford Senior Leadership Scholar
