= Charles Bernard (cricketer) =

English cricketer

Personal information
- Full name: Charles Albert Bernard
- Born: 16 February 1876; Downend, Bristol, England
- Died: 26 September 1953 (aged 77); Clifton, Bristol, England
- Batting: Right-handed
- Bowling: Unknown

Domestic team information
- Years: Team
- 1896–1901: Somerset
- First-class debut: 21 May 1896 Somerset v Oxford University
- Last First-class: 26 August 1901 Somerset v Gloucestershire

Career statistics
Competition	First-class
Matches	33
Runs scored	1705
Batting average	30.44
100s/50s	2/11
Top score	122
Balls bowled	21
Wickets	0
Bowling average	–
5 wickets in innings	0
10 wickets in match	0
Best bowling	0/5
Catches/stumpings	21/–
- Source: CricketArchive, 29 December 2009

Charles Albert Bernard (1876–1953) was a first-class cricketer who made 33 appearances for Somerset between 1896 and 1901. He made his top-score of 122 in the first-innings of the 1900 County Championship match against Hampshire at the County Ground, Southampton.

Bernard first played for Somerset in a 12-a-side first-class match with Oxford University in 1896, batting in the lower order without success. He reappeared in the Somerset side in 1899 and was successful as a middle-order batsman: in his second match in the new role, he scored 79 and shared a partnership of 167 with Sammy Woods for the fifth wicket in the match against Kent.
