= Kenneth Bernard =

American author, poet, and playwright (1930–2020)

Kenneth Otis Bernard
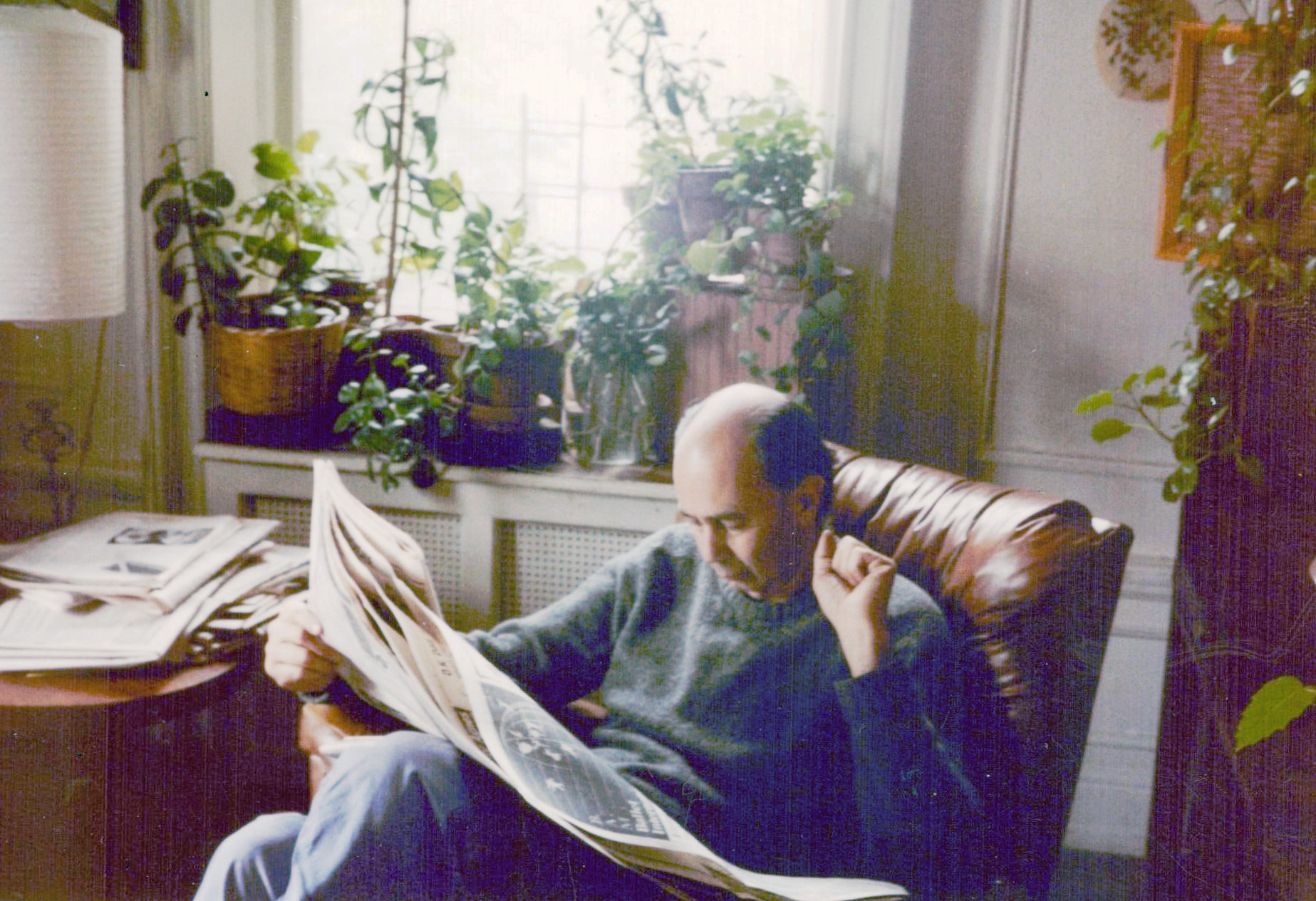
- Kenneth Bernard at home in 1981
- Born: June 7, 1930; Brooklyn
- Died: August 9, 2020 (aged 90); Manhattan
- Occupations: author, poet, and playwright

Kenneth Otis Bernard (May 7, 1930 – August 9, 2020) was an American author, poet, and playwright.

Bernard was born in Brooklyn and raised in Framingham, Massachusetts; he lived his adult life in New York City. He married Elaine Ceil Reiss in 1952 and they had three children, Lucas, Judd, and Katey.

Bernard was involved in the Off-Off-Broadway movement throughout the 1970s and into the 1980s, often working with the Playhouse of the Ridiculous at La MaMa Experimental Theatre Club in the East Village of Manhattan. The first production he contributed to was Jackie Curtis's Heaven Grand in Amber Orbit, which opened in 1969 and was first produced at La MaMa in 1970. Bernard wrote the lyrics with Curtis and Tom Murrin; the production was directed by John Vaccaro and performed by the Playhouse of the Ridiculous.

Bernard's play, Night Club, or Bubi's Hide-Away, was produced at La MaMa by the Playhouse of the Ridiculous later in 1970, and featured Ondine in the title role. Vaccaro directed a second play by Bernard in 1970, The Monkeys of the Organ Grinder, which was performed by the London-based La MaMa ensemble The Wherehouse. Vaccaro directed the Playhouse of the Ridiculous in Bernard's The Magic Show of Dr. Ma-gico in 1973, and in The Sixty Minute Queer Show in 1977, both at La MaMa.

In 1981, Vaccaro directed another production of Night Club, or Bubi's Hide-Away at La MaMa, and in 1984 directed a production of Bernard's La Fin du Cirque.

He received Guggenheim, Rockefeller, National Endowment for the Arts, National Endowment for the Humanities, New York Creative Artists Public Service, and New York Foundation for the Arts fellowships and grants.

Bernard was the author of eleven books, including the novel From The District File and Clown at Wall: A Kenneth Bernard Reader. His final book, "The Man in the Stretcher: Previously Uncollected Short Fiction," was published by Starcherone Books in 2005.

Bernard died August 9, 2020, in Manhattan.
