= Jean Bernard Sindeu =

Cameroonian politician

Jean-Bernard Sindeu is a Cameroonian politician who served in the government of Cameroon as Minister of Energy and Water Resources from 2006 to 2009. Considered a technocrat, he was appointed to that position on 22 September 2006. He was previously the First Assistant Mayor of Bana, which is located in West Province; he remains in that position as of 2007.

Sindeu was dismissed from the government on 30 June 2009.
