= Samuel-Jacques Bernard (1686–1753) =

Samuel-Jacques Bernard (19 May 1686 — 22 November 1753), comte de Coubert after the death of his father in 1739, was the son of the financier Samuel Bernard, a rich noble in France and his first wife, née (Anne)-Magdeleine Clergeau; he was superintendent of finance for Queen Maria Leszczyńska from 1725, a maître des requêtes, conseiller du roi and Grand Croix and Master of Ceremonies of the Order of Saint-Louis.

In 1715 Bernard married Elisabeth-Olive-Louise Frot[t]ier, daughter of the marquis de La Coste-Messelière.

At his father's death he inherited a fortune estimated at 33,000,000 livres. His sensational bankruptcy in 1751, which involved Voltaire in a loss of 80,000 livres representing 8,000 livres of income, did not interrupt his career as a grand seigneur, though the estate at his death remained deeply in debt. His richly furnished hôtel particulier was designed by Germain Boffrand and built in 1741-45 at 46, rue du Bac, backing onto the Paris. He filled it with works of art. For the dining-room, panelled in oak left its natural color (à la capucine), Jean-Baptiste Oudry painted in 1742 two large canvases with hunting dogs, which rank among Oudry's most splendid decorations. They now hang in the Palais Rohan in Strasbourg. The white-and-gold boiseries of the grand salon, with their overdoors of the Four Continents painted by four painters who were providing tapestry cartoons for the looms at Aubusson: Jacques Dumont le Romain, Charles-Joseph Natoire, Charles Restout and Carle Van Loo, are now installed in the Israel Museum, Jerusalem. Books and manuscripts from his extensive library, dispersed at auction in 1754 and 1756, are recognizable from the arms surrounded by the collar of the Order of Saint-Louis and the motto Bellicae vitutis praemium stamped on their rich bindings.
