= Suzanne Bernard =

French aviator (1892–1912)

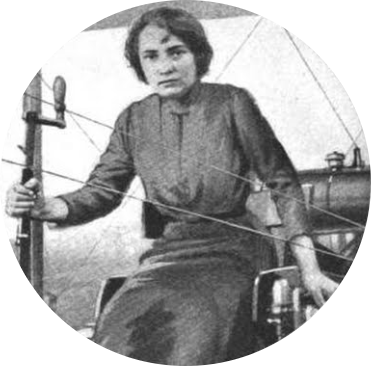
- Born: 1892; Troyes, France
- Died: 10 March 1912 (age 19); Étampes, France
- Known for: early pilot

Suzanne Bernard (1892 – 10 March 1912) was a pioneer French aviator. She was killed in a plane crash at the age of 19.

Bernard was killed at Étampes in an accident during her test for her pilot licence on 10 March 1912. The aircraft she was flying, a Caudron biplane, was caught in a wind and rolled inverted, falling to the ground. Bernard was crushed beneath it. The previous year, another French woman, Deniz Moore, aged 35, had also died while flying. The deaths caused a great deal of mourning and reflection in aviation circles, and there was criticism of parents who permitted their daughters to engage in such dangerous activity.
