= Kenneth Bernard (public health officer) =

American biodefence specialist

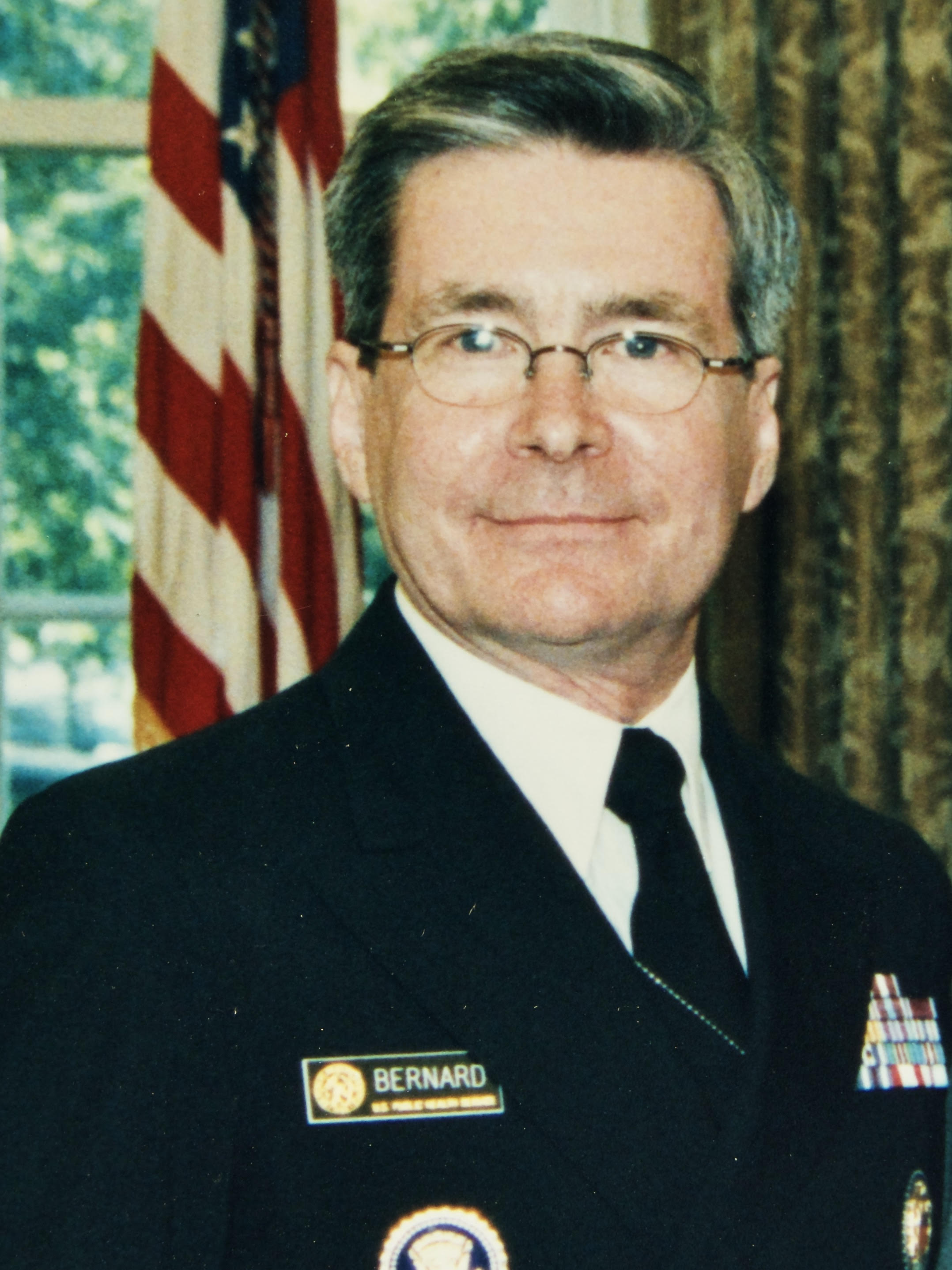
- Kenneth Bernard
- Education: University of California, Berkeley; University of California, Davis

Rear Admiral Kenneth Bernard (USPHS, Ret.) is an American public health physician and expert on biodefense and health security policy. He served at the George W. Bush White House from 2002-2005 as Special Assistant to the President for Biodefense and as Assistant Surgeon General.

During the COVID-19 outbreak, Bernard argued that it was a bipartisan, systemic failure to prioritize public health that contributed to the health crisis getting a foothold in the United States. Prior to the crisis, he was an outspoken critic of the White House's decision to eliminate the Office of Global Health Security at the National Security Council, an office that he created.

== Education ==
Bernard graduated from the University of California, Berkeley, earned an MD from the University of California, Davis, a DTM&H from the London School of Hygiene and Tropical Medicine, an Epidemic Intelligence Service (EIS) Fellowship from the Centers for Disease Control and Prevention, and is board certified in internal medicine.

== Public health career ==
Bernard began his career as an epidemiologist and disease detective at the Centers for Disease Control From 1998 to 2001, he served on President Clinton's National Security Council (NSC) staff as a Special Adviser for National Security Affairs where he opened the first ever Biodefense and Health Security Office at the White House. There he headed the smallpox policy initiative within the US and at WHO, leading to the presidential decision to retain the US smallpox research stockpile to protect Americans against the future biologic threat of smallpox.

From 2001 to 2003, he was head of the U.S. Delegation negotiating the WHO Framework Convention on Tobacco Control.

In November 2002, Dr. Bernard was appointed by President George W. Bush to be Special Assistant to the President for Biodefense on the Homeland Security Council (HSC) where he chaired the Whitehouse Biodefense Policy Coordinating committee and drafted Decision Directives for President Bush on both "Biodefense for the 21st Century" and Agricultural Bioterrorism. He also led the launch of the Project Bioshield Act, a $5.6 billion program for biological defense.

He is a senior advisor to the Defense Department, a member of the National Science Advisory Board for Biosecurity and a member of the Council on Foreign Relations.

In 2020, Bernard, along with over 130 other former Republican national security officials, signed a statement that asserted that President Trump was unfit to serve another term, and "To that end, we are firmly convinced that it is in the best interest of our nation that Vice President Joe Biden be elected as the next President of the United States, and we will vote for him."
