= Philip Bernard =

Philip Bernard (fl. 1786) was a Mi'kmaq chief in the geographical area of St. Margarets Bay, Nova Scotia.

Chief Bernard negotiated to receive legal title to a tract of land for his group in 1786. This established the principle of land grants to indigenous people and paved the way for the reserve system which was established in 1820.
