= James Bernard (engineer) =

American mechanical engineer (born 1943)

James Edward Bernard (born 1943) is an American mechanical engineer.

James Bernard was born to parents Nicholas and Gayle in 1943, and raised in Royal Oak, Michigan. Growing up near Detroit, Bernard became interested in automobiles from an early age, and successfully completed a bachelor's of science (1966), master's of science (1968), and doctorate (1971), all in engineering mechanics at the University of Michigan. Bernard remained at the University of Michigan as a researcher until he joined the Michigan State University mechanical engineering faculty in 1976. He moved to Iowa State University in 1983 and chaired ISU's mechanical engineering department until 1990. From 1999 to 2010, Bernard held an Anson Marston Distinguished Professorship of Engineering. In 2003, Bernard was elected a fellow of the American Society of Mechanical Engineers. In 2008, Bernard was named interim dean of the Iowa State University College of Engineering, and served until the appointment of Jonathan Wickert was finalized.

During his tenure at Iowa State, Bernard founded the Iowa Center for Emerging Manufacturing Technology and led its successor, the Virtual Realities Application Center, until 2003. Later, the conference room at VRAC was named for Bernard. Through his work with VRAC, Bernard served as a member of the board of directors for Engineering Animation Inc. from 1989 to 1995, and in the same positions at Mechdyne since 2003 and Demonstratives Inc. since 2008, respectively. In 2000, Bernard helped start the human-computer interaction program at Iowa State. He retired in 2011, and was granted emeritus status.

Bernard and his wife married in 1966 and raised four children. After he retired, the couple moved to Colorado.
