= Arthur Bernard (footballer) =

Luxembourgish footballer

Personal information
- Date of birth: 10 October 1915
- Date of death: 5 March 1984 (aged 68)
- Position: Midfielder

International career
| Years | Team | Apps | (Gls) |
| 1937–1939 | Luxembourg | 2 | (0) |

Arthur Bernard (10 October 1915 – 5 March 1984) was a Luxembourgish footballer. He played in two matches for the Luxembourg national football team from 1937 to 1939. He was also part of Luxembourg's squad for the football tournament at the 1936 Summer Olympics, but he did not play in any matches.
