= Henry Meyners Bernard =

British biologist, mathematician and cleric

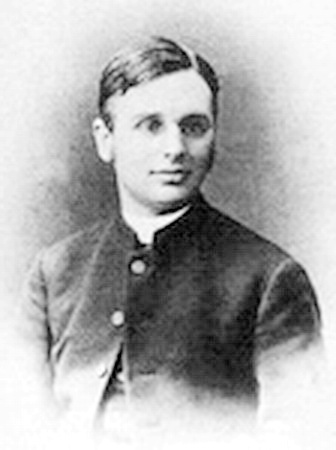

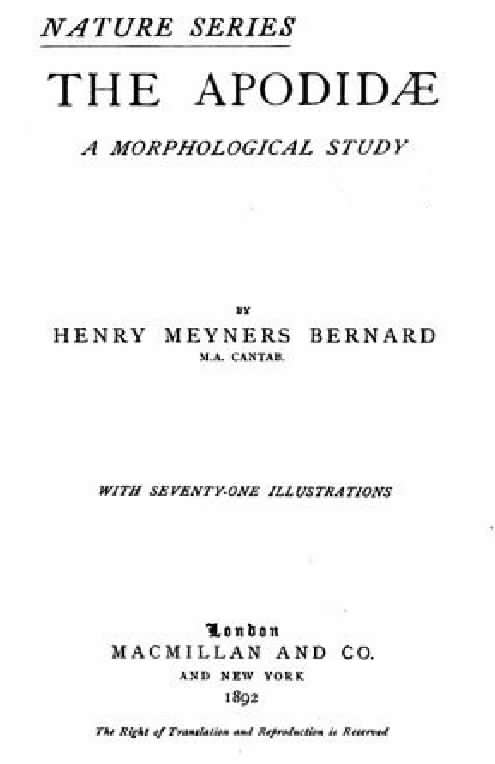
Apodidae later renamed Triopsidae

Henry Meyners Bernard (29 November 1853 in Singapore – 4 January 1909 in London) was a British biologist, carcinologist, palaeontologist, mathematician and cleric, and an authority on solifuges, corals and trilobites. He was the third of six children born to Alfred George Farquhar Bernard and Elizabeth Antoinette Moor.

The death of Henry M. Bernard removes from our midst a friend and fellow-worker who will be greatly missed by a large circle of men of science. Mr. Bernard took mathematical honours at Cambridge as B.A. in 1876, and entered the Church, his last charge being a Chaplaincy at Moscow, which he left in 1888 in order to study Biology under Haeckel at Jena. In 1892 Mr. Bernard published an important monograph on "The Apodidae", his study of these forms leading to papers in the GEOLOGICAL MAGAZINE in 1894 and 1895 on the systematic position of the Trilobites, and on the 'Sandblast' as a method of developing these organisms from the rocks in which they are embedded. In 1894 he began the study of the recent and fossil corals at the British Museum (Natural History), continuing the quarto 'Illustrated Catalogue of the Madreporaria' (published by order of the Trustees) originally commenced by the late Mr. George Brook. In this work Mr. Bernard paid much attention to the fossil forms. He continued to work at the corals in the British Museum until 1907. During these thirteen years he prepared five volumes, namely :— Vol. II of the Catalogue (begun by Mr. Brook) on the Turbinaria and Astraeopora. III, on the Montiporina;. IV, Goniopora. V, Porites (Indo-Pacific). VI, Porites (West Indies) and Goniopora.

— Cambridge University Press (1909)

After graduating from Corpus Christi College, Cambridge, Bernard served curacies in Wells and Herefordshire before six years as chaplain of the English Church in Moscow, which he left to study biology and zoology under Professor Ernst Haeckel at Jena (promoter of Darwin's work and proponent of the 'recapitulation theory'). Bernard then catalogued corals and fossils at the British Museum, publishing numerous papers and monographs. In addition he wrote 'The Sense of Sight: Sketch of a New Theory' (1896), 'A Suggested Origin of the Segmented Worms', and 'The Problem of Metamerism' (1900), 'Studies in the Retina' (1906) and co-authored a 'Textbook of Comparative Anatomy' (1896). He became a Fellow of the Linnean and Zoological Societies. He was a socialist, and wrote The Scientific Basis of Socialism: Two Essays in Evolution (New Age Press 1908). He died at 109, West End Lane, London, N.W.

The crustacean family Apodidae was later renamed Triopsidae as it duplicated the family name used for swifts.

== Personal life ==
He married on 19 November 1883 in Vienna, Austria to Maida Mirrielees, Russian-born daughter of Archibald Mirrielees, founder of Muir & Mirrielees Co. (later renamed TsUM), a high end department store in Moscow. They had three children

- Una Mirrilees Bernard b. 11 April 1886
- Ida Bernard b. 11 July 1888
- Maude Bernard b. 26 March 1890, d. 1945

His youngest brother Charles Grant Bugden Bernard was the great-great grandfather of Justin Trudeau, 23rd Prime Minister of Canada.

== Close friends ==
- Rudyard Kipling

== Works ==
- 1893 Trilobites with Antennae. (Nature.)
- 1894 Systematic Position of the Trilobites. (GEOL. MAG., 1894, p. 230- 1895 p. 280.)
- 1894 Systematic Position of the Trilobites. (Quart. Journ. Geol. Soc, vol. 1, p. 411.)
- 1894 Trilobites developed by the Sandblast. (GEOL. MAR. 1894, p. 553.)
- 1895 The Zoological Position of the Trilobites. (Science Progress.)
- 1896 The comparative morphology of the Galeodidae - Transactions of the Linnean Society of London
- 1897 Fossil Apodidae. (Natural Science.)
- 1897 Natural history - R. Lydekker, W. F. Kirby, B. B. Woodward, R. Kirpatrick, R. I. Pocock, R. Bowdler Sharpe, W. Garstang, F. A. Bather, H. M. Bernard
- On the Affinities of the Madreporarian genus Alveopora with the Palaeozoic Favositidae. (Journ. Linnean Soc, Zool.)
