= Michel Bernard (administrator) =

French government official

- Born: 1 March 1943 (age 83); Bourges
- Education: École polytechnique École nationale de l'aviation civile
- Occupation: Former head of Agence nationale pour l'emploi
- Predecessor: Michel Bon
- Successor: Christian Charpy

Michel Bernard, born the 1st of March 1943 at Bourges, graduate of École Polytechnique (promotion 1964) and École nationale de l'aviation civile (promotion 1967), was the head of the Agence nationale pour l'emploi from 1995 to 2005.

== Biography ==
Michel Bernard has performed a career in French administration and national companies.

He starts his career in 1969 at the service technique de la navigation aérienne (air navigation technical department) then becomes head of the centre en route de la navigation aérienne Nord (North en route air navigation center) in 1978.

He is promoted Directeur général de l'aviation civile in 1993.

During this period, he was director of human resources at Snecma, Air France director and Air Inter President from November 1993 until March 1995, when he resigned, denouncing the "backward-looking categorical protection" which are attached the unions.

He is head of the ANPE from 1995 till 2005 (his predecessor was Michel Bon and his successor Christian Charpy).

Since October 1995, Michel Bernard is head of the board of directors of the Fonds d'aide et de soutien pour l'intégration et la lutte contre les discriminations (Aid funds and support for integration and the fight against discrimination).

Michel Bernard is the current President of the "cultures du coeur" ("hearth culture") association which works to fight against social exclusion by promoting access to cultural and sporting events.

== Bibliography ==
- Académie nationale de l'air et de l'espace and Lucien Robineau, Les français du ciel, dictionnaire historique, Le Cherche midi, Juin 2005, 782 p. (ISBN 2-7491-0415-7), p. 61, Bernard, Michel
