= Michel Bernard (politician) =

French politician (1932–2021)

Deputy for Haute-Vienne
- In office 16 March 1986 – 14 May 1988

General Councillor of the Canton of Limoges-Centre
- In office 1981–1994

Personal details
- Born: 3 November 1932 La Villedieu, France
- Died: 19 February 2021 (aged 88)
- Party: RPR

Michel Bernard (3 November 1932 – 19 February 2021) was a French politician.

== Biography ==
Prior to his political career, Bernard was a member of the Conseil économique et social du Limousin. He ran for and won a seat in the French National Assembly in 1986, representing the department of Haute-Vienne. At the same time, he was also the General Councillor of the Canton of Limoges-Centre. In the 1989 French municipal elections, he ran for Mayor of Limoges, but was defeated by Socialist incumbent Louis Longequeue by 669 votes.

Michel Bernard died on 19 February 2021 at the age of 88.
