= James Bernard (elocutionist) =

British elocutionist

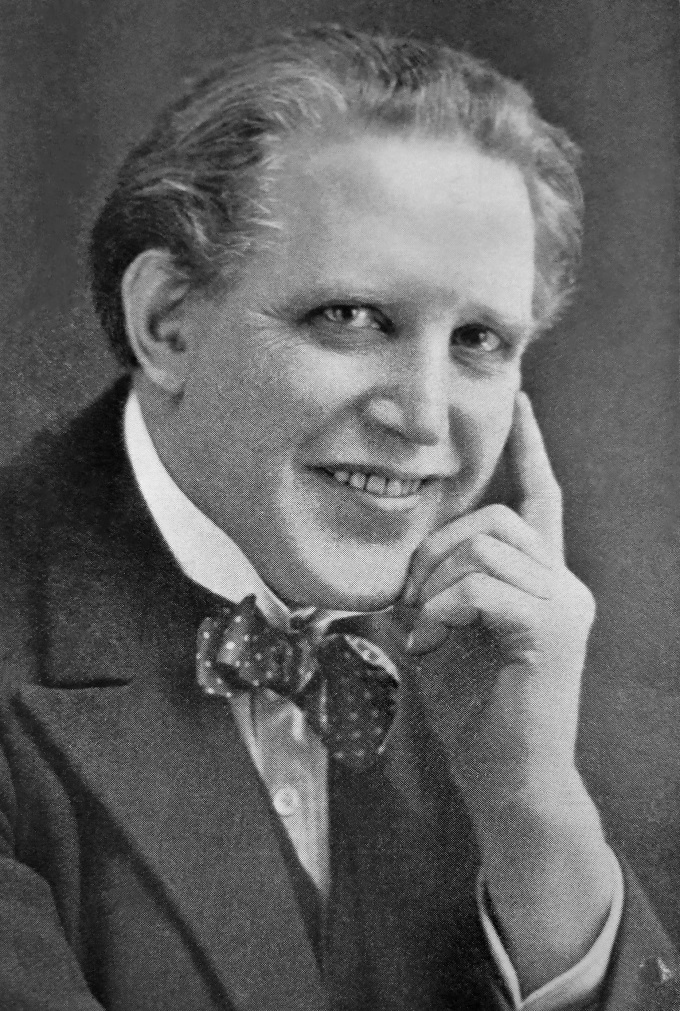
- Born: James Rudolph Bernhard von Schmoocke; 11 April 1874; Chorlton upon Medlock, Manchester
- Died: 5 March 1946 (aged 71); Withington, Manchester
- Occupations: Reciter, elocutionist, author
- Spouse: Alexandra Oxley

James Bernard (11 April 1874 – 5 March 1946) was an English reciter, elocutionist, author, Primitive Methodist and Unitarian lay preacher. Bernard was well known for his frequent radio broadcasts of 'character sketches' in the 1920s and early '30s (from early BBC studios; Manchester 2ZY and Savoy Hill in London) and as a foremost teacher of 'dramatic interpretation' in the North West of England. He performed works by Shakespeare and Dickens and popular authors of the day. On radio, he was remembered for his rendition of excerpts from Hardy's epic-drama of the war with Napoleon, The Dynasts (1924, 1926, 1930). He was Professor of Elocution at the Leeds College of Music from about 1911 to 1929 and, most influentially, at the Royal Manchester College of Music (RMCM) from 1929. From here and his studio in Lord Street (renamed White Oak Road), Fallowfield he taught a generation of northern actors. Following his death, he was succeeded at the RMCM (subsequently, the Royal Northern College of Music) by his student Sheila Barlow, MBE who through many successful years of collaboration with the Principal, Frederick Cox, developed the reputation of its Opera Department. For many years (1920 or earlier to about 1935), he also taught elocution at Hartley College, Manchester a major institution for training men for the Methodist ministry.

Bernard is best remembered as tutor and mentor to stage and screen actor, Robert Donat. Donat began taking elocution lessons in 1918 (aged 12 years) after being enthralled by a recital performance of Dickens’ ‘A Christmas Carol’ given by Bernard in Rusholme, a suburb of south Manchester. Interviewed in 1934, Donat said modestly: ‘Whatever success I may have gained has been entirely due to James Bernard, my elocution teacher in Manchester, who taught me all I know. He pushed me into my first stage job, and has always given me every possible help a man could give.’

== Early life ==
James Bernard - full name, James Rudolph Bernhard von Schmoocke - was born in Chorlton upon Medlock, Manchester and died at his home in Withington (South Manchester). Little is known of his pre-recital years. As a young boy, he spent time with his uncle, James Lowe, in London and he worked for the Stockport Express in his youth. Bernard married Alexandra Oxley (1872–1944), the daughter of a local 'smallware manufacturer', 27 April 1915 at the Platt Unitarian Chapel, Fallowfield.

== Career ==
Bernard had early ambitions for the stage. Interviewed in 1936, he said: 'It has been my fate, to be always associated with the stage but not on it. I have never fulfilled my early ambition, but I have taught many other people who have been successful.’ His role was to teach others and to fashion their early careers through his many friends and contacts in the theatre world. Those of his students who achieved success on the London stage included Reginald Tate (Prof. Bernard Quatermass in the BBC’s 1953 'The Quatermass Experiment'), David Olive, Veronica Turleigh, Emrys Jones, and Robert Donat.

Bernard was a late example of a class of professional platform reciters and elocutionists who were in vogue throughout the English-speaking world during the nineteenth and early twentieth centuries. Other notable examples of reciters are F. Matthias Alexander, originator of the Alexander Technique and Lionel Logue of The King's Speech - voice coach to King George VI. Bernard, fiercely resisted any suggestion that he was a voice therapist and, as society and fashions changed, his melodramatic acting style was seen as increasingly old-fashioned and unsuitable for the new media of sound and film. Bernard's art was a victim of a changing world and, in particular, the decline in demand for his services during the Second World War years. Michael Kennedy described him as an 'old-world figure' who harked back to the glory days of late Victorian and Edwardian actor-managers and, most of all, the supreme artistry of Sir Henry Irving 'for whom God is to be thanked for a divine gift,' Bernard wrote to Donat, 12 November 1942.

Bernard's teaching motto was 'Divide and master'. His methods were rigorous and practical: 'Efforts to train for public speaking, or indeed even for good private speaking, are largely wasted,' he wrote, 'unless the indivisible sounds are mastered one by one. Again, “Divide et Impera”'. Each consonant and vowel was to be practised in isolation forming the mouth into the correct shape, guided by careful listening and according to the Resonator Scale of whispered tones developed by William A. Aikin. Vocal training should be complemented by general fitness (Bernard recommended Lieutenant Muller's 'System'), and study of the Delsarte System of Dramatic Expression. Bernard, himself, studied for many years with the actress and author, Rose Meller O’Neill. O'Neill wrote a book on the Delsarte System, Science & Art of Speech & Gesture (London: C. W. Daniel company 1927) that Bernard highly recommended - 'Buy, borrow, beg, or sell your bed to get a copy', Bernard wrote. Donat remembered Bernard's insistence on clear enunciation and a resonant voice: “My elocution teacher in Manchester was always reminding me to 'remember the bloke at the back who had paid his tanner,' and I have never forgotten it.”

He maintained his relationship with Robert Donat chiefly by letter throughout his life. The relationship was somewhat turbulent reaching a low point of 'estrangement' in May 1940, mainly due to Bernard's harking back to the past and his reluctance or inability to move on and accept Donat's artistic (and financial) success as a film star. But there was a reconciliation and they corresponded until a few weeks before Bernard's death.

Bernard's latter years were dogged by pain and immobility (arthritis in both legs) but his reputation as a teacher was undiminished and his energy and perseverance for forging the best start for his talented pupils (he called them his ‘pups') remained unabated to the very end. He is buried (unrecorded on headstone) in Philips Park Cemetery, Manchester with his wife.

Bernard wrote two books, Twenty-Four Lessons in Elocution (1933), the second edition (1933, 1946) with a Foreword by Robert Donat and a companion volume, Dramatic Recitations and How to Deliver Them (1934) – a dramatic ‘reader’ containing two 'original studies of character' by Bernard: ‘He Wanted to be an Actor’ (A Tragi-Comedy of Youth) and ‘The Quack’ (A Dramatic Episode).

== Bibliography ==
- Bernard, James (1933). Twenty-Four Lessons in Elocution (1936, 1946 ed.). Sir Isaac Pitman & Sons, Ltd.
- Bernard, James (1934). Dramatic Recitals and How to Deliver Them. Sir Isaac Pitman & Sons, Ltd.
