= Marc Jean-Bernard =

French philosopher

- Born: Marc Passerieu dit Jean-Bernard; May 14, 1952 (age 74); Paris, France
- Other name: Marc Jean-Bernard
- Occupation: Full Professor
- Years active: 1997-2023
- Website: mjeanbernard.weebly.com

Marc Jean-Bernard (born 14 May 1952) is a French philosopher, academic, writer, classical guitarist and musicologist. Among the main academic interests reflected in his research and publications are Philosophy, Aesthetics, Musicology, Cultural Diplomacy, Austrian culture, Latin American culture, Italian culture, Diplomacy, and generally the hermeneutics of culture. He is currently based at the University of Puerto Rico in San Juan.

== Early life and education ==
Jean-Bernard was born in Paris into a family of intellectuals and lawyers and began studying very early classical music (piano and classical guitar). He completed philosophy Bachelor's and Master's degrees at Paris 1 Panthéon-Sorbonne University, where he was formed by philosophers such as Jacques Bouveresse, his professor of Logic and then his Director of Doctoral Thesis on Wittgenstein; and for the Philosophy of Music Vladimir Jankélévitch, his professor of Moral and Political Philosophy. In doctoral school at Paris I, he studied specifically Georg Wilhelm Friedrich Hegel's Aesthetics, Wittgenstein theory of Representation (Abbildung) in the Tractatus logico-philosophicus for his DEA, and then wrote his doctoral thesis on Wittgenstein and the Idea of Culture, exposing the aesthetic and cultural resonance of Ludwig Wittgenstein's philosophical corpus in relation to Austrian/German culture and music.

== Career ==
In 1978, while working on his doctorate at the Sorbonne, Jean-Bernard started a career as a classical guitarist, conductor, and musicologist. He performed extensively as a soloist and conductor until 2000. An important experience as an intellectual and musician has been his radio contribution to Radio France (RFI, 1988-1993, producing cultural radio broadcasting, specially on classical music. Marc Jean-Bernard is still performing as a soloist in summer, giving specially Concert Lectures regularly in England (2015-2021). Even performing European repertoire, he has always been strongly interested in Latin American music, literature, and Latin American culture, and has examined Latin American music's narrative and mythical dimensions from a philosophical standpoint. Furthermore, he moved to Colombia and began teaching philosophy of language at the state University of Valle in Cali; he also joined the Conservatory Antonio María Valencia as the dean of music faculty. See the article published in the diary in Cali: Marc Jean-Bernard, músico y filósofo - Un guitarrista de talla munidal: Marc Jean-Bernard, Decano de música en el conservatorio Antonio María Valencia, un importante artista radicado en Cali, with photo, JPEG. In 2004, he was nominated as a consul of France in Puerto Rico and left Colombia to become a Dean of Music Faculty at the Puerto Rico Conservatory of Music and then professor of Humanities at the University of Puerto Rico (UPR) in San Juan. He is currently Catedréatico and Senator for his Faculty As consul, he has been involved in the development of French culture and European studies in Puerto Rico, in conjugation with European universities. He became the director of the International Studies program at UPR (General Studies) in 2009. At the UPR, Dr. Marc Passerieu dit Jean-Bernard taught Humanities, Aesthetics of Architecture (Master's degree), Theory and Practice of International Diplomacy. More philosophical interests include the cultural dialogue between Europe and the United States, with a topical emphasis on Latin America and Italy from the diplomatic relations and cultural perspectives. In 2010, he became the dean of Puerto Rico's consular corps, founded in 2014 the first Institute of International Relations of Puerto Rico, a nonprofit think tank.He is currently Consul Emeritus at the Consular Corps.

In 2004, he was elected a member of the Academy of the Arts and Sciences of Puerto Rico and, in 2005, was made a commander of the Order of the Baron of Humbolt. In this category of awards and decorations, he was Elected Knight of Merit of the Order: "Sacred and Military Constantine Order of Saint George" (St. Patrick's Cathedral, New York 04/03/2019). As a musician, he has collaborated and played guitar on a number of albums, including Joaquín Rodrigo's L’Oeuvre pour Guitare and Fantasia para un Gentilhombre, Leo Brouwer's Works for Solo Guitar, Mario Castelnuovo-Tedesco's Complete Works for Solo Guitar, Vol. 1 and Heitor Villa-Lobos' Mélodies pour soprano et Guitare and Bachianas Brasileiras (5th edition). Completing the series of Works for solo guitar already published is currently part of his commitments and projects.

== Philosophical work ==
Jean-Bernard's philosophical studies at the University of Paris I. Sorbonne and further writings were centered on continental History of Philosophy, Philosophy of Language (Doctoral school) and aesthetics of music, revealing an early double comparative interest for Husserlian Phenomenology and Ludwig Wittgenstein entire philosophical work. This open view of phenomenology and cultural hermeneutics, revealed by his conferences and his Tractatus musico-philosophicus (Vol. I. Filosofía y estética musical,2012), implied the commentary of thinkers as Wittgenstein, Merleau-Ponty, Schopenhauer, Nietzsche, Adorno, Vladimir Jankélévitch, Gabriel Marcel and Roger Scruton.

Jean-Bernard stressed the original unity between philosophy, theology and music -which is rooted in western culture since the ancient Greek Theory of Music, the Medieval ontology of Music and the Renaissance philosophy of music-, has to be rethought and overcome with the acknowledgement of the internal relation between Mousiké, lógos and αρμονια. This perspective stresses cultural hermeneutics, Aesthetics, and musicology for the problem of universal unity and diversity in cultures. This open and comparative hermeneutics is focused on both practical and theoretical dimensions.

The original horizon of his philosophical thinking and practice synthesizes an organic set of axiological investigations, corresponding to a unified epistemic methodology that embraces cultural hermeneutics, aesthetics, ethics and cultural diplomacy. His construction of ethical and esthetical responsibility stands as a philosophical cantus firmusfor the understanding of cultural polyphony. Jean-Bernard seeks to provide a philosophical account of cognitive sciences in the field of philosophy of consciousness and culture. The extension of research in philosophy of mind and continental philosophy assigns a theoretical imperative to ethical and cultural investigations. His research on intentionality and subjectivity induces a deep revision of the dichotomy between the transcendental and analytical accounts of phenomenology. In his writings and conferences, he develops methodologically the clear conceptual grammar of the term intentionality, unifying rigorously its phenomenological and cognitive meaning. Then, a non-reductive perspective on mind and psychism examines cognitive intentionality (representational consciousness of cognition) and affective intentionality (non-representational consciousness, following both the phenomenological description of consciousness and the legacy of Wittgenstein’s investigations on perception, knowledge, and psychology.

In his musical or philosophical essays and papers, Jean-Bernard stressed the relevance of values in the aesthetic experience considered as a counterpoint of hermeneutic gestures. This insight on symbolic consciousness and truth-content of art is exemplified throughout two ontological interconnected fields: music and architecture. Considering the non-representational and representational semantics of these fields, the temporization and spatialization gestures implied in design and composition embrace the entire sphere of dwelling in a given world, what we call an esthetical oikonomia. This connection between temporality and spatiality is exposed through recent examples, where axiological and "immunological" claims of a harmonic world are creatively expressed. These paradigmatic topics, focused on architectural design and musical compositions, are chosen between contemporary works from European, Japanese, North, and South American cultures. The first two volumes of his Phénoménologie du Dialogue, a trilogy written in French (Paris, 2019, 2021) crystallized the claim for dialogue between cognitive and hermeneutics approaches in aesthetics, ethics, and comparative theory of civilization. His dialogical perspective entails new methodological demands applied to cultural diversity. Phenomenological, grammatical, and cognitive approaches of today’s aesthetic endeavor induce a corresponding insight into the role of effective intentionality in ethics. He assumes that we are led to a synoptic view of responsibility, within a non-reductive frame. Responsibility, linking Wittgenstein to Emmanuel Levinas, Jacques Maritain and Jankélévitch emphasizes his own exigent core of an infinite philosophical télos and ethical duty.

== Selected works ==
Jean-Bernard has published in French, Spanish, English and Italian(2023).

- 2008 Paroles et musique dans le monde hispanique. Éditions Indigo & Côté Femmes, Paris. ISBN 2-35260-001-4
- 2009: "Estéticas de Pau Casals: el arco entre música y ética" in El Arco prodigioso: Perspectivas de Pablo Casals y su legado en Puerto Rico, ed. Pedro Reina, pp. 71–94. EMS Editores, San Juan. ISBN 978-0-9817992-7-8
- 2012: Tractatus musico-philosophicus, I.: Filosofía y estética musical. Editorial Postdata, San Juan. ISBN 9781480191884
- 2014: "Une triple articulation philosophique, culturelle et politique." Reveue de la Fondation Charles de Gaulle, (177).
- 2014: "La aporía del nomos jurídico." Revista del Colegio de Abogados y Abogadas de Puerto Rico, 75(1-2): 291-331.
- 2017: "André Malraux, Europa y los destinos de la cultura mundial." Revista Umbral, (2): 81-108.
- 2018: Phénoménoologie du dialogue, I: Charles de Gaulle, une pensée diplomatique en acte - France-Amérique Latine. Éditions Édilivre, Paris. ISBN 9782414243235
- 2018: "The Grammars of Mystical Experience in Christian Theological Dialogue." Philosophy Study, 8(4). ISSN 2159-5321
- 2020: Phénoménoologie du dialogue, II: L'expérience mystique et le commandement du dialogue spirituel. Éditions Édilivre, Paris. ISBN 9782414505982
- Review of the philosophical paper: The Phenomenological Normativity of “The Self-in-Migration” https://www.academia.edu/33350403/
- Ontologie de la Participation in musicis - Participation et présence musicale depuis Gabriel Marcel et Vladimir Jankélévitch. Congrès de la Société Française de Philosophie, Paris, may, 2021.To be published by Vrin, 2023.
- La risonanza poetica, musicale ed estética del Risorgimento per l' Unità italiana nel tempo di Vittore Emanuella II.

Conferenza on line, Istituto Nazionale per la Guardia d'Onore alle Reali Tombe del Pantheon. Zoom, March 4, 2023, 1:00 PM. Rewiewd in: Review of the Istituto Nazionale per la Guardia d'Onore alle Reali Tombe del Pantheon. https://www.guardiadonorealpantheon.it/
