= Arthur Bernard (author) =

French author and historian (1940–2022)

- Born: Jean-Pierre Arthur Bernard; 11 June 1940; Valence, France
- Died: 26 October 2022 (aged 82); Grenoble, France
- Education: Grenoble Institute of Political Studies; Sciences Po; Paris-Sorbonne University
- Occupations: Author; Historian

Jean-Pierre Arthur Bernard (11 June 1940 – 26 October 2022) was a French author, historian, and essayist.

== Biography ==
Bernard was born in Valence at the start of World War II to a middle-class family. He studied at the Grenoble Institute of Political Studies (IEP Grenoble) and the Sciences Po before continuing with literature at Paris-Sorbonne University.

From 1968 to 2008, Bernard taught history of political ideas at IEP Grenoble. In 1995, he was a visiting professor in the French and Italian departments at the University of California, Santa Barbara. In addition to his teaching career, he wrote novels and essays under various pseudonyms.

Arthur Bernard died in Grenoble on 26 October 2022 at the age of 82.

== Publications ==
- Les Parapets de l'Europe (1988)
- Bouquet d'injures et d'horions (1990)
- La Chute des graves (1991)
- La Petite Vitesse (1993)
- Le neuf peut attendre (1995)
- L'Ami de Beaumont (1998)
- On n'est pas d'ici (2000)
- Lettres d'amour (2001)
- C'était pire avant (2002)
- L'Oubli de la natation (2004)
- La Guerre avec ma mère (2006)
- Le Désespoir du peintre (2009)
- Gaby grandit (2011)
- Paris en 2040 (2012)
- Gaby et son maître (2013)
- Ernest Ernest (2013)
- Tout est à moi, dit la poussière (2016)

=== Under the pseudonym Jean-Pierre A. Bernard ===
- Le Parti communiste français et la question littéraire (1921-1939) (1972)
- Paris-Rouge, 1944-1964. Les communistes français dans la capitale (1991)
- Les Deux Paris. Les représentations de Paris dans la seconde moitié du xixe siècle (2001)

=== Under the pseudonym Jean-Pierre Arthur Bernard ===
- Le Goût de Paris (2004)

=== Essays ===
- Rencontre avec Arthur Bernard (2007)
- Le désespoir du peintre (2009)
- Le Paris de Tardi : un xixe siècle éternel ? (2010)
- L'ombre de Beckett (2013)
- Piéton de Paris et fervent admirateur de Beckett... (2014)
- Écrire Paris (2015)
- Vertu de la poussière (2016)
- Je m'appelle Ferdinand, et autres propos par Les Doigts dans la Prose (2016)
- L'art roman d'Arthur Bernard (2017)
