= David Bernard (meteorologist) =

American television meteorologist

- Born: 1969 (age 56–57); Houston, Texas
- Education: University of Texas; Mississippi State University
- Occupation: Former Chief Meteorologist
- Employer: WVUE-TV

David Bernard (born 1969) is a former American television meteorologist who worked for WVUE-TV in New Orleans, Louisiana. He previously worked for CBS News and television stations in Miami, Florida, and Tulsa, Oklahoma.

== Early life and career ==
Bernard is a native of Houston, Texas. He graduated from the University of Texas at Austin and attended Mississippi State University.

In 1993, he began his career in television meteorology forecasting in the Tornado Alley region of the Texas Panhandle and Oklahoma. Bernard first worked at television stations KZTV in Corpus Christi, Texas and KVII in Amarillo, Texas.

He then began work at Tulsa, Oklahoma TV station KJRH in 1994 where he was the meteorologist for the morning and midday news programs.

== New Orleans and Miami ==
Bernard moved to WWL-TV in New Orleans, Louisiana in 1997. He was the meteorologist for the morning news programs at the station for eight years.

For his coverage of Hurricane Ivan in 2004, Bernard earned critical praise from Dave Walker, TV columnist for the New Orleans Times-Picayune. Walker wrote: “Nuts-and-bolts when he needed to be, Bernard presented potentially terrifying facts with palpable tranquility, and added comprehendible meteorological context to the public-safety discussion. Cool and correct but mostly cool, he was the ideal guide through a few threatening days.”

In the summer of 2005, Bernard left WWL for a new position at Miami TV station WFOR, a CBS affiliate. Six weeks after his departure from New Orleans, he was sent back to New Orleans to cover the aftermath of Hurricane Katrina.

He was named CBS News national hurricane consultant in 2008. He covered hurricanes Gustav, Ike, Isaac, Irene and Sandy for the network on the CBS Evening News, CBS This Morning, Face The Nation and CBS Sunday Morning.

In 2015, Bernard returned to New Orleans working for WVUE-TV. Several months later, he was named chief meteorologist. On Oct. 25, 2022, it was announced that he would be "leaving FOX 8 to pursue new passion".

== Accreditation and honors ==
Bernard is a member of the American Meteorological Society and National Weather Association. He is a Certified Broadcast Meteorologist and former member of the AMS board of broadcast meteorology.

In 2018, Bernard won first prize for best weather anchor and best weathercast in the Louisiana-Mississippi Associated Press competition. The Press Club of New Orleans awarded Bernard the first prize for best weathercast in 2019, 2020, 2021 and 2022.

Bernard was named one of 2021's most influential New Orleanians by New Orleans Adore magazine.

== Personal life ==
In 2019, Bernard married longtime partner Charles Urstadt in New Orleans. Urstadt is a real estate investor and chairman of the Ogden Museum of Southern Art.
