= Philip Bernard (MP) =

English Member of Parliament

Philip Bernard or Barnard (by 1492 – 1538/9), of Great Yarmouth, Norfolk; Akenham, Suffolk and London, was an English Member of Parliament.

He was a Member (MP) of the Parliament of England for Great Yarmouth in 1529.
