= Bennett (name) =

- Pronunciation: /ˈbɛnɪt/

Origin
- Languages: Anglo-Norman, Old French
- Meaning: "blessed"
- Region of origin: England, Ireland, Scotland

Other names
- Variant forms: Benedict, Benoît, Bénet, Bennet, Benatte, Bennatt, Mac Beinéid, MacBennett

Bennett is an English surname and, less commonly, a given name. Alternative spellings include Bennet, Benett, Benet, and Bennette.

It is related to the medieval name Benedict. Bennett is the English spelling of the Anglo-Norman name Ben[n]et (modern French first name Benoît, surname Bénet). The oldest public record of the surname is dated 1208 in County Durham in North East England.

In Ireland, the name is an Irish rendition of Beinéid, which is located in South Leinster. The name is also found throughout the southeastern providence of Ulster in Northern Ireland in the form of "MacBennett" in County Monaghan, County Down, and County Tyrone.

Bennett was also found in Perthshire in Scotland. According to author George F. Black, Benedictus, the son of Walter de Sancto Edmundo, witnessed a charter of sale of land in Perth in 1219.

== People ==
=== Given name ===
People with the given name include:

- Benny Carter (1907–2003), jazz saxophonist, arranger, and composer
- Bennett Cerf (1898–1971), publisher and founder of American publishing firm Random House
- Bennett Champ Clark (1890–1954), American judge and politician
- Ben Cohen (born 1951), American businessman and cofounder of Ben & Jerry's
- Bennett Foddy (born 1978), game designer and philosopher
- Bennett Griffin (1895–1978), American aviator
- Bennett Jackson (born 1991), American football player
- Ben Keith (1937–2010), American musician
- Bennett C. Landreneau (born 1947), United States general
- Bennett Malone (1944–2017), American politician
- Bennett Miller (born 1966), American film director
- Bennet Omalu (born 1968), Nigerian-American pathologist
- Bennett Eli Rappaport (born 1986), American actor
- Bennet C. Riley (1790–1853), United States Army general and politician
- Bennett Salvatore (born 1950), American basketball referee
- Bennett Joseph Savage (born 1980), American actor
- Bennett Stirtz (born 2003), American basketball player
- Bennett Williams (born 1999), American football player
- Bennett H. Young (1843–1919), Confederate Army officer

=== Middle name ===
- Ethel Winifred Bennett Chase (1877–1949), American university professor, botanist and collector
- Sanford Bennett Duryea (1833–1903), American photographer
- Matthias Bennett Gardner (1897–1975), United States Navy Vice admiral
- John Bennett Ramsey (born 1943), American businessman and author
- Edward Bennett Rosa (1873–1921), American physicist
- Austin Bennett Tice (born 1981), American freelance journalist

=== Surname ===
- Abram Bennett (1898–1985), American psychiatrist
- Adam Bennett (born 1971), Canadian ice hockey player and coach
- Adam Bennett Schiff (born 1960), American politician
- Adelaide George Bennett (1848–1911), American poet and botanist
- Alan Bennett (disambiguation)
- Alden I. Bennett (1807–1862), American physician and politician in Ohio and Wisconsin
- Alex Bennett (disambiguation)
- Alf Bennett (1898–?), English footballer with Nottingham Forest and Port Vale
- Alfred Bennett (disambiguation)
- A. L. Bennett Ambrose L. Bennett (1924–2008), American basketball player
- Amelia Bennett (1839–1921) aka Amelia Horne, Amy Haines, British memoir writer
- Andrew Bennett (disambiguation)
- Anne McGrew Bennett (1903–1986), American writer and feminist
- April Steiner Bennett (born 1980), American pole vaulter
- Arekia Bennett, American voting rights activist
- Arnold Bennett (1867–1931), English novelist
- Anthony Bennett (disambiguation)
- Barry Bennett (1955–2019), American football player
- Beck Bennett (born 1984), American comedian and actor
- Belva Ann Bennett (1830–1917), American attorney, politician, educator, and author
- Bert Bennett (1889/1890–1968), English footballer
- Beverly Lynn Bennett (born 1967), American chef
- Bill Bennett (William Richards Bennett 1932–2015), premier of British Columbia
- Blaine Bennett (born c. 1964), American college football coach
- Bob Bennett
  - Bob Bennett (baseball) (1933–2020), American college baseball coach
  - Bob Bennett (politician) (1933–2016), U.S. Senator (R-Utah)
  - Bobby Bennett (disambiguation)
- Brian Bennett (born 1940), English musician and drummer
- Brooke Bennett (born 1980), American swimmer
- Bryan Bennett (born 1992), American football quarterback
- Bruce Bennett (born Harold Herman Brix; 1906–2007), American actor and Olympian
- Carl Bennett (basketball) (1915–2013), American basketball manager and coach
- Carol Bennett (born 1954), American painter and glass artist
- Carolyn Bennett, PC MP (born 1950), Canadian physician and politician
- Carolyn Bennett (comedian) (born 1962), Canadian comedian
- Chance the Rapper (Chancellor Jonathan Bennett), American rapper
- Charles Bennett (disambiguation)
- Chris Bennett (disambiguation)
- Chloe Bennet (born 1992), American singer and actress
- Christiana Bennett, American ballet dancer
- Chuck Bennett (1907–1973), American football player and coach
- Cindy Bennett, American politician
- Claire-Louise Bennett (fl. 2015), Irish writer
- Clarence Edmund Bennett (1803–1932), American Army officer
- Clay Bennett (disambiguation)
  - Clay Bennett (businessman) (born 1959), American businessman
  - Clay Bennett (cartoonist) (born 1958), American editorial cartoonist
- Cole Bennett (born 1996), American videographer and business executive
- Coleman Bennett (born 2002), American football player
- Colin Bennett (disambiguation)
- Constance Bennett (1904–1965), American actress
- Cornelius Bennett (born 1965), American football player
- Crystal Bennett (1918–1987), British archaeologist
- D. M. Bennett (1818–1882), American Shaker and freethinker
- Darren Bennett (disambiguation)
  - Darren Bennett (dancer), (born 1977), professional Latin ballroom dancer
  - Darren Bennett (footballer) (born 1965), Australian football player
- David Bennett (disambiguation)
  - David Bennett (American football) (born 1961), American football coach
  - David Bennett (New Zealand politician) (born 1970), New Zealand politician
  - David Bennett Hill (1843–1910), American politician; Governor of New York State
  - David Bennett McKinley (born 1947), American businessman and politician
- Dayvon Bennett (1994–2020), American rapper known as King Von
- DeAnna Bennett (born 1984), American mixed martial artist
- Deborah J. Bennett (born 1950), American mathematician
- Demi Bennett (born 1996), Australian wrestler, known as Rhea Ripley
- Dick Bennett (born 1943), American basketball coach
- Don Bennett (1910–1986), leader of the Pathfinder force, RAF, World War II
- Don Bennett (disambiguation)
  - Donald W. Bennett (1927–2025), Major General in the United States Air Force
- Drew Bennett (born 1978), American football player
- Dwight Henry Bennett (1917–2002), American aeronautical engineer
- Edgar Bennett (born 1969), American football coach and running back
- Edwin Bennett (disambiguation)
  - Edwin Bennett (potter) (1818–1908)
  - Edwin Keppel Bennett (1887–1958), English academic
- Edward Bennett (disambiguation)
  - Edward Herbert Bennett (1874–1954), American architect and Chicago city planner
  - Edward Turner Bennett (1797–1836), English zoologist
- Ella May Bennett (1855–1932), American Universalist minister
- Elmer Bennett (born 1970), American professional basketball player
- Emerson Bennett (1822–1905), American author
- Eric Bennett (disambiguation)
- Erroll Bennett (1950–2025), French/Tahitian footballer
- Estelle Bennett (1941–2009), American singer (The Ronettes)
- Finn Bennett (born 1999), British-Irish actor
- Fleur Bennett, English actress
- Floyd Bennett, American aviator
- Forrest Bennett, American politician
- Fran Bennett (1937–2021), American actress
- Frank Bennett (disambiguation)
- Fred Bennett (footballer) (1906–1990), English footballer
- Gabriel Bennett (1817–1895), Australian auctioneer of Bennett & Fisher
- Gareth Bennett (disambiguation)
- Gary Bennett (disambiguation)
- George Bennett (disambiguation)
- Gina Bennett, American intelligence analyst and writer
- Gloria Bennett (born 1962), American singer, songwriter, record producer and musician
- Gordon Bennett (disambiguation)
- Granville Bennett (Alabama politician), American farmer and state legislator in Alabama
- Granville G. Bennett (1833–1910), American lawyer and politician
- H. H. Bennett (Henry Hamilton Bennett, 1843–1908), photographer of the Wisconsin Dells
- Haley Bennett (born 1988), American singer and actress
- Hamish Bennett, New Zealand cricketer
- Hamish Bennett (director), New Zealand filmmaker
- Harry Bennett (disambiguation)
- Harve Bennett (1930–2015), American television and film producer
- Henry Bennett (disambiguation)
  - Henry Bennett (American politician) (1808–1868), US Representative from New York)
  - Lt. Henry Boswell Bennett (1809–1838), the first officer to die in the service of Queen Victoria
  - Henry Stanley Bennett (1889–1972), English literary historian
- Herman Bennett (cricketer) (born 1939), Jamaican cricketer
- Herman Bennett (scholar), American scholar
- Hugh Hammond Bennett (1881–1960), founder of the Soil Conservation Service
- Hywel Bennett (1944–2017), Welsh actor
- Jakorian Bennett (born 2000), American football player
- Jack A. W. Bennett (1911–1981), New Zealand scholar of Middle English literature
- Jake Bennett (disambiguation)
  - Jake Bennett (baseball) (born 2000), American baseball player
  - Jake Bennett (footballer) (born 1996), English footballer
- James Bennett (disambiguation), including James, Jimmy, Jimmie, or Jim Bennett
  - James Bennett (potter) (1812–1862)
  - Jimmy Bennett (born 1996), American actor and musician
- Jeff Bennett (disambiguation)
  - Jeff Bennett (born 1962), American voice actor
- Jill Bennett (disambiguation)
  - Jill Bennett (American actress) (born 1975)
  - Jill Bennett (British actress) (1931–1990)
- Joan Bennett (1910–1990), American stage, film and television actress
- Joe Bennett (artist) (born 1968), Brazilian comic book artist
- John Bennett (disambiguation)
  - John J. Bennett Jr. (1894–1967), American lawyer and politician
  - John Joseph Bennett (1801–1876), British botanist
  - John Orus Bennett III (born 1948), American politician from New Jersey
- Jonathan Bennett (disambiguation)
- Joseph Bennett (disambiguation)
- Josephine Bennett (1880–1961), American suffragist and activist
- Josie Bennett (1903–1985), American rodeo professional
- Julian Bennett (disambiguation)
- Justin Bennett (born 1973), American drummer and producer
- Karen Bennett (rower) (born 1989), British rower
- Kay Curley Bennett (1922–1997), Navajo artist and writer
- Keith Bennett (disambiguation)
- Ken Bennett (born 1959), American politician
- Kyle Bennett (disambiguation)
  - Kyle Bennett (footballer) (born 1990), English football midfielder
- Laura Bennett (born 1963), American architect and fashion designer
- Lauren Bennett (1989–2026), English female singer, dancer, and model
- Lawrence E. Bennett (1923–2016), American politician
- Lee Ann Bennett, US air force general
- Lennie Bennett (1938–2009), English comedian and game show host
- Leo Bennett (1914–1971), British first-class cricketer
- Lerone Bennett Jr. (1928–2018), American journalist and writer
- Les Bennett (1918–1999) Footballer for Tottenham Hotspur and West Ham United
- Lilian Bennett (1922–2013), British businesswoman
- Linda L. M. Bennett (born 1952), American administrator and political scientist
- Liz Bennett, American politician; first openly LGBT woman in the Iowa House of Representatives
- Lorna Bennett (born 1977), Jamaican reggae singer
- Louis Bennett (disambiguation), multiple people
- Louise Bennett-Coverley (1919–2006), Jamaican poet, folklorist, writer, and educator
- Lyman Bennett (1801–1877), garment manufacturer
- Lynda Bennett (born 1954), New Zealand lawn bowler
- Manu Bennett (born 1969), Australian actor
- Maria Kanellis-Bennett (Mary Louis Kanellis-Bennett, born 1982), American wrestler
- Mark Bennett (disambiguation), multiple people
- Mark J. Bennett (born 1953), Judge of the United States Court of Appeals
- Marshall Bennett (1915–2018), American real estate developer
- Martellus Demond Bennett (born 1987), American football tight end and children's author
- Martyn Bennett (1971–2005), Canadian-Scottish musician
- Matt Bennett (born 1991), American actor
- Matthew Bennett (disambiguation), multiple people
- Max Bennett (actor) (born 1984), English actor
- Max Bennett (ice hockey) (1912–1972), ice hockey player
- Max Bennett (musician) (1928–2018), American jazz bassist and session musician
- Max Bennett (scientist) (born 1939), Australian neuroscientist
- Mazeo Bennett (born 2005), American football player
- Michael Bennett (disambiguation), mulpiple persons
- Michèle Bennett (born 1950), wife of former Haitian president Jean-Claude Duvalier
- Michele Bennett (film producer), Australian film producer
- Mike Bennett (wrestler) (born 1985), American professional wrestler
- Milton Bennett, American sociologist
- Naftali Bennett (born 1972), Israeli politician; 13th Prime Minister of Israel
- Natalie Bennett (born 1966), politician, Leader of the Green Party of England & Wales
- Nathan Bennett (born 1984), Australian Rugby League player
- Nicholas Bennett (disambiguation), multiple people
- Nigel Bennett (born 1949), English actor
- Nigel Harvie Bennett (1913–2008), English cricketer
- Owen Bennett (born 1985), British journalist
- Paul Bennett (disambiguation), multiple people
- Paul Stuart-Bennett (born 1952), British lightweight rower
- Paula Bennett (born 1969), New Zealand politician
- Paris Bennett (born 1988), American singer
- Pauline Bennett (born 1964), British DJ, dance teacher, and rapper
- Peggy Bennett (born 1958), American politician from Minnesota
- Percy Bennett (1869–1936), Wales rugby union player
- Pete Bennett (born 1982), winner of series 7 of Big Brother UK
- Phillip R. Bennett (born 1948), CEO of Refco
- R. B. Bennett (Richard Bedford Bennett, 1st Viscount Bennett, 1870–1947), Prime Minister of Canada
- Rainey Bennett (1907–1998), American artist and illustrator
- Ralph Bennett (1923–2015), English transport administrator
- Rayshawn Bennett (born 1991), American rapper and singer known professionally as YFN Lucci
- Richard Bennett (Virginia politician) (1608–1675), British colonial governor of Virginia
- Richard Bennett (guitarist) (born 1951), American guitarist and record producer
- Richard Rodney Bennett (1936–2012), English composer
- Rick Bennett (politician) (born 1963), American politician
- Robert Russell Bennett (1894–1981), American composer and arranger
- Rodney D. Bennett (born 1966), American university president
- Rodney Bennett (born 1988), Founder and CEO of SunFlare Brands Company
- Roger Bennett (disambiguation), multiple people
- Ronan Bennett (born 1956), Northern Irish novelist and screenwriter
- Roy Bennett (disambiguation), multiple people
- Ruth L. Bennett (1866–1947), American social reformer
- Ryan Bennett (footballer) (born 1990), English footballer
- Sam Bennett (disambiguation), multiple people
- Sacha Bennett (born 1971), English film director, writer, producer
- Sandy Bennett (Sandra Kaye Bennett born 1972), aka Sandy Hitchcock, New Zealand hockey player
- Sara Bennett, British visual effects artist
- Scott Bennett (disambiguation)
- Sonja Bennett, Canadian actress, screenwriter
- Stella Bennett, New Zealand singer-songwriter
- Stetson Bennett (born 1998), American football player
- Stu Bennett (born 1980), English wrestler, known as Wade Barrett
- Susan Bennett (born 1949), American voice artist; voice of Apple's "Siri"
- Syd Bennett (born 1992), American singer-songwriter, record producer
- Taylor Bennett (rapper) (born 1996), American rapper
- Ted Bennett (born 1940), American politician
- Thomas Bennett Jr. (1781–1865), Governor of South Carolina
- Thomas Jewell Bennett (1852–1925) British politician and journalist with The Times of India
- Thomas M. Bennett (born 1956), American politician (Illinois House of Representatives)
- Thomas Westropp Bennett (1867–1962), Irish politician, magistrate and public figure
- Todd Bennett (1962–2013), English sprinter
- Tony Bennett (disambiguation)
  - Tony Bennett (1926–2023), American vocalist
  - Tony Bennett (American football) (born 1967), American professional football linebacker
  - Tony Bennett (basketball) (born 1969), American basketball player and coach
- Tracie Bennett (born 1961), English stage and television actress
- Veronica Yvette Bennett (1943–2022), American singer
- Vincent Bennett (born 1982), singer of The Acacia Strain
- W. A. C. Bennett (William Andrew Cecil Bennett 1900–1979), Premier of British Columbia
- Wayne Bennett (disambiguation)
- Wilda Bennett (1894–1967), American actress
- William Bennett (disambiguation)
  - William Bennett (born 1943), American conservative pundit and politician
  - Bill Bennett (William Richards Bennett 1932–2015), premier of British Columbia
  - William Bennett Campbell, PC (1943–2008), premier of Prince Edward Island, Canada
  - William Sterndale Bennett (1816–1875), English composer, pianist, conductor, and music educator

== Fictional characters ==
- Agent James Bennett, a character in the DC Animated Universe
- Annie Bennett-Warbucks, protagonist and title character from the Annie musical and film adaptations
- Bonnie Sheila Bennett (of the family line of Bennett witches), a character in The Vampire Diaries
- Capt. Bennett, a character in the 1985 film Commando
- Cybil Bennett, a character in the Silent Hill series
- Dexter Bennett, a character of the fictional New York City tabloid newspaper Daily Bugle
- Ethan Bennett, a character in The Batman
- Emily Bennett, a character in The Vampire Diaries
- Emily Bennett, a character in the American Girl series of dolls and books
- Kay Bennett, a character in Passions
- Wes Bennett, a character in Better Than the Movies
- John Bennett, a character in Orange Is the New Black
- Sheila Bennett, a character in The Vampire Diaries
- Shirley Bennett, a character in Community
- The Bennet family, a family of characters in Pride and Prejudice
- Bennett, a character in 2020 video game Genshin Impact
- Bennett Bramble, a character in Saving Me
- Rue Bennett, a character in Euphoria
- Zora Bennett, a character in Jurassic World Rebirth
- Joe Bennett (of the Bennett werewolf pack) , a character in the Green Creek series of novels by TJ Klune

== See also ==
- Bendt, Bent, Bentt, Benet, Benett, Benetti, Bennet, Bennette, Bennetto, Bennetts, Bennett
