= Louis Bennett =

Louis Bennett may refer to:

- Louis Bennett II (born 1995), American soccer player
- Louis Bennett Jr. (1894–1918), American pilot in World War I
- Louis Bennett (politician) (died 1959), New York lawyer and politician
- Louis Bennett (soccer), English-American soccer coach

== See also ==
- Louie Bennett (1870–1956), Irish suffragette
- Louise Bennett-Coverley (1919–2006), Jamaican poet
- Louis Bennett Field, airport located in West Virginia
