= Francis Bennett =

Francis Bennett may refer to:

- Francis Bennett (writer) (1887–1958), the pseudonym of Edwin Keppel Bennett
- Francis Oswald Bennett (1898–1976), New Zealand doctor, military medical administrator and writer

== See also ==
- Francis Bennett-Goldney (1865–1918), British antiquary, politician and soldier
- Frank Bennett (disambiguation)
