= General Bennett =

General Bennett may refer to:

- Donald V. Bennett (1915–2005), U.S. Army four-star general
- Donald W. Bennett (born 1927), U.S. Air Force major general
- Gordon Bennett (general) (1887–1962), Australian Army lieutenant general
- Juan Pablo Bennett (1871–1951), Chilean Army general
- Phillip Bennett (born 1928), Australian Army general
- Thomas W. Bennett (Idaho politician) (1831–1893), Union Army brevet brigadier general

== See also ==
- John Bradbury Bennet (1865–1930), U.S. Army brigadier general
- Attorney General Bennett (disambiguation)
