= Villette (TV series) =

British television series

- Genre: Period drama
- Based on: Villette by Charlotte Brontë
- Written by: Lennox Phillips
- Directed by: Moira Armstrong
- Starring: Judy Parfitt; Peter Jeffrey; Bryan Marshall
- Country of origin: United Kingdom
- Original language: English
- No. of series: 1
- No. of episodes: 5

Production
- Producer: Martin Lisemore
- Running time: 45 minutes
- Production company: BBC

Original release
- Network: BBC Two
- Release: 31 May – 25 June 1970

Villette is a British television drama series which first aired on BBC 2 between 31 May and 28 June 1970 in five episodes. It is an adaption of the 1853 novel of the same title by Charlotte Brontë. An earlier adaptation of the novel had been produced in 1957 starring Jill Bennett.

== Main cast ==
- Judy Parfitt as Lucy Snowe
- Peter Jeffrey as Paul Emmanuel
- Mona Bruce as Madame Beck
- Bryan Marshall as Dr. John Graham Bretton
- Angela Richards as Ginevra Fanshawe
- Mary Healey as Rosine
- Georgina Simpson as Blanche
- Elspeth Charlton as Isabelle
- Chrissie Shrimpton as Angelique
- Elizabeth Wallace as Zelie St. Pierre
- Joan Heath as Mrs. Bretton
- David Robb as Count de Hamal
- Ann Penfold as Pauline de Bassompierre
- Kevin Stoney as Count de Bassompierre
- Avril Sheridan as Justine-Marie Sauveur

== Bibliography ==
- Baskin, Ellen. Serials on British Television, 1950-1994. Scolar Press, 1996.
- Pinion, F.B. A Brontë Companion: Literary Assessment, Background, and Reference. Barnes & Noble Books, 1975.
