= David Bennett =

David Bennett may refer to:

== Politics and law ==
- David Bennett (barrister) (born 1941), Australian barrister and former solicitor-general of Australia
- David Bennett (New Zealand politician) (born 1970), member of the New Zealand House of Representatives since 2005
- David S. Bennett (1811–1894), U.S. representative from New York
- David Bennett (Rhode Island politician) (born 1955), member of the Rhode Island House of Representatives

== Sports ==
=== Association football ===
- Dave Bennett (footballer, born 1938) (1938–1988), Scottish footballer
- Dave Bennett (footballer, born 1939) (1939–2009), English footballer
- Dave Bennett (footballer, born 1959), English footballer
- Dave Bennett (footballer, born 1960), English footballer

=== Other sports ===
- David Bennett (American football) (born 1961), American football coach
- Dave Bennett (baseball) (born 1945), American baseball pitcher in 1960s
- Jeff Bennett (baseball) (David Jeffrey Bennett, born 1980), American baseball pitcher in 2000s
- Dave Bennett (hurler) (born 1976), Irish hurler

== Other ==
- Avie Bennett (David Bennett, 1928–2017), Canadian businessman and philanthropist
- David Bennett (consultant) (born 1955), British civil servant
- David Bennett (musician) (1823–1902), Canadian musician
- David Bennett (opera director) (born c. 1963), American opera director
- Dave Bennett (software) (born 1965), chief technology officer, Axway
- David Bennett Sr. (1964–2022), first recipient of a genetically modified pig heart xenotransplant
- David Michael Bennett (born 1986), guitarist for Steam Powered Giraffe
- David "Pinkfish" Bennett, lead developer of Discworld MUD
- David Bennett (jeweler), British auctioneer and jeweler
- David Bennett (neurologist), professor of neurology
- David M. Bennett, San Francisco Bay Area businessman

== See also ==
- David Bannett (1921–2022), American-Israeli electronics engineer
- David Bennet, 4th Baronet (died 1741), of the Bennet baronets
