= Trachilos footprints =

Hominin fossil

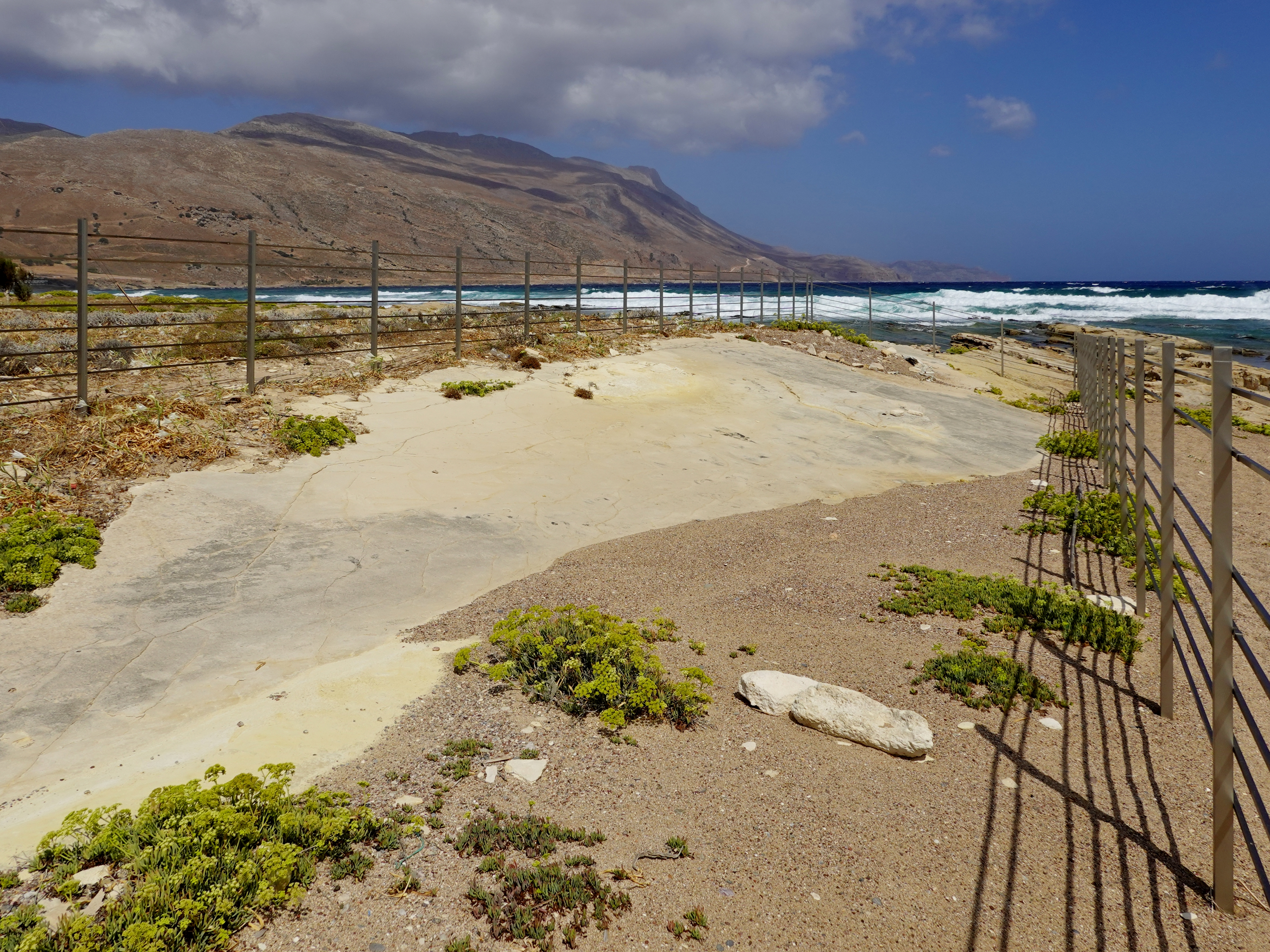
Rock slab with the tracks

The Trachilos footprints are possibly tetrapod footprints from the late Miocene on the western Crete, close to the village of Trachilos, west of Kissamos, in the Chania Prefecture. Some researchers described the tracks as representing at least one apparent bipedal hominin or an unknown primate. The stratum in which the footprints were found was dated to about 5.7 million years ago, which predates the previously earliest discovered hominin footprints by about two million years. Later studies show that the footprints might be more than 6 million years old. The researchers of the tracks suggest that it may imply the possibility of early hominin presence outside of Africa. However, there is no consensus that these impressions are distinct enough to confidently assign to a primate or even a vertebrate, or that they are indeed footprints at all.

== Discovery ==
The tracks were originally discovered by Gerard D. Gierliński, from the Polish Research Institute in Warsaw in 2002. During a visit to Trachilos on Crete, Gierliński found the tracks, and as he was not planning on staying in Trachilos, he recorded the footprints to investigate them in the future. In 2012 Gierliński received permission from the Greek government to research the area, returning to Trachilos with other researchers to explore the tracks in detail. The researchers used methods such as laser scans and 3D imaging of the footprints, and compared them to apes and bears as well as humans.

== Dates ==
The tracks were dated by using the underlying rock bed, predominantly sedimentary, and foraminifera. The study explains, "The coastal rocks at Trachilos[,] lie within the Platanos Basin, and present a succession of shallow marine late Miocene carbonates and siliciclastics[...] At the top, this marine succession terminates abruptly in the coarse-grained terrigenous sedimentary rocks of the Hellenikon Group[.]" The study continues, stating that the sedimentary rocks would have been created around 5.6 million years ago, at the time of the Messinian salinity crisis (mya). The researchers also found evidence of foraminifera, which were dated at 8.5 mya and 3.5 mya. Given the date of the sedimentary rocks and the foraminifera samples, the researches created an approximate interval of 8.5 mya to 5.6 mya. As the rock sediment containing the tracks resembled that of Hellenikon minerals, the tracks were estimated to be 5.7 mya within the given interval.

In 2021, further research was published in regard to dating by Kirscher et al. Cyclostratigraphic data based on magnetic susceptibility indicated that the Trachilos footprints are about 6.05 Ma old, which is 350,000 years older than was found previously. This puts the Trachilos footprints in the same period as the fossils of Orrorin tugenensis from Kenya.

== Characteristics ==
The footprints were measured to range at 94-223 mm (3.7-8.8 inches) long and determined to be oriented in a south-west direction. There are clear pressure indexes, resembling that of a modern Homo sapiens plantigrade structure. The researchers also determined the presence of five digits in the imprints, classifying the track maker as pentadactyl, and lacking claws. As there was no visible evidence of forelimbs from the tracks, the track maker was identified as bipedal. Through 3D printing and laser scanning, there are impressions found which indicate a ball region, a pulling up motion of the foot, a hallux, and small possible gaps between the first and other digit impressions. Poorly preserved prints lack these gaps, however. The lateral digit impressions become progressively smaller so that the digital region as a whole is strongly asymmetrical. The impression of the hallux has a narrow neck and bulbous asymmetrical distal pad, indicating that the tracks were entaxonic. Morphometric analysis showed the footprints to have outlines that are distinct from modern non-hominin primates and resemble those of hominins.

While younger than fossil records of hominins such as Sahelanthropus, found in Chad and dated around seven million years ago, the discovery potentially challenges the generally accepted theory that all early hominins were only present in Africa. The print morphology suggests that the trackmaker could be a basal member of the clade Hominini, but as Crete is some distance outside the known geographical range of pre-Pleistocene hominins, researchers say that there is also a possibility that they represent a hitherto unknown late Miocene primate that convergently evolved human-like foot anatomy.

== News and controversy ==
When Gierliński and his team tried to publish the study, they received harsh criticism due to the findings going against the widely accepted theory of early hominins evolving in Africa alone. The idea behind the "Out-of-Europe" hypothesis is that several great ape species evolved on the Eurasian continent during the Miocene.

According to the study of Gierliński, the Trachilos footprints may represent an early hominin or primate species that may have evolved hominin-like feet independently, outside of Africa. It also suggests the possibility of convergent evolution, wherein unrelated species adapt similar traits and characteristics to each other. Although convergent evolution is not an implausible explanation of the hominin-like trackways,, strong evidence is needed to support this interpretation. There were doubts if the tracks were footprints at all. This resulted in rejections from many scientific journals when offered to publish the study's findings.

In an interview at the CBC News, researchers claimed that while they were trying to publish their work about the footprints at high-profile publications they got "ferociously aggressive responses", criticism and rejection from reviewers and editors. According to the researchers, “Basically, it wasn't a true peer review process at all,” “They were just trying to shut us down.” After multiple rejections from other publications, the study was eventually published in the journal, "Proceedings of the Geologists' Association."

Shortly after the research about the footprints was published, eight prints were chiseled out of the rock and stolen. According to the newspaper Proto Thema, the culprit was a high school teacher, who was later arrested by Crete authorities at Kasteli, Chania. The prints were later found in his house and on a farm.

David Begun, a paleoanthropologist at the University of Toronto, Canada, argues that the footprints might not necessarily belong to a human ancestor, despite its appearance. Similarly, Robin Crompton, a biological anthropologist at the University of Liverpool, England, believes that although the footprints belong to a bipedal organism, they might not be human ancestors but “made by a member of the great ape clade”. Multiple fossilized footprints must be found and analyzed in order to accurately categorize the tracks by species.

Meldrum and Sarmiento (2018) who studied the Trachilos prints (ichnites) did not agree with Gierlinski et al. (2017) that these ichnites were made by a primate or even a vertebrate. Principally, Gierlinski et al. did not provide objective criteria for identifying prints as primate prints. The prints show no consistent and repetitive details that could identify them as being made by a primate, or even an animal with bilateral symmetry. Fatally, Gierlinski et al. did not explore alternative agents that could have produced the prints and provided no explanation as to how their analyses of print outlines deals with missing data and comparisons of non-homologous print outlines. Meldrum and Sarmiento concluded that there was insufficient evidence to argue the prints were made by an animal with bilateral symmetry. The Trachilos ichnites could have been made by non-vertebrate lifeforms or could even be the result of non-organic agents.

Willem Jan Zachariasse and Lucas J. Lourens reestimated the footprints as to have originated at the Late Pliocene (3 mya) and question if hominids had created the footprints or if they were footprints. They argue that the shallow marine setting could not have been travelled across by hominins or bipedal primates but "in case they did, wave action must have erased them unless the tracks were made at the high tide line during a low sea level stand at the climax of one of the glacial periods that occurred every 41 kyr in this time span". Further, they state "Crete was an island since the Late Tortonian but the present outline and geographic setting dates from the Late Pliocene with the deep Levantine Basin to the south and the marine South Aegean Basin (SAB) to the north. The latter basin formed in the Late Miocene by slab roll-back driven extension of the Aegean lithosphere and was ~ 1000 m deep north of Crete (DSDP Site 378) during the Late Pliocene. The Late Pliocene SAB separated Crete from mainland Greece and Turkey by stretches of deep water of minimally 100 km wide according to the time–space reconstructions of the Aegean lithosphere in Van Hinsbergen and Schmid. Occurrences of deep marine Late Pliocene sediments on the islands of Kythira in between Crete and the Peloponnese, and Karpathos in between Crete and Turkey prove that these islands could not have been used as steppingstones for biped dispersal, let alone that they have been part of land bridges".

== Recent geological mapping ==
Recent geological mapping of Upper Cenozoic sediments of northwestern Crete by Zachariasse and van Hinsbergen has shown that the same bioclast-rich sandstones with greyish brown marl flakes from the Trachilos footprint site also occur 2.6 km to the southeast, on a small island just off the coast of Kissamos.

This new observation has important implications for the age and depositional depth of the Trachilos site sediments as published in Zachariasse and Lourens because, unlike the Trachilos site, the small island sediments do have age diagnostic microfossils, namely right coiled representatives of the planktonic foraminiferal species Neogloboquadrina acostaensis. In the uppermost Miocene Mediterranean fossil record, such right-coiled populations occur from 6.34 Ma to well into the Pleistocene.

The impoverished foraminiferal faunas at Trachilos and the small island without Pliocene markers point to a Messinian age of 6.34-6.00 Ma because during this time interval the water exchange between Mediterranean and the Atlantic Ocean deteriorated resulting in increasing salinities and salt deposition at 6.00 Ma. This age is confirmed by a Late Miocene age determination by Marius Stoica for the ostracods from the Trachilos site and the small island.

With this age, the small island sediments belong to the upper part of the Cheretiana Formation, which is one of the formal rock units distinguished in the Upper Cenozoic of northwestern Crete. Due to the fact that the small island sediments are identical to those of the Trachilos footprint site, the latter sediments should also belong to the upper part of Cheretiana Formation.

Zachariasse and van Hinsbergen conclude by stating that because the upper part of the Cheretiana Formation deposited in deep water (≥ 300m), the sediments of the Trachilos footprints site must also have been deposited in deep water which makes it impossible for the so-called footprints to have been made by hominins. The mapped faults in between the small island and Trachilos footprint site are of more recent origin, namely Pleistocene.

== See also ==
- Convergent evolution
- Early expansions of hominins out of Africa
- Messinian salinity crisis
