= Don Bennett (disambiguation) =

Don Bennett (1910–1986) was an Australian aviation pioneer and bomber pilot.

Donald or Don Bennett may also refer to:

- Don Bennett (cricketer) (1933–2014), English cricketer and footballer
- Don Bennett (Alaska politician) (1931–1987), American military officer, businessman, and politician
- Donald Bennett (West Virginia politician)
- Donald V. Bennett (1915–2005), U.S. Army general
- Donald W. Bennett (1927–2025), United States Air Force general
- Don Bennett (baseball) (fl. 1930), American baseball player
- Don Bennett (sprinter) (born 1908), American sprinter, 1932 NCAA 100 m runner-up for the Ohio State Buckeyes track and field team
