= Colin Bennett =

Colin Bennett may refer to:

- Col Bennett (1919–2002), Australian politician
- Colin Bennett (actor) (1944–2024), English actor, writer, and producer
- Colin Bennett (soccer) (born 1950), Australian football player
- Colin Emerson Bennett (1908–1993), Canadian politician and lawyer
- Colin Bennett (film critic) (1929–2022), Australian film critic

== See also ==
- Colin Bennetts (1940–2013), English clergyman, bishop of Coventry
- Cole Bennett (born 1996), American videographer and business executive
- Bennett (name)
