= Edward Bennett =

Edward Bennett may refer to:

- Edward Bennett (actor) (born 1979), English actor
- Edward Bennett (colonist) (1577–before 1651), established the first large plantation in the British North American colonies
- Edward Bennett (director) (born 1950), British television and film director
- Ted Bennett (footballer) (Edward Ernest Bennett, 1925–2018), English footballer
- Edward Bennett (footballer, born 1897) (1897–1957), English footballer
- Teddy Bennett (Edward Bennett, 1862–?), English footballer
- Ned Bennett (Edward Charles Bennett, 1876–1963), Australian rules footballer
- Edward (Wimpy) Bennett (1919–1967), American mobster and loan shark, subject of a murder attempt by mobster James O'Toole
- Edward Bennett (physicist), American physicist (wireless transmission)
- Edward Bennett (rower) (1915–1997), American Olympic rower
- Edward A. Bennett (1920–1983), Medal of Honor recipient
- Edward H. Bennett (1874–1954), American architect
- Edward Hallaran Bennett (1837–1907), Irish surgeon
- Edward Trusted Bennett (1831–1908), English botanist and psychical researcher
- Edward Turner Bennett (1797–1836), English zoologist and writer

== See also ==
- Edward Bennett Rosa (1873–1921), American physicist (measurement systems)
- Edward Bennett Williams (1920–1988), American attorney
