= Granville Bennett =

Granville Bennett may refer to:

- Granville G. Bennett (1833–1910), American lawyer, justice of the Supreme Court for the Dakota Territory, delegate to the U.S. House of Representatives
- Granville Gaylord Bennett (bishop) (1883–1975), American Episcopal bishop
- Granville Bennett, fictionalised name of Denton Pette, small-animal veterinarian immortalised in the books of James Herriot
- Granville Bennett (Alabama politician), American farmer and state legislator in Alabama
