= Herman Bennett =

Herman Bennett may refer to:

- Herman Bennett (cricketer)
- Herman Bennett (scholar)
