= 2019–20 Sheffield United F.C. season =

Sheffield United
2019–20 season
- Manager: Chris Wilder
- Stadium: Bramall Lane
- Premier League: 9th
- FA Cup: Quarter-finals
- EFL Cup: Third round
- Top goalscorer: League: Lys Mousset and Oli McBurnie (6 each); All: Lys Mousset and Oli McBurnie (6 each)
- Highest home attendance: 31,774 (vs. Liverpool, 28 September 2019)
- Lowest home attendance: 9,714 (vs. Blackburn Rovers, 27 August 2019)
- Average home league attendance: 30,758
Home colours	Away colours	Third colours

The 2019–20 season was Sheffield United's 131st season in their history and the first season back in the Premier League since the 2006–07 season after gaining promotion for finishing in the second place in the EFL Championship last season. Along with the Premier League, the club also competed in the FA Cup and EFL Cup. The season covered the period from 1 July 2019 to 26 July 2020.

The season was widely considered one of the best in the history of Sheffield United after finishing 9th and defying all the odds. Before the start of the season, the Blades were tipped to be relegated by most critics and pundits in the Premier League community. Manager Chris Wilder's 5-3-2 'overlapping centre-backs' was praised by many after it dragged a group of relatively below standard players to a top half Premier League finish.

== Kits ==
Home	Home alt.	Away	Away alt.1	Away alt.2	Away alt.3	Third	Third alt.

== Squad ==
=== Appearances and goals ===
As of 20 July 2020

No.	Pos	Nat	Player	Total		Premier League		FA Cup		League Cup	
No.	Pos	Nat	Player	Apps	Goals	Apps	Goals	Apps	Goals	Apps	Goals
Goalkeepers
1	GK	(England) ENG	Dean Henderson	40	0	36	0	3+1	0	0	0
21	GK	(Netherlands) NED	Michael Verrips	1	0	0	0	1	0	0	0
25	GK	(England) ENG	Simon Moore	4	0	2	0	0	0	2	0
Defenders
2	DF	(England) ENG	George Baldock	40	2	38	2	2	0	0	0
3	DF	(Republic of Ireland) IRL	Enda Stevens	40	2	38	2	1	0	0+1	0
5	DF	(England) ENG	Jack O'Connell	35	0	32+1	0	2	0	0	0
6	DF	(England) ENG	Chris Basham	42	0	38	0	3+1	0	0	0
12	DF	(Republic of Ireland) IRL	John Egan	38	2	36	2	2	0	0	0
15	DF	(England) ENG	Phil Jagielka	11	0	2+5	0	2	0	2	0
18	DF	(Wales) WAL	Kieron Freeman	7	0	0+2	0	2+1	0	2	0
19	DF	(England) ENG	Jack Robinson	9	0	6	0	1+2	0	0	0
26	DF	(England) ENG	Jack Rodwell	2	0	0+1	0	1	0	0	0
29	DF	(Greece) GRE	Panagiotis Retsos	1	0	0	0	0+1	0	0	0
Midfielders
4	MF	(Scotland) SCO	John Fleck	32	5	28+2	5	1	0	0+1	0
7	MF	(England) ENG	John Lundstram	35	5	25+8	5	2	0	0	0
8	MF	(England) ENG	Luke Freeman	16	0	3+8	0	3	0	1+1	0
16	MF	(Northern Ireland) NIR	Oliver Norwood	41	3	37+1	1	2	1	1	1
23	MF	(England) ENG	Ben Osborn	18	0	6+7	0	3	0	2	0
27	MF	(Bosnia and Herzegovina) BIH	Muhamed Bešić	13	1	2+7	0	2	1	2	0
32	MF	(Norway) NOR	Sander Berge	16	1	12+2	1	1+1	0	0	0
Forwards
9	FW	(Scotland) SCO	Oli McBurnie	40	6	24+12	6	1+1	0	1+1	0
10	FW	(England) ENG	Billy Sharp	29	4	10+15	3	1+2	1	1	0
17	FW	(Republic of Ireland) IRL	David McGoldrick	30	4	23+5	2	2	2	0	0
22	FW	(France) FRA	Lys Mousset	33	6	9+21	6	1	0	1+1	0
24	FW	(England) ENG	Leon Clarke	5	1	0+2	0	1+1	1	0+1	0
30	FW	(Netherlands) NED	Richairo Zivkovic	5	0	0+5	0	0	0	0+0	0
Player(s) out on loan:
11	FW	(Republic of Ireland) IRL	Callum Robinson	20	2	9+8	1	2	1	1	0
20	DF	(England) ENG	Kean Bryan	3	0	0	0	1	0	2	0
14	MF	(England) ENG	Ravel Morrison	4	0	0+1	0	1	0	2	0
Players who left the club:
19	DF	(England) ENG	Richard Stearman	3	1	0	0	0+1	0	2	1

==== Goals ====
As of 11 August 2020

Rank	No.	Nat.	Po.	Name	Premier League	League Cup	FA Cup	Total
1	9	(Scotland)	CF	Oli McBurnie	6	0	0	6
1	22	(France)	CF	Lys Mousset	6	0	0	6
3	4	(Scotland)	MF	John Fleck	5	0	0	5
3	7	(England)	MF	John Lundstram	5	0	0	5
5	10	(England)	CF	Billy Sharp	3	0	1	4
5	17	(Republic of Ireland)	CF	David McGoldrick	2	0	2	4
7	16	(Northern Ireland)	CM	Oliver Norwood	1	1	1	3
8	2	(England)	DF	George Baldock	2	0	0	2
8	3	(Republic of Ireland)	DF	Enda Stevens	2	0	0	2
8	12	(Republic of Ireland)	DF	John Egan	2	0	0	2
8	11	(Republic of Ireland)	CF	Callum Robinson	1	0	1	2
12	32	(Norway)	CM	Sander Berge	1	0	0	1
12	24	(England)	CF	Leon Clarke	0	0	1	1
12	27	(Bosnia and Herzegovina)	CM	Muhamed Bešić	0	0	1	1
12	19	(England)	DF	Richard Stearman	0	1	0	1
Own Goals					3	0	0	3
Total					39	2	7	48

== Transfers ==
=== Transfers in ===
Date	Position	Nationality	Name	From	Fee	Ref.
1 July 2019	GK	(Malta)	Christopher Farrugia	(Malta) Floriana	Undisclosed	
3 July 2019	AM	(England)	Luke Freeman	(England) Queens Park Rangers	£5,000,000	
4 July 2019	CB	(England)	Phil Jagielka	(England) Everton	Free transfer	
8 July 2019	DF	(England)	Ashton Hall	(England) Matlock Town	Undisclosed	
12 July 2019	LW	(Republic of Ireland)	Callum Robinson	(England) Preston North End	Undisclosed	
16 July 2019	AM	(Jamaica)	Ravel Morrison	(Sweden) Östersund	Free transfer	
21 July 2019	CF	(France)	Lys Mousset	(England) AFC Bournemouth	£10,000,000	
26 July 2019	LM	(England)	Ben Osborn	(England) Nottingham Forest	Undisclosed	
2 August 2019	CF	(Scotland)	Oli McBurnie	(Wales) Swansea City	£20,000,000	
8 August 2019	GK	(Netherlands)	Michael Verrips	(Belgium) Mechelen	Free transfer	
3 January 2020	DM	(England)	Jack Rodwell	(England) Blackburn Rovers	Free transfer	
13 January 2020	DF	(England)	Kamarl Grant	(England) Croydon	Undisclosed	
13 January 2020	MF	(England)	Connor Leak-Blunt	(England) Leeds United	Free transfer	
21 January 2020	LB	(England)	Jack Robinson	(England) Nottingham Forest	Undisclosed	
30 January 2020	DM	(Norway)	Sander Berge	(Belgium) Genk	£22,000,000	

=== Loans in ===
Date from	Position	Nationality	Name	From	Date until	Ref.
26 July 2019	GK	(England)	Dean Henderson	(England) Manchester United	30 June 2020	
8 August 2019	DM	(Bosnia and Herzegovina)	Muhamed Bešić	(England) Everton	30 June 2020	
31 January 2020	CF	(Netherlands)	Richairo Zivkovic	(China) Changchun Yatai	30 June 2020	
31 January 2020	DF	(Greece)	Panagiotis Retsos	(Germany) Bayer Leverkusen	30 June 2020	

=== Loans out ===
Date from	Position	Nationality	Name	To	Date until	Ref.
1 July 2019	MF	(England)	Oliver Greaves	(England) Barrow	30 June 2020	
1 July 2019	LW	(England)	Nathan Thomas	(England) Gillingham	24 July 2019	
2 July 2019	LB	(Wales)	Rhys Norrington-Davies	(England) Rochdale	30 June 2020	
5 July 2019	GK	(England)	Jake Eastwood	(England) Scunthorpe United	30 June 2020	
10 July 2019	ST	(England)	Tyler Smith	(England) Bristol Rovers	15 January 2020	
24 July 2019	LW	(England)	Nathan Thomas	(England) Carlisle United	30 June 2020	
27 July 2019	MF	(England)	Regan Slater	(England) Scunthorpe United	30 June 2020	
5 August 2019	CB	(England)	Sam Graham	(England) Notts County	30 June 2020	
8 August 2019	RM	(England)	Mark Duffy	(England) Stoke City	30 June 2020	
23 August 2019	CB	(England)	Ben Heneghan	(England) Blackpool	30 June 2020	
2 September 2019	CB	(England)	Jake Wright	(England) Bolton Wanderers	5 January 2020	
11 September 2019	GK	(England)	Marcus Dewhurst	(England) Guiseley	31 January 2020	
10 January 2020	LM	(Republic of Ireland)	Stephen Mallon	(Republic of Ireland) Derry City	30 June 2020	
11 January 2020	MF	(England)	Harry Sheppeard	(England) Guiseley	30 June 2020	
15 January 2020	CF	(England)	Tyler Smith	(England) Rochdale	30 June 2020	
24 January 2020	AM	(France)	Iliman Ndiaye	(England) Hyde United	30 June 2020	
28 January 2020	CF	(Northern Ireland)	David Parkhouse	(England) Stevenage	30 June 2020	
29 January 2020	LW	(Republic of Ireland)	Callum Robinson	(England) West Bromwich Albion	30 June 2020	
30 January 2020	CB	(England)	Kean Bryan	(England) Bolton Wanderers	30 June 2020	
31 January 2020	GK	(England)	Marcus Dewhurst	(England) Carlisle United	30 June 2020	
31 January 2020	AM	(Jamaica)	Ravel Morrison	(England) Middlesbrough	30 June 2020	

=== Transfers out ===
Date	Position	Nationality	Name	To	Fee	Ref.
1 July 2019	CM	(Scotland)	Paul Coutts	(England) Fleetwood Town	Released	
1 July 2019	CB	(England)	Martin Cranie	(England) Luton Town	Released	
1 July 2019	LB	(Northern Ireland)	Daniel Lafferty	(Republic of Ireland) Shamrock Rovers	Released	
1 July 2019	CF	(Northern Ireland)	Caolan Lavery	(England) Walsall	Released	
1 July 2019	CF	(Northern Ireland)	Conor Washington	(Scotland) Heart of Midlothian	Released	
6 August 2019	CF	(Wales)	Ched Evans	(England) Fleetwood Town	Undisclosed	
29 August 2019	CM	(Republic of Ireland)	Samir Carruthers	(England) Cambridge United	Mutual consent	
11 October 2019	RB	(England)	Jake Bennett	(England) Alfreton Town	Free transfer	
10 January 2020	CB	(England)	Richard Stearman	(England) Huddersfield Town	Free transfer	
24 January 2020	CB	(Republic of Ireland)	Jordan Doherty	(United States) Tampa Bay Rowdies	Free transfer	
31 January 2020	CB	(England)	Jake Wright	Free agent	Mutual consent	

== Pre-season ==
The Blades announced their pre-season schedule in June 2019.

12 July 2019 Friendly	Real Betis	0–1	Sheffield United	Algarve, Portugal
21:00 WEST		Report	McGoldrick 63'	Stadium: Estádio Algarve

16 July 2019 Friendly	Burton Albion	2–1	Sheffield United	Burton upon Trent
19:45 BST	Brayford 40'; Harness 90+1'	Report	Sharp 16'	Stadium: Pirelli Stadium

20 July 2019 Friendly	Northampton Town	0–2	Sheffield United	Sixfields
15:00 BST		Report	Norwood 23' (pen.), 43' (pen.)	Stadium: The PTS Academy Stadium; Attendance: 3,825

23 July 2019 Friendly	Chesterfield	0–5	Sheffield United	Chesterfield
19:30 BST		Report	Sharp 34', 63', 76'; Robinson 48'; Freeman 90'	Stadium: Proact Stadium; Attendance: 6,270

27 July 2019 Friendly	Barnsley	1–4	Sheffield United	Barnsley
12:00 BST	McGeehan 54'	Report	Osborn 20'; Robinson 57', 74'; Freeman 89'	Stadium: Oakwell

3 August 2019 Friendly	Reims	3–1	Sheffield United	Reims, France
17:30 BST	Romao 27'; Oudin 51'; Chavalerin 57'	Report	Robinson 10'	Stadium: Stade Auguste-Delaune

== Competitions ==
=== Premier League ===
==== League table ====
Pos	Team	Pld	W	D	L	GF	GA	GD	Pts	Qualification or relegation
7	Wolverhampton Wanderers	38	15	14	9	51	40	+11	59	
8	Arsenal	38	14	14	10	56	48	+8	56	Qualification for the Europa League group stage (Note: Arsenal qualified for the Europa League group stage as the 2019–20 FA Cup winners.)
9	Sheffield United	38	14	12	12	39	39	0	54	
10	Burnley	38	15	9	14	43	50	−7	54	
11	Southampton	38	15	7	16	51	60	−9	52	

Source: Premier League
Rules for classification: 1) Points; 2) Goal difference; 3) Goals scored; 4) If the champions, relegated teams or qualified teams for UEFA competitions cannot be determined by rules 1 to 3, rules 4.1 to 4.3 are applied – 4.1) Points gained in head to head record between such teams; 4.2) Away goals scored in head to head record between such teams; 4.3) Play-offs

==== Results summary ====
Overall								Home						Away					
Pld	W	D	L	GF	GA	GD	Pts	W	D	L	GF	GA	GD	W	D	L	GF	GA	GD
38	14	12	12	39	39	0	54	10	3	6	24	15	+9	4	9	6	15	24	−9

Last updated: 26 July 2020.

==== Results by matchday ====
Matchday	1	2	3	4	5	6	7	8	9	10	11	12	13	14	15	16	17	18	19	20	21	22	23	24	25	26	27	28	29	30	31	32	33	34	35	36	37	38
Ground	A	H	H	A	H	A	H	A	H	A	H	A	H	A	H	A	H	A	H	A	A	H	A	H	A	H	H	H	A	A	A	H	A	H	H	A	H	A
Result	D	W	L	D	L	W	L	D	W	D	W	D	D	D	L	W	W	W	D	L	L	W	D	L	W	W	D	W	D	L	L	W	D	W	W	L	L	L
Position	9	8	9	10	15	10	12	13	9	8	6	5	6	7	9	8	7	5	6	8	8	6	7	8	6	5	6	7	6	7	8	7	9	7	7	8	8	9

Updated to match(es) played on 26 July 2020. Source:
A = Away; H = Home; W = Win; D = Draw; L = Loss

==== Matches ====
On 13 June 2019, the Premier League fixtures were announced.

10 August 2019 1	Bournemouth	1–1	Sheffield United	Kings Park
15:00 BST	Smith (yellow card) 43'; Mepham 62'; Fraser (yellow card) 64'	Report	Fleck (yellow card) 78'; Sharp 88'	Stadium: Vitality Stadium; Attendance: 10,714; Referee: Kevin Friend

18 August 2019 2	Sheffield United	1–0	Crystal Palace	Sheffield
14:00 BST	Lundstram (yellow card) 7', (goal) 47'; Baldock (yellow card) 74'; Freeman (yellow card) 85'	Report	McCarthy (yellow card) 74'	Stadium: Bramall Lane; Attendance: 30,197; Referee: David Coote

24 August 2019 3	Sheffield United	1–2	Leicester City	Sheffield
15:00 BST	Lundstram (yellow card) 57'; McBurnie 62'	Report	Vardy 38'; Barnes 70'	Stadium: Bramall Lane; Attendance: 30,079; Referee: Andrew Madley

31 August 2019 4	Chelsea	2–2	Sheffield United	London
15:00 BST	Abraham 19', 43'	Report	McBurnie (yellow card) 45+1'; Robinson 46'; Zouma 89' (o.g.)	Stadium: Stamford Bridge; Attendance: 40,560; Referee: Stuart Attwell

14 September 2019 5	Sheffield United	0–1	Southampton	Sheffield
15:00 BST	Fleck (yellow card) 65'; Sharp (red card) 85'	Report	Vestergaard (yellow card) 51'; Djenepo 66'	Stadium: Bramall Lane; Attendance: 30,985; Referee: Lee Mason

21 September 2019 6	Everton	0–2	Sheffield United	Liverpool
15:00 BST	Bernard (yellow card) 21'	Report	Norwood (yellow card) 16'; Baldock (yellow card) 21'; Henderson (yellow card) 21'; Mina 40' (o.g.); Mousset 79'	Stadium: Goodison Park; Attendance: 39,354; Referee: Simon Hooper

28 September 2019 7	Sheffield United	0–1	Liverpool	Sheffield
12:30 BST	O'Connell (yellow card) 63'	Report	Wijnaldum 70'; Adrián (yellow card) 83'	Stadium: Bramall Lane; Attendance: 31,774; Referee: Anthony Taylor
Note: Live on BT Sport

5 October 2019 8	Watford	0–0	Sheffield United	Watford
15:00 BST		Report	McBurnie (yellow card) 57'; Lundstram (yellow card) 90+1'	Stadium: Vicarage Road; Attendance: 20,811; Referee: Andre Marriner

21 October 2019 9	Sheffield United	1–0	Arsenal	Sheffield
20:00 BST	Fleck (yellow card) 15'; Mousset 30'; O'Connell (yellow card) 39'; McGoldrick (yellow card) 66'; Henderson (yellow card) 75'	Report	Saka (yellow card) 35'; Kolašinac (yellow card) 67'; Papastathopoulos (yellow card) 86'; Chambers (yellow card) 90+3'	Stadium: Bramall Lane; Attendance: 30,775; Referee: Mike Dean

26 October 2019 10	West Ham United	1–1	Sheffield United	Stratford
15:00 BST	Diop (yellow card) 28'; Snodgrass 44'; Balbuena (yellow card) 62'	Report	Baldock (yellow card) 59'; Mousset 69'; Stevens (yellow card) 90+2'	Stadium: London Stadium; Attendance: 59,878; Referee: David Coote

2 November 2019 11	Sheffield United	3–0	Burnley	Sheffield
15:00 GMT	Lundstram 17', 43'; Fleck 44'; Basham (yellow card) 89'	Report	Tarkowski (yellow card) 34'; Barnes (yellow card) 68'	Stadium: Bramall Lane; Attendance: 31,131; Referee: Simon Hooper

9 November 2019 12	Tottenham Hotspur	1–1	Sheffield United	Tottenham
15:00 GMT	Dier (yellow card) 2'; Son 58'; Foyth (yellow card) 80'	Report	Norwood (yellow card) 18'; Baldock 78'; Basham (yellow card) 90+1'	Stadium: Tottenham Hotspur Stadium; Attendance: 59,781; Referee: Graham Scott

24 November 2019 13	Sheffield United	3–3	Manchester United	Sheffield
16:30 GMT	Fleck 19'; Lundstram (yellow card) 51'; Mousset 52'; McBurnie 90'	Report	Williams (yellow card) 50', (goal) 72'; Wan-Bissaka (yellow card) 60'; Greenwood 77'; Rashford 79'	Stadium: Bramall Lane; Attendance: 32,024; Referee: Andre Marriner

1 December 2019 14	Wolverhampton Wanderers	1–1	Sheffield United	Wolverhampton
14:00 GMT	Dendoncker (yellow card) 3'; Doherty 64'	Report	Mousset 2'; Stevens (yellow card) 15'; Fleck (yellow card) 43'; Baldock (yellow card) 54'; O'Connell (yellow card) 63'; Egan (yellow card) 90'	Stadium: Molineux Stadium; Attendance: 31,642; Referee: David Coote

5 December 2019 15	Sheffield United	0–2	Newcastle United	Sheffield
19:30 GMT	Sharp (yellow card) 49'; Freeman (yellow card) 87'	Report	Saint-Maximin 15'; Shelvey 70'	Stadium: Bramall Lane; Attendance: 30,409; Referee: Stuart Attwell

8 December 2019 16	Norwich City	1–2	Sheffield United	Norwich
14:00 GMT	Tettey 27'	Report	Norwood (yellow card) 40'; Egan (yellow card) 45+1'; Stevens 49'; Baldock 52'; Basham (yellow card) 76'; Robinson (yellow card) 90+6'	Stadium: Carrow Road; Attendance: 26,881; Referee: Simon Hooper

14 December 2019 17	Sheffield United	2–0	Aston Villa	Sheffield
15:00 GMT	Norwood (yellow card) 12'; Fleck (yellow card) 16', (goal) 50', 73'	Report	Hause (yellow card) 64'; Targett (yellow card) 69'	Stadium: Bramall Lane; Attendance: 30,396; Referee: Peter Bankes

21 December 2019 18	Brighton & Hove Albion	0–1	Sheffield United	Falmer
15:00 GMT	Bissouma (yellow card) 87'	Report	McBurnie 23'; Stevens (yellow card) 75'; Basham (yellow card) 83'; McGoldrick (yellow card) 85'	Stadium: Falmer Stadium; Attendance: 30,505; Referee: Robert Jones

26 December 2019 19	Sheffield United	1–1	Watford	Sheffield
15:00 GMT	Norwood 36' (pen.)	Report	Deulofeu 27', (yellow card) 74'; Cathcart (yellow card) 46'; Chalobah (yellow card) 88'	Stadium: Bramall Lane; Attendance: 30,222; Referee: David Coote

29 December 2019 20	Manchester City	2–0	Sheffield United	Manchester
18:00 GMT	Agüero 52'; B. Silva (yellow card) 59'; De Bruyne 82'	Report	Stevens (yellow card) 85'	Stadium: City of Manchester Stadium; Attendance: 54,512; Referee: Chris Kavanagh

2 January 2020 21	Liverpool	2–0	Sheffield United	Liverpool
20:00 GMT	Salah 4'; Mané 64'	Report		Stadium: Anfield; Attendance: 53,321; Referee: Paul Tierney

10 January 2020 22	Sheffield United	1–0	West Ham United	Sheffield
20:00 GMT	McBurnie 53'; Bešić (yellow card) 86'	Report		Stadium: Bramall Lane; Attendance: 30,124; Referee: Michael Oliver

18 January 2020 23	Arsenal	1–1	Sheffield United	Holloway
15:00 GMT	Martinelli 45'; Xhaka (yellow card) 90+1'	Report	Norwood (yellow card) 4'; Baldock (yellow card) 51'; Fleck 83'	Stadium: Emirates Stadium; Attendance: 60,310; Referee: Mike Dean

21 January 2020 24	Sheffield United	0–1	Manchester City	Sheffield
19:30 GMT	Bešić (yellow card) 13'; Norwood (yellow card) 24'; Fleck (yellow card) 43'; McBurnie (yellow card) 84'	Report	Jesus (penalty missed) 36'; Fernandinho (yellow card) 45+2'; Rodri (yellow card) 53'; Agüero 73', (yellow card) 83'	Stadium: Bramall Lane; Attendance: 31,285; Referee: Lee Mason

1 February 2020 25	Crystal Palace	0–1	Sheffield United	Selhurst
15:00 GMT	Tomkins (yellow card) 24'; Milivojević (yellow card) 67'; Ward (yellow card) 74'	Report	Baldock (yellow card) 18'; Guaita 58' (o.g.); Fleck (yellow card) 68'	Stadium: Selhurst Park; Attendance: 25,170; Referee: Andrew Madley

9 February 2020 26	Sheffield United	2–1	Bournemouth	Sheffield
14:00 GMT	Stevens (yellow card) 39'; Sharp 45+2'; Lundstram 84'; Mousset (yellow card) 89'	Report	C. Wilson 13'; Surman (yellow card) 53'; Francis (yellow card) 90+4'	Stadium: Bramall Lane; Attendance: 30,361; Referee: Jon Moss

22 February 2020 27	Sheffield United	1–1	Brighton & Hove Albion	Sheffield
15:00 GMT	Stevens 26'	Report	Bissouma (yellow card) 10'; Pröpper (yellow card) 23'; Maupay 30'	Stadium: Bramall Lane; Attendance: 31,888; Referee: Graham Scott

7 March 2020 28	Sheffield United	1–0	Norwich City	Sheffield
15:00 GMT	Sharp 36'	Report		Stadium: Bramall Lane; Attendance: 31,379; Referee: Simon Hooper

17 June 2020 29	Aston Villa	0–0	Sheffield United	Aston
18:00 BST	Douglas Luiz (yellow card) 27'	Report	Lundstram (yellow card) 36'	Stadium: Villa Park; Attendance: 0 Referee: Michael Oliver
Note: The match was postponed due to Aston Villa's participation in the EFL Cup Final on 1 March, then again because of the coronavirus pandemic. It was rescheduled to 17 June. Live on Sky Sports.

21 June 2020 30	Newcastle United	3–0	Sheffield United	Newcastle
14:00 BST	Joelinton (yellow card) 31', (goal) 78'; Saint-Maximin 55'; Ritchie 69'; Lascelles (yellow card) 70'	Report	Egan (yellow card) 31' (yellow-red card) 50'	Stadium: St James' Park; Attendance: 0 Referee: David Coote
Note: The match was postponed on 13 March due to concerns over the coronavirus pandemic, It was rescheduled to 21 June.

24 June 2020 31	Manchester United	3–0	Sheffield United	Manchester
18:00 BST	Martial 7', 44', 74'; Shaw (yellow card) 67'	Report		Stadium: Old Trafford; Attendance: 0 Referee: Anthony Taylor
Note: The match was postponed on 13 March due to concerns over the coronavirus pandemic, It was rescheduled to 24 June.

2 July 2020 32	Sheffield United	3–1	Tottenham Hotspur	Sheffield
18:00 BST	Berge 31'; Norwood (yellow card) 39'; Mousset 69'; McBurnie 84', (yellow card) 89'	Report	Kane 90'	Stadium: Bramall Lane; Attendance: 0 Referee: Chris Kavanagh
Note: The match was postponed on 19 March due to concerns over the coronavirus pandemic. It was rescheduled to 2 July.

5 July 2020 33	Burnley	1–1	Sheffield United	Burnley
12:00 BST	Tarkowski 43'	Report	Egan 80'	Stadium: Turf Moor; Attendance: 0 Referee: Peter Bankes
Note: The match was postponed on 19 March due to concerns over the coronavirus pandemic. It was rescheduled to 5 July.

8 July 2020 34	Sheffield United	1–0	Wolverhampton Wanderers	Sheffield
18:00 BST	O'Connell (yellow card) 30'; Stevens (yellow card) 63'; Egan 90+4'	Report		Stadium: Bramall Lane; Attendance: 0 Referee: Martin Atkinson
Note: The match was postponed on 3 April due to concerns over the coronavirus pandemic. It was rescheduled to 8 July.

11 July 2020 35	Sheffield United	3–0	Chelsea	Sheffield
17:30 BST	Baldock (yellow card) 3'; McGoldrick 18', 77'; McBurnie 33'	Report		Stadium: Bramall Lane; Attendance: 0 Referee: Andre Marriner
Note: The match was postponed on 3 April due to concerns over the coronavirus pandemic. It was rescheduled to 11 July.

16 July 2020 36	Leicester City	2–0	Sheffield United	Leicester
18:00 BST	Pérez 29'; Evans (yellow card) 75'; Gray 79'	Report	Egan (yellow card) 80'; Fleck (yellow card) 90+2'	Stadium: King Power Stadium; Attendance: 0 Referee: Michael Oliver
Note: The match was postponed on 3 April due to concerns over the coronavirus pandemic. It was rescheduled to 16 July.

20 July 2020 37	Sheffield United	0–1	Everton	Sheffield
18:00 BST	Norwood (yellow card) 45+2'	Report	Davies (yellow card) 33'; Richarlison 46', (yellow card) 90'; Calvert-Lewin (yellow card) 78'	Stadium: Bramall Lane; Attendance: 0 Referee: Stuart Attwell
Note: The match was postponed on 3 April due to concerns over the coronavirus pandemic. It was rescheduled to 20 July.

26 July 2020 38	Southampton	3–1	Sheffield United	Southampton
16:00 BST	Adams 50', 71'; Ings 84' (pen.)	Report	Lundstram 26'; Stevens (yellow card) 90+3'	Stadium: St. Mary's Stadium; Attendance: 0 Referee: Peter Bankes
Note: The match was postponed on 3 April due to concerns over the coronavirus pandemic. It was rescheduled to 26 July.

=== FA Cup ===
The third round draw was made live on BBC Two from Etihad Stadium, Micah Richards and Tony Adams conducted the draw. The fourth round draw was made by Alex Scott and David O'Leary on Monday, 6 January. The draw for the fifth round was made on 27 January 2020, live on The One Show.

5 January 2020 Third round	Sheffield United	2–1	AFC Fylde	Sheffield
15:00 GMT	Robinson 8'; Osborn (yellow card) 45'; Clarke 60'	Report	Williams 78'	Stadium: Bramall Lane; Attendance: 11,133; Referee: Jarred Gillett

25 January 2020 Fourth round	Millwall	0–2	Sheffield United	Bermondsey
15:00 GMT		Report	Bešić 62'; Freeman (yellow card) 69'; Norwood 84'	Stadium: The Den; Attendance: 12,653; Referee: Anthony Taylor

3 March 2020 Fifth round	Reading	1–2 (a.e.t.)	Sheffield United	Reading
20:00 GMT	Pușcaș 43' (pen.); Rinomhota (yellow card) 51'	Report	McGoldrick 2'; Sharp 105+1'; Retsos (yellow card) 120'	Stadium: Madejski Stadium; Attendance: 15,129; Referee: Kevin Friend

28 June 2020 Quarter-finals	Sheffield United	1–2	Arsenal	Sheffield
13:00 BST	Fleck (yellow card) 31'; Robinson (yellow card) 75'; McGoldrick 87'	Report	Pépé 25' (pen.); Ceballos 90+1'	Stadium: Bramall Lane; Attendance: 0 Referee: Paul Tierney
Note: The match was postponed due to the COVID-19 pandemic, and rescheduled to 28 June.

=== EFL Cup ===
The second round draw was made on 13 August 2019 following the conclusion of all but one first-round matches. The third round draw was confirmed on 28 August 2019, live on Sky Sports.

27 August 2019 Second round	Sheffield United	2–1	Blackburn Rovers	Sheffield
19:45 BST	Stearman (yellow card) 7', (goal) 31'; Norwood 45+3'; Morrison (yellow card) 90+1'	Report	Gallagher 72'; Lenihan (yellow card) 78'; Cunningham (yellow card) 89'	Stadium: Bramall Lane; Attendance: 9,714; Referee: Geoff Eltringham

25 September 2019 Third round	Sheffield United	0–1	Sunderland	Sheffield
19:45 BST	Fleck (yellow card) 77'	Report	Power 9'; Maguire (yellow card) 90'	Stadium: Bramall Lane; Attendance: 11,675; Referee: Tim Robinson
