= Bobby Bennett =

Bobby Bennett may refer to:

- Bobby Bennett (American Idol), American singer
- Bobby Bennett (The Famous Flames) (1938–2013), American singer (The Famous Flames)
- Bobby Bennett (footballer) (born 1951), English footballer

== See also ==
- Robert Bennett (disambiguation)
