= Michael Bennett =

Michael or Mike Bennett may refer to:

== Arts ==
- Mike Bennett (artist), American artist
- Michael Bennett (film director), New Zealand writer and director
- Michael Bennett (theater) (1943–1987), American musical theater director, writer, choreographer, and dancer
- Mike Bennett (writer) (born 1962), British script writer, playwright and record producer
- Michael Bennett (book series), a series of thriller books by best-selling author James Patterson
- Mikey Bennett, Jamaican music producer, composer, musician and singer

== Politics ==
- Michael John Bennett (1860–1944), American politician from Wisconsin
- Mike Bennett (politician) (born 1945), American politician from Florida

== Sports ==
- Michael Bennett (boxer) (born 1971), American professional boxer
- Michael Bennett (cricketer) (1909–1982), Somerset cricketer
- Michael Bennett (cyclist) (born 1949), British Olympic cyclist
- Michael Bennett (defensive lineman, born 1985), American football player
- Michael Bennett (defensive tackle, born 1993), American football player
- Michael Bennett (running back) (born 1978), American football player
- Michael Bennett (wide receiver) (born 1991), American football player
- Mickey Bennett (born 1969), English association football player
- Mike Bennett (rugby league) (born 1980), English professional rugby league player
- Mike Bennett (wrestler) (born 1985), American professional wrestler
- Mike Bennett (born 1967), of the professional golf instructing duo Mike Bennett and Andy Plummer
- M. S. Bennett (1881–1964), American college football player and coach

== See also ==
- Bennett (name)
- Gary Michael Bennett (born 1963), English footballer
- Micky Bennett (William Bennett, c. 1862–1919), English footballer
- Michael Bennet, American politician
