= Matthew Bennett (disambiguation) =

Matthew Bennett (born 1968) is a Canadian actor, writer and director.

Matthew Bennett or Matt Bennett may also refer to:

- Matt Bennett (born 1991), American actor
- Matthew Bennett (cricketer) (born 1982), English cricketer
- Matthew Bennett (geographer), British geologist
- Matthew Bennett (historian) (born 1954), British military historian and Sandhurst lecturer
- Matthew Bennett (lacrosse) (born 1993), Canadian lacrosse player
- Matthew Bennett (politician) (1862–1951), Australian politician
- Matthew Bennett (TV producer), American television producer
