= Harry Bennett (disambiguation) =

Harry Bennett (1892–1979) was an American businessman.

Harry Bennett may also refer to:

- Harry Scott Bennett (1877–1959), Australian socialist speaker and organiser
- Harry Bennett (cricketer) (1859–1898), Australian cricketer
- Harry Bennett, coach of Liz McColgan
- Harry Bennett, witness against Dixie Mafia
- Harry Bennett, character in List of The Good Life episodes

== See also ==
- Henry Bennett (disambiguation)
- Harold Bennett (disambiguation)
