= Alan Bennett (disambiguation) =

Alan Bennett (born 1934) is an English author and actor.

Alan Bennett may also refer to:

- Alan Bennett (footballer, born 1931) (1931–2006), English footballer for Port Vale
- Alan Bennett (footballer, born 1949), Scottish footballer for Dumbarton FC
- Alan Bennett (footballer, born 1981), Irish footballer for Cork City and Ireland
- Alan Bennett (tenor) (born 1962), American operatic/oratorio tenor
- Charles Henry Allan Bennett (1872–1923), known as Ananda Metteyya, Buddhist monk
