= Jake Bennett =

Jake Bennett may refer to:

- Jake Bennett (baseball) (born 2000), American baseball player
- Jake Bennett (footballer) (born 1996), English footballer
