= Alfred Bennett =

Alfred or Alf Bennett may refer to:

- Alfred Bennett (Australian politician) (1906–1976), Australian Labor Party member of the New South Wales Legislative Assembly
- Alfred Bennett (broadcaster) (1889–1963), Australian broadcasting executive
- Alfred H. Bennett (born 1965), American judge
- Alfred J. Bennett (1861–1923), English artist
- Alfred Rosling Bennett (1850–1928), British electrical engineer
- Alfred S. Bennett (1854–1925), American judge
- Alfred William Bennett (1833–1902), British botanist and publisher
- Alfred Gordon Bennett (1901–1962), English novelist and poet
- Alf Bennett (1898–1963), English footballer
