= Attorney General Bennett =

Attorney General Bennett may refer to:

- John J. Bennett Jr. (1894–1967), Attorney General of New York
- Mark J. Bennett (born 1953), Attorney General of Hawaii

== See also ==
- General Bennett (disambiguation)
