= Anthony Bennett =

Anthony or Tony Bennett may refer to:

== Politics ==
- Anthony Bennett (MP), MP for Bodmin in 1593
- Anthony Bennett (Veritas politician) (born 1947), British former political candidate and current campaigner
- Tony L. Bennett (1940–2022), American politician and police officer

== Sports ==
- Anthony Bennett (basketball) (born 1993), Canadian basketball player
- Anthony Bennett (gridiron football) (born 1996), American football defensive lineman in the Canadian Football League
- Tony Bennett (American football) (born 1967), American former football linebacker in the National Football League
- Tony Bennett (basketball) (born 1969), American basketball coach and former player

== Others ==
- Anthony Bennett (artist) (born 1966), Australian artist
- Tony Bennett (1926–2023), American pop and jazz singer
- Tony Bennett (sociologist) (born 1947), Australian academic and cultural theorist
- Tony Bennett (superintendent) (born 1960), American official, former Indiana State Superintendent and former Florida Commissioner of Education
