= Henry Bennett =

Henry Bennett or Bennet may refer to:

- Henry Bennet, 1st Earl of Arlington (1618–1685), English statesman
- Henry Bennett (American politician) (1808–1874), U.S. representative from New York
- Henry Boswell Bennett (1809–1838), British officer who died in service of Queen Victoria
- Henry G. Bennett (1886–1951), prominent educational figure in Oklahoma
- Gordon Bennett (general) (Henry Gordon Bennett, 1887–1962), Australian general
- Henry Holcomb Bennett (1863–1924), American writer
- Henry Bennett (rose hybridizer) (1823–1890), British pioneer in the systematic, deliberate hybridisation of roses
- Henry Curtis-Bennett (1879–1936), English barrister and member of parliament
- Henry R. Bennett (c. 1819–c. 1896), English organist
- Henry Bennet (translator) (fl. 1561), English translator of Protestant literature
- Henry Grey Bennet (1777–1836), British politician
- Henry Bennett (cricketer) (1869–1965), English cricketer
- Henry Stanley Bennett (1889–1972), English literary historian

== See also ==
- J. Henry Bennett (1876–1956), member of the Wisconsin State Senate
- Harry Bennett (disambiguation)
