= Edwin Bennett =

Edwin Bennett may refer to:

- Edwin Bennett (cricketer) (1893–1929), English cricketer
- Edwin Keppel Bennett (1887–1958), English writer, poet, Germanist and academic
- Edwin Bennett (potter) (1818–1908), English American pioneer of the pottery industry and art in the United States
