= Harold Bennett (disambiguation) =

Harold Bennett (1898–1981) was an English actor.

Harold Bennett may also refer to:

- Harold Bennett (footballer) (1891–1964), Australian rules footballer
- Harold Aubie Bennett (1891–1978), British musician
- Harold Harper Bennett (1900–1999), American business leader and singer
- Hal Bennett (1936–2004), American author
- Harold Bennett, pseudonym of Henry Fillmore (1881–1956), American musician, composer, publisher and bandleader

== See also ==
- Harry Bennett (disambiguation)
- Harold William Bennetts (1898–1970), Australian veterinary surgeon
