= Scott Bennett =

Scot(t) Bennett may refer to:

- Scott Bennett (footballer) (born 1980), Australian rules footballer
- Scott Bennett (musician), musician for Brian Wilson
- Scott M. Bennett (1977–2022), American lawyer and politician
- D. Scott Bennett (born 1960), American political scientist
- Scot Bennett (born 1990), English footballer for Newport County
- Harry Scott Bennett (1877–1959), Australian socialist speaker and organiser
