= Clay Bennett =

Clay Bennett may refer to:

- Clay Bennett (cartoonist) (born 1958), American editorial cartoonist
- Clay Bennett (businessman) (born 1959), American businessman and chairman of Oklahoma City Thunder ownership group
