= Geoffrey Bennett =

Geoffrey, Geoff or Jeff Bennett may refer to:

- Geoffrey Thomas Bennett (1868–1943), English mathematician
- Geoffrey Bennett (historian) (1909–1983), British Royal Navy officer and author
- Geoff Bennett (speedway rider) (1924–2014), English speedway rider
- Geoff Bennett (field hockey) (1926–2002), Australian field hockey player
- Jeff Bennett (decathlete) (born 1948), American decathlete
- Jeff Bennett (born 1962), American voice actor
- Geoff Bennett (journalist) (born 1980), American journalist and television news presenter
- Jeff Bennett (baseball) (born 1980), American baseball pitcher
- Jeff Bennett, fictional character in the TV series Taxi
