= Julian Bennett =

Julian Bennett may refer to:

- Julian Bennett (footballer) (born 1984), English footballer
- Julian Bennett (archaeologist) (1949–2025), British archaeologist
- Julian Bennett (politician) (1929–2013), Democratic politician and a member of the Florida House of Representatives
