= Arekia Bennett =

American civil rights activist

- Born: Jackson, Mississippi, US
- Education: Jackson State University (BS)
- Known for: Executive director of Mississippi Votes

Arekia Bennett is an American activist and the executive director of Mississippi Votes, a nonprofit organization focused on promoting voter registration. Bennett leads efforts to reach young and underrepresented voters in Mississippi through voter drives, community education, and civic protests.

== Early life and education ==
Bennett is a native of Jackson, Mississippi. She graduated from Jackson State University with a Bachelor of Science in physics. Bennett originally wanted to be a physics teacher before becoming interested in civic activism after realising that all of the issues she cared about had elected officials trying to control them. While at Jackson State, Bennett founded GIRL (Gathering Information Related to Ladies), an organization focused on advocacy, countering "problematic university policy", and helping to educate about African American women's history.

As a young woman in the Deep South, I started to understand that there were so many issues I cared about, like control over my own body, that were intrinsically tied to the electoral process. For any particular issue, there was an elected official trying to control that part of my life.

— Arekia Bennett

== Career ==
Bennett is the executive director of Mississippi Votes, a nonprofit organization focused on promoting voter registration and organizing voter registration drives. Bennett has cited Freedom Summer, a large voter outreach effort that took place in Mississippi in 1964, as inspiration in leading mass voter registration efforts in 2017. In 2020, Bennett and Mississippi Votes helped to organize one of the largest protests in Mississippi's history, driven by the murder of George Floyd and the redesign of the Mississippi state flag. Bennett cites traditionally low participation rates from youth voters as a driving factor behind the mission of Mississippi Votes.

In her role as executive director, Bennett has expanded the focus of Mississippi Votes to include voters under the age of 35, young queer people, and children or adults who have gone through the juvenile justice system. In 2019, Bennett organized a campaign to use geofencing to target specific colleges within Mississippi to serve 'get out the vote' ads in advance of the November election. Mississippi Votes estimated the ad campaign caused approximately 3,000 new voters to register.

In 2023, Bennett organized an effort to push back on proposed Mississippi bill HB 1020, describing the bill as an effort to move power to Republican state officials from the city of Jackson. Bennett said the bill was an "opportunity for [white] folks to control resources and for plantation politics to be at play in a real way". Bennett is an Electoral Justice Project fellow with the Movement For Black Lives.

== Awards and honors ==
- Medgar Evers award by the NAACP
- Fannie Lou Hamer award by the Southern Human Rights Organizers' Conference
