= Louis Bennett Field =

- IATA: none; ICAO: none; FAA LID: WV23

Summary
- Airport type: Private
- Owner: West Virginia University
- Location: Weston, West Virginia
- Elevation AMSL: 1,014 ft (309 m)
- Coordinates: 39°05′29″N 080°28′10″W
- Interactive map of Louis Bennett Field

Runways
Direction	Length		Surface
Direction	ft	m	Surface
1/19	3,195	974	Asphalt
- Source: Federal Aviation Administration

Louis Bennett Field (FAA LID: WV23, formerly 49I) is a private-use airport located 3 miles (5 km) north of the central business district of Weston, in Lewis County, West Virginia, United States. It is privately owned by West Virginia University.

The airport is named in honor of Weston native Louis Bennett Jr., a pilot with the Royal Flying Corps who was killed during World War I.

== Facilities ==
Louis Bennett Field covers an area of 80 acres (32 ha) at an elevation of 1,014 feet (309 m) above mean sea level. It has one asphalt paved runway designated 1/19 which measures 3,195 x 50 feet (974 x 15 m).
