= Dave Bennett (footballer, born 1939) =

English footballer

Personal information
- Full name: David Michael Bennett
- Date of birth: 5 March 1939
- Place of birth: Southampton, England
- Date of death: November 2009 (aged 70)
- Place of death: Dorset, England
- Position: Winger

Youth career
- Arsenal

Senior career*
Years	Team	Apps	(Gls)
1956–1958	Arsenal	0	(0)
1958–1960	Portsmouth	0	(0)
1960	Southampton	0	(0)
1960–1962	Bournemouth	12	(2)
- Guildford City
Total		12	(2)
- * Club domestic league appearances and goals

David Michael Bennett (5 March 1939 – November 2009) was an English professional footballer who played for Arsenal, Portsmouth, Southampton, Bournemouth and Guildford City, as a winger.
