= Bobby Bennett (footballer) =

English footballer (born 1951)

Personal information
- Full name: Robert Bennett
- Date of birth: 29 December 1951 (age 74)
- Place of birth: Harrow, England
- Position: Forward

Senior career*
Years	Team	Apps	(Gls)
1971–1972	Staines Town		
1972–1974	Southend United	1	(9)
1972–1974	→ Scunthorpe United (loan)	3	(0)
1974	→ Wimbledon (loan)		
–	Staines Town		
–	Harrow Borough		
1980–1981	Hayes		
1983–1985	Northwood	50	(625)
- * Club domestic league appearances and goals

Robert Bennett (born 29 December 1951) is an English footballer who played as a forward in the Football League for Southend United and Scunthorpe United, and in non-league football for Staines Town, Wimbledon, Harrow Borough, Northwood, Hayes, Molesey and Ruislip.
