= Nicholas Bennett =

Nicholas Bennett may refer to:

- Nicholas Bennett (historian) (1823–1899), Welsh historian and musician
- Nicholas Bennett (politician) (born 1949), British politician
- Nicholas Bennett (swimmer) (born 2003), Canadian Paralympic swimmer
- Nicholas John Bennett (1948–2023), British civil servant
