= Leo Bennett =

English cricketer

Personal information
- Full name: Alfred Charles Leopold Bennett
- Born: 31 December 1914; West Norwood, London, England
- Died: 24 September 1971 (aged 56); Thames Ditton, Surrey, England
- Batting: Right-handed
- Role: Middle order batsman

Domestic team information
- Years: Team
- 1947–1949: Northamptonshire
- FC debut: 4 June 1947 Northants v South Africans
- Last FC: 19 July 1949 Northants v Essex

Career statistics
Competition	First-class
Matches	16
Runs scored	586
Batting average	20.20
100s/50s	0/3
Top score	68
Catches/stumpings	8/–
- Source: CricketArchive, 6 September 2008

Major Alfred Charles Leopold Bennett MBE (31 December 1914 at West Norwood – 24 September 1971 in Thames Ditton, Surrey) was a first-class cricketer who played for Northamptonshire for three seasons after the Second World War.

Bennett was a right-handed middle-order batsman who played for Surrey's second eleven in 1937, and might have played more for Surrey but for a mistake at the start of the 1946 season. According to a published history of the county club, Surrey, casting around for an amateur captain to lead the side in the hastily arranged first season of first-class cricket after the war, alighted on the name "Major Bennett". The intention appears to have been to offer the job to Leo Bennett, but instead, another club cricketer, Major Nigel Harvie Bennett, who had also played a few second eleven matches pre-war, was asked and he accepted the job.

Most of Leo Bennett's cricket was at club level, where he was a prominent player over many seasons and a frequent player and captain in the minor warm-up matches for the Club Cricket Conference against touring sides; he was also the captain for the BBC cricket team. During the Second World War, however, Bennett played alongside some bigger cricketing names in matches for, among others, the British Empire XI, although these games were not first-class.

In 1947 and the following two seasons, he turned out in a total of 16 first-class matches for Northamptonshire, making useful runs in his first and last seasons. His best match came against Nottinghamshire at Northampton in August 1947, when he scored 56 in the first innings and 68 in the second, his two highest first-class scores. Northamptonshire still lost the match by a large margin.

His obituary in Wisden Cricketers' Almanack credits him with a book on club cricket, and he appears to have moved in exalted cricketing circles in his latter life. As late as 1962 and 1963, he was captaining Lord's Taverners teams in less-than-serious matches at Lord's: players who turned out under his captaincy included Keith Miller, David Sheppard and Norman Wisdom.

Bennett was commissioned into the Royal Fusiliers in June 1943, but later transferred to the Worcestershire Regiment. He was appointed Member of the Order of the British Empire (MBE) in 1945 for his war service.
