= Henry Bennett (cricketer) =

English cricketer

Henry Simpson Bennett (3 September 1869 – 18 February 1965) was an English cricketer who was active in 1894. He was born in Pilsley, North East Derbyshire and died in Hyde, Cheshire. He made his first-class debut in 1894 and appeared in one match as an unknown handedness batsman who kept wicket, playing for Lancashire. He scored sixteen runs with a highest score of 11 and held four catches.
