= D. Scott Bennett =

American political scientist

D. Scott Bennett (born June 24, 1966) is an American political scientist and Distinguished Professor of Political Science at the Pennsylvania State University. He is also Senior Associate Dean for Research and Graduate Studies. Bennett is known for his works on international conflict.
