= Paul Bennett =

Paul Bennett may refer to:

- Paul Bennett (Canadian football) (born 1954), Canadian football player
- Paul Bennett (footballer, born 1952), English footballer
- Paul Bennett (footballer, born 1961), English footballer
- Paul Bennett (rower) (born 1988), British Olympic gold medal-winning rower
- Paul Bennett (Royal Navy officer) (born 1964), British admiral
- Paul Bennett (typographer) (1897–1966), American author and typographer
- Paul Bennett, pseudonym of Paul Begaud in the early 1990s, Australian singer, songwriter, and record producer
- Paul Bennett (1945–2025), pen name of Angelo Todaro, Italian comic artist
- Rev. Paul Bennett, a vicar who was stabbed to death in the churchyard of St Fagan's Church (Trecynon, Wales) in 2007
- Paul Bennett, tennis player, see List of Canada Davis Cup team representatives
- Paul Bennett, a character in the television series Dexter
