= Alfred Gordon Bennett =

English novelist and poet

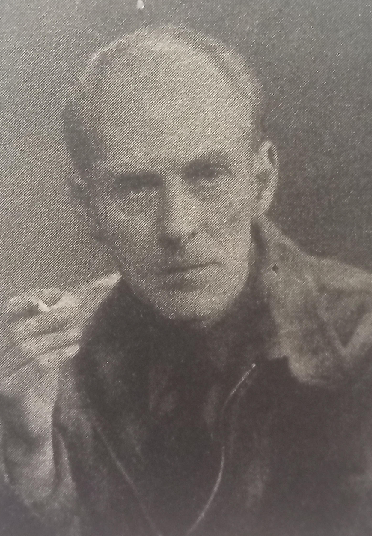
- Bennett in 1953
- Born: 11 December 1901; Warrington
- Died: 11 August 1962 (aged 60); Colwyn Bay
- Occupation: Novelist

Alfred Gordon Bennett (11 December 1901 – 11 August 1962) was an English novelist and poet.

== Biography ==
Bennett was born in Warrington. He was the only child of Alderman Arthur Bennett, Mayor of Warrington. Bennett was educated at Boteler Grammar School and The Leys School in Cambridge. His English teacher at Leys was W. H. Balgarnie. Bennett worked as a reporter for The Daily Post as a young man. He married Gwendoline Rita Evans-Williams of Anglesey. His wife was Group Commandant of the Women's Junior Air Corps. He travelled extensively throughout Canada, United States, Egypt, Greece, Turkey, France and Italy.

During World War II he was a flying officer for the Royal Air Force. Bennett was the founder of the Institute of Amateur Cinematographers. His collected poems were published in 1930. He published novels through his company Pharos Books. His science-fiction novel The Demigods told the story of a giant race of ants controlled from a vast subterranean formicarium led by a master brain which planned to destroy the human race. The book was published in 1939 and was republished in 1955. Bennett stated that he was the first author to tell a story of giant ants seeking to exterminate humanity and the first to attribute the cause of their giantism to the exposure of radiation. He also authored Whom the Gods Destroy, an oriental mystery novel with supernatural themes.

His book Focus on the Unknown (1953) speculates on astral projection, dreams, life after death, occultism and yoga. It was a semi-finalist for the Atlantic Non-Fiction Award 1952–1953. An updated edition was published in 1954.

== Death ==
Bennett died at Colwyn Bay hospital on 11 August 1962. He was cremated at Colwyn Bay Crematorium. Before his death, Bennett was working on Man and Cosmos, an unpublished treatise on philosophy and science.

== Selected publications ==
- The Forest of Fear (1924)
- The Sea of Sleep (1926)
- Cinemania: Aspects of Filmic Creation (1937)
- The Demigods (1939)
- Whom the Gods Destroy (1946)
- Focus on the Unknown (1953)
