= Mark Bennett =

Mark Bennett may refer to:

- Mark Bennett (rugby union, born 1969), Welsh rugby union footballer
- Mark Bennett (rugby union, born 1993), Scottish rugby union footballer
- Mark Bennett (snooker player) (born 1963), former professional snooker player
- Mark J. Bennett (born 1953), former Hawaii Attorney General, judge of the United States Court of Appeals for the Ninth Circuit (2018–)
- Mark W. Bennett (born 1950), judge of the United States District Court for the Northern District of Iowa
