= David Bennett (jeweler) =

British jeweler

David Bennett is a British auctioneer and jeweler. He is known as the “100-carat man” for his history of selling 100-carat diamonds with record-breaking prices. He served as the chief auctioneer and the chairman of Sotheby's international jewelry division. Bennett is also regarded as the founding father of the contemporary jewelry-auction market, having introduced innovations in jewelry auction.

== Biography ==
Bennett was born in March 1952. He completed a degree in philosophy and initially intended to start working in the film industry. According to Bennett, his father was against this plan so he introduced him to a friend, who was working as a director at Sotheby's. He joined Sotheby's graduate program in 1978. He began as a trainee cataloguer in the jewelry division, discovered that he excelled as a jeweler, and quickly rose through the company's ranks.

=== Career at Sotheby's ===
Part of his responsibilities as head of the jewelry division at Sotheby's was securing jewelry collections for auction. Bennett was behind the successful sale of collections by prominent figures such as the Duchess of Windsor, Maria Callas, and Ava Gardner. His auction in 2010 sold the "Graff Pink" diamond for $46.2 million, which was the highest price ever paid for a jewelry at that time.

In 2015, Bennett was promoted as chairman of Sotheby's international jewelry division. Under Bennett's watch, the Jewelry Division became the third-largest department for Sotheby's in terms of total sales. Its turnover zoomed past the $190 million turnover posted in 2009 to $602.5 million in 2015. A year later, Sotheby's jewelry sales amounted to $296 million and the bulk of these came from the Magnificent Jewels and Noble Jewels sale, which Bennett masterminded in Geneva. This auction raked in almost $170 million, eclipsing the previous record post by Sotheby's in the previous year. In 2018, Bennett also successfully presided over the sale of royal jewels from the Bourbon-Parma family, which sold jewels for $53.1 million and a natural pearl for $36.2 million, a new record for royal and antique jewels sold at auction.

Bennett stepped down as the chairman of Sotheby's worldwide jewelry division in 2020 after more than four decades working for the company. He was replaced by Gary Schuler, Sotheby's former jewelry chairman for the Americas.

=== Recognitions ===
In 2013, the magazine Art+Auction named Bennett as one of the top 10 most powerful people in the art world. A year later, he was cited by the Swiss financial business magazine Bilan as part of the 50 most influential people in Switzerland. Bennett co-authored with Daniela Mascetti, a fellow Sotheby's luminary, two books about jewelry, Celebrating Jewellery and Understanding Jewellery.
