= Frank Bennett =

Frank Bennett may refer to:

- Frank Bennett (actor) (1890–1957), American silent film actor
- Frank Bennett (American football) (1879–1936), college football player
- Frank Bennett (baseball) (1904–1966), American baseball pitcher
- Frank Bennett (ice hockey) (1923–1996), Canadian ice hockey player
- Frank Bennett (occultist) (1868–1930), Australian occultist
- Frank Bennett (politician) (1895–1946), Newfoundland politician
- Frank Bennett (scholar) (1866–1947), English academic and Anglican cleric
- Frank Bennett (singer) (born 1959), Australian singer
- Frank Moss Bennett (1874–1952), British painter
- Frank P. Bennett (1853–1933), American journalist, magazine publisher and politician
- Frank P. Bennett Jr. (1878–1965), American politician, banker and editor
- Frankie Bennett (born 1969), English footballer
- C. Frank Bennett, American pharmacologist

== See also ==
- Francis Bennett (disambiguation)
