= Edward Bennett (footballer, born 1897) =

English footballer

Personal information
- Full name: Edward Thomas Bennett
- Date of birth: 10 August 1897
- Place of birth: Barton Regis, England
- Date of death: 1957 (aged 59–60)
- Position: Full-back

Senior career*
Years	Team	Apps	(Gls)
1922–1923	Bristol City	0	(0)
1923–1925	Swansea Town	11	(0)
1925–1926	Wrexham	37	(0)
1926–1929	Manchester City	19	(0)
1929–1931	Norwich City	11	(0)
Total		78	(0)
- * Club domestic league appearances and goals

Edward Thomas Bennett (10 August 1897 – 1957) was an English footballer who played in the Football League for Manchester City, Norwich City, Swansea Town and Wrexham.
