= Ella May Bennett =

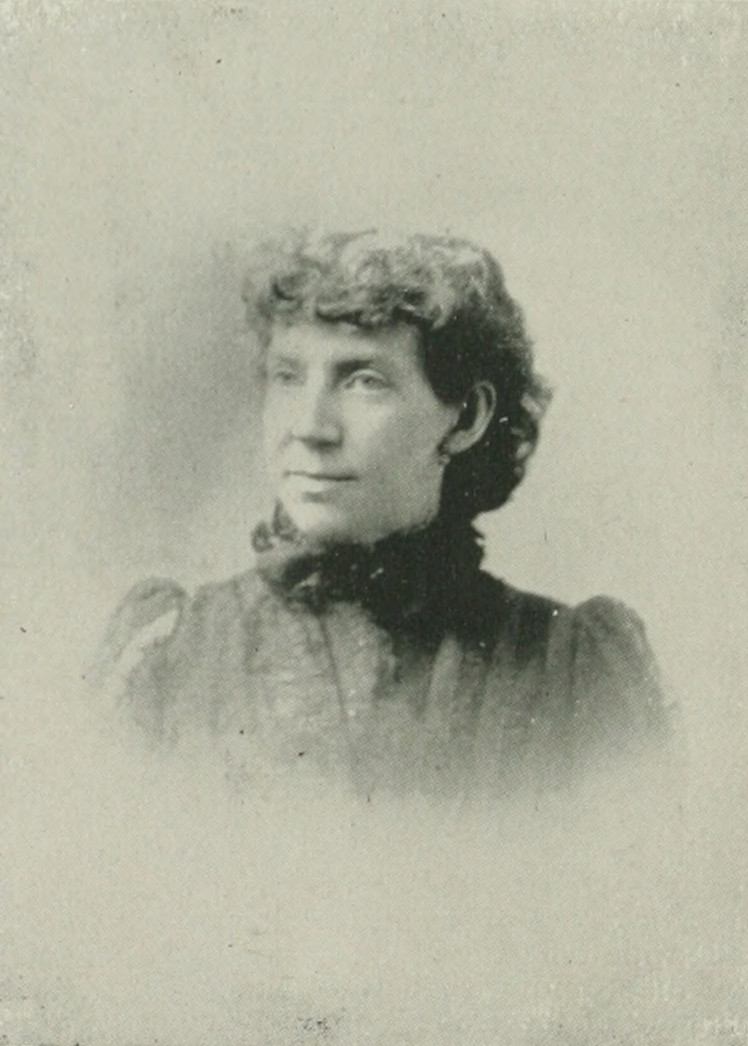
- Portrait photo from A Woman of the Century

Personal life
- Born: Ella May Hawkins; April 21, 1855 Stony Brook, New York, U.S.
- Died: 1932 (aged 76–77)
- Spouse: William Bennett (m. 1875)
- Known for: first woman to be ordained to the ministry on Long Island
- Relatives: Edward Hawkins & Simeon S. Hawkins (half-brothers)

Religious life
- Religion: Christianity
- Denomination: Universalist
- Profession: minister
- Ordination: September 25, 1890

Ella May Bennett (1855–1932) was an American Universalist minister. In 1890, she was the first woman to be ordained to the ministry on Long Island. Four years later, after exhibiting erratic behavior, she was declared insane and removed to the Hudson River Insane Asylum at Poughkeepsie, New York.

== Early life ==
Ella May Hawkins was born in Stony Brook, New York, April 21, 1855. Her mother's maiden name was Harriet Atwood Terry (1821–1902) and her father's name was Daniel Shaler Hawkins (1798–1868). Bennett was the twelfth child of a family of fourteen; nine half-siblings were from her father's first marriage, and four were from her parents' marriage. Senators Edward Hawkins and Simeon S. Hawkins were half-brothers. Two of Bennett's uncles, John Terry, a Methodist, and Wilson Terry, a Baptist, were ministers.

When a very small child, Bennett thought deeply upon religious matters. She would often ask her mother to go and pray, especially when her mother seemed troubled in any way. From the very first, God seemed to her a friend and comforter. When the doctrines of the church which she had attended were explained to her, she rejected them. When about 13 years of age, she visited a cousin in northern Pennsylvania, and for the first time listened to a sermon by a Universalist minister. She recognized her early ideas of God and heaven. On her return home, she was told the Bible gave no authority for such a doctrine. She accepted that statement, gave up all interest in religious matters, would not open the Bible, and tried to become an atheist. For years, she lived with mental health issues that at times threatened her power of reasoning.

== Career ==
Bennett published verses at the age of 11 years, and she spent a portion of her life in literary work.

For many years, Bennett's mother had been deeply concerned about her daughter's mental state. When Bennett was about 30 years of age, her mother presented her a Bible, begging her to read it. Bennett reluctantly promised to do so. After reading only a few pages when, to her surprise, she found authority for the Universalist faith. The Bible became her constant companion, and for months, she read nothing else.

Bennett became anxious for others to know the faith which had improved her own life. At the request of Edward Oaks, she consented to read sermons during afternoons in Stony Brook's Union Hall. The sermon reading gradually changed to original essays, and finally, Bennett found herself conducting regular and popular sermons. Rev. Lewis Beals Fisher, of Bridgeport, Connecticut, became interested in Bennett's work, and Bennett united with his church in May 1889. After preaching for some time in Union Hall, she developed such a talent for the ministry that many of her friends advised her to apply for a license to preach. Although her mother and brothers tried to persuade her against it, Bennett decided to pursue this. Fisher presented Bennett a library of books and assisted in procuring for her the license to preach.

On September 25, 1890, Bennett was ordained in Stony Brook. There was unusual interest in the event as Bennett was the first woman to be ordained to the ministry on Long Island. At the time, Bennett said that she did not expect to take any regular charge for the present, but would devote her time to Christian work at Stony Brook, Setauket, and Port Jefferson.

Bennett entered the ministry with the determination never to accept a good position and stated salary, but to labor where the faith was new and for the free-will offering of the people. Although tempted by large salaries, she never wavered in that determination. In 1891, she made an extended visit in Pennsylvania where she attended the Universalist convention of Pennsylvania.

== Personal life ==
In 1875, she married William Bennett, a sea captain, and they had three children.

In September 1894, she appeared on the streets singing and shouting. The following day, she ran away from her watchers and darted down the street. She ran into a large tree, and was felled by the blow and became unconscious. Within days, she raved all night, and begged her attendants to tie her down so that she would not harm anyone. She became violent some time afterward, and knocked down her mother and her child by blows from her fist. She told them that they had been ordered to die. During a storm early in the evening, she ran from the house, clad only in her robe and barefooted, and rushed down Main street in the pouring rain. Friends met her and tried to induce her to return, but she refused, and did not even recognize them. She wandered about for an hour. Dr. Bates said that he thought she was beyond mental recovery and would have to be placed in an asylum. Initially, Mr. Bennett did not want to commit to this. He hoped that the trouble was only temporary, believing if his wife could get some rest, her mind would return to its normal state. On September 17, 1894, considered to be hopelessly insane, Bennett was removed to the Hudson River Insane Asylum (renamed Hudson River State Hospital) at Poughkeepsie, New York; her husband and brothers accompanied her.
