= Nigel Harvie Bennett =

English cricketer (1913–2008)

Nigel Bennett

Personal information
- Full name: Nigel Harvie Bennett
- Born: 23 September 1912; Walton-on-Thames, Surrey, England
- Died: 26 July 2008 (aged 95); Bristol, England
- Batting: Right-handed
- Role: Middle order batsman

Domestic team information
- Years: Team
- 1946: Surrey
- First-class debut: 4 May 1946 Surrey v MCC
- Last First-class: 5 September 1946 Surrey v Combined Services

Career statistics
Competition	First-class
Matches	31
Runs scored	688
Batting average	16.00
100s/50s	0/4
Top score	79
Balls bowled	37
Wickets	1
Bowling average	25.00
5 wickets in innings	0
10 wickets in match	0
Best bowling	1/1
Catches/stumpings	6/–
- Source: CricketArchive, 6 September 2008

Major Nigel Harvie Bennett (23 September 1912 – 26 July 2008) was an English cricketer.

Bennett was unexpectedly appointed as the county captain of Surrey County Cricket Club in 1946 when the club was still recovering from the Second World War. It is generally believed he was mistaken for the prominent club cricketer and BBC captain, Major Leo Bennett, who was mooted as a likely choice. Leo Bennett later played for Northamptonshire.

Nigel Bennett had played three matches for Surrey Second Eleven in 1936, twice against Kent Second Eleven and once against Wiltshire. He played in 31 first-class matches for Surrey as a right-handed batsman, scoring 688 runs at an average of 16.00 with a highest score of 79. He scored four half-centuries and took six catches. E. M. Wellings said Bennett was "a weak batsman and utterly lost as a county captain", and Surrey slumped to 11th, their worst ever finish. E. H. D. Sewell, on the contrary, said Bennett was an excellent captain and the county's weak bowling was to blame for the poor performance. Bennett was replaced by Errol Holmes, who was recalled as captain for the 1947 and 1948 seasons.

Bennett was born at Walton-on-Thames, Surrey and died in Bristol at the age of 95.
