= Kyle Bennett =

Kyle Bennett may refer to:

- Kyle Bennett (BMX rider) (1979–2012), American professional BMX racer
- Kyle Bennett (footballer) (born 1990), English footballer
- Kyle Bennett (Home and Away), or Kyle Braxton, a fictional character on the Australian soap opera Home and Away
