= Wayne Bennett =

Wayne Bennett may refer to:

- Wayne Bennett (blues guitarist) (1931–1992), American blues guitarist
- Wayne Bennett (rugby league) (born 1950), Australian rugby league football coach and former player
- Wayne D. Bennett (1927–2015), American politician
- Wayne "Lotek" Bennett (born 1977), English songwriter
