= Alex Bennett =

Alex or Alexander Bennett may refer to:

- Alex Bennett (broadcaster) (born 1939), American talk radio host
- Alex Bennett (footballer) (1881–1940), Scottish footballer
- Alex Bennett (Home and Away), fictional character in the Australian soap opera Home and Away
- Alex Bennett (swimmer) (born 1977), English swimmer
- Alexander Bennett (dancer) (1929–2003), British ballet dancer and choreographer
- Alex Bennett (actor) in Zanna, Don't!
- Alex Bennett (sailor); see Transat Jacques Vabre
