= Robin Crompton =

Robin Huw Crompton (born December 1951) is professor of musculoskeletal biology at the University of Liverpool in the Institute of Ageing and Chronic Disease. He has developed the Fossil Footprint Archive jointly with Matthew Bennett of Bournemouth University. He has criticized the March of Progress image for implying that the common ancestor taxon of all great apes wouldn't have been bipedal, when fossil evidence suggests it would have been.
