= Colin Bennett (film critic) =

Australian film critic (1929–2022)

John Colin Monash Bennett (22 August 1929 – 23 February 2022) was an Australian film critic, best known for his long tenure at The Age newspaper. He was a critic at The Age from 1955 until 1980 and was thus very influential in cinema culture of Melbourne. Bennett played a key role in the Melbourne International Film Festival and Australian Film Institute.

== Early life and education ==
Colin Bennett was born on 22 August 1929 at 'lona', St George's Road, Toorak, the residence of his grandfather, Sir John Monash. Bennett attended Scotch College, Hawthorn, Victoria from 1934. In 1947, his last year of school, he was a prefect, editor of the school magazine The Collegian, and rowed in the winning 1947 2nd eight. He studied violin and piano, but music teacher John Bishop persuaded him that his second love, writing, was more suitable.

After studying at Melbourne University, he became a cadet reporter at The Age in 1950 and married June Reeve Liebert on 25 January 1952 before leaving for Britain. Colin worked in factories and as a postman, and then as a reporter, photographer and a film, theatre and opera critic for a chain of London weeklies.

== Career ==
Returning to Melbourne in 1955, Colin became The Age's film critic for a record quarter of a century. Fighting for an Australian film revival, Colin was a founding governor of the Australian Film Institute in 1958 and remained on the board until 1974. He co-founded the AFI Awards, helping to judge them for 18 years. He drafted guidelines for Australia's first experimental film fund and was one of its original assessors.

As a journalist, Colin spearheaded a 1960s anti-censorship campaign, during an era of harsh cutting and banning of films in Australia, resulting in a great liberalisation and the introduction of an R certificate. As a critic for the ABC, he regularly spoke on radio and television and presented annual ABC TV programs on the AFI Awards and the Melbourne Film Festival.

== Philosophy ==
Bennett wrote about his career:

Having tried most jobs in journalism, from the police rounds to the stock exchange, I soon found that film criticism (the Age demanded far more from its critics than superficial ‘reviewing’) was the easiest of all to do badly and by far the hardest to do well. I struggled always to convey the experience of seeing a film, the feel of it; to get to the kernel or nub of it, as well as imparting information about it. I suppose I was saying in effect: ‘Here is what I think the film is like; what it is; its essence. Now go and see it -- if it is likely to interest you. And maybe there is something here that will give you greater insight into it . . . .’

== Australian films ==
Bennett was critical of some Australian films throughout his career. He called Dust in the Sun "barely competent technically and dreadfully leaden in its pace" and said "as the only feature film Australia can show in years, it will not do."

Bennett took part in a famous feud with Tim Burstall where he criticised Burstall's debut feature Two Thousand Weeks. Fellow critic David Stratton wrote Bennett's "attitude was unbearably righteous and helped create a climate in which a good film could be destroyed."

Bennett wrote that Wake in Fright was "the strongest and most savage comment on Australia ever put in film" but felt it "had no finesse, few nuancies or subtleties."

Bennett called the film Don's Party "very funny" but felt "there was nothing very much at its centre" in which the characters "emerge largely as types." He admired the "professionalism" of The Chant of Jimmie Blacksmith but qualified, "one is still left questioning this particular story's relevance today, apart from the spreading of guilt and self loathing amongst its white audiences."

== Appraisal ==
Geoff Gardner, a previous Melbourne Film Festival director, said in his blog Film Alert 101:

Colin was much more sympathetic to the left-wing humanism of Sight & Sound with its focus on Brit and other realists, Bergman, Bunuel, the daring Poles like Wajda and other dissenting voices from Eastern Europe, the famous Russians like Eisenstein.

But from those times in the 60s through to 1980, you never stopped reading him and never stopped being impressed by the fervour with which he espoused the causes of Australian film-making, the ending of the Menzian nanny state where idiot Liberal Ministers used to make fools of themselves banning books and films at the direction of the Chief Censor the fabulously nicknamed One-Armed Dick Prowse. (One Ministerial dope even got up in the Parliament and lamented how he had make a decision to ban the Kama Sutra and "it had placed him in a very difficult position").

Colin covered it all, provoked arguments, advanced causes, remained supremely affable, sucked on that pipe of his and was never deterred.

Fellow critic David Stratton called Bennett "inflexible in his standards and makes few allowances for the specific problems of Australian film making". Anthony Ginnane called him "very much a proponent of the Sight and Sound school of English criticism which pre-dated Movie and the auteur theory". David Williamson wrote that Bennett "dislikes intensely anything vulgar, escapist, ocker or entertaining, and wishes he hadn’t been born in Australia, hoping that we'll all transform ourselves as rapidly as possible into small-'l' liberals like himself so that he can cease being ashamed of his origins... There is such a strong correlation between a good Colin Bennett crit and disaster at the box-office that certain Australian film producers get very nervous if he views their product favourably."

== Personal life ==
Colin left journalism in 1980 to enjoy country life, running a horse-riding school with his second wife and taking trail rides and camps. More recently he was a successful portrait painter in oils and pastels.
