= Harry Bennett (cricketer) =

Australian cricketer

Personal information
- Full name: Harry Francis Bennett
- Born: 22 June 1859; South Yarra, Melbourne, Colony of Victoria
- Died: 4 October 1898 (aged 39); Guildford, Western Australia
- Batting: Right-handed
- Role: Wicket-keeper

Domestic team information
- Years: Team
- 1892/93: Western Australia

Career statistics
Competition	First-class
Matches	2
Runs scored	13
Batting average	3.25
100s/50s	0/0
Top score	10
Catches/stumpings	1/0
- Source: Cricinfo, 28 July 2013

Harry Bennett (22 June 1859 – 4 October 1898) was an Australian cricketer. He played for Western Australia during 1892 and 1893.
