= Roger Bennett =

Roger Bennett may refer to:

- Roger Bennett (journalist) (born 1970), sports journalist, writer and radio personality
- Roger Bennett (playwright) (1948–1997), Australian playwright best known for Up the Ladder and Funerals and Circuses
