= Eric Bennett =

Eric or Erik Bennett may refer to:

- Eric Bennett (archer) (born 1973), American Paralympic archer
- Erik Bennett (baseball) (born 1968), American baseball player
- Erik Bennett (Royal Air Force officer) (1928–2022), Sultan of Oman's Air Force air marshal
- Eric Bennett (rugby league) (1915–1998), Australian rugby league player
