= Louis Bennett Jr. =

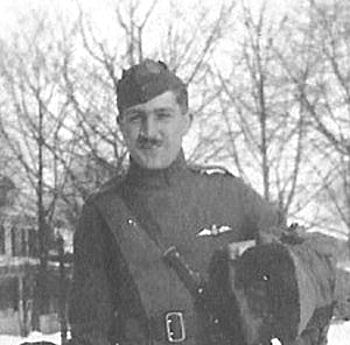
- Louis Bennett Jr., 1918
- Born: September 22, 1894; Weston, West Virginia
- Died: August 24, 1918 (aged 23); Near Marquillies, France
- Burial place: Machpelah Cemetery, Weston, West Virginia
- Military career
- Allegiance: United States
- Branch: Royal Air Force (United Kingdom)
- Unit: Royal Air Force: No. 40 Squadron RAF
- Conflicts: World War I

Louis Bennett Jr. (22 September 1894 – 24 August 1918) was an American pursuit pilot and a flying ace in World War I.

He died near Marquillies, France in combat on 24 August 1918.

== Biography ==
Born in Weston, West Virginia, he was the son of Louis Bennett Sr. and Sallie Maxwell Bennett. Louis Bennett's father, a prominent Lewis County politician, was the Democratic nominee for governor of West Virginia in 1908. Louis Bennett Jr. attended Cutler and St. Luke's preparatory schools in Pennsylvania before enrolling at Yale in 1913.

In October 1917 he went to Canada and joined the Royal Flying Corps at Toronto, Ontario. After training, he was deployed to France where he was assigned to No. 40 Squadron RAF. Like fellow American Frank Luke, Bennett was fond of shooting down balloons. During his brief but remarkable nine-day career, Bennett flew 25 sorties against the Germans, shooting down nine enemy balloons from an S.E.5a. On 24 August 1918, after destroying his last two balloons, his aircraft burst into flames when it was hit by ground fire. Bennett crashed but was pulled from his plane shortly before he died from his injuries. Bennett received no medals for his actions in combat, but Weston's airport was later named Louis Bennett Field in his honor.

== See also ==
- List of World War I flying aces from the United States
