= Lee Ann Bennett =

U.S. Air Force general

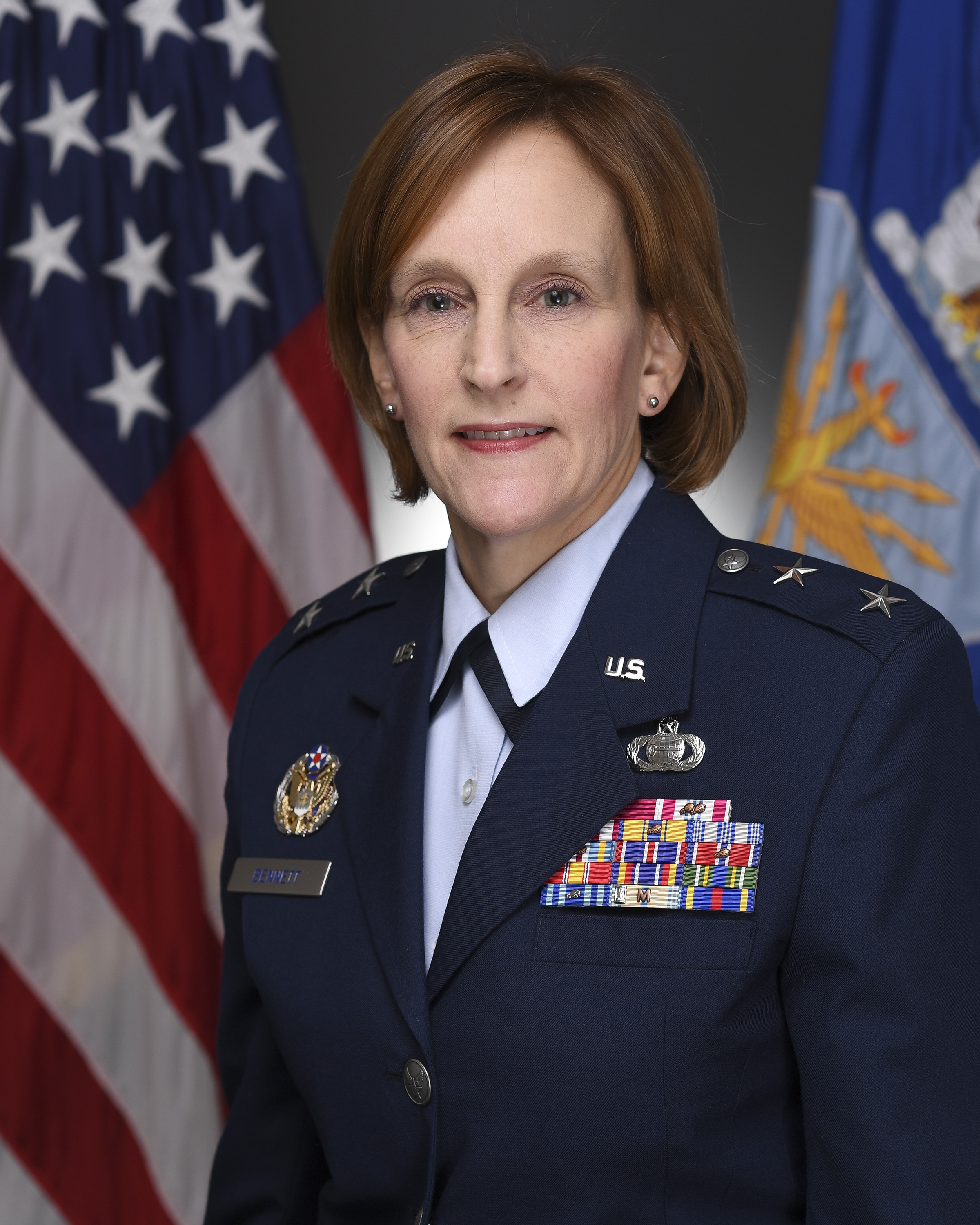
- Official portrait, 2019
- Military career
- Allegiance: United States
- Branch: United States Air Force
- Service years: 1988–2023
- Rank: Major General
- Awards: Legion of Merit

Lee Ann T. Bennett is a retired United States Air Force major general who last served as the mobilization assistant to the Deputy Chief of Staff for Intelligence, Surveillance, Reconnaissance, and Cyber Effects Operations of the United States Air Force from October 2019 to March 2023. Previously, she was the mobilization assistant to the Deputy Chief of Staff, Intelligence, Surveillance and Reconnaissance.

Military offices
Preceded by ???	Mobilization Assistant to the Commander of the Twenty-Fifth Air Force; 2014–2016	Succeeded by Lynnette J. Hebert
Preceded by ???	Mobilization Assistant to the Director of Intelligence of Air Combat Command; 2016–2017	Succeeded by Jeffrey F. Hill
