= Alan Bennett (tenor) =

American opera singer

Alan Bennett (born 1962) is an American lyric tenor known mostly for his performances in concert and oratorio work. He is particularly admired for his interpretations of the works of Bach, George Frideric Handel, and Mozart.

== Career ==
Bennett attended the University of North Carolina at Greensboro where he studied vocal performance. He graduated with a bachelor's degree in 1984 and a master's degree in 1987. He studied voice with Charles Lynam, Paul Elliott, and the late Norman Farrow.

He has performed extensively throughout the United States, Canada, Europe and South America, singing at many prominent festivals and with many of the world's leading orchestras. He has sung with the Cleveland Orchestra, Seattle Symphony, Kansas City Symphony, the Philharmonia Baroque Orchestra, the Atlanta Symphony, Omaha Symphony Orchestra, Colorado Symphony Orchestra, Calgary Philharmonic, St. Paul Chamber Orchestra, Los Angeles Chamber Orchestra, Indianapolis Chamber Orchestra, the Handel and Haydn Society, Tafelmusik, and Les Violons du Roy among many others.

His music festival appearances include the Tanglewood Festival, Oregon Bach Festival, Bethlehem Bach Festival, Baldwin-Wallace Bach Festival, Bay Chamber Festival, Plymouth Music Festival, Le Rendez-vou Musicale de Laterriere in Quebec and the Grand Teton Music Festival among others. He was also a regular performer at the Carmel Bach Festival for many years. He has sung for the Houston Masterworks Chorus, Oratorio Society of New York, Choral Arts Society of Washington, Baltimore Choral Arts Society, Dartmouth Handel Society, Seattle Chamber Singers and the Bloomington Chamber Singers. He has worked under some of the world's most prominent Baroque music conductors including Christopher Hogwood, Bruno Weil, Helmuth Rilling, Nicholas McGegan, Bernard Labadie and the late Robert Shaw.

Although Bennett has focused mostly on the concert repertoire, he is not a stranger to the operatic stage. He has appeared in opera productions in the United States and Europe, mostly in baroque operas. His roles include the title role in Henry Purcell's King Arthur and Jupiter in Handel's Semele among others.

As a recitalist, Bennett is particularly admired for his interpretations of German lieder, which he has recorded with pianist Leonard Hokanson.

He currently serves as Head of Vocal Studies at the Yong Siew Toh Conservatory of Music of the National University of Singapore. Prior to moving to Singapore, he was an associate professor of music at Indiana University Jacobs School of Music in Bloomington, Indiana.
