= Don Bennett (baseball) =

- Pinch hitter
- Born: Unknown; Unknown
- Died: Unknown; Unknown
- Batted: Unknown Threw: Unknown

Negro league baseball debut
- 1930, for the Birmingham Black Barons

Last appearance
- 1930, for the Birmingham Black Barons

Negro National League I statistics
- Batting average: 1.000
- Home runs: 0
- Runs batted in: 1

Teams
- Birmingham Black Barons (1930)

Don Bennett (birth date unknown – death date unknown) was an American professional baseball player in the Negro leagues. He played with the Birmingham Black Barons in 1930, appearing as a pinch hitter and recording an RBI-triple in his only plate appearance. Nothing is known about Bennett aside from his name and statistics.
