= Sam Bennett =

Sam Bennett may refer to:

- Sam Bennett (footballer) (1879-1926), English footballer, List of Bury F.C. players (1–24 appearances)
- Sam Bennett (baseball) (1884–1969), Negro league baseball player
- Sam Bennett (cyclist) (born 1990), Irish cyclist
- Sam Bennett (ice hockey) (born 1996), Canadian ice hockey player
- Sam Bennett (golfer) (born 1999), American golfer
- Sam Bennett (Pennsylvania politician), American politician from Pennsylvania
- Sam Bennett (Passions), a character on the American soap opera Passions
- Sam Bennett (Private Practice), a character on the TV series Private Practice
- Samuel Bennett (1815–1878), journalist and newspaper owner in colonial Australia
- Sam Bennett (hurdler) (born 2001), British athlete
