= Andrew Bennett =

Andrew Bennett may refer to:

- Andrew Percy Bennett (1866–1943), British diplomat, envoy to Panama, 1920–1923, and Venezuela, 1923–1925
- Andrew Carl Bennett (1889–1971), US Navy admiral
- Andrew Bennett (politician) (1939–2024), British Labour Party politician
- Andy Bennett (born 1955), Australian rules footballer
- Andrew Bennett (actor), Irish actor
- Andrew Bennett (academic) (born 1972), Canadian academic and the first ambassador of the Canadian Office of Religious Freedom
- Drew Bennett (born 1978), American football wide receiver
- Andy Bennett (musician) (born 1985), English singer and musician
- Andrew Bennett (comics), fictional character in the comic series I…Vampire
