= Roy Bennett =

Roy Bennett may refer to:

- Roy Bennett (gridiron football) (born 1961), American and Canadian football defensive back
- Roy Bennett (politician) (1957–2018), Zimbabwean politician
- Roy Anthony Cutaran Bennett (1913–1990), Filipino journalist tortured by Japanese occupiers of Manila during World War II
- Roy C. Bennett (1918–2015), American songwriter
