= Amelia Bennett =

American artist (1914–2002)

- Born: 1914; Hazel, Alabama, U.S.
- Died: 2002 (aged 87–88)
- Citizenship: American
- Occupation: Artist

Amelia Bennett (1914–2002) was an American artist. She is associated with the Gee's Bend quilting collective. Her work has been exhibited at the Museum of Fine Arts, Houston and is included in the collection of the Dallas Museum of Art.

== Early life ==
Bennett was born and raised in Wilcox Corner, an area of Hazel, Alabama, by her parents Fannie T. Westbrook and Alex Westbrook. She began quilting under her mother's tutelage at the age of 11. She met her husband, Willie Earl Bennett, in 1935 and they married two months later. Together they raised three children, including one quilter, Sally Bennett Jones.
