= Ned Bennett =

Australian rules footballer

Personal information
- Full name: Edward Charles Bennett
- Born: 19 July 1876; Ballarat, Victoria
- Died: 19 January 1963 (aged 86); Wodonga, Victoria
- Original team: Montague Juniors

Playing career^{1}
Years	Club	Games (Goals)
1900	Carlton	6 (0)
- ^{1} Playing statistics correct to the end of 1900.

Edward Charles Bennett (19 July 1876 – 19 January 1963) was an Australian rules footballer who played with Carlton in the Victorian Football League (VFL).
