= Josie Bennett =

American rodeo official (1903–1985)

Josie Bennett (July 10, 1903 – October 4, 1985) was inducted into the ProRodeo Hall of Fame in the inaugural class of 1979.

== Life ==
Josie Bennett was born Josie Marie McEuen on July 10, 1903, in Enden, Arizona, in Graham County, Arizona. Bennett was the daughter of an Arizona pioneer and cattle rancher, Ed McEuen. She grew up at Fort Thomas, Arizona. Fort Thomas was once a cavalry post near the San Carlos Apache Indian Reservation. Bennett was a teacher in the Arizona area until she married. She had a sister named Lois who married Everett Bowman. Bowman was a founder of the Cowboy Turtles' Association (CTA). He was also the president of the association for a few years. She was married the second time to fellow inaugural hall of fame inductee Hugh Bennett on December 24, 1930.

== Career ==
Hugh was the (CTA)'s first secretary/treasurer. He was a world champion steer wrestler and tie-down roper. In 1945, the CTA was renamed the Professional Rodeo Cowboys Association. The CTA was struggling in the late 1930s. She used Hugh's position to contribute by doing the bookkeeping and correspondence for the CTA. Until 1942, she was responsible for all of the recordkeeping. She typed out most of the correspondence on a portable Royal typewriter. They used the trunk of their car for an office. However, all the work was pristine. In 1942, the CTA hired a salaried employee to fill the position. They hired Fannye Jones (who became Fannye Lovelady later), and she became the secretary-treasurer. Jones started out working in her home in Phoenix, Arizona.

Lewis Bowman was Hugh's brother-in-law. Their wives, Lois and Josie, worked together in their unofficial roles as secretary-treasurer through Hugh's official role. Bowman recalled that:

"men signed the cowboys up and kicked 'em straight (sometimes literally!). The sisters kept the books and the money in the back seat of their car and did the office work. "The ladies, Lois and Josie, actually did keep those records in suitcases in their car, and they worked without pay until 1942 when Fannye Jones Lovelady took over all the duties the sisters had been performing."

== Death ==
Bennett preceded her husband Hugh in death. She died on October 4, 1985, in Colorado Springs, Colorado.
