= Darren Bennett =

Darren Bennett may refer to:

- Darren Bennett (football player) (born 1965), former Australian rules football player and American football punter in the NFL
- Darren Bennett (dancer) (born 1977), professional Latin ballroom dancer
