= Matthew Bennett (geographer) =

British geographer

Matthew Bennett is professor of environmental and geographical sciences at Bournemouth University. He is a specialist in ancient footprints and has developed the Fossil Footprint Archive jointly with Robin Crompton of the University of Liverpool.

== Selected publications ==
- Doyle, P., Bennett, M.R. and Baxter, A.N., 1994. The key to earth history (first edition). John Wiley & Sons Inc.
- Bennett, M.M. and Glasser, N.F., 1996. Glacial Geology (first edition). Wiley.
- Bennett, M.R., 1996. The Quaternary of the Caimgorms: Field Guide. Quaternary Research Association, Cambridge.
- Bennett, M.R., 1996. Geology on Your Doorstep. Geological Society Publishing House.
- Bennett, M.R. and Doyle, P., 1997. Environmental geology. Wiley.
- Bennett, M.R. and Doyle, P., 1998. Issues in Environmental Geology. Geological Society Publishing House.
- Doyle, P. and Bennett, M.R., 1998. Unlocking the stratigraphical record. John Wiley & Son Ltd.
- Doyle, P., Bennett, M.R. and Baxter, A.N., 2001. The key to earth history. John Wiley & Sons Inc.
- Fields of Battle: Terrain in Military History. London: Kluwer Academic.
- Bennett, M.R., 2007. Geology of Snowdonia. Marlborough, Wiltshire: The Crowood Press Ltd.
- Bennett, M.R. and Glasser, N.F., 2009. Glacial Geology: Ice Sheets & Landforms. Chichester, England: Wiley-Blackwell.
- Bennett, M.R. and Morse, S.A., 2014. Human footprints: Fossilised locomotion?
