= Keith Bennett =

Keith Bennett may refer to:

- Keith Bennett (basketball) (born 1961), American-Israeli basketball player
- Keith Bennett (Canadian football) (1931–1995), Canadian football player
- Keith Bennett, victim in the Moors murders
