= Emerson Bennett =

American novelist

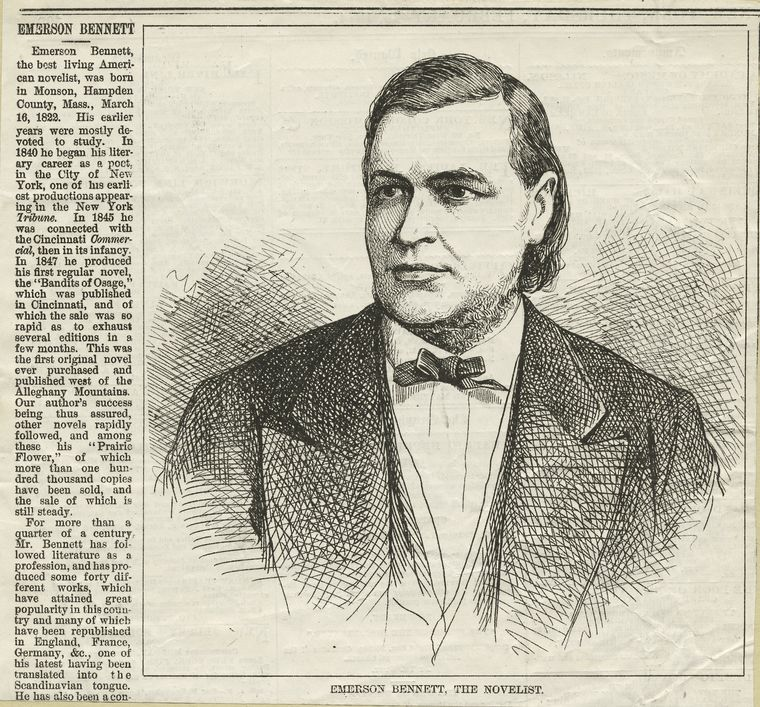
Emerson Bennett, novelist

Emerson Bennett (March 16, 1822 – May 11, 1905) was an American writer primarily known for his lively romantic adventure tales depicting American frontier life. He was the writer of over 30 novels and hundreds of short stories.

At one time, Bennett was one of the most popular authors in America. Several of his books reportedly sold over 100,000 copies. Bennett's work frequently appeared in The Saturday Evening Post, The New York Ledger and other periodicals. Some of his writings were translated into other languages. Bennett also wrote poetry and edited several periodicals. However these other literary endeavors never met with the commercial success of his prose fiction. Bennett wrote light, sensational and heroic adventure tales which many readers found engaging. His work sometimes first appeared in serialized form in newspapers and periodicals, which were subsequently reissued in book form.

Despite selling well at times, Bennett's fiction is generally regarded as substantially lacking in literary merit. He is more remembered as one of the leading novelists of the “yaller kivers” period of mid-nineteenth century American fiction, (so called for the “yellow covers” on the cheap sensational novels sold in railway stations and by newsboys during that era.) His books have also been called "dime novels". Bennett's popularity declined significantly during his later life.

Bennett was born in Monson, Massachusetts on May 16, 1822 and attended local schools and Monson Academy. At 17, he left home with the intention of becoming a writer. Little is known about this period of Bennett's life. It is known that after leaving home he moved initially to New York City, and then later to Philadelphia, Baltimore and Pittsburgh, eventually relocating to Cincinnati in 1844. During this period he lived frugally and supported himself in several sales jobs. Unable to gain steady employment as a writer, he took work going on the road throughout Ohio selling subscriptions for the Western Literary Journal. Returning from one of these sales trips, Bennett learned that a story he had written while in Philadelphia had been published. On the strength of this first successful story, Bennett was able to obtain a commission to write a serialized story for the Western Literary Journal. Many more publications of Bennett's work followed. Bennett also edited several periodical publications during his career. In 1847 Bennett married Eliza G. Daly. In 1850, he returned to Philadelphia, where he eventually retired. He spent the last few years of his life as a resident of the Masonic Home in that city, until his death in 1905 at the age of 82.

Although not altogether without artistic merit, Bennett's fiction has been characterized as derivative and formulaic, lacking originality. His work was also at times overtly racist or antisemitic. Today Bennett is remembered primarily as a figure of historical interest for the depictions he rendered of life on the American frontier. Bennett at times incorporated actual historical persons and events into his fictionalized stories. Bennett himself is considered a noteworthy figure in the early history of American popular fiction.

== Personal life ==
In 1847, Bennett married Eliza G. Daly in Philadelphia.

== Selected works ==
- The Pioneer's Daughter: And The Unknown Countess. T. B. Peterson & Brothers. 1851.
- Viola; Or, Adventures in the Far South-west. T.B. Peterson. 1852.
- Viola oder Abenteuer im fernen Südwesten von Emerson Bennett: Aus dem Englischen übersetzt. Christian Ernst Kollmann. 1856.
- Rosalie Du Pont or, Treason in the Camp: A Story of the Revolution. U. P. James. 1853.
- The Forged Will, Or, Crime and Retribution. T.B. Peterson. 1853.
- Ella Barnwell: A Historical Romance of Border Life. U. P. James. 1853. ISBN 9781421949840.
- Mike Fink: A Legend of the Ohio. J.A. & U.P. James. 1853.
- The bride of the wilderness. T.B. Peterson and Bros. 1854.
- Kate Clarendon: Or, Necromancy in the Wilderness. T. B. Peterson. 1854.
- The Heiress of Bellefont ... T.B. Peterson. 1855.
- The Border Rover. T.B. Peterson. 1857.
- Die Waldesbraut von Emerson Bennett: Aus dem Englischen. Christian Ernst Kollmann. 1857.
- Die Testamentsfälschung, oder: Sünde und Vergeltung: Von Emerson Bennett. Aus dem Englischen übersetzt. Ch. E. Kollmann. 1858.
- The Artist's Bride, Or, The Pawnbroker's Heir. Dick & Fitzgerald. 1859.
- The League of the Miami. U.P. James. 1860.
- The Phantom of the Forest: A Tale of the Dark and Bloody Ground. John E. Potter. 1868.
- The Outlaw's Daughter: Or, Adventures in the South. Claxton, Remsen & Haffelfinger. 1874.
- Clara Moreland; Or, Adventures in the Far South-west. Lupton. 1880.
- Clara Moreland oder Abenteuer im fernen Südwesten Fortsetzung von "Viola" von Emerson Bennett: Aus dem Englischen übersetzt. Christian Ernst Kollmann. 1856.
- The Prairie Flower; and Its Sequel, Leni Leoti: Being Adventures in the Far West. T. B. Peterson & brothers. 1883. (authorship disputed; see History of Oregon Literature, ch. 12)
- The Forest Rose: a tale of the frontier. Fairfield County Republican Print. 1885.
- Forest and prairie or, Life on the frontier. Keystone Pub. Co. 1890.
- Ellen Norbury
- The Orphan's Trials
- Waldewarren
