= Beverly Lynn Bennett =

American chef

Beverly Lynn Bennett is an American vegan chef and author. She hosts the Vegan Chef website; was a regular columnist for VegNews Magazine; and is a former instructor for the Cancer Project, a program of the Physicians' Committee for Responsible Medicine.

== Biography ==
Beverly Lynn Bennett was born in Ohio in 1967. She became a vegetarian in 1987, and earned a culinary arts degree from the University of Akron in 1988. After receiving her degree, she worked at various vegetarian and vegan restaurants, and at natural food stores.

Bennett is in a relationship with her frequent co-author, Ray Sammartano, who is also vegan., whom she lives with in Eugene, Oregon.

== Bibliography ==
=== Cookbooks ===
- The Complete Idiot's Guide to Vegan Living (Alpha Books, 2005)
- The Complete Idiot's Guide to Vegan Cooking (Alpha Books, 2008)
- Vegan Bites: Recipes for Singles (Book Publishing Company, 2008)
- The Complete Idiot's Guide to Gluten-Free Vegan Cooking (Alpha Books, 2011)
- The Complete Idiot's Guide to Vegan Slow Cooking (Alpha Books, 2012)
- The Complete Idiot's Guide to Vegan Living, Second Edition (Alpha Books, 2012)

==== E-cookbooks ====
- Eat Your Veggies! Recipes from the Kitchen of the Vegan Chef
