= Jill Bennett =

Jill Bennett may refer to:

- Jill Bennett (British actress) (1926–1990)
- Jill Bennett (American actress) (born 1975)
- Jill Bennett, character in Knots Landing
