= Granville Bennett (Alabama politician) =

American farmer and politician

Granville Bennett (b. 1824) was an American farmer and state legislator in Alabama. He represented Sumter County, Alabama in the Alabama House of Representatives during the 1872 and 1874 terms. He and other black members of the state legislature who served during and in the years that followed the Reconstruction era are included on a historical marker. A Republican, he signed onto a "Memorial" addressed to U. S. President Ulysses S. Grant.

He was born 1824 in Alabama. He was a farmer. In 1872 he testified he came to Alabama about 1835 at age ten. In his sworn testimony to a committee investigating the 'Condition of affairs in the southern states' he said he lived about 3 miles from Livingston, Alabama at Robert Mason's place which had been Maconico. He testified to not being threatened at his home but having spoken with a father whose son was taken from the man's arms and killed.
