= Herman Bennett (scholar) =

American scholar

Herman L. Bennett (born 1964) is an American scholar who specializes in American and Africana studies particularly the African diaspora and Latin America. He is the author of three academic monographs.

== Biography ==
Bennett received his Ph.D. from Duke University. Bennett has taught at UNC-Chapel Hill, Johns Hopkins, Rutgers, Queen Mary College of London, and the Free University of Berlin. As of 2023 he is a professor at CUNY Graduate Center, and directs the Institute for Research on the African Diaspora in the Americas and the Caribbean.

He became senior editor of The Americas in 2021, and joined the board of the Hispanic American Historical Review that same year.

His African Kings and Black Slaves (2019) uses historical archives of Europe and Africa in order to understand interactions between Europeans and Africans during the first one hundred years of interaction, to reinterpret how European ideas about Africa were shaped by their own cultural and social backgrounds, and how African leaders demanded European participation in African rituals and diplomacy. European preconceptions determined who was to be considered a sovereign people, judgments that were the basis for decisions on who could be enslaved and who couldn't.

== Bibliography ==
- Africans in Colonial Mexico: Absolutism, Christianity, and Afro-Creole Consciousness, 1570-1640 (Indiana UP, 2003)
- Colonial Blackness: A History of Afro-Mexico (Indiana UP, 2009)
- African Kings and Black Slaves: Sovereignty and Dispossession in the Early Modern Atlantic (U of Pennsylvania P, 2019)
