= Tony Bennett (American football) =

American football player (born 1967)

No. 90, 56
- Positions: Linebacker, defensive end

Personal information
- Born: July 1, 1967 (age 59); Alligator, Mississippi, U.S.
- Listed height: 6 ft 2 in (1.88 m)
- Listed weight: 250 lb (113 kg)

Career information
- High school: Coahoma County (Clarksdale, Mississippi)
- College: Ole Miss (1986–1989)
- NFL draft: 1990: 1st round, 18th overall pick

Career history
- Green Bay Packers (1990–1993); Indianapolis Colts (1994–1997)

Awards and highlights
- First-team All-SEC (1989)

Career NFL statistics
- Tackles: 452
- Sacks: 64.5
- Forced fumbles: 19
- Stats at Pro Football Reference

Tony Lydell "Alligator" Bennett (born July 1, 1967) is an American former professional football player who was a linebacker in the National Football League (NFL). He played college football for the Ole Miss Rebels. He was selected by the Green Bay Packers in the first round of the 1990 NFL draft. He finished his professional career with the Indianapolis Colts. Bennett is the uncle of former NFL running back Michael Bennett.
