= Donald W. Bennett =

American general (1927–2025)

Donald William Bennett
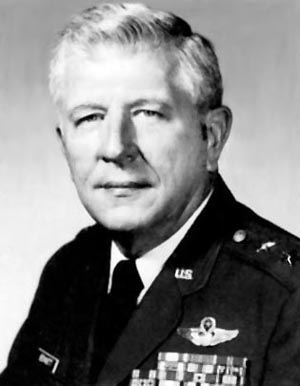
- Born: August 24, 1927; Buckhannon, West Virginia, U.S.
- Died: April 25, 2025 (aged 97); Sunset Hills, Missouri, U.S.
- Military career
- Allegiance: United States of America
- Branch: United States Air Force
- Service years: 1950–1984
- Rank: Major general
- Awards: Order of the Sword, Distinguished Service Medal, Legion of Merit, Bronze Star Medal, Meritorious Service Medal with two oak leaf clusters, Air Force Commendation Medal, Air Force Outstanding Unit Award ribbon with "V" device and five oak leaf clusters, Republic of Vietnam Honor Medal 1st Class and Republic of Vietnam Gallantry Cross with palm

Donald William Bennett (August 24, 1927 – April 25, 2025) was an American major general in the United States Air Force who served as commander, Twenty-Second Air Force, Military Airlift Command, with headquarters at Travis Air Force Base, California.

Bennett was born in Buckhannon, West Virginia, in 1927. He received a Bachelor of Science degree in mechanical engineering from West Virginia University in 1950; graduated from the Royal Air Force Staff College at Andover, England, in 1963; and the Industrial College of the Armed Forces at Fort Lesley J. McNair, Washington, D.C., in 1972. He enlisted and served in the U.S. Navy from October 1945 to June 1946.

Bennett received a direct commission in the U.S. Air Force in 1950 and entered active duty in April 1951 at Greenville Air Force Base, Mississippi. After graduation from pilot training in May 1952, he served as a pilot and aircraft maintenance officer in the 94th Fighter-Interceptor Squadron at George Air Force Base, California, and in the 526th Fighter-Interceptor Squadron at Landstuhl Air Base, Germany. In May 1958 Bennett was assigned to Reserve Officers' Training Corps duty at West Virginia University. He joined the 76th Fighter-Interceptor Squadron at Westover Air Force Base, Massachusetts, as a pilot and maintenance officer in August 1961.

In 1963 Bennett attended the Royal Air Force Staff College and subsequently served with the Royal Air Force on exchange duty as a squadron commander at Royal Air Force Station, Coltishall, England. In January 1966 he was assigned to Dover Air Force Base, Delaware, where he was commander of the 436th Organizational Maintenance Squadron and maintenance control officer for the 436th Military Airlift Wing.

From February 1968 to April 1970, he served at Headquarters Military Airlift Command, Scott Air Force Base, Illinois, as assistant chief, Weapon Systems Division, and chief, Materiel Analysis Division, Office of the Deputy Chief of Staff, Logistics. In April 1970 he was assigned to Tan Son Nhut Air Base, Republic of Vietnam, as an adviser to the deputy chief of staff, logistics, Vietnamese air force.

He attended the Industrial College of the Armed Forces from August 1971 to July 1972. Bennett then moved to Military Airlift Command headquarters as chief of the Maintenance Standardization and Evaluation Team, and director of maintenance engineering. In January 1974 Bennett became vice commander, 62nd Military Airlift Wing at McChord Air Force Base, Wash. In May 1975 he took command of the 60th Military Airlift Wing at Travis Air Force Base.

He returned to Scott Air Force Base in September 1977 as assistant deputy chief of staff, logistics, for the Military Airlift Command and became inspector general in April 1978. In May 1979 he was named the command's deputy chief of staff, logistics.

Bennett was a command pilot with more than 5,000 flying hours and flew C-5s, C-130s, C-141s, F-86A's, F-86D's, F-102s, Hawker Hunters, English Electric Lightnings, and numerous other military and civilian aircraft. His military decorations and awards include the Distinguished Service Medal, Legion of Merit, Bronze Star Medal, Meritorious Service Medal with two oak leaf clusters, Air Force Commendation Medal, Air Force Outstanding Unit Award ribbon with "V" device and five oak leaf clusters, Republic of Vietnam Honor Medal 1st Class and Republic of Vietnam Gallantry Cross with palm.

He was promoted to major general June 30, 1980, with date of rank September 1, 1976. He retired on November 1, 1984. Bennett died on April 25, 2025, at the age of 97.
