= Edwin Keppel Bennett =

British writer (1887–1958)

Edwin Keppel Bennett, noms de plume: Francis Bennett, Francis Keppel (26 September 1887 – 13 June 1958), was an English writer, poet, Germanist, and a prominent academic. He served as the president of Gonville and Caius College, Cambridge between 1948 and 1956.

== Biography ==
Bennett was born at Wareham, Dorset, England, the son of Alfred Hockey Bennett, a confectioner, and his wife Emilie, née Keppel. He was educated at Elm House School, Wareham, under A.E. Skewes; and at the Universität Straßburg, Germany (now in France), under Professor Bartholdy. He entered Gonville and Caius College, Cambridge as a student on 1 October 1914, receiving his B.A. in 1919 (Schuldham Plate, Gonville and Caius College's most prestigious undergraduate award, 1921); and M.A. in 1923. As Ramadge Student, 1921–1923, Bennett was the editor of the Caian, a college magazine; during the Lent term of 1922 he delivered a lecture on 'Poetry and Pessimism'. In 1923 he became 'unofficial fellow' of the college and a Cambridge University lecturer in German. Official fellowship of the college was bestowed on him in 1926, together with the position of Tutor (Senior Tutor, 1931). Bennett resigned from the post of Senior Tutor in 1952, during his presidency of the college.

During the First World War Bennett served in an intelligence unit of the British Army in the rank of second lieutenant (1916–1918), mainly in Palestine.

Bennett's first book, Built in Jerusalem’s Wall: A Book in praise of Jerusalem, was published under the pseudonym 'Francis Keppel' in 1920. His A History of the German "Novelle" from Goethe to Thomas Mann was brought out by Cambridge University Press in 1934 (2nd ed., revised and continued by H.M. Waidson, London, Cambridge University Press, 1961); an important study of George, Stefan George: A Critical Study, appeared under the imprint of Bowes & Bowes in 1954, in a series edited by Erich Heller. Bennett was Erich Heller's doctoral guide at Cambridge; he died in 1958 leaving a large part of the residue of his estate to Gonville and Caius College.

Some of Bennett's poems are published in Edward Davison, comp., Cambridge Poets, 1914–1920: An Anthology (Cambridge, W. Heffer & Sons, 1920). In the Michaelmas 1920 edition of the Caian (vol. 29, p. 29) there appears Bennett's poem entitled 'The Stranger':

:The room grows silent, and the dead return:

Whispering faintly in the corridor,
They try the latch and steal across the floor
Towards my chair; and in the hush I turn
Eagerly to the shadows, and discern
The ghosts of friends whom I shall see no more,
Come back, come back from some Lethean shore
To the old kindly life for which they yearn.

How still they are! O, wherefore can I see
No sign of recognition in the eyes
That gaze in mine? Have they forgotten me
Who was their friend? They fade into the gloom;
And on my heart their plaintive murmur dies:
"A stranger now, a stranger fills his room".

He is buried in the Parish of the Ascension Burial Ground in Cambridge.
