= Jake Bennett (footballer) =

English footballer (born 1996)

Personal information
- Full name: Jake William Bennett
- Date of birth: 22 February 1996 (age 30)
- Place of birth: Telford, England
- Position: Defender

Team information
- Current team: Mickleover

Senior career*
| Years | Team | Apps | (Gls) |
| 2012–2014 | A.F.C. Telford United | 4 | (0) |
| 2013 | → Market Drayton Town (loan) | | |
| 2014 | Market Drayton Town | | |
| 2014–2017 | Mickleover Sports | | |
| 2017–2019 | Sheffield United | 0 | (0) |
| 2018–2019 | → Chesterfield (loan) | 0 | (0) |
| 2019 | Alfreton Town | 2 | (0) |
| 2019–2020 | Coalville Town | | |
| 2020– | Mickleover | | |
- * Club domestic league appearances and goals as of 18:00, 13 December 2019 (UTC)

Jake William Bennett (born 22 February 1996) is an English footballer who plays for Mickleover, where he plays as a defender.

== Playing career ==
=== Sheffield United ===
Bennett made his debut for Sheffield United on 9 August 2017 in an EFL Cup fixture at home to Walsall which the home side won 2–1, Jake played for 58 minutes before being replaced by Chris Basham.

=== Alfreton Town ===
Following his departure from Sheffield United, Jake joined National League North side Alfreton Town on 11 October 2019.

=== Coalville Town ===
On 10 December 2019, Jake was confirmed as signing for Southern League Premier Division Central side Coalville Town.

== Personal life ==
Jake is the cousin of fellow footballers Elliott Bennett and Kyle Bennett.
