= Bentt =

Bentt is a surname. Notable people with the name include:

- Luka Bentt (born 2007), Association football player
- Michael Bentt, American boxer

== See also ==
- Bent, Benet, Benett, Benetti, Bennet, Bennetts, Bennett, Bennette, Bennetto
