= Bennet (surname) =

Bennet is an English language surname and, less commonly, a given name

Bennet is an Anglo-Norman English surname with Norman roots, from the medieval personal name Benedict (from the Latin Benedictus, 'blessed'). In the 12th century, it became a common given name throughout Europe due to the popularity of St Benedict (c. 480 – c. 543). The Latin form of the name was found in England, alongside versions derived from the Old French forms Beneit and Benoit, which was common among the Normans.

Notable people with the surname include:

- Abraham Bennet (1749–buried 1799), English physicist
- Carl Bennet (born 1951), Swedish businessman and billionaire
- Charles Bennet, 6th Earl of Tankerville (1810–1899), British peer and politician
- Chloe Bennet (born 1992), American actress
- Christopher Bennet (1617–1655), English physician
- Douglas J. Bennet (1938–2018), American diplomat and president of Wesleyan University
- Eduardo Bennet (born 1968), Honduran soccer player
- Ferdinando Bennet (1850–1929), English soldier and cricketer
- Henry Bennet, 1st Earl of Arlington (1618–1685), English statesman
- Isabella Bennet, 2nd Countess of Arlington (c. 1668–1723), British peer and heiress
- James Bennet, a number of individuals with the name
  - James Bennet (clergyman) (1817–1901), Irish Presbyterian clergyman, writer and author
  - James Bennet (journalist), American newspaper and magazine editor
  - James Bennet (politician) (1830–1908), Liberal Party Member of Parliament in New Zealand
- John Bennet, a number of individuals with the name
  - John Bennet of the Bennet baronets
  - John Bennet (composer) (c. 1575–after 1614), English composer
  - John Bennet (judge) (1552/3–1627), English judge and MP accused of corruption
  - John Bennet (preacher) (1714–1759), English Methodist preacher
  - John Bennet (MP) (1628–1663), English landowner and politician
  - John Bennet, 1st Baron Ossulston (1616–1695), English statesman
  - John Bennet (archaeologist) (born 1951), British archaeologist and Professor of Aegean Archaeology at Sheffield University
- Keane Grace Wallis Bennet (died 2014), British girl who died in an accident
- Lyn Bennet, American politician from Montana
- Michael Bennet (born 1964), United States politician, Senator from Colorado
- Naftali Bennett, Prime minister of Israel 2021–2022
- Olivia Bennet (1830–1922), British countess
- Spencer Gordon Bennet (1893–1987), American film producer and director
- Thomas Bennet, a number of individuals with the name
  - Thomas Bennet (clergyman), English clergyman
  - Thomas Bennet (academic), British academic and administrator, Master of University College, Oxford
- William Bennet, a number of individuals with the name
  - William Bennet (MP for Ripon) (died 1609), MP for Ripon
  - William Bennet (bishop) (1746–1820), Bishop of Cloyne and antiquary
  - William Bennet (musician) (1767?–1833?), English musician
  - William Stiles Bennet (1870–1962), American politician
  - William S. Bennet II (1934–2009), American business executive
  - William Bennet (engineer) (active 1790–1826), English canal engineer (also spelled Bennett)
  - Sir William Bennet, 1st Baronet (died 1710) of the Bennet baronets
  - Sir William Bennet, 2nd Baronet (died 1729), member of 1st Parliament of Great Britain
  - Sir William Bennet, 3rd Baronet (died 1733) of the Bennet baronets

== Fictional characters ==
Fictional characters with the surname include:

- The Bennet family in Jane Austen's Pride and Prejudice
  - Mr. Bennet (Pride and Prejudice)
  - Mrs. Bennet
  - Elizabeth Bennet, daughter of the above
- The Bennet family in the Heroes TV series:
  - Claire Bennet, cheerleader character
  - Noah Bennet, adoptive father of Claire, known as "Horn-Rimmed Glasses"
  - Sandra Bennet, Noah's wife and Claire's adoptive mother
  - Lyle Bennet, son of Noah and Sandra
- Bennet from the 1985 action film Commando
- Vice President Kathryn Bennet, a character from the 1997 action film Air Force One

== See also ==
- Bent, Benet, Benett, Bennet, Bennetts, Bennett, Bennette, Bennetti
