= Bennetto =

Bennette is a surname and a given name. Notable people with the name include:

- Bennetto Payne (1909–1987), Mexican boxer
- Casey Bennetto, Australian writer and musician
- Wilfred Bennetto, Cornish poet and novelist
- Wilfred Bennetto Currie or Wilfred Currie, Scottish Anglican priest

== See also ==
- Bent, Benet, Benett, Bennet, Bennetts, Bennett, Bennette, Bennetti, Bennetto
