= Hellbent =

Hellbent or Hell Bent may refer to:

== Film and television ==
- Hell Bent (film), a 1918 silent Western film
- Hellbent (film), a 2004 slasher film
- "Hell Bent" (Doctor Who), an episode of the TV series Doctor Who
- "Hell Bent" (Wentworth), an episode of the TV series Wentworth

== Music ==
- H3llb3nt, an electro-industrial supergroup
- Hell Bent (album), a 2013 album by Potty Mouth
- Hellbent, a 2019 album by Randy Rogers Band
- Hellbent, a 2021 album by indie-pop group Autoheart
- "Hellbent", a song by New Order from the 2013 album Lost Sirens
- "Hellbent", a song by Self from the 2017 album Ornament & Crime
- "Hellbent", a song by Janani K. Jha from the 2024 album The Rest of the Laurels

== Other uses ==
- Hellbent (McGowan novel), a 2005 novel by Anthony McGowan
- Hellbent (Hurwitz novel), a 2018 novel by Gregg Hurwitz
- Hell Bent, a 2023 novel by Leigh Bardugo

== See also ==
- Hell Bent for Leather (disambiguation)
- Hell (disambiguation)
- Bent (disambiguation)
