= Bent (surname) =

Bent is a surname. As a German surname, it may be a contraction of Bernhard. Notable people with the surname include:

- Alex Bent (born 1993), percussionist for American heavy metal band Trivium
- Amel Bent (born 1985), French singer
- Ann Bent (1768–1857), American businesswoman
- Arthur Cleveland Bent (1866–1954), American ornithologist
- Bruce R. Bent, American financier
- Charles Bent first American Governor of the New Mexico Territory
- Charles Bent (1919–2004), composer of chess endgame studies
- Cory Bent (born 1997), English footballer
- Dan Bent (born 1996), Gibraltarian footballer
- Darren Bent (born 1984), English football (soccer) player
- Desharne Bent-Ashmeil (born 2004), British diver
- Ellis Bent (1783–1815), Deputy Judge Advocate for New South Wales, Australia
- Geoff Bent (1932–1958), English football (soccer) player
- George Bent (1843–1918), a son of William Bent, American Civil War soldier and Cheyenne warrior
- Henry A. Bent (1926/1927–2015), physical chemist
- James Theodore Bent (1852–1897), English explorer and archaeologist
- Jason Bent (born 1977), Canadian football (soccer) player
- Jeffery Hart Bent (1781–1852), first judge of the colony of New South Wales, Australia
- Jevene Bent, former Jamaican police officer
- John Bent (politician) (c. 1775–1848), English politician MP for Sligo Borough and Totnes
- John Bent (brewer) (1793–1857), English brewer and Mayor of Liverpool
- Johnny Bent (1908–2004), American hockey player
- Junior Bent (born 1970), English football (soccer) player
- Kimball Bent (1837–1916), American soldier and adventurer
- Lyriq Bent, Canadian actor
- Marcus Bent (born 1978), English football (soccer) player
- Margaret Bent (born 1940), English musicologist
- Paul Bent (born 1965), former English cricketer
- Philip Bent (1891–1917), Canadian recipient of the Victoria Cross
- Ridley Bent (born 1979), Canadian indie rock singer-songwriter
- Robert Bent (1745–1832), English politician, father of Ellis Bent and Jeffery Hart Bent
- Silas Bent (1768–1827), judge on the bench of the Missouri Supreme Court
- Silas Bent (1820–1887), U.S. Navy officer
- Silas Bent (1852–1945), American journalist
- Spencer John Bent (1891–1977), English Victoria Cross recipient
- Thomas Bent (1838–1909), Australian politician, 22nd Premier of Victoria
- William Bent (1809–1869), American trapper, rancher and frontier diplomat
- River Wilson-Bent (born 1994), British boxer

== See also ==
- Bent (given name)
- Bendt, Bent, Bentt, Benet, Benett, Benetti, Bennet, Bennette, Bennetto, Bennetts, Bennett
- Barend, Barends, Barnard, Behrendt, Bendt, Bent, Berend, Berent Berendt, Behrent, Bernard, Bernhard, Bernhardt, Bernd, Bernt, Berndt
- Benard, Bénard, Besnard, Berardi, Bernardi, Bernardin, Bernardini, Bernardino, Bernardo, Bernardoni, Bernardy
- Template:Bear-surname
