= Bennetts (surname) =

Bennetts is a surname. Notable people with the surname include:

- Colin Bennetts (1940–2013), British Anglican bishop
- Edgar "Dickie" Bennetts, (1907–1946), Australian rules football player
- Harold William Bennetts (1898–1970), Australian veterinarian
- Keanan Bennetts (born 1999), English footballer
- Peter Bennetts (born 1967), Australian artist

== See also ==
- Bendt, Bent, Bentt, Benet, Benett, Benetti, Bennet, Bennette, Bennetto, Bennetts, Bennett
