= Liberton =

Liberton may refer to:

- Liberton, Edinburgh, Scotland, a suburb
  - Liberton High School
- Liberton, New Zealand, a suburb of Dunedin
