= Thomas Benet =

Thomas Benet may refer to:

- Thomas Bennet (academic) or Benet, British academic and administrator at the University of Oxford.
- Thomas Benet (martyr) (died 1531), English Protestant martyr

== See also ==
- Thomas Bennett (disambiguation)
