= BlöödHag =

American death metal band

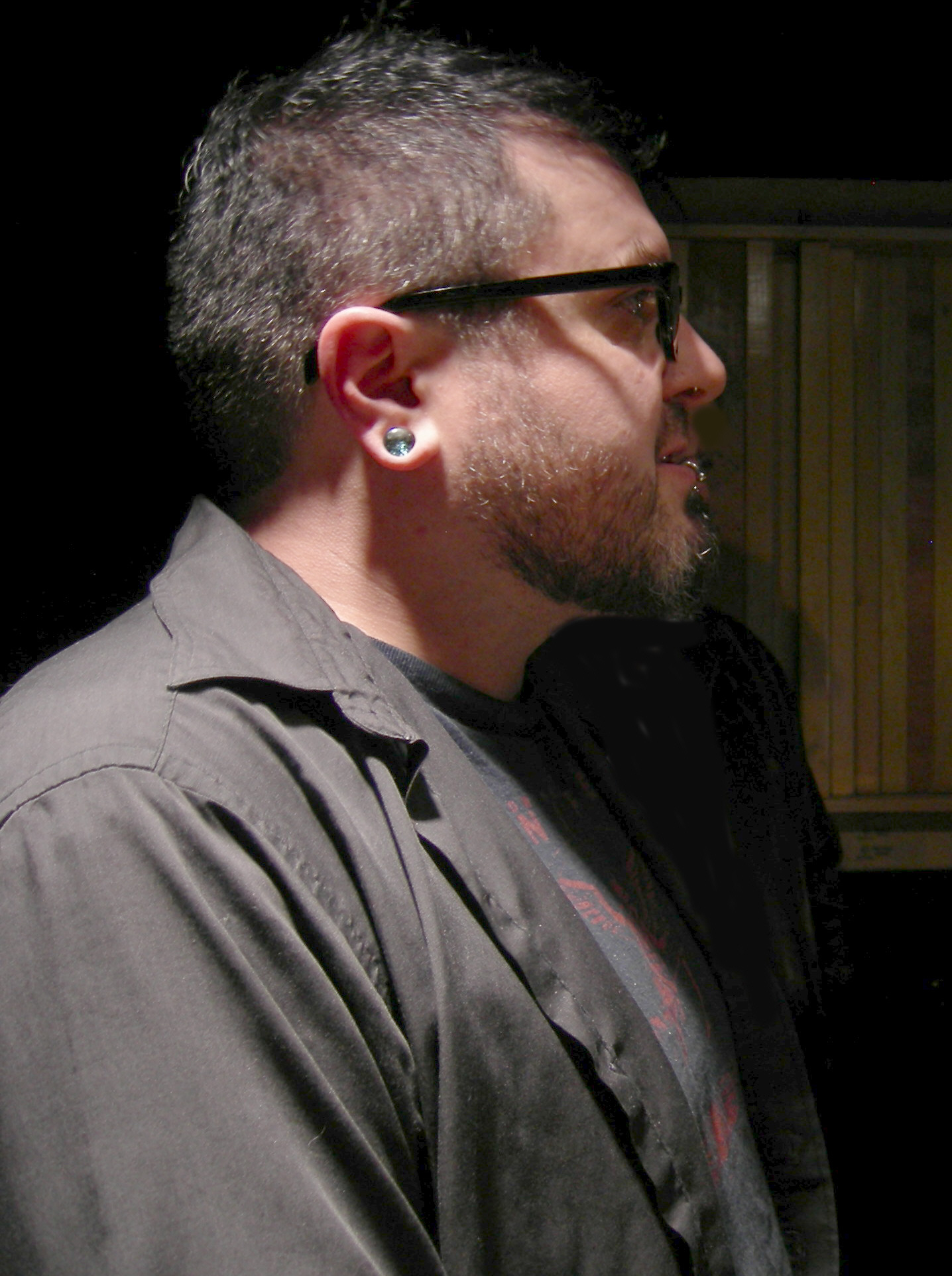
- Guitarist Jeff McNulty (2007)

Background information
- Origin: Seattle, Washington, U.S.
- Genres: Death metal, hardcore punk
- Years active: 1996‒2010
- Labels: Alternative Tentacles, Spork!, Rock & Roleplay, Extravertigo
- Members: Jeff McNulty; Jake Stratton; Zachary Orgel; Brent Carpenter
- Past members: Rodd Karp
- Website: bloodhag.inwa.net

BlöödHag was an American death metal band from Seattle, Washington. Self-described by the genre "edu-core", the group played short songs with lyrics consisting of biographical and bibliographical information, observations, and abstractions of science fiction, fantasy, and seminal horror authors.

== History ==
BlöödHag was formed in 1996 as a two-piece, four-track recording project with Dr. J.M. McNulty on guitar and Professor Jake Stratton singing but soon added Sir Zachary Orgel on bass and a drum machine dubbed "Philthy 'The Drum Machine' Taylor". After playing local Seattle clubs for two years, BlöödHag added live drummer Rodd Karp who was subsequently replaced by Ambassador Brent Carpenter.

BlöödHag was accredited by the King County Library System as fitting the criteria for a literacy program. BlöödHag has embarked on several tours of libraries in the Pacific Northwest, as well as playing in traditional music venues. BlöödHag has since toured libraries all around the country including Chicago, Boston, New York City, Athens, Austin, Oklahoma City, Las Vegas, Minneapolis/St. Paul, Oakland, and New Orleans. The band played at the 2004 Nebula Awards in Seattle, Washington.

In 2006, the band was signed to the Alternative Tentacles label who released their full-length CD and record entitled Hell Bent For Letters.

Members of the band have subsequently had some of their short fiction published in the compendium, Mecca|Mettle, a collaboration with Thomas M. Disch and Hugo-winning artist Tim Kirk. Mecca|Mettle is published by Payseur & Schmidt.

From 2009-2010, BlöödHag stopped touring and slowed their schedule of live performances. Their last show was held on April 9, 2010, at the Seattle club, The Funhouse, alongside the groups Captured! by Robots from San Francisco and Stovokor from Portland.

== Media ==
The documentary, BlöödHag: The Faster You Go Deaf…The More Time You Have To Read, premiered at the South by Southwest Film Festival in 2001. It won the Audience Award for best short at the San Francisco Independent Documentary Film Festival and was chosen by The Young Adult Library Services Association (YALSA) as one of the top DVDs and Videos for Young Adults for 2003. The documentary has been shown on PBS stations in the United States and Canada.

BlöödHag has been featured in The Seattle Times, The Seattle Weekly, The Stranger, and The Rocket. They have been featured nationally on the Associated Press Newswire, The Library Journal, American Libraries, Flagpole Magazine, The San Francisco Bay Guardian, Thrasher Magazine, and Sound on Sound. A library show in Bellevue, Washington, was the subject of an NPR Weekend Edition report. Internationally, BlöödHag has been the subject of stories on BBC Radio 4, Canadian AP Newswire, and The Guardian (London).

On August 18, 2017, Stratton allegedly teased media personality Alex Jones as Jones broadcast live video from Seattle. Stratton or a person resembling him was filmed throwing a thermos of tepid coffee at Jones. Subsequently, Stratton told Jones and his Infowars live audience, "I got to get to work. Where they have more coffee." Jones proceeded to confront other people on the street.

== Members ==
In keeping with the literary theme, the band has conferred upon themselves both academic titles and bibliographic histories:

- Dr. J.M. McNulty (a.k.a. Deus Ex Libris the Plagiarazor) ‒ guitar
- Professor J. B. Stratton (a.k.a. Grimoire the Expectorator) ‒ vocals
- Sir Zachary Orgel (a.k.a. Logos the Rythmaticist) ‒ bass
- Ambassador Brent Carpenter (a.k.a. Codex 23 the Chronomaster) ‒ drums

=== Former members ===
- Lieutenant Governor Rodd Karp (a.k.a. Lexikhan the Chronomaster) ‒ drums

== Featured authors ==
Some of the authors to have been featured in songs include the following:

- Douglas Adams
- Isaac Asimov
- Iain M. Banks
- Ray Bradbury
- Octavia E. Butler
- Edgar Rice Burroughs
- William S. Burroughs
- Orson Scott Card
- Arthur C. Clarke
- Samuel R. Delany
- Philip K. Dick
- Thomas M. Disch
- Harlan Ellison
- William Gibson
- Robert A. Heinlein
- Frank Herbert
- Robert E. Howard
- Franz Kafka
- Ursula K. Le Guin
- H. P. Lovecraft
- Anne McCaffrey
- Michael Moorcock
- George Orwell
- Edgar Allan Poe
- Thomas Pynchon
- Mary Wollstonecraft Shelley
- Robert Silverberg
- Neal Stephenson
- J. R. R. Tolkien
- Jules Verne
- Kurt Vonnegut
- H. G. Wells
- Gene Wolfe
- Roger Zelazny

== Select discography ==
=== Albums ===
- 2001: Necrotic Bibliophilia (Rock & Roleplay)
- 2006: Hell Bent for Letters (Alternative Tentacles)
- Appetite for Deconstruction ‒ unreleased tapes

=== Singles/EPs ===
- 1997: The Dewey Decibel System (Spork!)
- 1998: Hooked On Demonics (Spork!)
- 1999: Gorgeous Ladies of Writing (Rock & Roleplay)

=== Compilations ===
- 1997: Blue Collar, Muscle Bitches, Inertia, BlöödHag, pro' ton (n.) ‒ New World Hors D'oeuvres (Volume One) (Extravertigo Recordings)
- 2005: BlöödHag, Thomas M. Disch And X's For Eyes ‒ Mecca|Mettle (Payseur & Schmidt)
