= James Bennett =

James, Jimmy, Jimmie, or Jim Bennett may refer to:

== Arts and entertainment ==
- James Gordon Bennett Sr. (1795–1872), American founding publisher of the New York Herald newspaper
- James Gordon Bennett Jr. (1841–1918), American newspaper publisher and sports enthusiast
- James O'Donnell Bennett (1870–1940), American journalist and author
- Jim Bennett (poet) (born 1951), English poet
- Jimmy Bennett (born 1996), American actor and musician
- Jimmy Ray Bennett, American actor
- James Bennett, British Fantasy Award winning author

== Politics and law ==
- James Bennett (Australian politician) (1874–1951), Member of the Australian House of Representatives
- James Bennett (British politician) (1912–1984), Scottish Labour Party politician and MP
- James L. Bennett (1849–1918), American lawyer from New York
- James R. Bennett (1940–2016), Alabama secretary of state and state senator
- Jim Bennett (politician) (fl. 2006–2015), Newfoundland and Labrador MHA
- Jim Bennett (Utah politician), candidate in the 2017 Utah's 3rd congressional district special election

== Science and medicine ==
- James C. Bennett (born 1948), American technologist and space launch pioneer
- James Henry Bennett (1816–1891), English physician
- Sir James Risdon Bennett (1809–1891), English physician
- Jim Bennett (historian) (1947–2023), British museum curator and historian of science

== Sports ==
- James Bennett (Australian footballer) (born 1964), Australian rules footballer with Hawthorn
- James Bennett (cricketer) (1775–1855), English cricketer
- James Bennett (footballer, born 1988), English footballer
- James Bennett (Scottish footballer) (1891–1955), Scottish footballer
- Jimmie Bennett (1919–1991), American baseball player
- Jim Bennett (hurler) (1944–2014), Irish hurler
- Jim Bennett (rugby league) (1898–1968), Australian rugby league footballer

== Others ==
- James Bennett (minister) (1774–1862), English congregationalist minister and college principal
- James Bennett (Tewkesbury) (1785–1856), British printer, bookseller, publisher and antiquarian
- James H. Bennett (1877–?), American sailor and Medal of Honor recipient
- James M. Bennett (born 1948), American nonpartisan tax activist
- James V. Bennett (1894–1978), American penal reformer

== Other uses ==
- James Gordon Bennett (pilot boat), American pilot boat built in 1870

== See also ==
- Jamie Bennett (disambiguation)
- James Bennet (disambiguation)
- Bennett (name)
