= William Bennett (disambiguation) =

William Bennett (born 1943) is an American conservative pundit, political theorist and former Secretary of Education.

William, Bill, or Billy Bennett may also refer to:

== Academia ==
- William Bennett (headmaster) (1858–1934), teacher and teachers' representative in South Australia
- W. E. Bennett (William E. Bennett), American academic
- William G. Bennett (architect) (1896–1977), Australian architect
- Sir William H. Bennett (surgeon) (1852–1931), British surgeon
- William R. Bennett Jr. (1930–2008), American physicist
- William W. Bennett (educator) (1821–1887), American president of Randolph–Macon College from 1877 to 1887

== Music ==
- William Bennett (flautist) (1936–2022), British flute player
- William Bennet (musician) (c. 1767–1833), English musician
- William Bennett (oboist) (1956–2013), San Francisco Symphony oboist
- William Sterndale Bennett (1816–1875), British composer
- Willie P. Bennett (1951–2008), Canadian folk music singer-songwriter
- William Bennett (noise musician), British experimental musician

== Politics ==
- W. A. C. Bennett (1900–1979), premier of British Columbia
- William Bennett (Australian politician) (1843–1929), member of the Tasmanian Parliament
- William Bennett (English politician) (1873–1937), member of parliament for Battersea South, 1929–1931
- William Gordon Bennett (1900–1982), Unionist Party (Scotland) MP for Glasgow Woodside, 1950–1955
- William Humphrey Bennett (1859–1925), Canadian senator
- William M. Bennett (1869–1930), New York politician
- William Weaver Bennett (1841–1912), mayor of Teaneck, New Jersey, 1895–1907
- Bill Bennett (1932–2015), premier of British Columbia and son of W. A. C Bennett
- Bill Bennett (Liberal MLA) (born 1950), British Columbia politician
- William A. Bennett (1887–1970), mayor of Worcester, Massachusetts

== Religion ==
- William Bennet (bishop) (1746–1820), spelled Bennett on his memorial in Cloyne Cathedral
- William Bennett (clergyman) (c. 1770–1857), British-born Methodist minister
- W. J. E. Bennett (1804–1886), Anglican priest
- William H. Bennett (Mormon) (1910–1980), Canadian agronomist and leader in The Church of Jesus Christ of Latter-day Saints
- William Henry Bennett (biblical scholar) (1855–1920), British Congregationalist minister and biblical scholar

== Sports ==
=== Association football ===
- William Bennett (footballer) (1896–?), English footballer with Nelson
- William Bennett (football manager), Cuban football manager
- Billy Bennett (footballer, born 1871) (1871–1932), English footballer who played for Crewe Alexandra
- Billy Bennett (footballer, born 1878) (1878–1953), English footballer who played for Small Heath
- Billy Bennett (footballer, born 1955), Scottish footballer

=== Other sports ===
- William Bennett (cricketer) (1807–1886), English cricketer
- Bill Bennett (footballer) (born 1948), former Australian rules footballer
- Bill Bennett (ice hockey) (born 1953), American former ice hockey left winger

== Other people ==
- William Bennett (Australian engineer) (1824–1889), (William Christopher Bennett) Irish-Australian surveyor and engineer
- William Bennett (painter) (1811–1871), English watercolour painter
- William Cox Bennett (1820–1895), English poet
- William G. Bennett (gaming executive) (1924–2002), American gaming executive and real estate developer
- William H. Bennett (newspaperman) (1879–1939), newspaper editor and proprietor in Peterborough, South Australia
- William James Bennett (1787–1844), English watercolour painter
- William Mineard Bennett (1778–1858), English miniature-painter
- William Tapley Bennett Jr. (1917–1994), American diplomat
- Bill Bennett (director) (born 1953), Australian film director
- Billy Bennett (comedian) (1887–1942), British comedian

== Other uses ==
- RNLB William Bennett, an RNLI lifeboat

== See also ==
- Billie Bennett (1874–1951), American actress
- William Hart-Bennett (1861–1918), British government official who served overseas
- William Bennet (disambiguation)
- William Benet (disambiguation)
- Bennett (name)
