= William Bennet =

William Bennet may refer to:

- William Bennet (MP for Ripon) (died 1609), MP for Ripon
- William Bennet (minister) (died 1647), Scottish clergyman, minister of Trinity College Kirk
- William Bennet (bishop) (1746–1820), Bishop of Cloyne and antiquary
- William Bennet (musician) (1767?–1833?), English musician
- William Stiles Bennet (1870–1962), American politician
- William S. Bennet II (1934–2009), American business executive
- William Bennet (engineer) (active 1790–1826), English canal engineer (also spelled Bennett)
- Sir William Bennet, 1st Baronet (died 1710) of the Bennet baronets
- Sir William Bennet of Grubet (2nd Baronet) (died 1729), member of 1st Parliament of Great Britain
- Sir William Bennet, 3rd Baronet (died 1733) of the Bennet baronets

== See also ==
- William Bennett (disambiguation)
- William Benet (disambiguation)
