= Bent man =

Bent man, bent men, Bentman, Bentmen, or variation, may refer to:

- The funny man, as opposed to the straight man, in a comedy duo
- Homosexual man, one who is not "straight"
- Drunkard, a man who is drunk
  - Substance intoxication, a man who is high
- An immoral man, particularly lying and criminality, see immorality

== See also ==
- Bent (disambiguation)
- Man (disambiguation)
- Men (disambiguation)
