= Bent =

Bent may refer to:

== Places ==
- Bent, Iran, a city in Sistan and Baluchestan Province, Iran
- Bent District, an administrative subdivision of Iran
- Bent, Netherlands, a village in the municipality of Rijnwoude, the Netherlands
- Bent County, Colorado, United States
- Bents, Saskatchewan, an unincorporated community in Canada
- Bent's Old Fort National Historic Site, frontier trading post, in La Junta, Colorado

== Arts and entertainment ==
- Bent (play), a 1979 play by Martin Sherman
  - Bent (1997 film), a 1997 film by Sean Mathias based on the play
- Bent (2018 film), an American crime thriller film
- Bent (TV series), an NBC romantic television comedy series
- Bent (band), an electronica duo from England
- "Bent" (Matchbox Twenty song), a 2000 rock song
- "Bent" (41 song), a 2023 Brooklyn drill song
- Bent (magazine), a UK gay lifestyle magazine
- Bent (Ssion album), a 2012 electropop album
- Bent (Stonefield album), a 2019 psychedelic rock album
- "Bent" (The Lincoln Lawyer), a 2022 television episode

== Science ==
- Bent molecular geometry, in chemistry
- Bent's rule, about atomic orbital hybridization
- Bent grass or bent, the plant genus Agrostis

== Other uses ==
- Bent (surname)
- Bent (given name)
- Bent (structural), a repeated cross-sectional sub-structure of a frame
- Bent, the insignia of the engineering honor society Tau Beta Pi

== See also ==
- Bend (disambiguation)
