= Jamie Bennett =

Jamie Bennett may refer to:

- Jamie Bennett (artist) (born 1948), American artist and educator

== See also ==
- James Bennett (disambiguation)
