= Hell Bent for Leather =

Hell Bent for Leather may refer to:

- Hell Bent for Leather!, a 1962 album by Frankie Laine
- Hell Bent for Leather, the US title of the Judas Priest album Killing Machine, 1978
  - "Hell Bent for Leather" (song), the title song of the US version
- Hell Bent for Leather, a 2009 album by Milan the Leather Boy
- Hell Bent for Leather (film), a 1960 western starring Audie Murphy

== See also ==
- Hell Bent Forever: A Tribute to Judas Priest, a 2008 tribute album
- Hell Bent for Letters, a 2006 album by BlöödHag
