= James Bennet =

James Bennet may refer to:

- James Bennet (journalist) (born 1966), American journalist
- James Bennet (politician) (1830–1908), Liberal Party Member of Parliament in New Zealand
- James Bennet (clergyman) (1817–1901), Presbyterian clergyman and author
- James Arlington Bennet (1788–1863), American attorney, newspaper publisher, educator, author

== See also ==
- James Bennett (disambiguation)
