= William Benet =

William Benet may refer to:

- William Rose Benét (1886–1950), American poet, writer, and editor
- William Benet (MP) (1381–1463), MP for Canterbury and Mayor of Canterbury
- William Benet (diplomat) (died 1533), 16th-century English ambassador

== See also ==
- William Bennet (disambiguation)
- William Bennett (disambiguation)
