= Alpa-Reflex Camera =

The Alpa-Reflex of 1944-1952
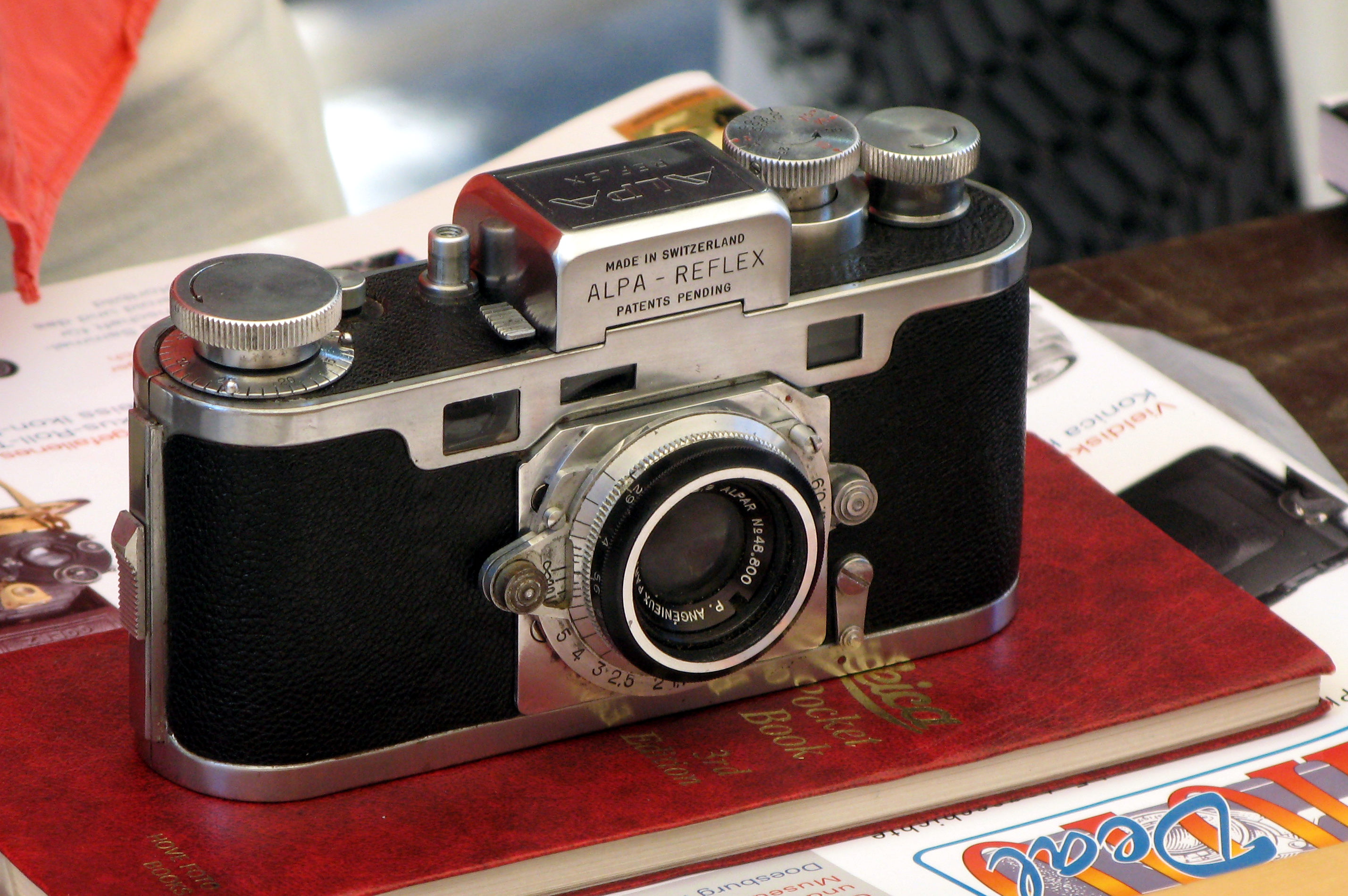

Overview
- Type: 35mm SLR camera

Lens
- Lens mount: Alpa bayonet

Focusing
- Focus: lens helical

Exposure/metering
- Exposure: 24 × 36mm on 35mm film

The 35mm SLR camera Alpa-Reflex has its origins back in the 1930s when a Swiss precision mechanical manufacturer decided to diversify their product range, having mainly relied on manufacturing parts for the watch industry. They sought outside assistance and by 1939 the plans were ready and building cameras commenced at a very slow rate. The camera was eventually named the Alpa because it was light, pocketable, and might easily be brought along travelling in the Alps. The Alpa-Reflex is only predated by the Kine Exakta, the Sport, and the Praktiflex 35mm SLRs. The manufacturer was Pignons S.A, Ballaigues, and the designer was Jacques Bolsky born December 31, 1895, in Kiev as Yakob Bogopolsky. He emigrated to the United States of America once the design was completed. He was also the inventor of the renowned Bolsey and Bolex cine cameras.

== Camera production ==
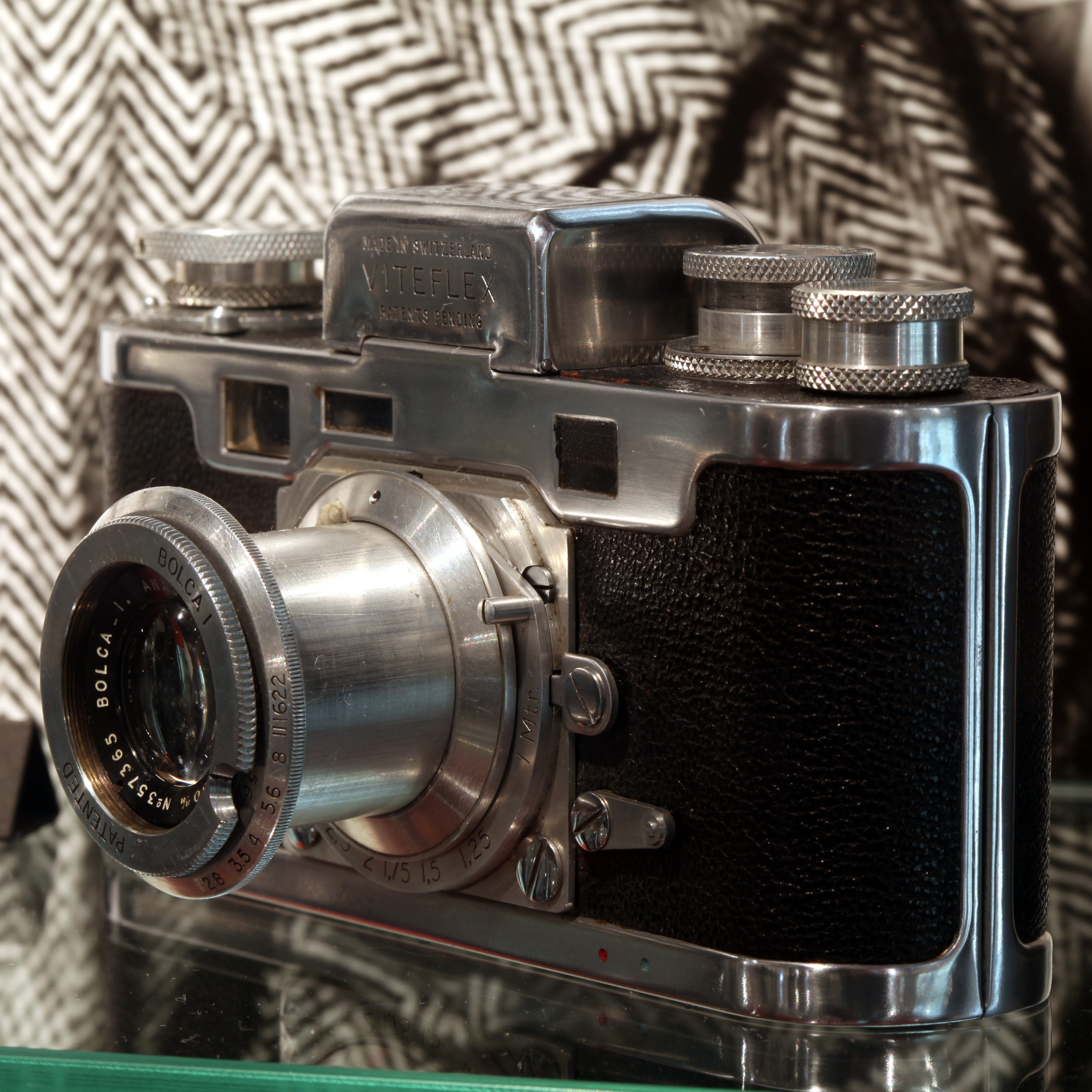
Viteflex

Pignons S.A. never aimed at producing cameras in large quantities, but rather at quality and they often made cameras to special order, incorporating features as requested by the customer. Lenses were subcontracted to several well-known manufactures. Prototype production began in 1939. A test series of 20 cameras was completed by 1941, the series A, starting at serial number 10.001. Some of these were called BOLCA Reflex, some TELEFLEX and some VITEFLEX. In 1942 a small production series B starting at serial number 11.000 was completed for local sale, but no record of it exists at the factory. By now, the Alpa trademark had been chosen and the camera became the Alpa-Reflex. The camera was first presented for a wider public in April 1944 at the Swiss Trade Fair in Basel (Schweizer Mustermesse), and soon production began in earnest with the series C, albeit at a very slow rate: 115 was made in 1944 and 434 in 1945. In addition to the SLR camera, a few rangefinder cameras were produced, the Standard, that lacks the reflex finder. By accident, the series C has a six-digit serial number, starting at 120.001. The series D began in 1945 at serial number 13.000, the factory now reverting to the five-digit format. Some 1.350 cameras were produced during a two-year period, ending in 1947 at serial number 15.020, the serial number range including all models and types manufactured. The series E was the last series of the original Alpa-Reflex; it begins at 20.000 with only minor improvements. It ends at 25.032 in 1951.

In 1949, the Alpa Prisma-Reflex was introduced, sporting a pentaprism finder, which was a new feature in 35mm SLR cameras about this time; also seen a year before on the Rectaflex from Rome, Italy, and the Contax S from Zeiss Ikon in Dresden. Production of this first generation ALPA-Reflex and the ALPA Prisma-Reflex cameras continued smoothly until 1952, at which point the factory had made some 5.000 more cameras. In 1952, Pignons S.A introduced a new range of cameras, employing completely new production techniques.
