= Jacques Bogopolsky =

Jacques Bogopolsky (also Jacques Boolsky or Jacques Bolsey; born Yakov Bogopolsky; December 31, 1895, Kiev, Kiev Governorate, Russian Empire – January 20, 1962, Long Island) was an engineer and camera designer.

== Early life ==
He was born into a Jewish family.

== Career ==
He was an inventor of movie cameras. The brand name Bolex comes from his name. He was also instrumental in the initial design of the Alpa-Reflex Camera 35mm single-lens reflex camera that later was developed into the Alpa cameras.

== Bolsey Camera Company ==
In 1947, Jacques Bolsey founded Bolsey Camera Company, after making cameras for US military during WW2, making the Bolsey B, a consumer 35mm, similar to the mil-spec devices. In 1956, the company closed, when Bolsey sold to Wittnauer.

=== 35mm rangefinder ===
- Bolsey B (1947-1949)
- Bolsey B2 (1949-1956)
- Bolsey B22 (1953-1956)
- Bolsey Jubilee (1955-1956)
- Bolsey B3 (1956)
- Wittnauer Festival (1957), sold by Wittnauer

=== 35mm TLR + rangefinder ===
- Bolsey C (1950-1956)
- Bolsey C22 (1953-1956)

=== 35mm viewfinder ===
- Bolsey A
- La Belle Pal
- Bolsey Explorer (made by Braun)

=== 8mm subminiature ===
- Bolsey 8
- Bolsey Uniset 8

=== 120 pseudo-TLR ===
- Bolsey-Flex
- Bolseyflex

=== Further reading ===
- Bolsey at Pacific Rim Camera
- Bolsey .pdf manuals at butkus.org's orphan cameras
- Various Bolsey cameras at collection-appareils.fr (French)
- Bolsey page at Collection G. Even (French)
- Bolsey 126 patents
