= Bolex =

Swiss luxury camera manufacturer

Coordinates: 46.45535°N 6.390115°E

Bolex International SA

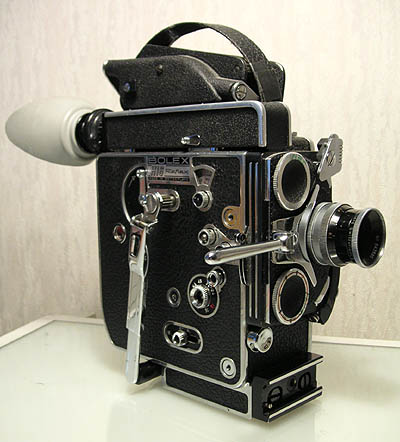
- Industry: Camera Manufacturing
- Founded: 1925
- Founder: Charles Haccius and Jacques Bogopolsky
- Headquarters: Yverdon, Switzerland
- Area served: Worldwide
- Key people: Hugo Diaz (Administrator)
- Products: Motion Picture Cameras
- Website: bolex.com

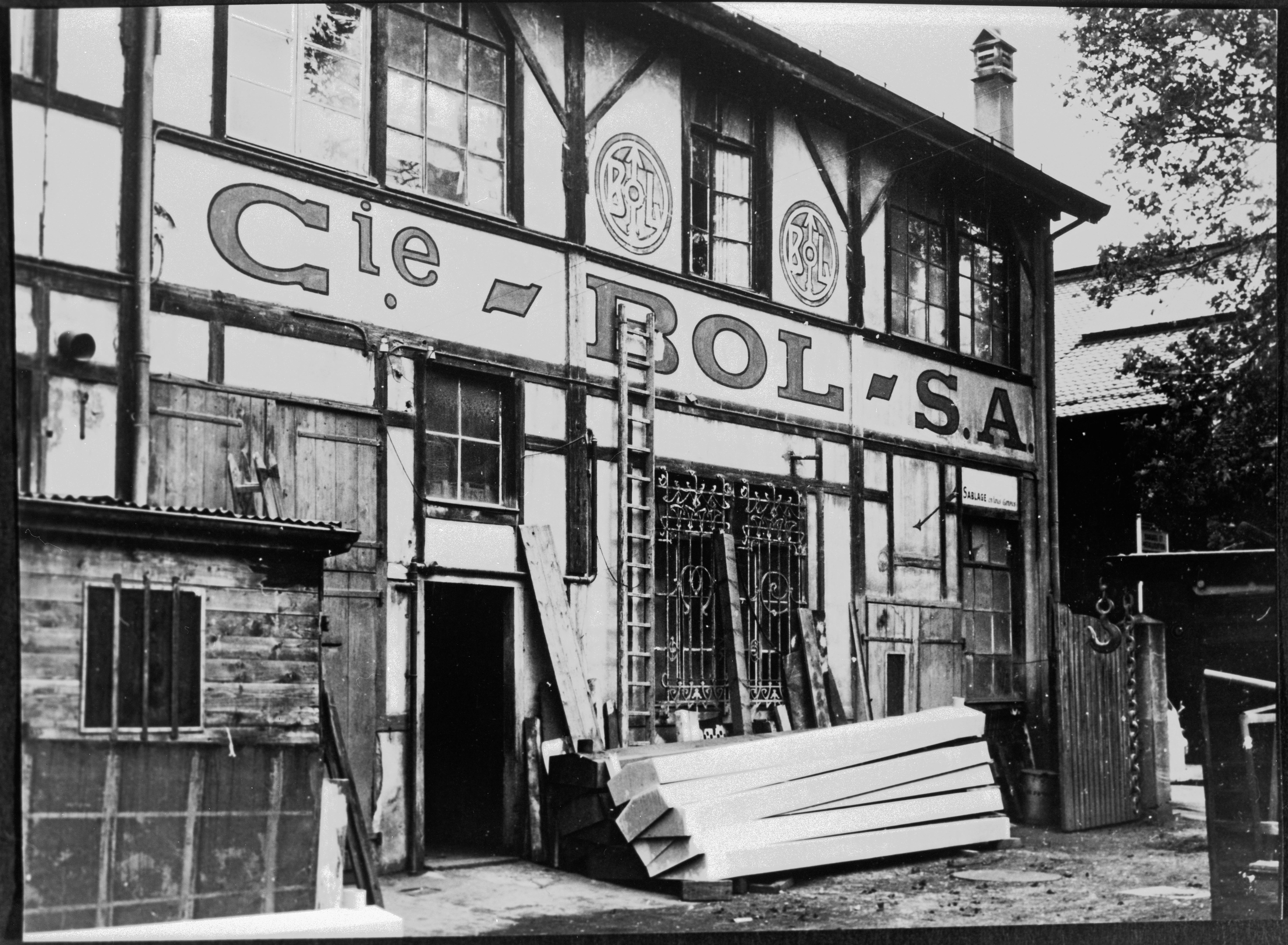
Usine Bol, Geneva, Switzerland

Bolex International S. A. is a Swiss manufacturer of motion picture cameras based in Yverdon located in Canton of Vaud, the most notable products of which are in the 16 mm and Super 16 mm formats. Originally Bol, the company was founded in 1925 by Charles Haccius and Jacques Bogopolsky (aka Bolsey or Boolsky), the company's name having been derived from Bogopolsky's name. In 1923 he presented the Cinégraphe Bol at the Geneva fair, a reversible apparatus for taking, printing, and projecting pictures on 35 mm film. He later designed a camera for Alpa of Ballaigues in the late 1930s.

Paillard-Bolex cameras were much used by adventurers, artists, as well as nature films, documentaries, and are still favoured by many animators. Over the years, notable Bolex users and owners include: Steven Spielberg, Ridley Scott, Andy Warhol, Peter Jackson, Jonas Mekas, Jean-Luc Godard, Antoine de Saint-Exupéry, James Dean, David Lynch, Marilyn Monroe, Edmund Hillary, and Mahatma Gandhi

While some later models are electrically powered, the majority of those manufactured since the 1930s use a spring-wound clockwork power system. The 16 mm spring-wound Bolex is a popular introductory camera in film schools.

== History ==
=== Early history ===
In 1927, Ukrainian-born Jacques Bogopolsky, who specialised in building cameras in Geneva, imagined a camera for the 16 mm format (Bolex Auto-Cine A, B, C), and created the Bolex S.A. with the help of Charles Haccius, a businessman from Geneva. Charles Haccius invested 250,000 Swiss francs in the company. The society did not produce any cameras. However, the Auto Ciné A and B were produced by Longines in Saint-Imier and the projector by Stoppani in Bern. As of 1929, the Longines company no longer wished to produce the cameras.

Bolex was bought by Paillard & Cie for 350,000 Swiss francs and Jacques Bogopolsky was hired as consulting engineer for five years. Soon Paillard realized that the cameras and projectors were not in fact the exceptional products promised by their partners, and after two years Jacque Bogopolsky was no longer welcome in Sainte-Croix.

The traditional version of the story tended to present the situation rather simply: Bolex is the name of a brand produced by the Paillard company, a brand represented mainly by a camera that was invented by Jacques Boolsky (another of Jacques Bogopolsky's names). In fact, the alleged inventor of the Bolex did not invent anything about the camera, which as early as 1935 would become known under this name. With the patents sold by Boolsky proving unusable and the machines defective, Paillard had to start from scratch to invent a Bolex which had only kept the name of Boolsky's "invention". The Bolex as we know it is the invention of the engineers at Paillard.

In 1932, Marc Renaud, a young engineer, inspired by the products of Paillard and assisted by Professor Ernest Juillard, began development of the Paillard H 16 camera.

In 1935, the H 16 camera was put on the market, the 9.5 mm version followed in 1936 and the Double-8mm version in 1938. The H 16 was highly successful. Paillard-Bolex introduced the L 8 for the market of pocket 8 mm film cameras. With the postwar boom in home movie making, Paillard-Bolex continued to develop its 8 mm and 16 mm ranges with the H16 increasingly adopted by professional film makers. The company also made a successful range of high-end movie projectors for all amateur film making gauges.

In 1952, during the golden era of 3D film, Bolex offered the Bolex Stereo: a 3D stereo kit for their H16 camera and model G projectors. Several technical changes were made to the H cameras in 1954, above all an entirely different claw drive together with a laterally inverted film gate and a 170 degrees opening angle shutter. In 1956, the first H16 reflex viewfinder model was brought out. In reaction to the upcoming use of heavier varifocal or zoom lenses and the bigger synchronous electric motors attached to the body Paillard gave it a big rectangular base, with three tapped bushings replacing the original single-tap “button” base in 1963 and soon afterward a protruding 1-to-1 shaft for the ESM motor. A saddle for a 400-ft. film magazine finally allowed the H 16 to be used like professional synch-sound cameras.

Following rapid expansion, Bolex employed circa 6000 people in the 1960s. In 1965, Kodak introduced the Super 8 mm format. Paillard Bolex was slow to introduce a Super 8 camera although they quickly modified the 18-5 Auto 8 mm projector for Super 8 as the 18-5 L. At about this time(1966), the Bolex 16 Pro Camera was introduced to compete with the Arriflex 16 BL camera, as a technically advanced professional camera more suited for television use than the H16. Nevertheless, the H 16 Standard camera was made until the last days of 1969. The H 16 and H 8 standard models afford the rackover critical focusing feature that had been first introduced with the Bell & Howell Standard camera in 1912. In 1971, Bolex released an even more affordable option: the Bolex 280 Macrozoom Super 8. The new model featured wide-range manual zoom and the ability to focus at close distances. It shot at 2 filming speeds, 18 and 24 fps, and was able to expose single frames. Unlike the classic mechanical Bolex Cameras, the 280 Macrozoom needed 5 1.5 volt batteries to operate.

=== Company restructuring ===
Effective January 1, 1970 Paillard sold the Bolex division to Eumig of Vienna. In 1971, Eumig rationalized the Super 8 range, and Super 8 equipment production in Switzerland was discontinued. The Bolex product brand was retained while being manufactured in Eumig or Chinon factories. The H16 cameras were still made in Switzerland.

=== Since 1981 ===
In 1981, Eumig went into liquidation and Bolex was bought by René Ueter who set up Bolex International in 1982. Bolex International no longer serially manufactures its cameras, but does repair 16 mm and Super 16 cameras for customers on special order to this day.

== Legacy ==
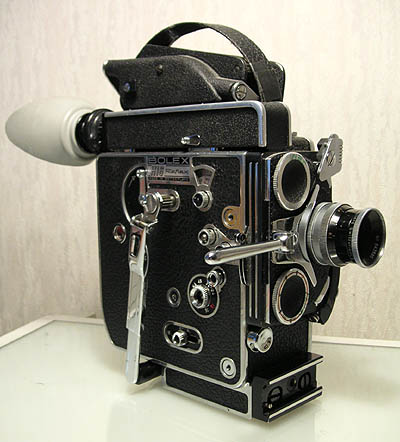
A Bolex H16 REX-5 spring-wound clockwork 16 mm camera

Many directors began their careers shooting on Paillard-Bolex Cameras, including Ridley Scott, David Lynch, Jonas Mekas, Peter Jackson, Terry Gilliam, Will Vinton, Maya Deren, Steven Spielberg and Spike Lee, inspiring the use of Paillard-Bolex as a beginner's camera in film schools worldwide.

Jules Schulback, a furrier and maker of home movies, filmed, with his 16-millimeter Bolex camera, Marilyn Monroe's white skirt billowing from a "gust" up through a subway grate, in a publicity stunt for The Seven Year Itch, around the corner from his apartment, in New York.

Bolex cameras have become an enduring symbol of cinema, and their Swiss-made production has contributed to the country's reputation for quality manufacturing.

It has been used in various advertising as a symbol. In 2015, it appeared in an Omega ad with George Clooney. Also in 2015, various Bolex models, including P2/8 mm and Super Zoom/8 mm, appeared in a campaign for Chanel eyewear with Kristen Stewart.

=== H 16 ===
The Bolex H 16 camera played a central role in the work of many avant-garde filmmakers from the 1940s through to the 1970s because of its precision and light weight, robustness and range of facilities, the high quality of its optics, especially the zoom lenses, and its simple operation, which made possible an infinite combination of creative cinematographic choices.

The Bolex H 16 is probably the camera which most influenced a generation of experimental and documentary/ethnographic filmmakers.

== Technical aspects of the Bolex ==
There are several different Bolex models. The camera's film capacity is variable dependent on model. For example, a 400-ft magazine (on the Rex 5 – or converted Rex 3 or 4) can be attached to the top of the camera. From the beginning, it offered automatic film threading, a clutch for disengaging the drive spring in order to crank the film by hand forward and backwards unlimited, and a cut-off turret disc that is not wider than the camera body in center position. Stepless speed control was available between 8 and 64 frames per second. Early cameras have a 190 degrees opening angle shutter. A few years after their introduction, the H cameras could be equipped with an accurate single-frame counter. That accessory was incorporated into all H camera models since 1946.

As with a still reflex camera, the Bolex RX has a viewfinder, which allows the filmmaker to view what they are filming. This specific viewfinder is made up of a double prism that deflects 20 percent of the light going through the lens into the viewfinder.

The Paillard-Bolex H 16 usually has a turret for three C-mount lenses. Often, the camera was provided with a 16mm Switar or Yvar, a 25mm Switar or Yvar and the third lens was often a 75mm Yvar or 50mm Switar. Only lenses with the designation "RX" in 50 mm or less can be used on the RX models. RX corrected lenses were also manufactured by Schneider, Berthiot, Angénieux, and Rodenstock. The single lens port H 16 M(arine) was made in conjunction with the first underwater housing. A second, later marine housing was made for the electric drive models.

Some people had their H 16 camera converted to Super 16. This format is highly suited to telecine conversion, as Super 16 is close to the 16:9 electronic image format. Some conversions were more successful than others. Bolex (latterly) did offer a factory Super 16mm camera. This has the appropriate markings in the viewfinder and the film gate is machined and polished to professional standards.

Bolex did have a foray into purely professional cameras with the Bolex Pro 16. Again, they decided against a registration pin for mechanical simplicity, to keep the camera as quiet as possible for sync-sound filming. This camera was only offered with 400 ft magazine capacity.

== Notable models: cameras and projectors ==
Swiss made with the year of introduction except for the Italian Silma made SM8

=== Jacques Bogopolsky and Charles Haccius ===
Models produced by Longines

- Auto Cine (1925)
- Auto Cine B (1926)
- Auto Cine C (not released)

=== Paillard Bolex ===
- H 16 (1935)
- H 9 (1936)
- Model G Projectors (1936)
- H 8S (1936)
- L 8 (1942)
- M8 and M8R Projectors (1949)
- B 8 (1952)
- C 8 (1958)
- B 8L (1952)
- H 16 Reflex (1956)
- D 8L (1958)
- S221 Projector (1960)
- P1 (1961)
- 18-5 Projector (1961)
- C 8SL (1961)
- D 8LA (1961)
- P2 (1961)
- K1 (1962)
- H 8RX (1963)
- P3 (1963)
- S1 (1964)
- K2 (1964)
- P4 (1965)
- H 16 RX-5 (1966)
- Bolex 16 Pro (1966)
- 150 Super (1966)
- SM8 Projector (made by Silma) (1967)
- S321 Projector (1968)
- 7.5 Macrozoom (1969)
- H 16 SB, SBM (1970)
- 155 Macro-zoom (1970)
- 160 Macro-zoom (1970)
- H 16 EBM (1971)
- H 16 EL (1975)

=== Bolex Eumig ===
- 660 Macro-zoom (1976)
- 680 Macro-zoom (1978)

== Notable users ==
=== Artists ===
- Andy Warhol, American artist, film director, and producer
- Fernand Léger, French painter, sculptor, and filmmaker
- Hans Richter (artist), German painter, graphic artist, avant-gardist, film-experimenter and producer.
- Jean Cocteau, French poet, playwright, novelist, designer, filmmaker, visual artist and critic
- Paul Sharits, visual artist, best known for his work in experimental, or avant-garde filmmaking, particularly what became known as the structural film movement
- Robert Breer, American experimental filmmaker, painter, and sculptor

=== Filmmakers ===
- Andrew Noren, Andrew Noren was an American avant-garde filmmaker
- Brian de Palma, American film director and screenwriter
- Brian Yuzna, Filipino-born American producer, director, and writer
- Bruce Baillie, American experimental filmmaker
- David Attenborough, British television executive, presenter and natural history producer
- David Lynch, American director
- George Kuchar, American underground film director and video artist, known for his "low-fi" aesthetic
- Gregory Markopoulos, American experimental filmmaker
- James Broughton, American poet and poetic filmmaker
- Jean-Luc Godard, French-Swiss film director, screenwriter and film critic
- Jonas Mekas, Lithuanian-American filmmaker, poet, and artist who has often been called "the godfather of American avant-garde cinema".
- Kenneth Anger, Kenneth Anger is an American underground experimental filmmaker, actor and author
- Marie Menken, American experimental filmmaker, painter, and socialite.
- Maya Deren, Ukrainian-born American experimental filmmaker and important promoter of the avant-garde in the 1940s and 1950s.
- Peter Jackson, New Zealand film director, screenwriter, and film producer
- Quentin Tarantino, American filmmaker and actor
- Ridley Scott, English filmmaker
- Robert Beavers, American experimental filmmaker
- Spike Lee, American film director, producer, writer, actor, and professor
- Stan Brakhage, James Stanley Brakhage, better known as Stan Brakhage, was an American non-narrative filmmaker. He is considered to be one of the most important figures in 20th-century experimental film.
- Steven Spielberg, American filmmaker. He is considered one of the founding pioneers of the New Hollywood era and one of the most popular directors and producers in film history.
- Terry Gilliam, American-born British screenwriter, film director, animator, actor, comedian and former member of the Monty Python comedy troupe
- Will Vinton, American animator and filmmaker
- Wim Wenders, German filmmaker, playwright, author, and photographer. He is a major figure in New German Cinema.
- Yashaddai Owens, whose debut film Jimmy, about James Baldwin, "is working to capture Promethean lightning in a Bolex."

=== Actors ===
- James Dean, American actor
- Marlene Dietrich, German-American actress and singer

=== Intellectuals ===
- Antoine de Saint-Exupéry, French writer, poet, aristocrat, journalist and pioneering aviator. He became a laureate of several of France's highest literary awards and also won the United States National Book Award.
- Mahatma Gandhi, Indian lawyer, anti-colonial nationalist, and political ethicist

=== Explorers ===
- Edmund Hillary, New Zealand mountaineer, explorer, and philanthropist. On May 29, 1953, Hillary and Sherpa mountaineer Tenzing Norgay became the first climbers confirmed to have reached the summit of Mount Everest.
- Haroun Tazieff, Polish, Belgian and French volcanologist and geologist. He was a famous cinematographer of volcanic eruptions and lava flows, and the author of several books on volcanoes.
- Jacques Piccard, Swiss oceanographer and engineer, known for having developed underwater submarines for studying ocean currents.
- Thor Heyerdahl, Norwegian adventurer and ethnographer with a background in zoology, botany and geography. Heyerdahl is notable for his Kon-Tiki expedition in 1947, in which he sailed 8,000 km across the Pacific Ocean in a hand-built raft from South America to the Tuamotu Islands.
- Richard Proenneke, an American naturalist lived alone in Alaska for over thirty years and recorded his time there on Bolex cameras.

== Documentaries ==
There are two documentaries about the history of the Bolex camera. Beyond The Bolex, a biographical film about Bolex founder Jacques Bogopolsky (later anglicized to Bolsey), is directed by his great-grand daughter Alyssa Bolsey, and features an in-depth look at the original notes, schematics, prototypes of Bolex A and B cameras A second project that is currently in production, is being undertaken by Swiss director Alexandre Favre. Bolex was used exclusively to film Teeny Little Super Guy for Sesame Street in 1982.

== Digital Bolex D16 ==
In 2012, Cinemeridian, Inc. licensed the named Bolex from Bolex International to create a digital Super 16mm cinema camera called the Digital Bolex D16. Digital Bolex announced their collaboration with Bolex via the Kickstarter crowdfunding platform on March 12, 2012 at the SXSW Film Festival where they had a trade show booth.

== See also ==
- List of photographic equipment makers
- List of companies of Switzerland

== Sources ==
- Perret, Thomas; Cosandey, Roland (2013). Paillard, Bolex, Boolsky: la caméra de Paillard & Cie SA, le cinéma de Jacques Boolsky (in French). Yverdon-les-Bains, Switzerland: Editions de la Thièle. ISBN 978-2-8283-0044-9.
- Alden, Andrew Vivian (1998). A Bolex History: Cameras, Projectors and Accessories. A2 Time Based Graphics. ISBN 978-0-9533075-0-0.
- Alden, Andrew Vivian (1998). Bolex Bible: Everything You Ever Wanted to Know But Were Afraid to Ask : an Essential Guide to Buying and Using Bolex H16 Cameras. A2 Time Based Graphics. ISBN 978-0-9533075-1-7.
- Alden, Andrew Vivian (2001). Time-lapse and Stop-motion Using the Bolex H16: (or Click-wait and Click-fiddle). A2 Time Based Graphics. ISBN 978-0-9533075-2-4.
- Paillard présente ses caméras, ses projecteurs. Flugblatt 223 × 276 mm, März 1938
- Paillard-Bolex Cine Cameras, the Cine Cameras for the ‘Professional Amateur’. CINEX Ltd, London; 24 S., 6" × 9"
- Movie Makers, Amateur Cinema League ed. 1926–1953
- Heinrich Freytag: Schmalfilmen mit Bolex 8. Neuaufl. "Die Schönen Bücher Strache", Stuttgart 1962 (deutsch)
- Gerald Reynolds Sharp: Bolex 8mm. Guide. 5. Aufl. Focal Press, London 1962, ISBN 0-240-44722-0
- Laurent Tissot: E. Paillard & Cie SA. Une entreprise vaudoise de petite mécanique (1920–1945). Entreprise familiale, diversification industrielle et innovation technologique. Delval, Cousset (Fribourg) 1987, ISBN 2-88147-036-X.
- "Bolex et le cinéma amateur en Suisse". Collaboration UNIL + Cinémathèque suisse (in French). University of Lausanne.
- "Paillard - Bolex: il ne reste que le mythe". SWI swissinfo.ch (in French). 12 February 2004. Archived from the original on 7 March 2016.
- "Paillard, Bolex, history, shutter, prism;". small movies. Pittsburgh, PA: Citynet, Inc. Archived from the original on 6 June 1997.
- TECHNÈS: The International Research Partnership on Cinema Techniques and Technology (17 May 2019). "Communication Vincent Sorrel (U. de Grenoble-Alpes, U. de Lausanne) - Collection Lemai". youtube. "XI - BOLEX ET LA « MÉCANIQUE SUISSE» Présidente de séance : Viva Paci (Université du Québec à Montréal) Communication de Vincent Sorrel, « Filmer avec doigté. Corps, appareils, expressivité » technes.org"
- "La machine Bolex, les horizons amateurs du cinéma". Cinémathèque des Pays de Savoie et de l'Ain (in French). 2020. PDF
