= Peter Bennetts =

Australian artist

Peter "Bruce" Bennetts (born 25 March 1967) is an Australian visual artist specialising in architectural photography.

== Biography ==
Born in Sydney, Bennetts spent his childhood in Perth before moving to Melbourne in 1984 to study photography at RMIT University. After graduating, he worked within environmental reporting, contributing images to Lonely Planet and in conjunction with Tony Wheeler co-authored the book, Time & Tide: The Islands of Tuvalu.

Bennetts architectural photographs include: Casa da Música by Office of Metropolitan Architecture, MAXXI – National Museum of the 21st Century Arts by Zaha Hadid Architects, Barcelona Pavilion by Mies van der Rohe, Torre Agbar by Jean Nouvel., Melbourne Rectangular Stadium by Cox Architecture, Jane Foss Russell Building by John Wardle and the Australian Centre for Contemporary Art (ACCA) by Wood Marsh.

In 2008, Bennetts produced a solo exhibition titled Recent Architecture Photography, which included portraits of Bill Henson, Jean Nouvel, Peter Cook and Greg Lynn, alongside his commercial architectural work and environmental reporting of Tuvalu.

In 2005, Bennetts co-founded the Falls Creek Alpine Resort Artist's Camp with David Hugh Thomas. The camp is an annual event for contemporary artists at the Falls Creek Alpine Resort.

== Publications ==
=== Magazines ===
Bennetts has written mazagine articles for Wallpaper (magazine), Frame (magazine), Mark (magazine), Dwell (magazine), Domus (magazine), Casabella, Architectural Review, Architecture Australia and Artichoke.

=== Co-authored ===
- (2001) Time & Tide, The Islands of Tuvalu (ISBN 978-1864503425)

=== Contributor ===
- (2004) New Conversations with an Old Landscape: Landscape Architecture in Contemporary Australia (ISBN 978-1876907655)
- (2004) The Phaidon Atlas of World Architecture (ISBN 978-0714843124)
- (2005) The Travel Book: A Journey Through Every Country in the World (ISBN 978-1741046298)
- (2008) Phaidon Atlas of 21st Century World Architecture (ISBN 978-0714848747)
- (2009) Lonely Planet The Cities Book (ISBN 978-1741798876)
- (2010) Lonely Planet The Travel Book (ISBN 978-1741792119)

== Exhibitions ==
=== Solo ===
- (2008) Recent Architecture Photography

=== Contributor ===
- (2007) The Trouble with the Weather: A Southern Response

== Equipment ==
Peter Bennetts utilises an Alpa camera with Rodenstock GmbH and Schneider Kreuznach lenses paired with a Leaf (Israeli company) Aptus II 10 medium format digital camera back.

== Awards ==
- (2004) ASLA Professional Awards, Communications Award of Merit
