= Alpa =

Swiss camera manufacturer

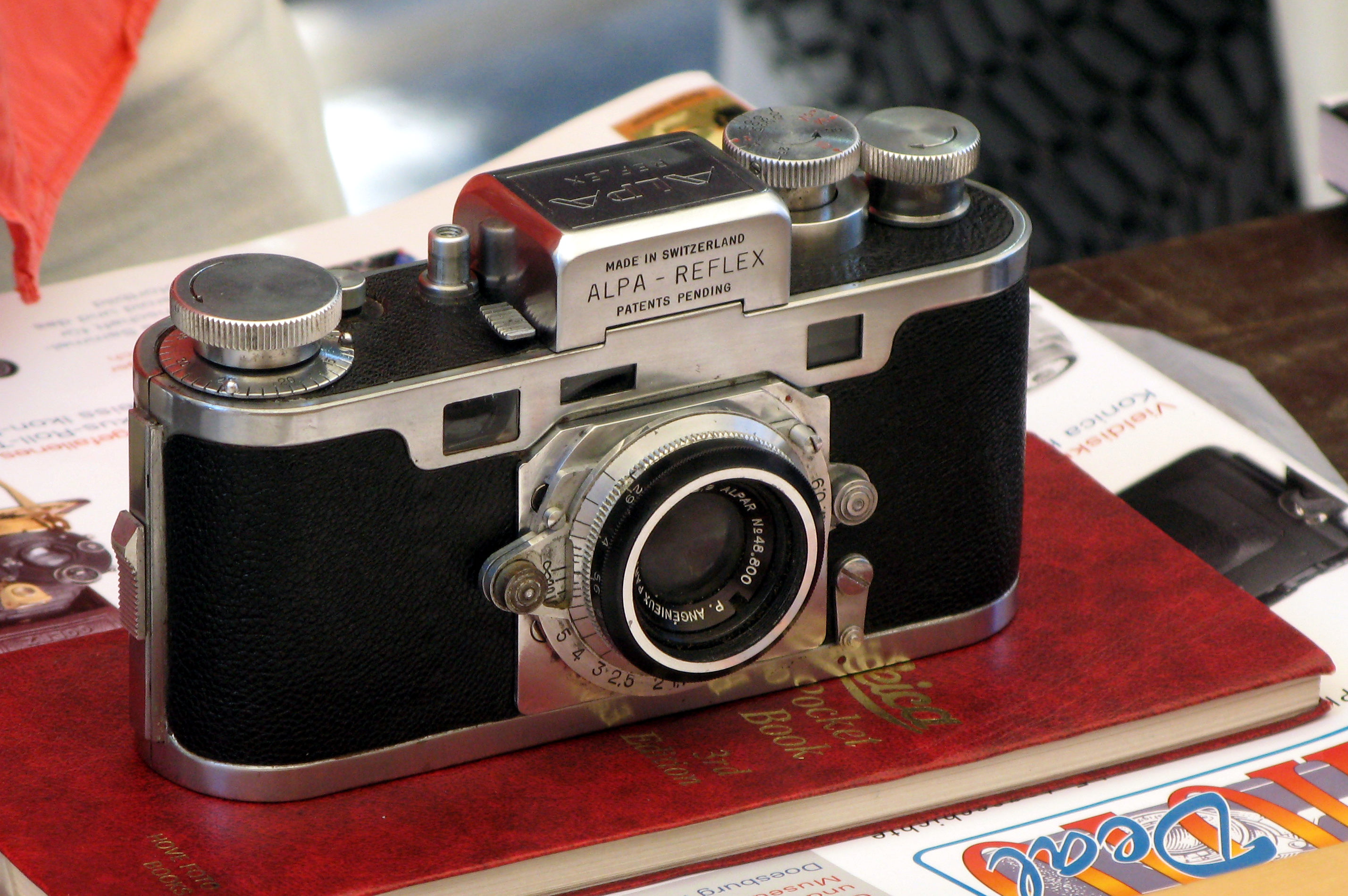
The Alpa Reflex

Alpa is a designer and manufacturer company which designs high-end medium-format cameras (Website alpa.ch). The current owners bought the company name after the bankruptcy of the original company, known for producing 35 mm SLR cameras.

== History ==
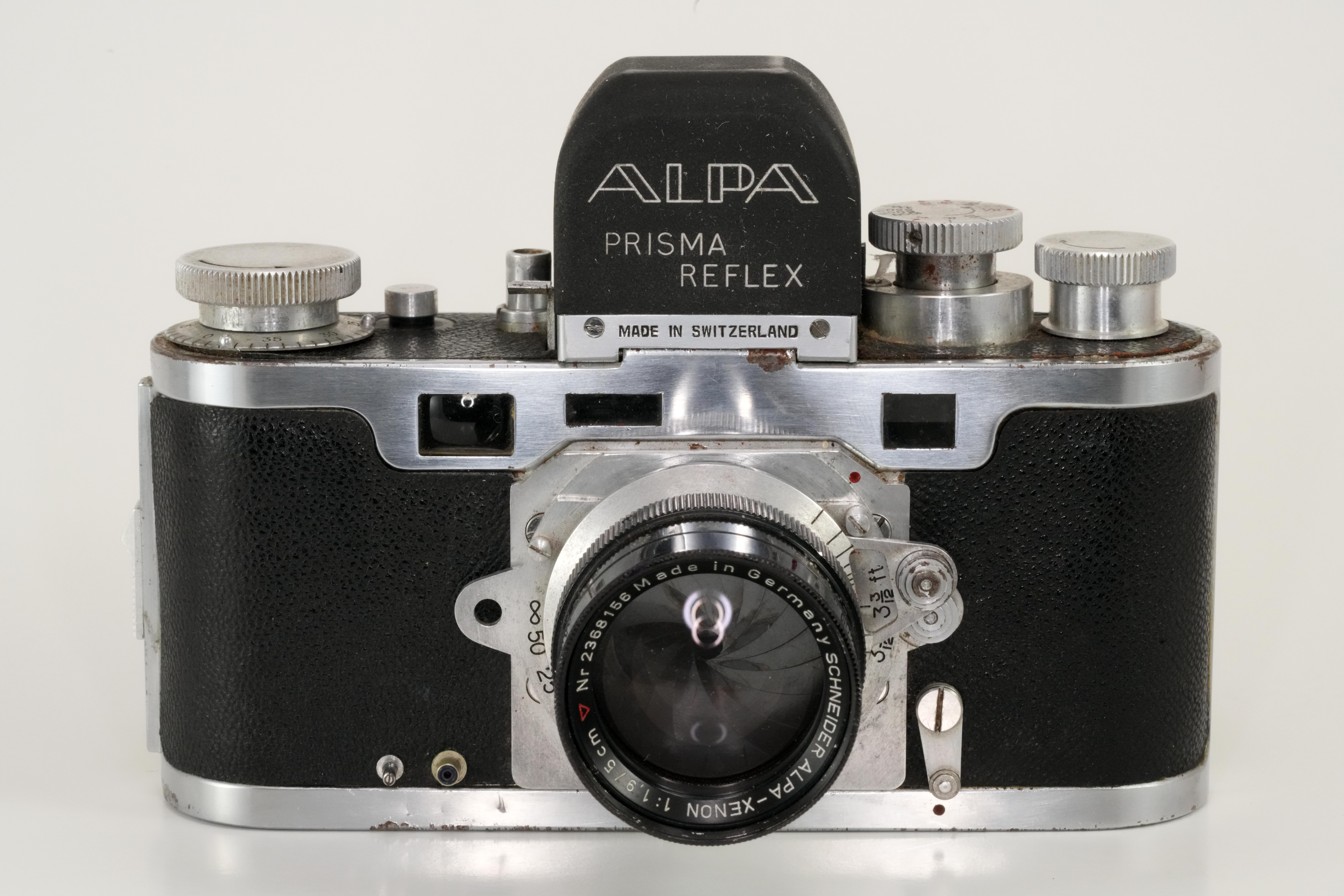
Alpa Prisma-Reflex

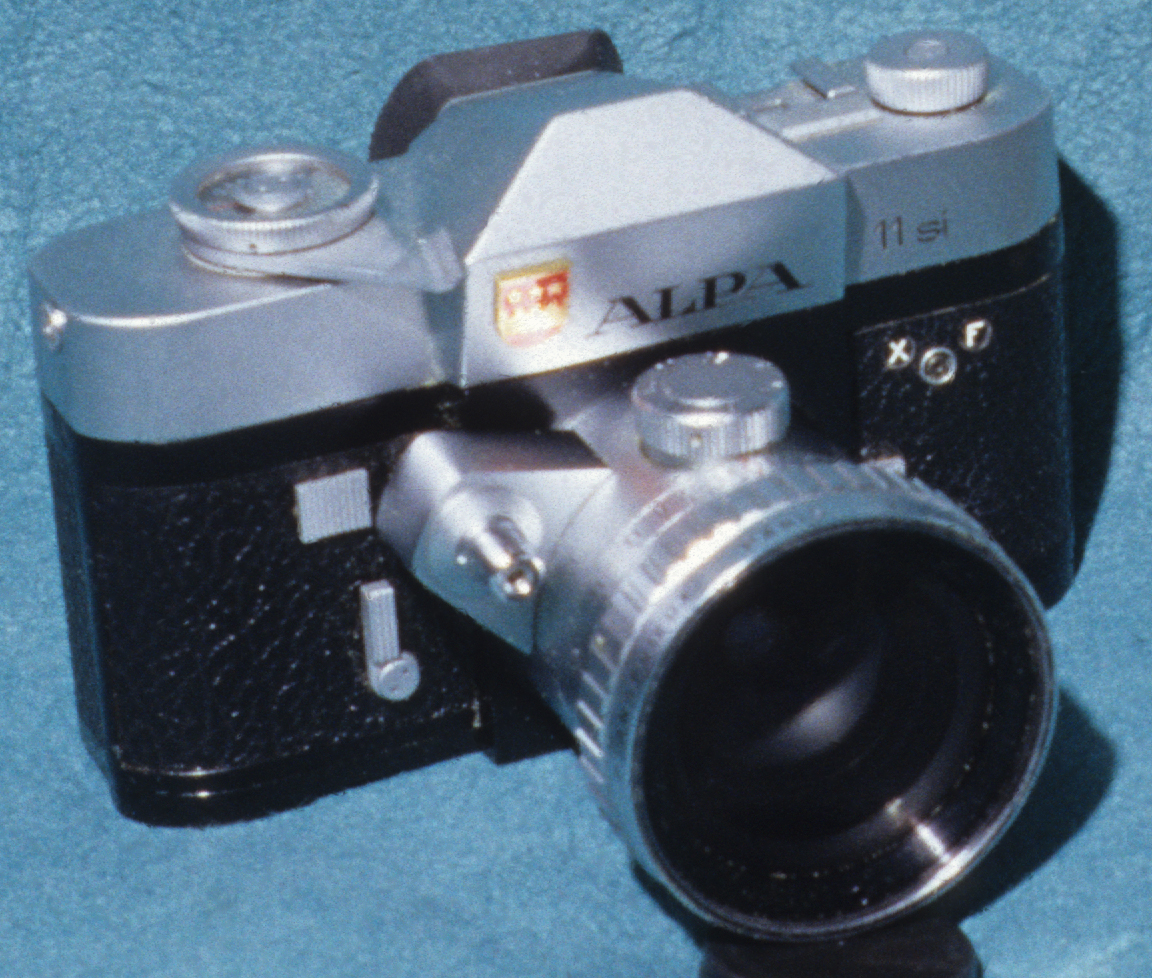
ALPA 11si Chrome 28mm f3.5mm Angenieux lens Ser#64064 Purchased 1991 Photo by James Eager

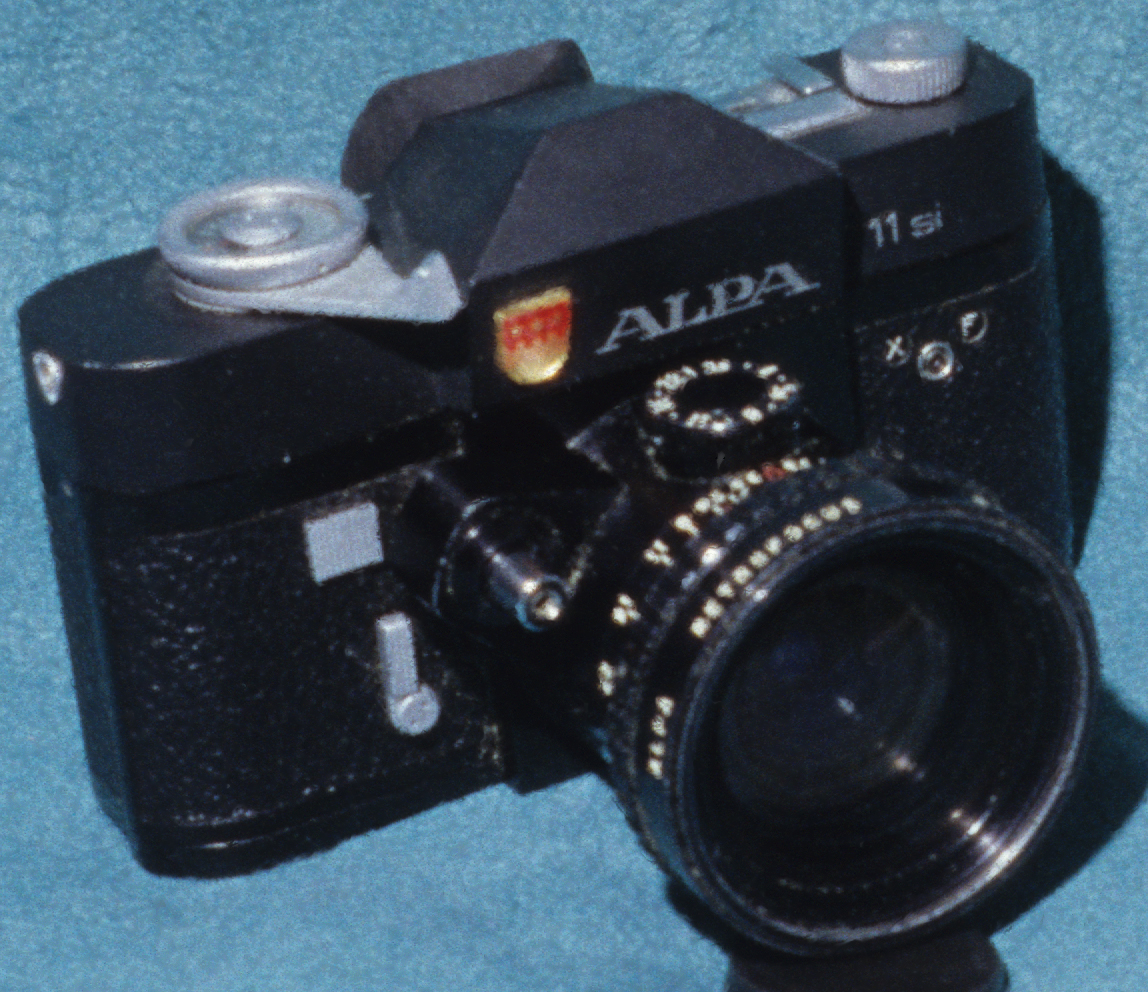
ALPA 11si Black 24mm f3.5mm Angenieux lens Ser#64205 Purchased 1991 Photo by James Eager

Alpa was an offshoot of the Pignons S.A. company, which made a particular part (pinions) for Swiss watches. They made high-end, all-metal 35mm cameras with a similar high-end but smaller-volume market to Germany's Leica, Contax, and Rolleiflex. In the late 1930s, Pignons invited engineer Jacques Bolsky to design a camera for them. This he did with the Alpa-Reflex in the 1940s. In true Swiss fashion, each camera was individually crafted. Thus, production was low, but quality and prices were high. Even these days, collectible Alpa cameras can fetch quite a high auction price. It is estimated that as few as 40,000 cameras of all models of Alpa were made during the company's 40-year history. Allowing for certain gaps, the serial numbers would support that, as the last cameras made (in about 1990) carried serial numbers of only 64,xxx.

There is an ongoing question concerning which camera company was first with such innovations as the quick-return mirror, through-the-lens metering, cells in prism housings and the bayonet lens mount. Alpa was a contender for being first with each of these innovations and several others.

Unfortunately, Alpa did not have the resources to keep up with the technological advances that the mainstream camera companies were introducing in the 1970s and sales began to decline. It is not clear whether the lack of technological "innovation" was due to lack of money, or actually a choice made by the company against the automation brought about by other companies.

A more popularly priced "Alpa" camera made in Japan by Chinon was introduced. It used M42 screw mount lenses, but it did not sell very well, partly because the premium Alpa lenses could not be used on it. (The Si2000 used the M42 Screw mount, the Si3000 used the Pentax K mount.) Neither model was popular and they are not considered true Alpas by collectors. Some feel the Japanese Alpa was a mistake that hurt the company.

The Kern Macro Switar lens was a 50 mm lens at F1.8 or F1.9. It was an apochromat, and is still highly regarded as possibly the best standard lens ever offered. Other apochromats offered by Alpa included the 100 mm F2 and 150 mm F2.8 Kinoptik lenses.

A total of six different models of motor drive and magazine back were reputed to have been made. Two models each for the 9d, 10d, and 11 series cameras, one full-frame, one half-frame. Estimates of less than 250 were made. The example in the photo is full frame, 11 series.

Unlike Nikon magazine backs, the Alpa ones were designed to allow for an entire 100-foot roll of 35 mm film to be inserted at once, and to allow for the operator to open the takeup-side individually to cut off a portion of the film in a changing bag for processing without unloading the rest of the roll. The motor drive resembled some oil pumps in that the motor rocked a lever back and forth to shoot the normal trigger after a second gear moved the normal shutter cocking mechanism. In actual use, photos can be shot at approximately 1-second intervals.

Both wall transformers and NiCad battery packs were originally offered. The example unit has a wall transformer, but only photographs of the battery packs may survive.

The company retained the same lens mount on the Swiss made cameras from 1942 until they ended production. The back focus of the body was the thinnest of any 35 mm camera, and as a result, it was possible to make adapters to use lenses designed for almost any other 35 mm SLR on an Alpa. Adapters offered included Exakta, M42 (automatic diaphragm and manual), Nikon (auto and manual), Leicaflex, T-mount, and Contax. Other adapters included one to allow mounting Alpa lenses to C-mount movie cameras and another to mount the Alpa bodies to a microscope. Alpa did not make their own lenses, and sourced them through some of the best lens makers—Angenieux, Kern, Kinoptik, Schneider, and others. They were the only company to guarantee the optical quality of the lenses they sold. The clearness of the pentaprism in the Alpa models, and the use of "rings" of different surfaces in the eyepiece of the 11 series especially made them a great choice for using on a T-mount, attached to large telescopes. Coupled with the manual mirror raise switch, even the vibration of the mirror slap was removed.

The company can no longer compete with manufacturers from outside Europe. The fatal blow, however, is delivered by problems within the company. Pignons SA declares bankruptcy in 1990. The last ALPA model produced by Pignons SA is the ALPA 11.

By February 29, 1996, Capaul & Weber, Zurich, at long last acquired the worldwide rights to the brand-name ALPA. The new owners aim is to continue the tradition of quality established with the classic 35-mm ALPA reflex cameras and to enter into the field of medium-format cameras. On 18 April 1996 the internet domain alpa.ch was registered and soon the first website went online. At Photokina 1998 the first two ALPA 12 models are shown. Both were for medium-format: ALPA 12 WA (Wide Angle) and ALPA 12 SWA (Shift Wide Angle). Since then ALPA became one of the leading companies for technical cameras in medium format (first analog/film up to 6x9 and nowadays primarily with high-end digital backs).

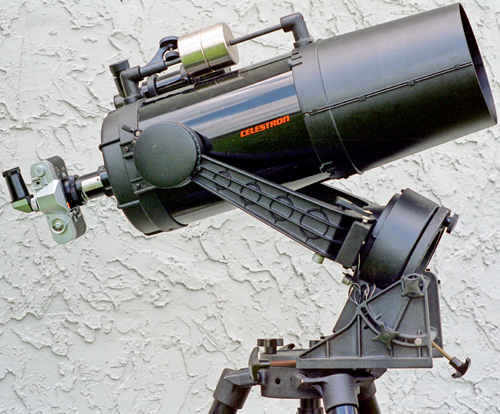
Alpa 11si chrome with right angle viewfinder. Mounted on a Celestron Super C8+ with starbright coatings. Note that photos taken like the shuttle on the right are done blind by the photographer. Photo taken with an Alpa 11el, by James Eager

Space shuttle Columbia, STS-35 from the causeway viewing area. Photo taken with the unit pictured at the left of this page (Celestron 2023 mm f10) by James Eager

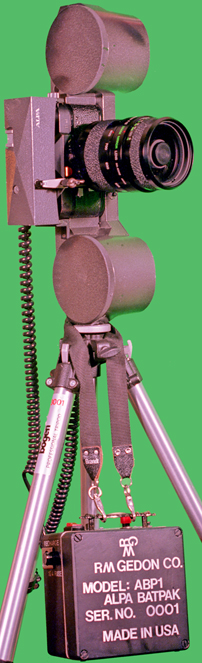
Alpa 11el (with 11e meter) Black. Mounted in a 100-foot Magazine back, with motor drive. Lens is 500–800 Mirror Zoom. Battery pack below is custom made for this setup. Photo taken with an Alpa 11el, by James Eager

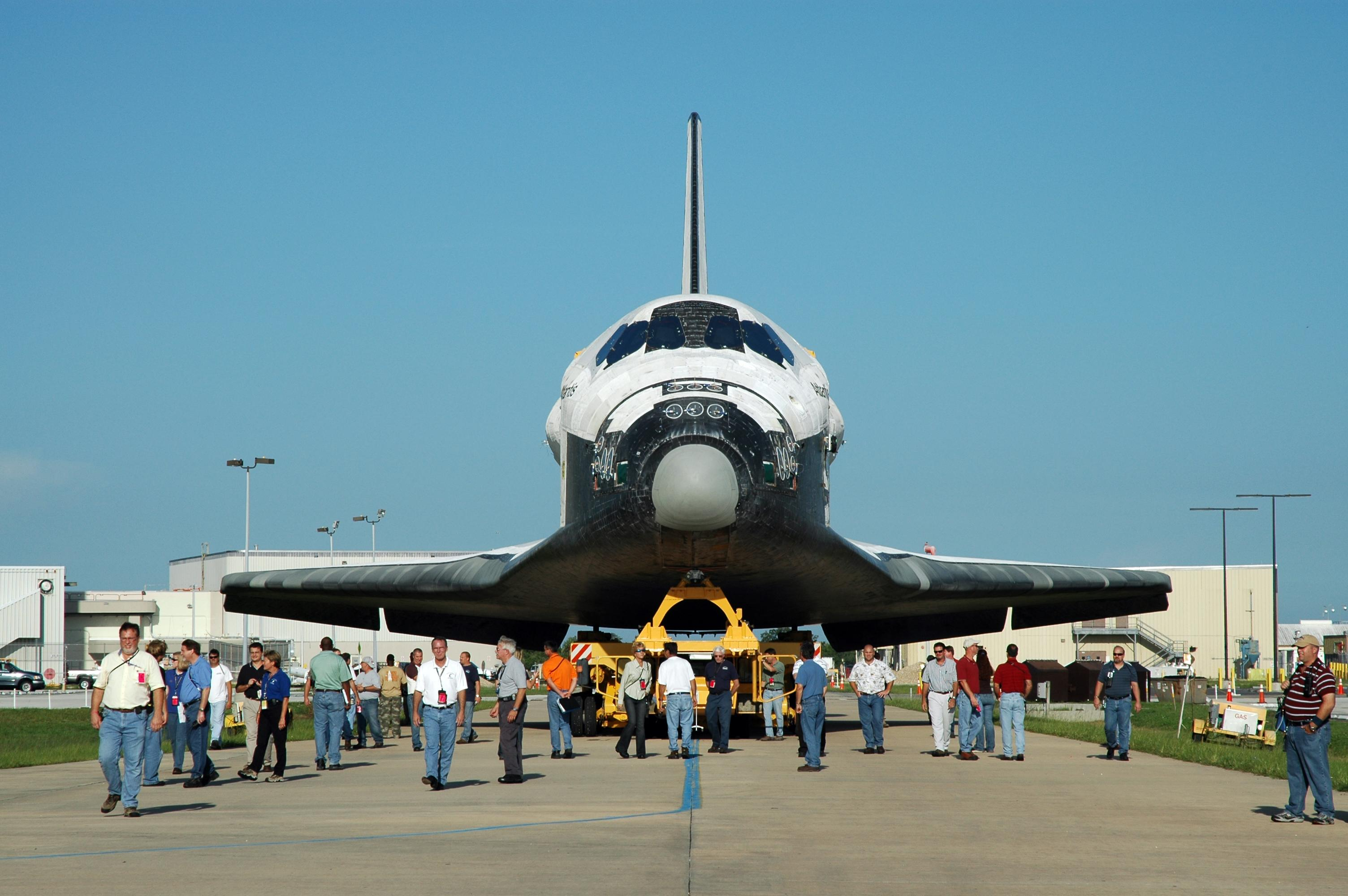
Space shuttle Atlantis, STS-42 from the causeway viewing area. Photo taken with the unit pictured at the left of this page (magazine back and motor drive 500–800mm mirror lens, f12) by James Eager

== Alpa reborn ==
The new "Alpa" is a brand of the Swiss company Capaul & Weber, and is used for minimalistic medium format cameras using specifically mounted lenses from Rodenstock, Schneider and Zeiss.

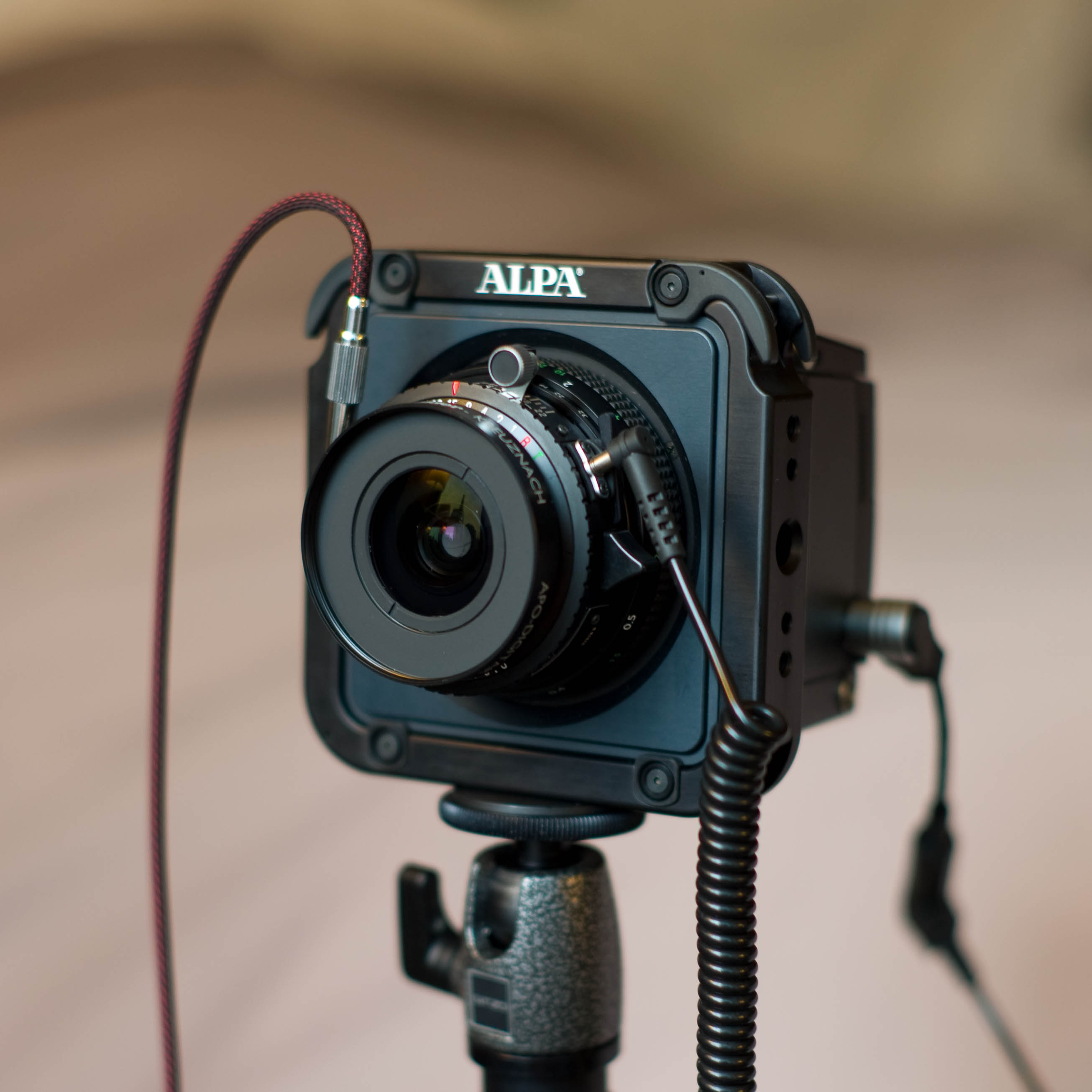
Basic Alpa with Schneider Apo-Digitar 5.6/35 mm XL, Copal 0

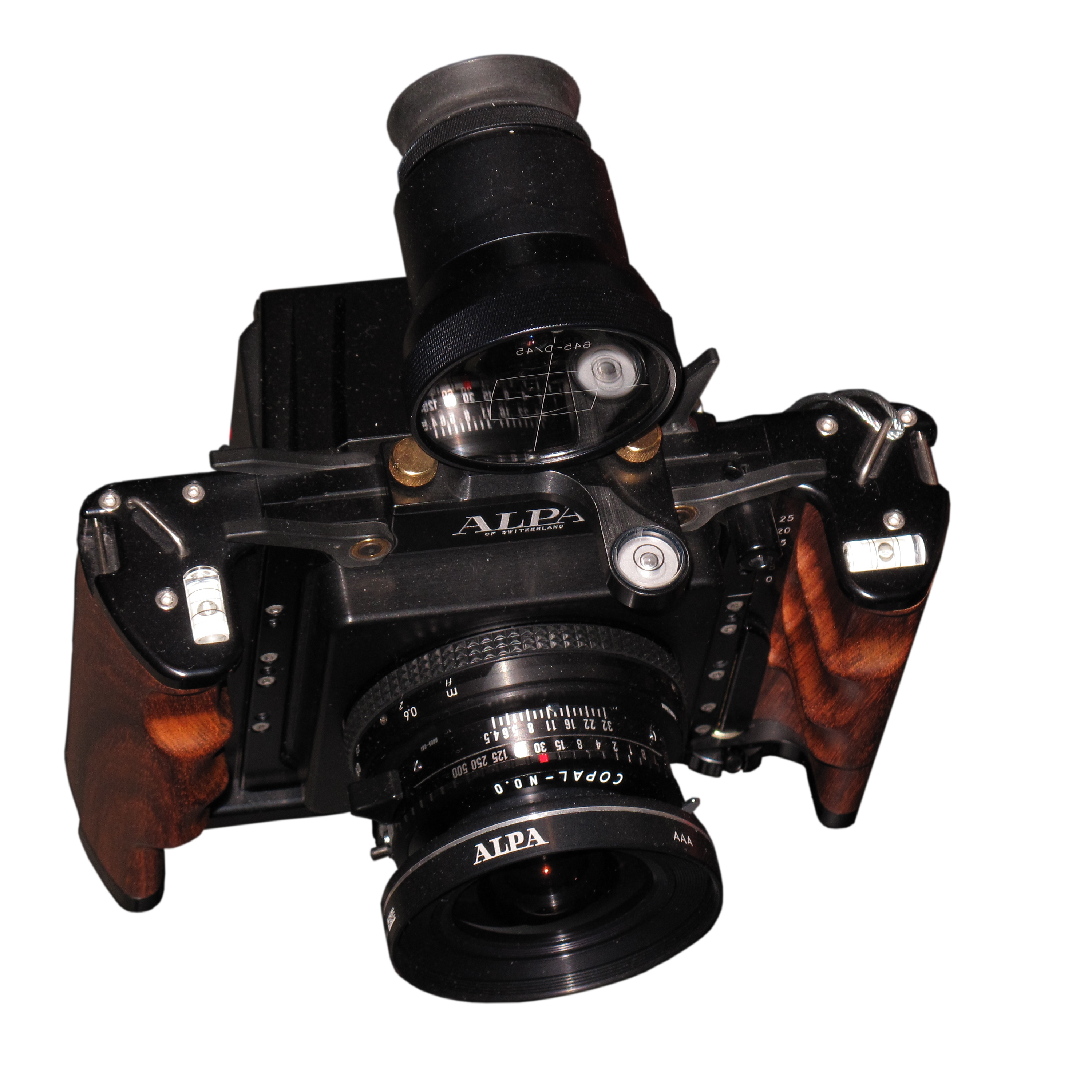
Digital Alpa camera

== See also ==
- List of photographic equipment makers
