= Hell Bent for Letters =

Studio album by BlöödHag
- Released: May 23, 2006
- Recorded: 2006
- Genre: Death metal
- Length: 27:17
- Label: Alternative Tentacles
- Producer: Jeff McNulty

BlöödHag chronology
Necrotic Bibliophelia (2004)	Hell Bent for Letters (2006)

Professional ratings
Review scores
Source	Rating
Allmusic	3.5/5 stars

Hell Bent for Letters is the second full-length album by the Seattle, Washington-based literary-metal band BlöödHag. It is their first release for Jello Biafra's Alternative Tentacles label. It was produced and recorded by the band's guitarist, Dr. J.M. McNulty, under his less formal name of Jeff McNulty.

The album title is a pun on the Judas Priest album Hell Bent for Leather. One reviewer described the album by suggesting, "[i]magine history class taught by Gwar, and it's still not quite enough to capture the essence of what BlöödHag bring to the table."

As with their past back catalog, all of the songs on Hell Bent for Letters honor various science fiction and similar genre writers, including Douglas Adams, Edgar Allan Poe, and Franz Kafka.

== Track listing ==
1. "Gene Wolfe"
2. "Robert Silverberg"
3. "Douglas Adams"
4. "James Blish"
5. "Anne McCaffrey"
6. "Orson Scott Card"
7. "Iain M. Banks"
8. "Edgar Allan Poe"
9. "Philip Jose Farmer"
10. "Michael Swanwick"
11. "Frederik Pohl"
12. "Thomas M. Disch"
13. "Greg Bear"
14. "Franz Kafka"
15. "Madeleine L'Engle"
16. "Jack Womack"

== Personnel ==
- Prof. J.B. Stratton - vocals
- Sir Zachary Orgel - bass
- Dr. J.M. McNulty - guitars, "additional sounds" (as Jeff McNulty)
- Amb. Brent Carpenter - drums
- Jeremy Enigk - keyboards

== Production ==
- Jeff McNulty - producer, engineer
- Eric Carnell - assistant engineer
- Jon Ervie - assistant engineer
- "Greedy" Greg Williamson - mix engineer
