= Thomas Bennett (cricketer) =

Australian cricketer (1866–1942)

Personal information
- Born: 11 October 1866; Littlehampton, South Australia
- Died: 26 December 1942 (aged 76); Northfield, South Australia

Domestic team information
- Years: Team
- 1894/95: South Australia

Career statistics
Competition	First-class
Matches	1
Runs scored	5
Batting average	2.50
100s/50s	0/0
Top score	5
Catches/stumpings	0/–
- Source: ESPNcricinfo, 24 April 2018

Thomas Bennett (11 October 1866 – 26 December 1942) was an Australian cricketer. He played one first-class match for South Australia in February 1895, losing to New South Wales at the Sydney Cricket Ground.

He was the uncle of West Adelaide goalsneak Edgar Bennetts.
