= Bent (given name) =

Bent is a masculite given name. It is a short form of the name Berndt, Bernhard or an old Danish form of the name Beinkt, which is an Old Swedish short form of Benedikt. Notable people with this given name include:

- Bent Fabric (1924–2020), Danish composer
- Bent Flyvbjerg (born 1952), Danish economic geographer
- Bent Hegna (born 1959), Norwegian politician
- Bent Larsen (1935–2010), Danish chess grandmaster
- Bent Mejding (1937–2024), Danish actor
- Bent Melchior (1929–2021), Danish rabbi

== See also ==
- Bent (surname)
