= Jevene Bent =

Jamaican police officer

- Born: Bent
- Citizenship: Jamaica
- Occupation: Police officer
- Employer: Jamaica Constabulary Force
- Known for: Commissioner of Corrections

Jevene Bent is a former Jamaican police officer who was deputy commissioner of the Jamaica Constabulary Force from 2003 to 2013, the first woman to hold this rank. She later served as Commissioner of Corrections from 2013 to 2014.

Bent grew up in a small farming community near Southfield, Jamaica. She initially trained as a teacher, attending the Church Teachers' College in Mandeville; she raised and sold pigs in order to fund her education. In 1976, Bent cut short her teaching career to join the Jamaica Constabulary Force (JCF). She was one of the first female recruits to train alongside her male counterparts – previously, women who joined the force had been placed into separate female-only units. Bent's first posting was to Half Way Tree, Kingston. She was eventually promoted to assistant commissioner of police, in that capacity serving as an area commander with responsibility for multiple parishes and up to 900 officers.

In May 2003, Bent was promoted to deputy commissioner of police (DCP), the second-highest rank in the JCF. She was the first woman to hold the position, and according to some sources was the first female DCP in the entire Caribbean. Bent spent periods in charge of the training branch and the administrative and support services branch, and also acted as commissioner of police on multiple occasions. She retired from the JFC in May 2013. The following month, Bent was appointed by the Public Service Commission as the new Commissioner of Corrections, placing her in charge of the Department of Correctional Services. As commissioner, she advocated for the use of community service orders for low-level offenders, in order to save resources, and also introduced new rehabilitation programs for juvenile offenders. Bent resigned in June 2014, apparently due to a budgetary dispute. In response, the Jamaica Federation of Corrections (the prison employees' union) called on her to rescind her resignation, with the federation's chairman describing her as "the best commissioner the department has had in 12 years."
