= Paul Bent =

English cricketer

Personal information
- Full name: Paul Bent
- Born: 1 May 1965 (age 61); Worcester, England
- Batting: Right-handed
- Bowling: Right-arm off-break

Domestic team information
- Years: Team
- 1985–1991: Worcestershire

Career statistics
Competition	FC	LA
Matches	32	3
Runs scored	1,289	51
Batting average	24.78	17.00
100s/50s	2/6	0/0
Top score	144	36
Balls bowled	18	0
Wickets	0	0
Bowling average	-	-
5 wickets in innings	0	0
10 wickets in match	0	N/A
Best bowling	-	-
Catches/stumpings	4/0	3/0
- Source: CricketArchive, 16 November 2008

Paul Bent (born 1 May 1965) is a former English cricketer who played first-class and List A cricket for Worcestershire between the mid-1980s and early 1990s.

Bent made his first-class debut against Cambridge University in June 1985, scoring 14 in his only innings. He was then confined to Second XI appearances for three years, until he was given a short run of games in the first team in July and August 1988. These included 31 and 50 (his maiden first-class half-century) against Yorkshire, as well as the highest score of his short List A career, 36 in a Refuge Assurance League game against Sussex.

The following summer, 1989, was the best of Bent's Worcestershire career. Although he had only a single (and unsuccessful) one-day outing, he played 13 first-class games and scored 530 runs at an average of just over 24. This was helped by a career-best innings of 144 against Kent at the end of July, in which he shared century partnerships with both Chris Tolley and Graeme Hick.

Bent never again played such a significant part in a season: he played no more List A games, and made only seven first-class appearances in 1990 and eight in his final year of 1991. He hit one more century, scoring exactly 100 not out in an opening partnership of 225 with captain Tim Curtis against Lancashire at Stanley Park in August 1991.

After the end of his Worcestershire career, Bent played minor counties cricket for Herefordshire in 1992, and unlike in his first-class days proved quite effective as a bowler, taking three or four wickets in an innings on a number of occasions.
