= Bent (Ssion album) =

Studio album by Ssion
- Released: September 18, 2012
- Genre: Electropop
- Length: 72:00
- Label: Dovecote

Ssion chronology
Fools Gold (2007)	Bent (2012)	O (2018)

Singles from Bent
- 1. "Earthquake" Released: July 3, 2012; 2. "Listen 2 the Girls" Released: September 4, 2012

Professional ratings
Aggregate scores
Source	Rating
Metacritic	63/100
Review scores
Source	Rating
Now	3/5 Ns
Pitchfork	6.8/10
Tiny Mix Tapes	4/5 stars

Bent is the third studio album by American musician Cody Critcheloe, under his pseudonym Ssion. It was released on September 18, 2012, by Dovecote Records.

== Critical reception ==
Bent was met with "generally favorable" reviews from critics. At Metacritic, which assigns a weighted average rating out of 100 to reviews from mainstream publications, this release received an average score of 63 based on 4 reviews.

In a review for Tiny Mix Tapes, critic reviewer Conrad Tao wrote: "Bent, the band’s newest record, is brazenly shallow pop music, aware of and confident in its insubstantiality and general tackiness. Bent seems like a fashionable record at the moment is curious — the witch house camp's visual sense is closely aligned with Cody Critcheloe's distinctive artwork, and 1980s pop deconstructionism is certainly experiencing a particularly strong renaissance right now." Eric Grandy of Pitchfork said: "It's unfair to judge Bent as a stand-alone object, as the point or the primary document of the SSION project rather than as merely one prong of many in a multimedia pincer attack."

== Track listing ==
Bent track listing
No.	Title	Writer(s)	Length
1.	"Listen 2 the Girls"	Mike Cheever; Cody Critcheloe; Ian Pai	3:27
2.	"Blonde With U"	Critcheloe	4:17
3.	"Psy-Chic"	Critcheloe	2:51
4.	"Luvvbazaar"	Critcheloe	4:21
5.	"Earthquake"	Critcheloe; Albert Redwine	4:19
6.	"High"	Critcheloe; J. Ashley Miller	4:58
7.	"Growin"	Critcheloe; Miller	4:37
8.	"Credit In the Straight World"	Stuart Moxham	4:05
9.	"Feelz Good (4-Evr)"	Critcheloe	3:36
10.	"My Love Grows In the Dark"	Critcheloe	3:36
11.	"Nothing Happens At Nite"	Critcheloe; Miller	8:06
12.	"Weird Yearz"	Critcheloe; Miller	4:14
13.	"Psy-Chic" (MNDR Remix)	Critcheloe	3:46
14.	"Psy-Chic" (Avan Lava Remix)	Critcheloe	4:15
15.	"Weird Yearz" (Das Hussy Remix)	Critcheloe; Miller	6:00
16.	"My Love Grows In the Dark" (Physical Therapy Stink Remix)	Critcheloe	5:27
