= Ann Bent =

American business mogul (1767–1857)

Ann Bent (1768–1857), was an American businessperson. She and Harriet Ryan were noted in the Memorial History of Boston as role models for successful businesswomen in Boston around the year 1800.

== Life ==
Ann Bent became an apprentice at a "crockery and dry goods" firm in Boston at the age of sixteen. In 1792, she started her own crockery and dry-goods shop on Marlborough Street in Boston. Her firm became one of the most successful in Boston within its category. She was known for her success in using the idea of high quality in taste and style, and reached a success in which she did not have to advertise. She was remembered as a successful businesswoman in Boston history.
