= Stovokor (band) =

American death metal band

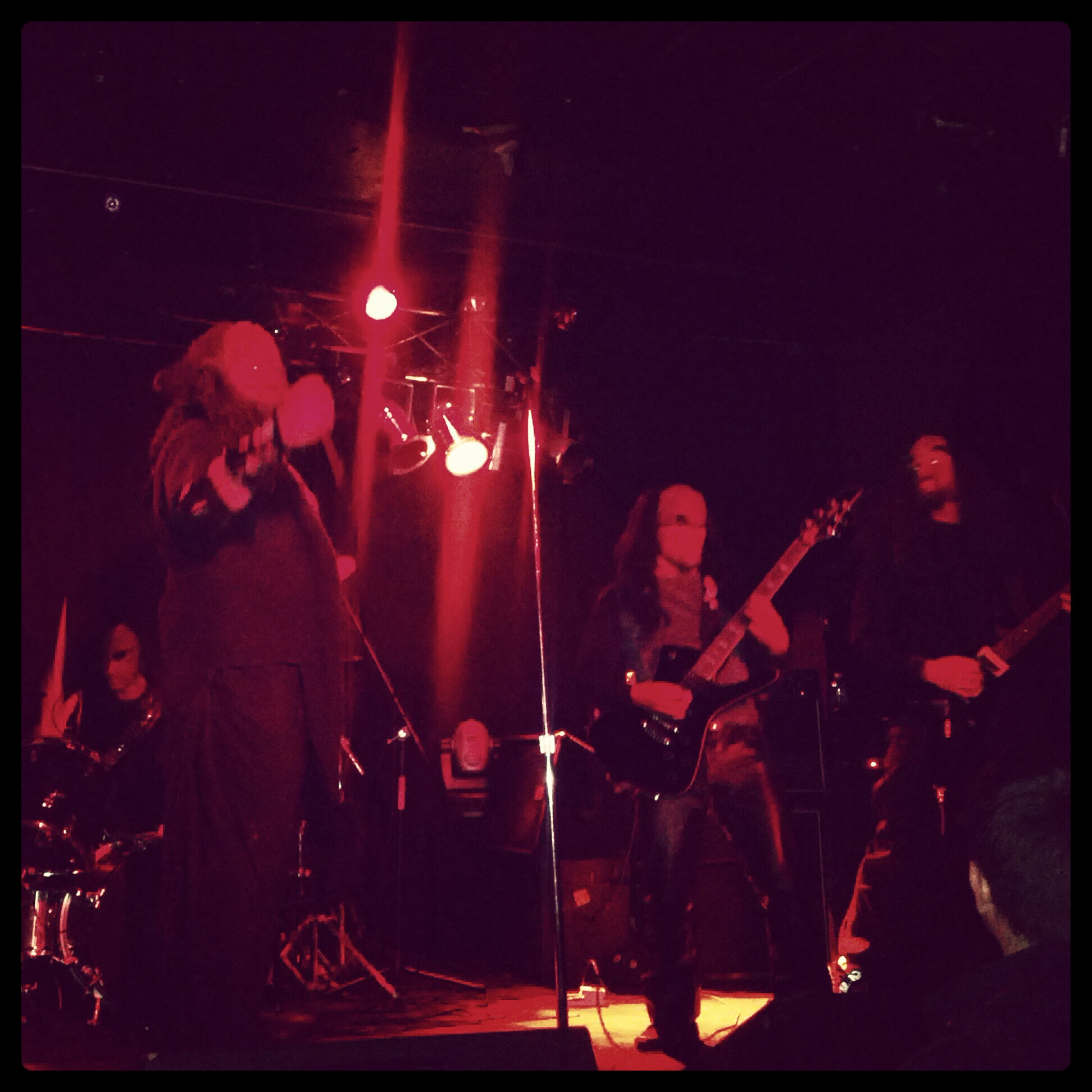

Background information
- Origin: Portland, Oregon
- Genres: Death metal
- Years active: 2001–present
- Label: Unsigned
- Members: Ward Young; Jason Lewis; Jason Johansen; Nikolai Danilchik; Dominic Nigro
- Past members: Sally Dodd; Bill Salfelder; Matt Stikker

Stovokor is an American death metal band from Portland, Oregon. Its six current members are DajahctʼIwjachpInʼa', vocals; Ward Young (KhRʼELL), rhythm guitar, Jason Lewis (KhraaʼNik), bass guitar; Jason Johansen (Qui pe), lead guitar; Nikolai Danilchik (logh norgh), lead guitar, and Dominic Nigro (ghorchal) drums. The band is solely based on the Klingon characters that appear in the Star Trek franchise. All of the members of Stovokor dress in Klingon costumes and many of the band's lyrics are written in the Klingon and English languages.

== Overview ==
The band is named for Sto-vo-kor, the afterlife of Star Trek's fictional Klingon species. Although acknowledging a debt to Klingon-themed karaoke, according to guitarist Ward Young, the band has chosen the perfect genre for their characters: "Klingons are very macho, very militaristic, and metal is definitely their music."

Band members have been known to strictly adhere to their personas. At a concert held at Lewis and Clark College in Portland, Oregon, lead vocalist Bill Salfelder attacked a crowd member after a short exchange of insults. The group has only released one demo album titled Metal of Honor in 2004, and have been known for appearing only sporadically. After lineup changes in 2012, the group resumed performing in the Portland area.

The band was featured in the documentary Trekkies 2 along with four other Star Trek themed bands including No Kill I and No Kill I the Next Generation who were filmed performing at venues such as Sabala's bar. The band has played notable shows in the company of Star Trek alumni, including one in September 2006 at the top of Seattle, Washington's Space Needle, for the fortieth anniversary of Star Trek.

== Discography ==
- Metal of Honor (demo, 2004)
