= Claudio Benetti =

Argentine footballer

Personal information
- Full name: Claudio Edgar Benetti
- Date of birth: 16 February 1971 (age 55)
- Place of birth: Córdoba, Argentina
- Height: 1.72 m (5 ft 8 in)
- Position: Midfielder

Senior career*
Years	Team	Apps	(Gls)
1992–1994	Boca Juniors	9	(1)
1993–1994	→ Belgrano (loan)	15	(2)
1995	Universitario Córdoba	–	(–)
1995	Deportes Temuco	22	(2)
1996	Melgar		
1997–1998	Nueva Chicago	15	(3)
1999–2000	Dallas Burn		
2001–2002	Huracán SR		
2002–2003	Estudiantes RC	7	(2)
- * Club domestic league appearances and goals

Claudio Edgar Benetti (born 16 February 1971 in Córdoba, Argentina) is an Argentine former footballer who played as a midfielder for clubs in Argentina, Chile, Peru and the United States.

== Teams ==
- (Argentina) Boca Juniors 1992
- (Argentina) Belgrano 1993–1994
- (Argentina) Boca Juniors 1994
- (Argentina) Universitario de Córdoba 1995
- (Chile) Deportes Temuco 1995
- (Peru) Melgar 1996
- (Argentina) Nueva Chicago 1997–1998
- (United States) Dallas Burn 1999–2000
- (Argentina) Huracán de San Rafael 2001–2002
- (Argentina) Estudiantes de Río Cuarto 2002–2003

== Post-retirement ==
Benetti had worked as an engine driver and iceman.

In 2022, Benetti joined Boca Juniors as a coach for the youth system.

== Honours ==
Boca Juniors

- Argentine Primera División: Torneo Apertura 1992
