= Bennetto Payne =

Mexican boxer (1909–1987)

Personal information
- Nicknames: The Aztec Assassin; Indian Benny Deathpaine
- Born: December 10, 1909 Yucatán, Mexico
- Died: February 7, 1987 (aged 77)
- Height: 6 ft 0 in (183 cm)
- Weight: Heavyweight; Light heavyweight

Boxing career
- Reach: 74 in (188 cm)
- Stance: Orthodox

Boxing record
- Total fights: 117
- Wins: 74
- Win by KO: 58
- Losses: 36
- Draws: 7
- No contests: 0

Bennetto Payne (born December 10, 1909 – February 7, 1987) was a Mexican professional boxer.

== Professional career ==
In January 1930, Payne beat Ad Kuhlow via a unanimous decision over eight rounds.
