= Death of Keane Wallis-Bennett =

2014 child death in Scotland

On 1 April 2014, shortly after 10 a.m., Keane Wallis-Bennett, a 12-year-old girl died whilst changing for a gym class at Liberton High School, Edinburgh, Scotland. A prefabricated wall in the middle of the changing room collapsed and hit Wallis-Bennett. The purpose of the free-standing wall was to provide privacy whilst changing and showering. Pupils at the school had complained about the wall being unstable some months before, but nothing had been done. Surveyors had not identified the wall as needing repairs. At least 13 schools were subsequently identified as having similar walls. There had been other problems with the buildings at Liberton High School. In December 2011, a 15-year-old student was injured after falling down a lift shaft. Wallis-Bennett's funeral was held at Mortonhall Crematorium.

British prime minister, David Cameron, said "It was an absolutely shocking accident... Clearly the lessons will have to be learned to make sure that tragic accidents like that cannot happen again."
