= Benetti (surname) =

Benetti is a surname of Italian origin. It may refer to:

- Benetti, an Italian shipbuilding and Boat building company based in Viareggio, Livorno, and Fano, owned by Azimut

== People ==
- Adriana Benetti (1919–2016), Italian actress
- Andrea Benetti (born 1980), Italian slalom canoeist
- Carlo Benetti (1885–1949), Italian film actor of the silent era
- César Benetti (1924–2014), Argentine swimmer
- Claudio Edgar Benetti (born 1971), Argentine former footballer
- Edo Benetti (1941–2025), Australian former football player
- Jason Benetti (born 1983), American sportscaster
- John Benetti (1937–2013), Australian rules footballer
- Manuel Benetti (born 1981), Italian former professional football defender
- Ramiro Moschen Benetti (born 1993), Brazilian professional footballer
- Romeo Benetti (born 1945), Italian former football defensive midfielder

== See also ==
- Bent, Benet, Benett, Bennet, Bennetts, Bennett,Bennette, Bennetti
