= Thomas Bennett =

Thomas or Tom Bennett or Bennet may refer to:

== Law and politics ==
=== Canada ===
- Thomas Bennett (Newfoundland politician) (1788–1872), Canadian merchant, magistrate and politician
- Thomas R. Bennett (1830–1901), Canadian merchant, magistrate and politician in Newfoundland
- Thomas Bennett (Canadian politician) (1835–1908), Canadian politician in Alberta

=== United Kingdom ===
- Thomas Bennett (lord mayor) (1543–1627), English merchant and Lord Mayor of London
- Thomas Bennet (lawyer) (1592–1670), English lawyer
- Thomas Bennett (MP for Hindon) (1620–1644), English politician
- Thomas Bennet (grammarian) (c.1645-1681), Oxford academic and cleric
- Thomas Bennett (MP for Nottinghamshire) (c. 1674–1738), British Whig politician
- Thomas Jewell Bennett (1852–1925), British MP for Sevenoaks

=== United States ===
- Thomas Bennett Jr. (1781–1865), American politician, Governor of South Carolina
- Thomas W. Bennett (Idaho politician) (1831–1893), American governor of Idaho Territory
- Thomas W. Bennett (Georgia politician) (1936–2024), American politician in Georgia
- Thomas M. Bennett (born 1956), American politician in Illinois

=== Elsewhere ===
- Thomas Westropp Bennett (1867–1962), Irish politician

== Sports ==
- Thomas Oliver Bennett (1852–1905), English rugby union footballer
- Thomas Bennett (cricketer) (1866–1942), Australian cricketer
- Thomas Bennett (footballer) (1891–1923), English footballer
- Tom Bennett (pole vaulter) (born 1923), American pole vaulter, 1949 NCAA runner-up for the Wisconsin Badgers track and field team
- Tom Bennett (footballer) (born 1969), Scottish footballer
- Tommy Bennett (born 1973), American football safety

== Others ==
- Thomas Bennet (academic) (died 1692), Master of University College, Oxford
- Thomas Bennet (clergyman) (1673–1728), English clergyman
- Thomas Bennett (musician) (c. 1784–1848), English organist
- Thomas A. Bennett (1803–1897), Irish Carmelite priest
- Thomas Boutflower Bennett (1808–1894), early colonist of South Australia
- Thomas Bennett (architect) (1887–1980), British architect
- Thomas W. Bennett (conscientious objector) (1947–1969), U.S. Army medic
- Tom Bennett (actor) (born 1979), British actor
- Tom Bennett (author), British blogger and author

== See also ==
- Thomas Bennett Community College in Crawley, England, named for the architect
