= Liberton High School =

Coordinates: 55°54′51″N 3°09′09″W

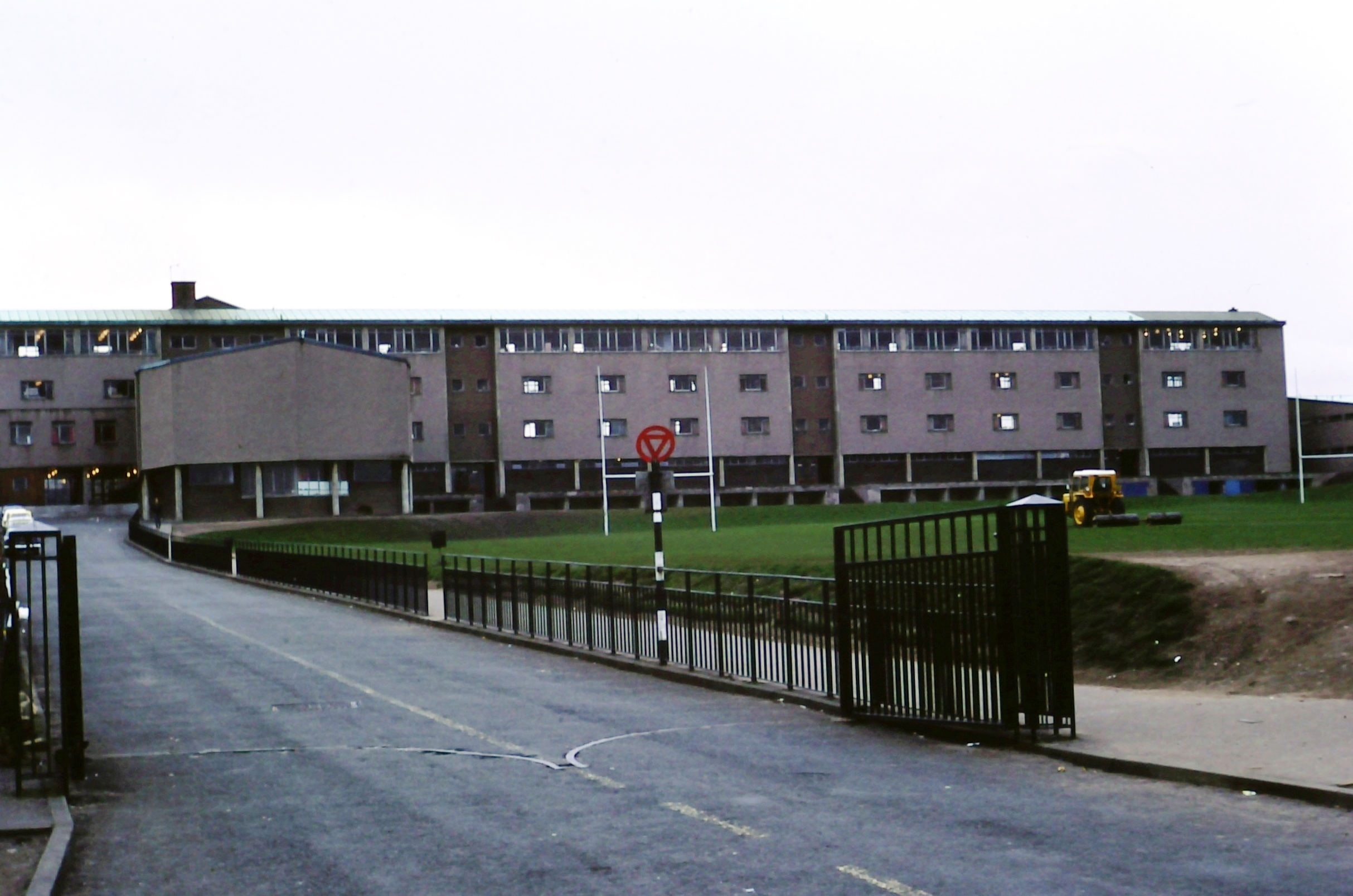
- Liberton High School in 1981

Location
- Gilmerton Road; Edinburgh, EH17 7PT; Scotland

Information
- Established: 14 May 1959
- Department for Education URN: 5533430 Tables
- Headteacher: Alison Humphreys
- Gender: Coeducational
- Age: 11 to 18
- Enrolment: 846
- Houses: Forth, Dee & Tay
- Colours: Blue, green and red
- Website: https://libertonhighschool.org/

Liberton High School is a secondary school in Liberton, in the south of Edinburgh, Scotland, which is located on Gilmerton Road. The school roll for the 2022–23 academic year was 846.

Liberton High School has had certain great achievements in sports, such as the undefeated girls hockey XI in 1970–71.

In football, they were the first Edinburgh school to win the Scottish Schools Secondary Shield, in 1966.

On 1 April 2014, a 12-year-old girl was killed when a wall collapsed in one of the school Physical Education department's changing rooms.

John Swinney, Deputy First Minister of Scotland, announced in December 2020 (as part of a £80M education investment) that Liberton High School would be entirely rebuilt. Construction began in 2023 and was scheduled to be completed in 2026.

== Headteachers ==
- John Jack (1959–1968)
- Henry Phillip (1968–1985)
- Joe Vettese (1985–1995)
- Gwen Kinghorn (1995–2005)
- Donald J. Macdonald (2005–2012)
- Stephen Kelly (2012–2022)
- Rob Greenaway (Acting Headteacher) (2022–2023)
- Alison Humphreys (2023–Present)

== Notable alumni ==
- Eamonn Bannon, retired footballer
- Eric Faulkner, member of The Bay City Rollers
- Paul Grant, footballer
- Bruce Hay, rugby union player (Member of British Lions)
- David Martin, MEP
- David Paton, musician
- Iain Stirling, TV personality
- Allan Wells, Olympic sprint champion, Moscow 1980

== Notable staff ==
- Roy Williamson, Scottish folk singer; member of The Corries; art teacher at the school
