= James Bennett (Tewkesbury) =

English printer and bookseller (1785–1856)

- Born: May 10, 1785; Thornbury, Gloucestershire, England
- Died: 29 January 1856; Tewkesbury, Gloucestershire, England
- Occupations: Printer; Publisher; Antiquarian
- Spouse: Anna "Hannah" Maria Phillips
- Children: 5 including Charles James Bennett who outlived him and 4 who died young
- Parent(s): John Bennett; Ann Collins

James Bennett (10 May 1785 – 29 January 1856) was a British printer and book seller who became a publisher. In 1830 he produced a history of Tewkesbury in Gloucestershire, England. Well regarded sources also describe him as a topographer, but without identifying his contribution to topography.

== Life ==
James Bennett was born at Green Farm, Falfield in Thornbury, Gloucestershire, roughly 15 miles (24 km) north-east of Bristol, sited on low ground a few miles inland to the east of the Severn Estuary. His father, an independent farmer called John Bennett, was father to thirteen recorded children, of whom James was the eighth. James attended school at nearby Stone and then embarked on an apprenticeship with George Robbins, a printer in Bath, at that time in the adjacent county of Somerset. By the time he was 25, he was back in Gloucestershire, now established on the northern edge of the county in Tewkesbury, where he is recorded from 1810 till 1852 as a printer and bookshop owner in premises at 139 High Street.

On 1823 he married Anna "Hannah" Maria Phillips, whose father is described as an alderman. The marriage produced five recorded children, four of whom predeceased their father, including two who died in infancy. Bennett took an active role in civic and church affairs, in 1828 being one of those who restored the Tewkesbury Abbey Church in 1828. His commitment to the town was confirmed in 1830 when he published his History of Tewkesbury. The work was based on an existing project by another printer, called William Dyde, but during the next couple of decades it was Bennett who each year produced a succession of expansions and supplements for it, in the "Tewkesbury Register and Magazine" which he published regularly till 1849. He produced an updated and abridged version in 1835, which he termed a "Guide".

James Bennett retired from business in 1851, by which time he had become "a person of substance" in Tewkesbury. He died early in 1856.
