= Autoheart =

English indie-pop band

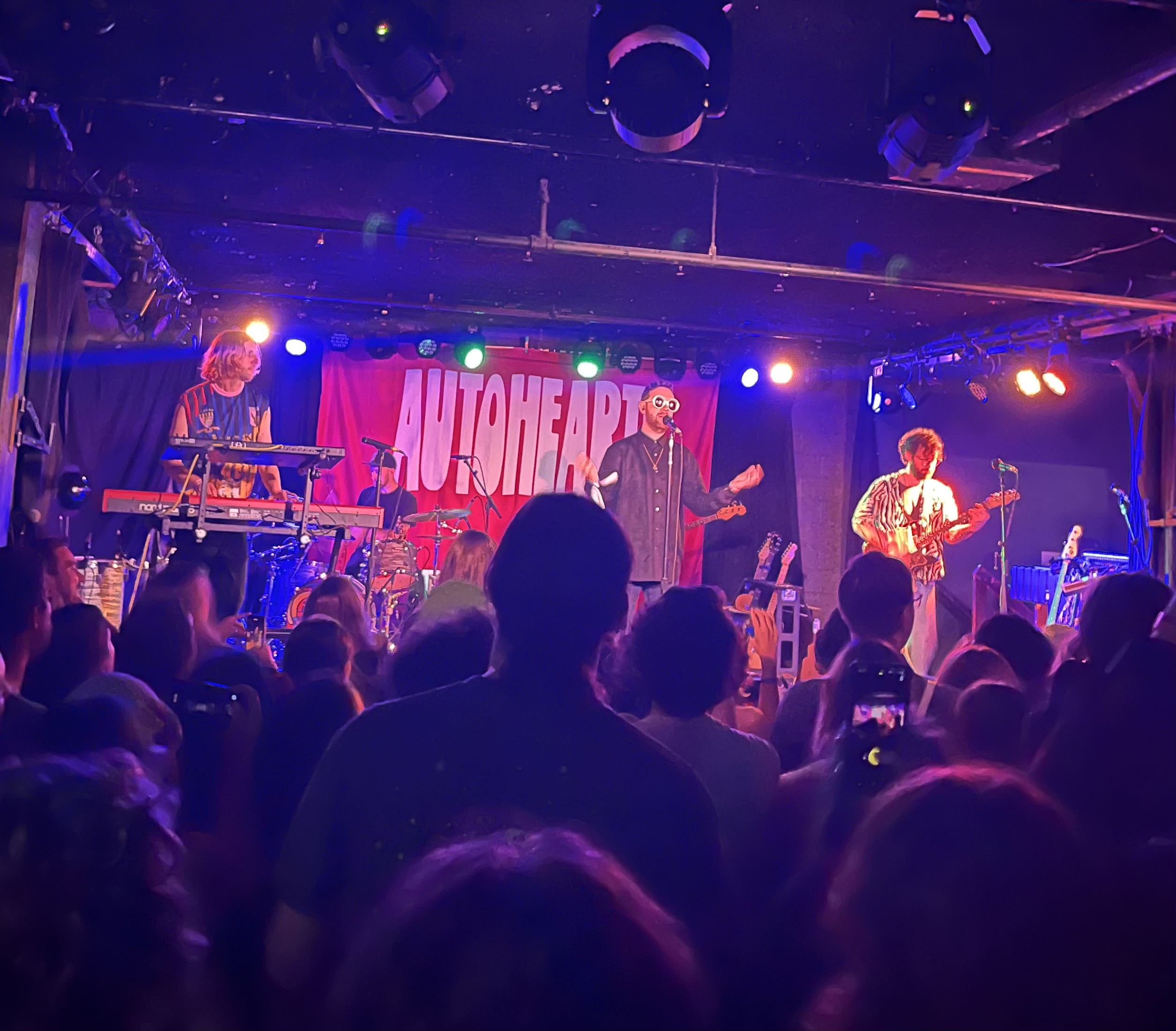

Background information
- Origin: London, England
- Genres: Indie Pop, Alternative Rock
- Instruments: Vocals, guitar, keyboards, drums
- Years active: 2011–present
- Label: O/R Records
- Members: Jody Gadsden, Simon Neilson, Barney JC
- Past members: Drew Wilson (left in 2008), David Roman, Jihea Oh (both left in 2014)
- Website: weareautoheart.com

Autoheart is a London-based indie-pop group formed in 2011, consisting of Jody Gadsden (vocals), Simon Neilson (piano, keys and saxophone), and Barney JC (guitar, bass, keys).

As of March 2024, the band releases their music independently. They have described themselves as "genre hoppers".

== History ==
=== The Gadsdens ===
Jody Gadsden and Simon Neilson met in 2007 and began working together under the name The Gadsdens after collaborating on a song for a short film soundtrack. The original lineup also featured drummer David Roman and guitarist Drew Wilson, who was later replaced by Barney JC. Their debut single, The Sailor Song, released in 2009, was championed by Bob Harris on his BBC Radio 2 Show and was Single of the Week on Shaun Keaveny’s BBC 6 Music radio show. The single release was accompanied by an animated music video by London-based animator and director Gavin Leisfield.

The Gadsdens appeared on The Radcliffe and Maconie BBC Radio 2 show on 17 November 2009, performing three tracks, The Sailor Song, Too Polite To Fight and Agoraphobia.

Maconie and Radcliffe placed the band’s live version of The Sailor Song on their "Best Live Sessions of 2009" end of year list. In response to the news that the BBC plan to cut Radcliffe and Maconie's radio show from four nights a week to three, Marc Lee from The Daily Telegraph mentioned The Gadsdens, commenting "I heard what proved to be my favourite songs of both 2008 and 2009 for the first time on the show – The Last of the Melting Snow by the Leisure Society and The Sailor Song by the Gadsdens, both of them strange and gorgeous".

Q made The Sailor Song their Track of the Day, calling it "a charming and pulsating piece of piano pop that holds no surprises, tempo shifts or digital tweaks, it’s naturally sentimental, sending strong links to Tracy Chapman, mostly due to the vocal style of frontman Jody Gadsden".

The band received praise from MTV and were featured in The Guardian's "The Measure" as one to watch.

=== Autoheart ===
The Gadsdens announced on 24 August 2011 they had "evolved" and were to be known going forward as Autoheart, a name derived from a lyric in The Sailor Song. On the same day, they posted a cover recording of "Ordinary Fool" on YouTube. The song was originally included on the Bugsy Malone soundtrack.

The band released a cover of Joni Mitchell's River at Christmas 2012.

The band were featured as The Guardian's New Band of the Day on 9 July 2013. Gadsden's vocal style was likened to that of Anohni and Andy Bell.

==== Punch (2013) ====
Autoheart's debut album Punch was released on 15 July 2013 on O/R Records. The lineup included bassist Jihea Oh and the album was produced by Danton Supple. The album's artwork was created by Young & Sick, a friend of the band. It was preceded by three singles: Control (5 November 2012), Lent (11 February 2013), and a double A-side single Moscow / Agoraphobia (8 July 2013). The band released a final single, Beat the Love (28 January 2014), which did not feature on the album.

A video for Moscow, directed by Gavin Leisfield, featured kissing Russian soldiers which the band said was to show "support and love to the LGBT communities of Russia and their friends, who are faced daily with violence and the criminalisation of love and of freedom of expression". The band also released self-directed videos for Agoraphobia and Beat The Love.

==== I Can Build A Fire (2016) ====
The band's second album, the self-produced I Can Build A Fire was released 26 August 2016. The lineup for the album included Berlin-based singer Anne Haight, who provided additional vocals on tracks Oxford Blood, We Can Build a Fire, and Joseph.

The video for the album's lead single Oxford Blood, released the same month, was directed by Prano Bailey-Bond, and starred American gender non-conforming model, actor and activist Rain Dove.

In June 2017, the band released an EP titled My Hallelujah featuring the title track, taken from the album along with three new songs. The video for My Hallelujah was directed by queer drag performer, artist and moving image creator Joseph Wilson.

==== Punch - Special Edition (2017) ====
In 2017, the band released Punch - Special Edition featuring home demo versions of album tracks, including an early demo of The Sailor Song.

On 27 December 2019 the band released the single Wretch. A video of the band performing the song live, directed by percussionist and film-maker Ruairi Glasheen, was released at the same time.

On 1 December 2023, Autoheart announced that the demos on Punch - Special Edition had been removed from the album online "pending the release of a new LP". Upon the release of Punch Demos (15 March 2024), the album was removed from all streaming services.

==== Hellbent (2021) ====
Their third album Hellbent was released on 29 October 2021, with the single I Know That He Loves Me out two weeks prior. The official video for the song was directed by Joseph Wilson, starring Italian, London based actor Claudio La Mattina.

On the day the album was released, an animated video for the title track Hellbent (collaboration with the singer Keziah of the band Black Gold Buffalo) was released, made by the artist AspenTart, who is also responsible for the album art.

On 9 September 2022, the band released the Time Machine EP featuring new tracks Scorpio, If Only In The Night and London In July with artwork from AspenTart. The Time Machine music video was directed by Siri Rodnes and starred Bailey Easton and Cavan Malone.

In 2023, the band released the single "Juggernaut", along with an accompanying music video directed by Joseph Wilson and featuring drag performer Fancy Shews!.

==== Punch (10th Anniversary Edition) - (2023) ====
On 29 December 2023, Autoheart released Punch (10th Anniversary Edition). The album contains remastered versions of the songs in Punch, as well as remasters of Beat the Love, Stalker's Tango, and Foolishly Wrong. Alongside those tracks, the album has singles Too Polite to Fight, To Love You, and I Killed Love.

The band version of Heartbreaker also features in the album, with a version of Moscow performed live at Urchin Studios in 2022 along with acoustic versions of Lent, Stalker's Tango, and Santa Fe.

==== Punch Demos (2024) ====
On 3 March 2024, Autoheart released a single titled Secret Diary - Demo. Alongside this release, the band announced that on 15 March 2024 their album Punch Demos would be released. It was released on schedule, and contains 18 demo songs, including remasters of those previously removed from Punch - Special Edition.

In March 2024, Autoheart toured in the United States for the first time, visiting 11 cities: Seattle, Berkeley, Los Angeles, Mesa, Denver, Ft. Worth, Atlanta, New York City, Columbus, Detroit, and Chicago.

==== Live Me Live Me Live Me (2024) ====
On 27 December, 2024 Autoheart released a live album of their recent "Love Me Love Me Love Me" United States tour, entitled Live Me Live Me Live Me. Each song played on tour was recorded from different locations on tour, including: Chicago, Ferndale, West Hollywood, Berkeley, New York City, Atlanta, and Seattle.

==== Heartlands & Heartlands Tour (2025) ====
The band announced in early 2025 that they would be releasing a new album entitled Heartlands on 15 August 2025. Alongside this, they announced in early April 2025 a second US, and Canadian, tour. In the lead up to the release of the album, the band has released three singles: Sad Divide, Baby Bird, Indigo Chateau released on 17 March, 27 May, and 7 July 2025 respectively. The album was released as scheduled.

The band released two music videos and one visualizer for Heartlands: for Sad Divide, Indigo Chateau, and Denial, respectively. Sad Divide was conceived, directed, and animated by Alex Benson. Indigo Chateau was directed by Joseph Wilson. Denial was directed by Autoheart and Ruairi Glasheen and was released on 15 August 2025.

== Discography ==
=== Singles & EPs ===
Single/EP title	Release date
The Sailor Song	30 November 2009
Control	5 November 2012
Lent including Foolishly Wrong and Stalker's Tango as B-Sides	11 February 2013
Moscow / Agoraphobia	8 July 2013
Beat the Love	14 February 2014
Possibility	22 July 2016
Oxford Blood	19 August 2016
My Hallelujah EP including Tucson, Robbing Banks and No Beat to my Heart	23 June 2017
Hungover in the City of Dust (Acoustic)	18 February 2019
Wretch	27 December 2019
I Know that He Loves Me	15 October 2021
Time Machine EP including Scorpio, If Only in the Night and London	9 September 2022
Juggernaut	18 August 2023
Too Polite to Fight	3 November 2023
The Heartbreaker EP including Heartbreaker (Band Version), To Love You, I Killed Love and Too Polite to Fight	1 December 2023
Secret Diary (Demo)	3 March 2024
Sad Divide	17 March 2025
Baby Bird	27 May 2025
Indigo Chateau	7 July 2025

=== Albums ===
Album title	Release date	Notes
Punch	15 July 2013	
Demos	30 May 2014	Bandcamp only release
I Can Build a Fire	26 August 2016	
Punch - Special Edition	22 June 2017	Release unavailable online
Hellbent	29 October 2021	
Punch (10th Anniversary Edition)	29 December 2023	
Punch Demos	15 March 2024	
Live Me, Live Me, Live Me	27 December 2024	
Heartlands	15 August 2025	
