= Benett =

Benett is a variant form of the surname Bennett, a medieval form of Benedict.

== People with the name ==
Notable people with the surname include:

- Etheldred Benett (1776–1835), English geologist
- Léon Benett (1839–1917), French painter
- Sarah Benett, (1850–1924), English suffragette
- Vere Fane Benett-Stanford (1840–1894), English politician

== See also ==
- Bent, Benet, Benett, Bennet, Bennetts, Bennett, Bennette, Bennetti
