= Bennette =

Bennette is a surname and unisex given name of English origin, a variant of Bennett. Notable people with the name include:

== Surname ==
- George Bennette (1901–1984), American baseball player
- Jewison Bennette (born 2004), Costa Rican footballer
- Peggy Bennette Hume (fl. 1968–present), British playwright and children's author

== Given name ==
- Bennette Misalucha (fl. 1980–present), American politician

== See also ==
- Bent, Benet, Benett, Bennet, Bennetts, Bennett, Bennette, Bennetti
