= James Bennet (clergyman) =

James Bennet (January 1817 – 29 June 1901) was born in Ireland and became a Presbyterian clergyman. He is known for significant contributions to secular and religious writing as an editor and an author.

Bennet came to Canada in 1854 and took up the post of minister in the Saint John Presbyterian Church located in Saint John, New Brunswick. He stayed at that post until his retirement in 1882. He developed as an editor and author, in part, by his association with William Elder. He worked with Elder on a variety of newspapers. These included the Colonial Presbyterian and Protestant Journal and the Saint John Daily Telegraph.
