= Benet (surname) =

Benet or Benét is a surname. Notable people with the surname include:

- BeBe Zahara Benet (born 1980), Cameroonian-American drag queen
- Brenda Benet (1945–1982), American actress
- Christie Benet (1879–1951), American politician
- Eric Benét (born 1966), American singer
- Juan Benet (1927–1993), Spanish writer
- Leslie Z. Benet (born 1937), American pharmaceutical scientist
- Mordecai Benet (1753–1829), Talmudist and chief rabbi of Moravia
- Robert Benet, 16th-century English Protestant
- Stephen Vincent Benét (1898–1943), American writer
- Stephen Vincent Benet (soldier) (1827–1895), career officer in the U.S. Army
- Sula Benet (1903–1982), Polish anthropologist
- Thomas Bennet (academic) or Thomas Benet, 17th-century Oxford academic
- Thomas Benet (martyr) (died 1531), English Protestant martyr
- William Rose Benét (1886–1950), American writer

== See also ==
- Bent, Benet, Benett, Bennet, Bennetts, Bennett,Bennette, Bennetti
