= William S. Bennet II =

- Born: 30 April 1934; Newburgh, New York USA
- Died: 24 November 2009 (aged 75); Boston
- Resting place: Squam Lake, New Hampshire
- Education: The Kiski School; Amherst College (BA)
- Spouse: Alice Talcott
- Children: Jennifer Layne Bennet; W. Stiles Bennet III; Pratt Hooker Talcott Bennet
- Parent(s): Augustus Witschief Bennet; Maxine Layne Bennet

William S. Bennet II (30 April 1934 – 24 November 2009) was an American business executive who introduced Yoplait single-serving yogurt to the United States. He was the son of Augustus Witschief Bennet (United States House of Representatives 1945–1947) and Maxine Layne Bennet, and grandson of William S. Bennet (US House of Representatives 1905–1911).

== Early life ==
Bennet was born in Newburgh, New York. He attended North Junior High School (1946–47) and The Kiski School (1947-1952), where he excelled in athletic activities. He served in the United States Army in Germany from 1952 to 1954. He obtained a BA degree from Amherst College in 1958, and married Alice Talcott (of New York City) in June 1958. They had three children.

== Career ==
Bennet began a sales career with Procter & Gamble in 1958. In 1960 he moved his family to Chicago to work in advertising sales for Look. In 1962 he moved to the Jewel Companies, where he rose to director of marketing for its foodstores division. During this time he obtained an MBA degree from the University of Chicago, attending night classes.

In 1968 Bennet led a group of investors to purchase a regional dairy producer, Michigan Cottage Cheese Company. He moved his family to Kalamazoo, Michigan to function as President and CEO of the business, which he soon expanded into a conglomerate of acquired divisions.

In 1972 the family moved to Paris, where Bennet immersed himself into a year–long intensive study of the yogurt business. He then used the facilities of his Michigan dairy business to develop Yoplait USA in 1973, and introduced that yogurt to the US market in 1974. He sold the two companies to General Mills in 1975, and moved his family to Concord, Massachusetts to establish himself as a consultant to the food industry. He served on the board of directors or advisors of Stoneyfield Farm Yogurt, The Country Hen, Grand Recipe Company, Inc., Intrinsic Solutions, Inc., Kettle Cuisine, Inc., BikeLink International and CityAccess.

He died on 24 November 2009, in Boston, Massachusetts. He had been diagnosed with dementia with Lewy bodies in 2006 and had been in declining health since then. His remains were cremated and the ashes interred at the family plot in Squam Lake, New Hampshire.

== Sports ==
In 1970, Bennet built the first platform tennis court in Western Michigan and later persuaded local country clubs to construct 16 more courts in the area. Additionally, he created a renowned regional tournament.
