= William Bennet (musician) =

British musician and composer (c. 1767 – c. 1833)

William Bennet or Bennett (c. 1767 – c. 1833 or after), born at Combe-in-Teignhead, Devonshire, was an English musician, a composer, organist and pianist.

Bennet's father was a landowner in Devon, but had himself been organist of St Andrew's Church, Plymouth. As a young man Bennet was taught at Exeter, but he later moved to London where he studied with Johann Christian Bach and with Johann Samuel Schroeter. Returning to the west of England, in 1793 he took up an appointment as organist at St Andrew's, Plymouth, and in 1797 he married a Miss Debell. His compositions include music for piano and organ, and anthems and songs for voice. In 1820 he wrote an anthem for the coronation of King George IV. Nothing is known of his life after this date, but he may still have been at St Andrew's in 1833.
