= Burney =

Burney may refer to:

== Places ==
- Burney, California, United States, an unincorporated town and census-designated place
- Burney, Indiana, United States, an unincorporated community
- Burney Falls, a waterfall in California
- Burney (hill), hill in Cumbria, England
- Burney Peak, Nelson Island, Antarctica
- Burney (crater), on the dwarf planet Pluto
- 6235 Burney, an asteroid

== People ==
- Burney (surname)
- Burney Lamar (born 1980), American stock car racing driver

== Other uses ==
- Burney baronets, a title in the Baronetage of the United Kingdom
- Burney Cars, the better-known name of Streamline Cars Ltd
- Burney Collection, an extensive British Library collection of 17th–18th century newspapers
- Burney guns, recoilless rifles designed by Sir Charles Dennistoun Burney

== See also ==
- Bernie (disambiguation)
- Burnie (disambiguation)
