= Bernie (surname) =

Bernie is a surname. Notable people with the surname include:

- Ben Bernie (1891–1943), American jazz violinist, bandleader and radio personality
- Dave Bernie (born 1948), Irish retired hurler
- Melvyn Bernie, founder of Mel Bernie Company, a manufacturer and wholesaler of costume jewelry and novelties

== See also ==
- Burnie (surname)
- Burney (surname)
