= M18 recoilless rifle =

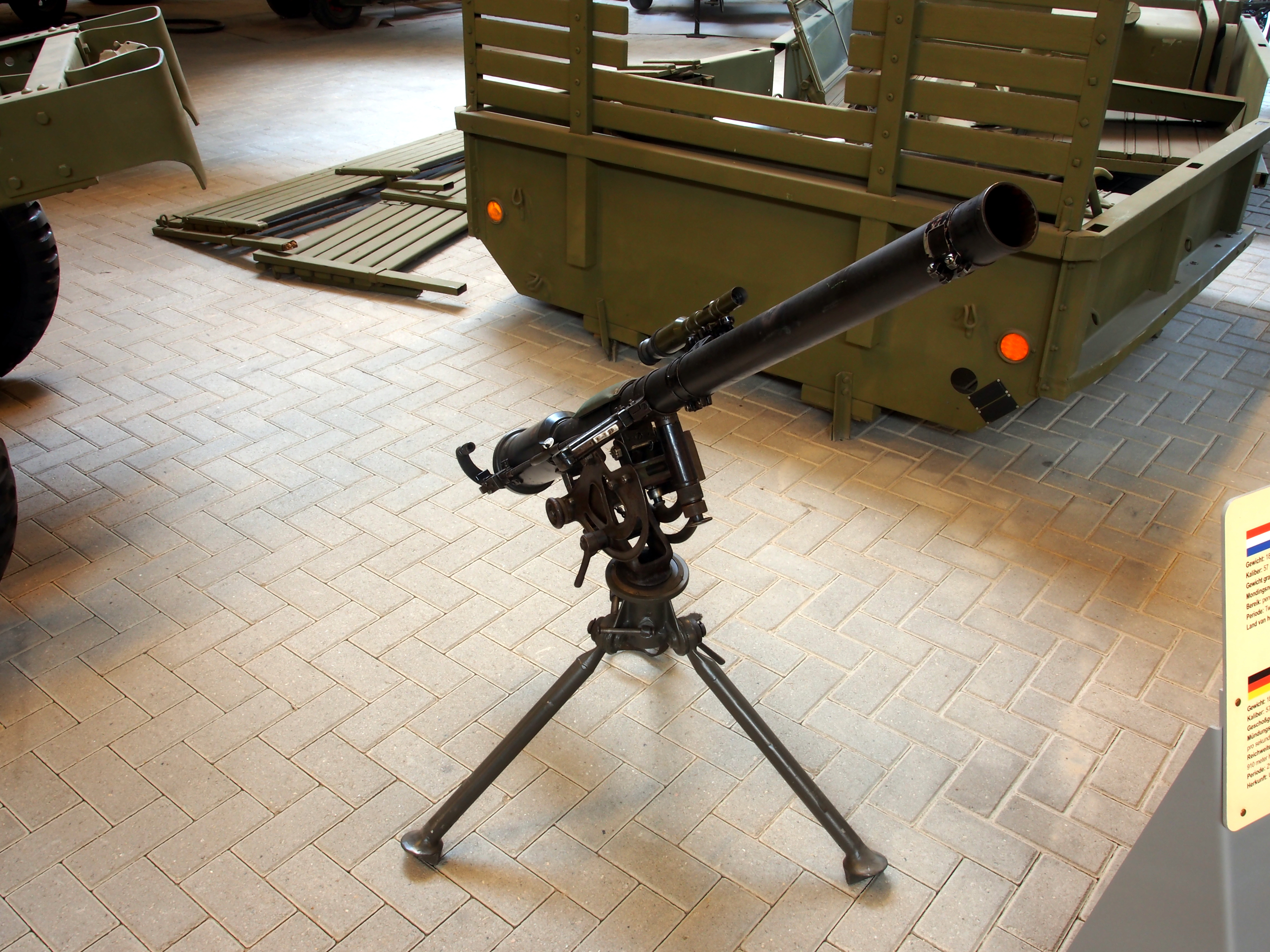
- M18 on a M1917A1 Tripod
- Type: Recoilless anti-tank weapon
- Place of origin: United States

Service history
- In service: 1945–1960s
- Used by: See Users
- Wars: World War II; Second Sino-Japanese War; Chinese Civil War; First Indochina War; Korean War; Algerian War; Portuguese Colonial War; Bay of Pigs; Bangladesh Liberation War; Chadian Civil War (1965–79); Vietnam War (limited); Cambodian Civil War; Laotian Civil War; Lebanese Civil War; Nicaraguan Revolution; Kurdistan Workers' Party insurgency; Syrian Civil War

Production history
- Designer: Kroger and Musser
- Designed: 1942
- Produced: October 1944
- Variants: Type 36

Specifications
- Mass: 44.4 lb (20.1 kg)
- Length: 61.6 in (1,560 mm)
- Crew: 1 or 2
- Shell: 57×303mmR; HEAT (5.3 lb (2.4 kg)); HE (5.3 lb (2.4 kg)); WP (5.3 lb (2.4 kg))
- Caliber: 57 mm (2.2 inches)
- Action: Interrupted lug rotating breechblock
- Recoil: Recoilless
- Carriage: M1917A1 machine gun tripod mount
- Elevation: +65° to −27°
- Traverse: 360°
- Muzzle velocity: 1,200 ft/s (370 m/s)
- Effective firing range: 490 yd (450 m)
- Maximum firing range: 4,340 yd (3.97 km)
- Sights: Telescope M86C 2.8-power

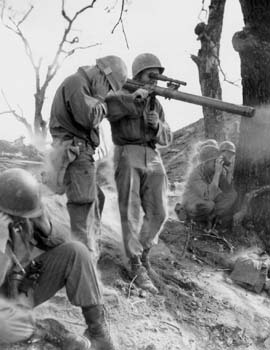
US Army Soldier firing a 57 mm M18A1 recoilless rifle from the shoulder. 9th Infantry, 2nd Infantry Division in Korea, 5 September 1951

The M18 recoilless rifle is a 57 mm shoulder-fired, anti-tank recoilless rifle that was used by the U.S. Army in World War II and the Korean War. Recoilless rifles are capable of firing artillery-type shells at reduced velocities comparable to those of standard cannons, and almost entirely without recoil. The M18 was a breech-loaded, single-shot, man-portable, crew-served weapon. It could be used in both anti-tank and anti-personnel roles. The weapon could be both shoulder fired or fired from a prone position. The T3 front grip doubled as an adjustable monopod and the two-piece padded T3 shoulder cradle could swing down and to the rear as a bipod for the gunner. The most stable firing position was from the tripod developed for the water-cooled Browning M1917 machine gun.

== Origins and development ==
During World War II, the U.S. Army's Artillery Section was working on a 105 mm recoilless cannon, based on captured models of the German 10.5 cm Leichtgeschütz 40 that used a plastic blow out plug in the cartridge case. At the same time, there was a freelance research by the U.S. Army's Infantry Section of a man-portable recoilless 57 mm cannon by two engineers, named Kroger and Musser. Instead of a blowout plug, the infantry section's recoilless cannon used a British development, Ordnance, RCL, 3.45 in developed by Dennistoun Burney, from in which the cartridge case had hundreds of small holes in the side walls with a lining of plastic on the inside of the cartridge case walls to keep water and other elements out until the round was fired. Another unique innovation was the use of pre-engraving bands on the 57 mm projectile that engaged the barrel's rifling. (Note: While many sources claim the pre-engraving on the M18 projectiles drive band in 1943 was a first, the Germans in World War I had this feature on projectiles for their famous Paris Gun. Later it was discovered that pre-engraving the band gave no advantage and future rounds were produced without this feature.) The belief was this feature would reduce friction on firing, allowing more of the propellant gases to be used to force the shell towards the target and less being used to achieve the recoilless effect and therefore giving their design a much higher muzzle velocity than most recoilless cannon at that time period had achieved. (Note: With most recoilless cannon, there is a 1-to-9 ratio—meaning that when the weapon is fired, one part of the propellant gases is used to force the shell forward and the other 9 parts of the propellant gases are expelled to the back to counter act that forward force, achieving a recoilless effect.)

The "Kromuskit", as the new 57 mm weapon was called (a word play on the engineers' family names) was officially designated the T15 and first tested in November 1943. The tests proved that the Infantry Section's concept for a recoilless weapon was superior to the Artillery Section's concept and the development of the 105 mm weapon was canceled. In late 1944, the T15 was redesignated the M18 57 mm recoilless. The cannon and 57 mm ammunition were placed in mass production. Four types of ammunition were initially produced: (Note: The "T" designation was for experimental or early production shells and is similar to the modern "XM" designation. The "M" designation is used for standardized items.) an anti-tank HEAT round (T20E2 / M307), an HE round (T22 / M306), a Smoke (White Phosphorus) "bursting smoke" round (T23 / M308), and a Training Practice round. By early 1945, over 2,000 M18 recoilless rifles and 800,000 rounds of ammunition were on order. After World War II ended, a canister round (T25E5) with a range of 175 meters was also produced.

== US service ==
The weapon was crewed by a two-man team, the gunner and the loader, who fired it from either a prone, kneeling, or standing position. It could also be awkwardly carried, fired from the shoulder and reloaded by one man in an emergency, fired prone from the extended T3 monopod and bipod, or fired from a fixed position on a cradle mounted on the M1917A1 machine gun tripod. The weapon was carried in a T27 Cover with two padded shoulder straps, designed to be simultaneously carried by two men in line with the straps slung over their shoulder on one side.

Ammunition was packed four shells to a wooden crate, each crate weighing about 40 lbs and had a volume of 0.86 cubic feet. Three 57 mm recoilless rifle shells could be carried per M6 rocket bag (designed for the 2.36-in bazooka rockets) and slung on one shoulder by the ammunition bearers assigned to the weapon.

=== World War II ===
The first fifty production M18 57 mm cannons and ammunition were rushed from the factories to the European theater in March 1945. Further examples were subsequently sent to the Pacific Theater. The first combat the new cannon saw was with the U.S. Army's 17th Airborne Division near Essen, Germany as well as U.S. Forces in the Po Valley in Italy during the 1945 Spring Offensive. While the performance of the high explosive (HE) warhead was impressive, the M18's 57 mm HEAT round was slightly less so, only about 76.2 mm (3 in) of armor penetration at 90 degrees, compared with the M6A3 rocket for the bazooka which had a penetration of 100 mm. The only effective way to knock out German tanks was a clean shot to the rear of the tank or to cause malfunctions by hits on the seams or joint of the tanks such as the gun turret elevation joint of the main gun, junction points of the turret and hull which would cause burn over of working mechanism and produce jamming and finally a hit on the tracks to immobilize a tank. They could then be destroyed by infantry bazooka team, anti-tank guns or field artillery. (Note: The M18's M307 HEAT round used a hemispherical (rounded) liner rather than the normal conical liner to counteract the effect of rotation.)

In the Pacific Theater, the new lightweight 57 mm cannon was an absolute success as "pocket artillery" for the soldiers of U.S. Army infantry units that were issued the M18. It was first used in the Pacific Theater during the Battle of Okinawa on 9 June 1945, and proved with its HE and white phosphorus rounds it was the perfect weapon for the hard fighting that took place against the dug-in Japanese in the hills of that island. The only complaint the U.S. Army had was the lack of sufficient 57 mm ammunition for the M18.

=== Korean War ===
Each U.S. Army rifle company in the Korean War was authorized three M18 recoilless rifles. The Marine Corps did not use the 57mm. Veterans of the Korean War have mentioned the use of the M18 against enemy machine gun nests. For anti-tank tasks, however, the M18 was too weak; the Soviet-built T-34 tank was extremely hard to penetrate even for the 2.36-inch (60 mm) Bazooka of World War II. The only way would have been flank or rear shots. U.S. infantry, initially with very few capabilities against these targets, solved the problem with new weapons like the 3.5-inch (89 mm) M20 Super Bazooka, which was powerful enough to destroy T-34s.

=== Vietnam War ===
Although obsolete as an anti-tank weapon, the M18 was still used by the Army of the Republic of Vietnam and its allied forces in an anti-personnel role. It was able to use the NATO-standard M74 tripod, and proved with its HE and white phosphorus rounds it was the perfect weapon for the hard fighting that took place against dug-in People's Army of Vietnam forces.

== Ammunition ==
Ammunition for the 57 mm M18 consisted of fixed rounds; that is to say, the propelling charge is not adjustable and an integral part of the ammunition. It is easily identified by a pre-engraved rotating band, a perforated cartridge case, and a positioning band.

In 1948, four types of round were available for the 57 mm M18, with a canister round (with a range of 160 meters) being added later:

General characteristics of 57 mm rifle ammunition
Type of round	Weight of round		Length of round		Weight of projectile as fired		Type of filler	Weight of filler		Weight of propellant		Type of fuze	Action of fuze	Weight of 4 rounds in a box	
Type of round	lb	kg	inch	mm	lb	kg	Type of filler	lb	g	lb	g	Type of fuze	Action of fuze	lb	kg
HE (M306)	5.3	2.4	17.54	446	2.75	1.25	TNT	.6	270	.93	420	M89	PD, SQ	44	20
HEAT (M307)	5.3	2.4	18.78	477	2.75	1.25	50/50 Pentolite	.39	180	.93	420	M90	PI, BD non-delay	45	20
Smoke WP (M308)	5.3	2.4	16.83	427	2.75	1.25	WP	.27	120	.93	420	M89	PD, SQ	43	20
TP (M306)	5.3	2.4	17.54	446	2.75	1.25	Inert and black powder	.45 and .07	204 and 32	.93	420	M89	PD, SQ	42	19
Canister (T25E5)	5.43	2.46	15.48	393	-	-	154 or 176 steel slugs	1.8	820	.93	420	N/A	N/A		

== Production and use outside the US ==
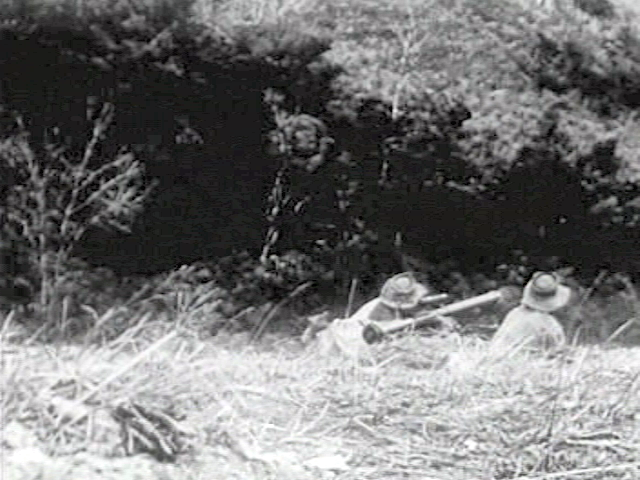
French soldiers using M18 recoilless gun against Việt Minh during First Indochina War (1953)

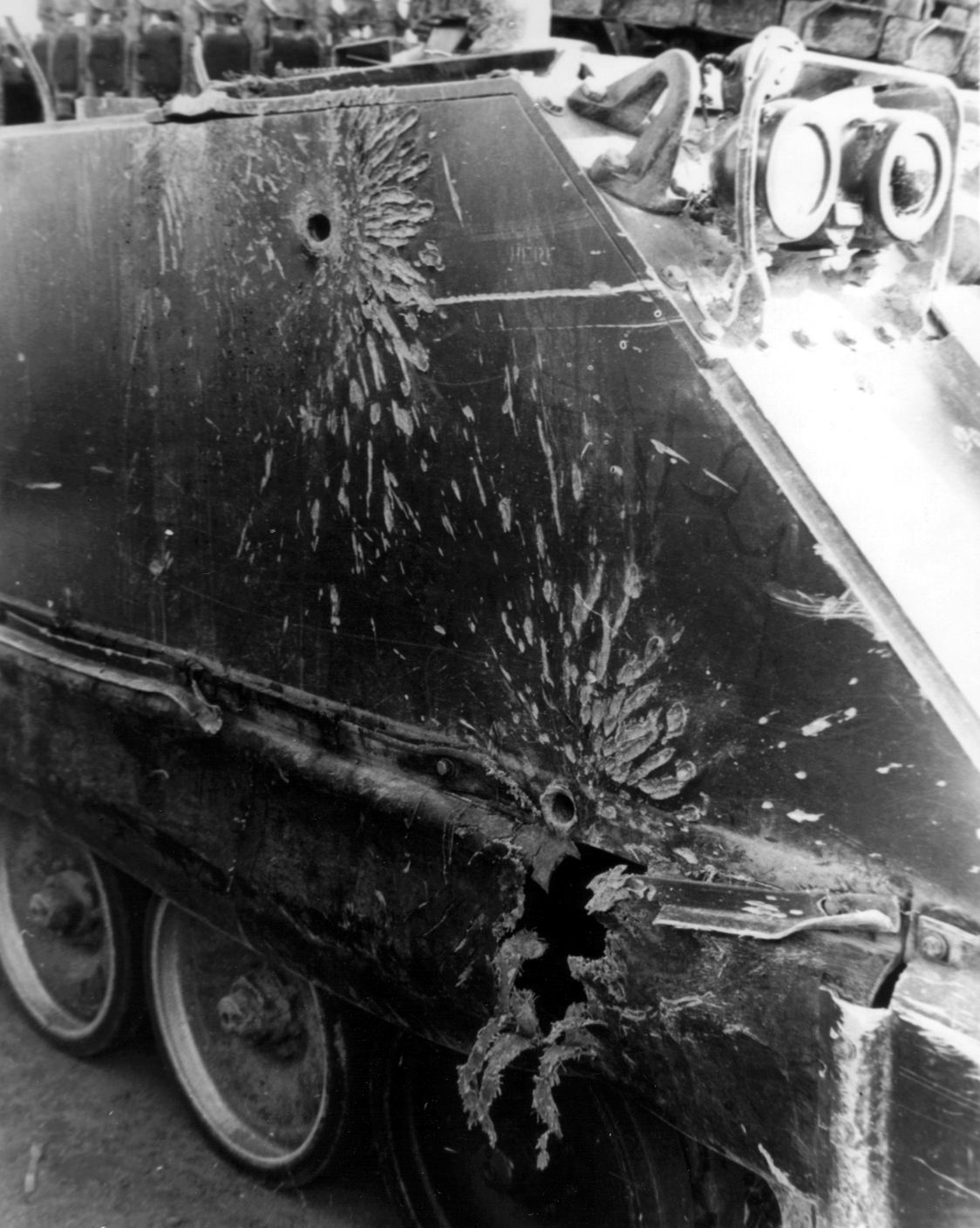
57mm impact marks on an American M113 APC during the Vietnam War.

The M18 was copied by the People's Republic of China as the Type 36. The U.S. had provided Nationalist China the blueprints for the weapon. When the communist Chinese seized the factory, they took advantage of the facilities and blueprints to make their own copy of the weapon. China provided the communist Vietnamese the Type 36 in 1963 for use in the Vietnam War. Tanzania was also a user of the Type 36. In a strange twist, the Chinese version of the M18 can fire both U.S. and Chinese manufactured ammunition, but the U.S. made M18s cannot fire Chinese ammunition. This was done deliberately by increasing the bore of their weapons and ammunition by 1 mm, making their munitions too large for use by NATO weapons in the event of capture, but not vice versa. The French army also used M18 guns during the First Indochina War, Algerian War and French intervention in Сhad in 1970.

As late as 1984, the M18 57 mm recoilless rifle was still being produced under license in Brazil by Hydroar in São Paulo.

== Users ==
- Brazil
- Chad
- Republic of China (1912-1949)
- Republic of the Congo
- Democratic Republic of the Congo
- Cyprus
- El Salvador
- Ethiopian Empire
- France
- Guatemala
- Haiti
- Honduras
- India
- Mauritania
- Mexico
- Myanmar
- Netherlands
- Nicaragua
- Niger
- China: Type 36 variant
- Philippines
- South Korea: The Armed Forces began receiving M18s from the U.S. in 1951, and 1,578 were in service with the Army by the end of the Korean War. Also used during the Vietnam War.
- South Vietnam
- (Syrian opposition) Syrian National Army
- Tanzania
- Thailand used during the 1973 Thai popular uprising
- Togo
- Turkey: 913 units
- United States
- Vietnam: Việt Minh and Viet Cong
- Zambia

== See also ==
- M20 recoilless rifle
- M40 recoilless rifle
