= Spotting rifle =

Ranging device for artillery

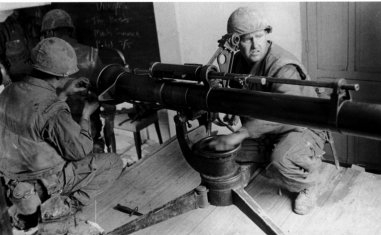
US Marines with a 106 mm M40 recoilless rifle, during the Battle of Huế in February 1968

A spotting rifle or ranging gun is a small-calibre rifle used as a ranging device for artillery. The ballistics of the spotting rifle are matched to those of the artillery piece, so that if a shot from the spotting rifle lands on the target, it may be assumed that the main weapon will also do so.

== Anti-tank recoilless rifles ==
Spotting rifles were most commonly used with recoilless rifles as anti-tank artillery, from the 1950s to the 1970s. These weapons are used for direct fire with line-of-sight visibility to the target. As recoilless rifles have a relatively low muzzle velocity and thus a high trajectory, accurate ranging is important An optical sight can measure the bearing to a target, but not easily or accurately measure the range. Optical rangefinders were too large for lightweight portable artillery, and the later development of laser rangefinders would in turn make spotting rifles obsolete.

The British BAT series of 120 mm anti-tank recoilless rifles used a variety of sighting systems. The original BAT used a purely optical sight. The MoBAT, a lightweight and more portable version, had a 7.62×51mm NATO Bren light machine gun. The final version, the WOMBAT, used the same American Remington M8C .50 in as the M40 recoilless rifle. Both of these were used as gas-operated semi-automatic rifles. The .50 was not, as often assumed, a development of the .50 M2 machine gun using the 12.7×99mm NATO cartridge, but was a shortened 12.7×76mm cartridge.

Where a vehicle, such as the M50 Ontos, used multiple barrels, spotting rifles were usually provided for each barrel so that each could be accurately boresighted to its own barrel. The Ontos used six barrels with four spotting rifles; two without, to avoid making an already tall vehicle even higher. This provision may have been over-generous, although it did also increase the magazine capacity available for repeated ranging shots. Many photographs of the Ontos in service in Vietnam show it with only two of the spotting rifles installed in their mounts. The Ontos also often carried only four or even two main gun tubes.

=== Recoilless rifles using spotting rifles ===
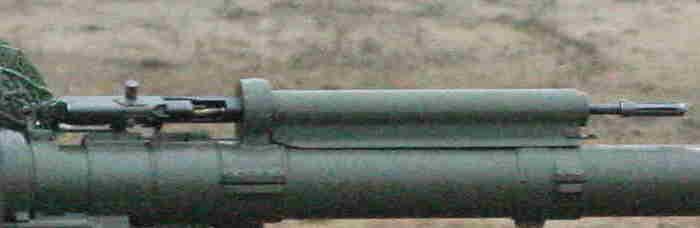
Inskjutningsgevär 5110 7.62x51mm NATO caliber spotting rifle

- Davis gun
- M40 recoilless rifle
- M50 Ontos
- Model 1968 Recoilless Gun
- MoBAT
- Pansarvärnspjäs 1110
- Type 60 Self-propelled 106 mm Recoilless Gun
- WOMBAT

== Rocket launchers ==
Perhaps the smallest weapons to use spotting rifles are man-portable shoulder-launched rocket launchers.

The British 94mm LAW 80 is a rocket launcher developed as a replacement for the LAW 66 and Carl Gustav to give a more powerful infantry anti-tank capability. This uses a 9 mm rifle with a 5-round magazine and a particularly unusual design of ballistically matched cartridge.

This same spotting rifle (Mk 8 Mod 0) and round was later adopted for the US 83 mm Shoulder-launched Multipurpose Assault Weapon (SMAW).

== Tank main guns ==
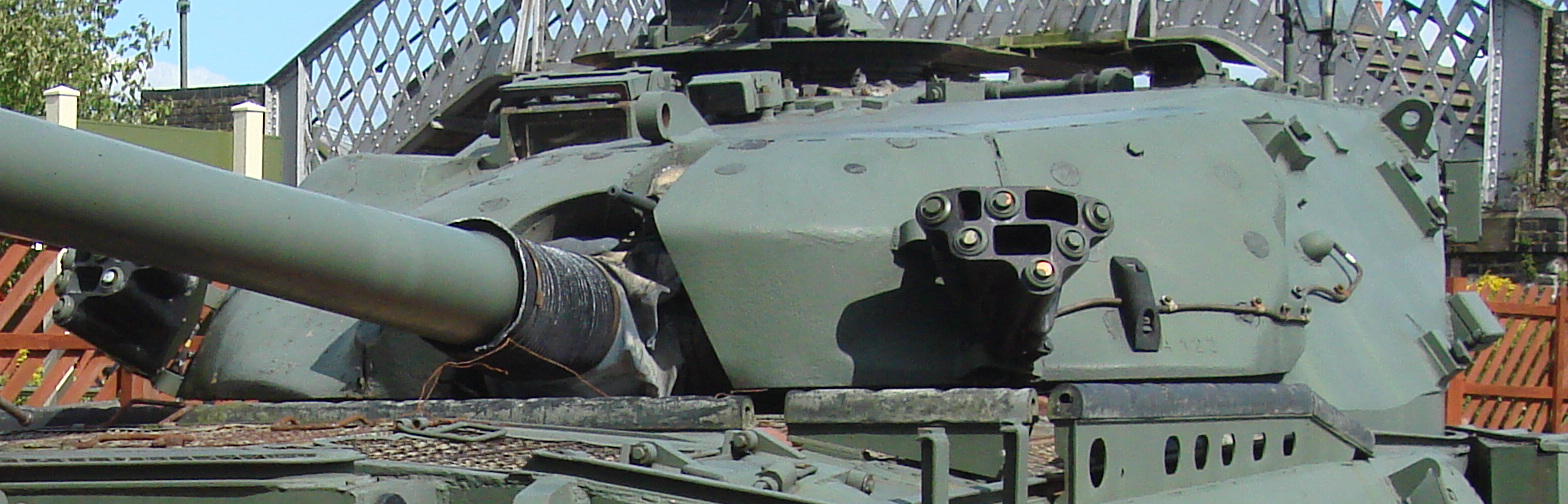
Chieftain, with the ranging gun barrel just visible above the main gun in the mantlet

A rare few tanks have used spotting rifles, termed a "ranging gun" for ranging their main gun. This was a short-lived use, from the period in the 1950s when the increasingly powerful tank guns (and their reduced capacity for spare ammunition) encouraged a more carefully ranged first shot in the hope of an immediate kill, and the later development of laser rangefinders.

The British Centurion Mk 5/2 with its new 105 mm L7 main gun introduced a ranging gun. This was derived from the M2 Browning design, both the L6 variant of the gun and also its 12.7×99mm ammunition. This ammunition was once again ballistically matched to the main gun. As this was a rather higher velocity round than the recoilless rifles, the case was the same as the M2 and the rounds could be used in either weapon. The enhanced tracer effect of the spotting round was sometimes used in an M2. Mounted in the Centurion it was alongside another conventional co-axial machine gun, the ranging gun being the one in the mantlet closest to the main gun.

The ranging gun was considered a success on the Centurion and was fitted to several marks of it, including retrofitting to earlier models with the 84 mm gun. The same ranging gun principle was later used for the 120 mm gun of the Chieftain. It was considered less successful with the more powerful gun, as the range for accurate ranging was limited to 2,600 yards — beyond this the tracer element burned out and the fall of shot could no longer be seen. As the gun's own range with HESH could be up to 8,700 yards, this represented a serious limitation on performance. Battle planning at this time also saw a need for combat at increasing ranges, from the 2,000 yards expected for the Centurion's vintage out to 3,000 yards and beyond. As soon as they became available, the Chieftain rapidly adopted a laser rangefinder instead.

A later UK light tank using a ranging gun is the FV101 Scorpion, which uses a 7.62mm L43A1 machine gun. This is mounted as a normal co-axial machine gun and may be used as such. It is a development of the standard British L8 Tk MG, used on a number of AFVs and Artillery Pieces. It has an additional barrel bearing that is used to mount the gun. This bearing, rather than mounting by the receiver as for the L8, gives a more consistent point of impact between a cold and hot barrel, which is important for use when ranging.

== See also ==
- Penetration aid, a term (predominantly used in aviation/strategic weaponry) for a device/tactic to increase the capability of reaching the target.
- Combination gun
