= Charles Burney (disambiguation) =

Charles Burney (1726–1814) was an English music historian.

Charles Burney may also refer to:

- Charles Burney (archdeacon of Colchester) (1786–1864), Anglican priest, father of the below
- Charles Burney (archdeacon of Kingston) (1815–1907), Anglican priest, son of the above
- Charles Burney (schoolmaster) (1757–1817), son of the music historian, English classical scholar, schoolmaster and priest
- Charles Fox Burney (1868–1925), Biblical scholar at Oxford University, England
- Charles O. Burney Jr. (1907–1972), New York politician
- Dennistoun Burney (Sir Charles Dennistoun Burney, 2nd Baronet, 1888–1968), English aeronautical engineer, private inventor and Conservative Party politician
- Charles A. Burney (born 1930), British archaeologist

== See also ==
- Charles McBurney (disambiguation)
- Burney (disambiguation)
