= Burnie (disambiguation) =

Burnie is a city in Tasmania, Australia.

Burnie may also refer to:

- City of Burnie, a local government body of Tasmania
- Electoral district of Burnie, a former electoral district of Tasmania
- South Burnie, a suburb of the City of Burnie
- HMAS Burnie, a Bathurst-class corvette of the Royal Australian Navy
- Burnie (mascot), the mascot of the Miami Heat
- Burnie (surname), a surname
- Michael Justin "Burnie" Burns, an American film director

== See also ==
- Bernie (disambiguation)
- Burney (disambiguation)
