= B-11 recoilless rifle =

Soviet recoilless gun

107mm B-11 recoilless gun
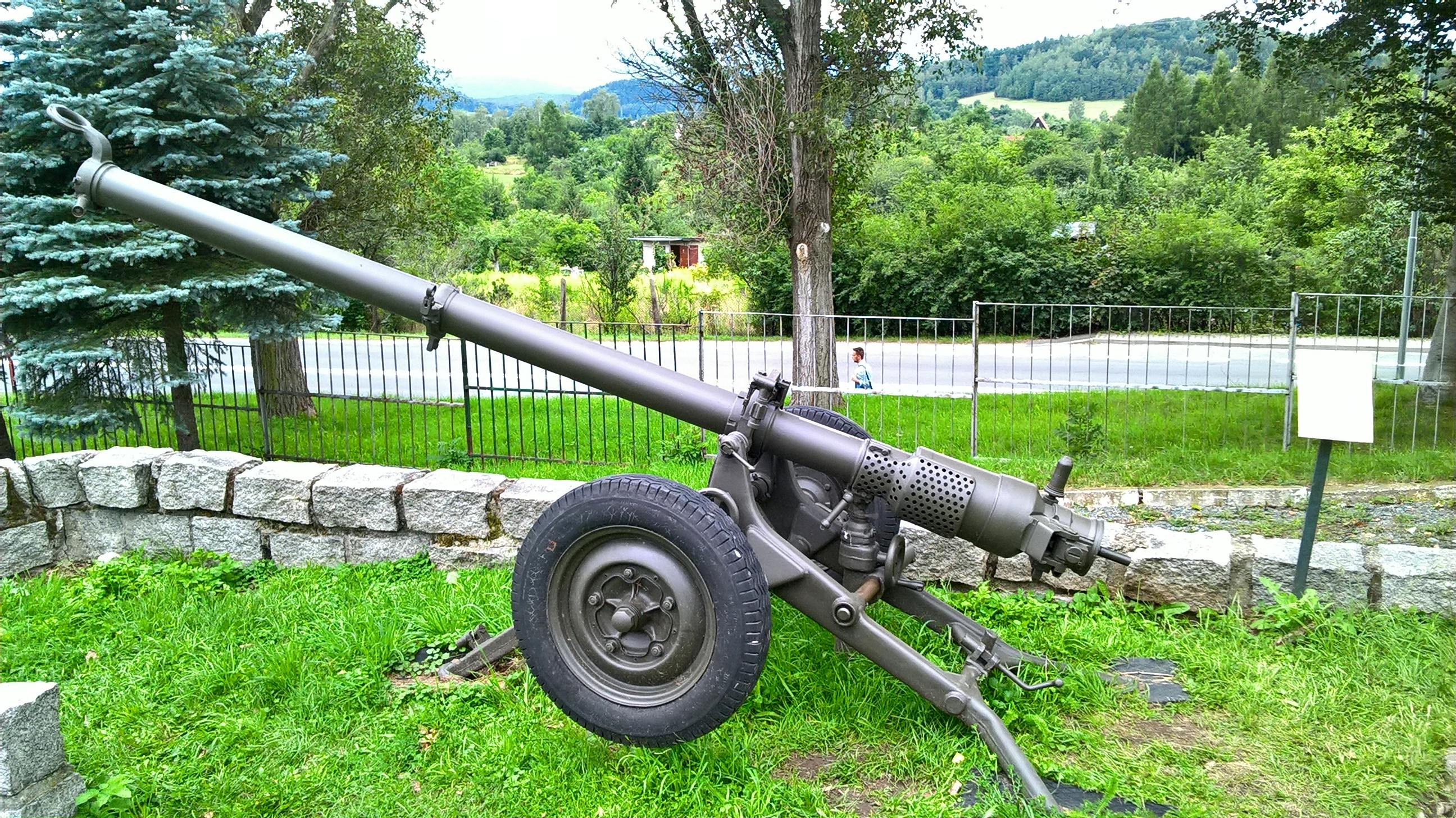
- A gun used by the Polish Armed Forces
- Type: Recoilless gun
- Place of origin: Soviet Union

Service history
- In service: 1954–1969 (Soviet Union)
- Used by: See users
- Wars: Biafran War; Vietnam War; Yom Kippur War; Lebanese Civil War; Iran–Iraq War; Gulf War; Bosnian War

Specifications
- Mass: 240 kg (530 lb)
- Length: 356 cm (140 in)
- Barrel length: 338.3 cm (133.2 in)
- Width: 145 cm (57 in)
- Height: 90 cm (35 in)
- Crew: 5
- Shell: High-explosive (HE); High-explosive anti-tank (HEAT)
- Shell weight: 8.5 kg (19 lb) (HE); 7.5 kg (17 lb) (HEAT)
- Caliber: 107 mm (4.2 in)
- Elevation: −10° to 45°
- Traverse: 35°
- Rate of fire: 5–6 rpm
- Muzzle velocity: 375 m/s (1,230 ft/s) (HE); 400 m/s (1,300 ft/s) (HEAT)
- Effective firing range: 450 m (1,480 ft) (HEAT round)
- Maximum firing range: 6,650 m (21,820 ft) (HE round)

The B-11 recoilless gun, also known as RG-107 (Rückstoßfreies Geschütz) is a Soviet 107 mm (4.2 in) smoothbore recoilless weapon firing fin-stabilized HE and HEAT rounds. It entered Soviet service in 1954. By the 1970s, it was no longer in service, having been replaced by the SPG-9, though as of 2025, it remains in use with other countries.

The B-11 would see use in conflicts in the Sub-Saharan Africa, the Balkans, the Middle East, and Southeast Asia regions.

== Description ==
The B-11 is a 107 mm (4.2 in) recoilless gun, it uses a smoothbore barrel firing fin stabilized High-explosive (HE) and High-explosive anti-tank (HEAT) rounds. The B-11 breech swings down (while the B-10 is opened horizontally) and is fitted with a PBO-4 sight.

When firing HEAT rounds, the gun has an effective range of 450 m (1,480 ft) and is capable of penetrating 380 mm (15 in) of RHA at a 90° angle. Despite rumors, the B-11 cannot fire M40 recoilless rifle ammunition. The projectiles and cartridge cases dimensions and designs are radically different, the M40A1 uses a rifled barrel while the B-11 is a smoothbore, and the Soviet gun was fielded in 1954, while the American in 1958. As Rottman puts it: "It would have been rather difficult for the Soviets to have designed a weapon capable of firing as yet to be fielded US ammunition."

The breechblock has an enlarged chamber section and is covered with a grill or perforated jacket to protect the crew from the hot chamber.

The wheels can be removed and gun is fitted with tripod legs that are folded under the barrel in traveling position. The gun is normally fired from the tripod, but in case of emergency it can be fired without removing the wheels, albeit with reduced accuracy. The B-11 can be employed in the anti-tank role but the sights also allow it to be used in the indirect fire role using HE rounds.

The B-11 is usually towed by the muzzle from a ZIL-157 6×6 or UAZ 4×4 truck, but its light enough to be manhandled. According to Foss, the gun weights only 260 kg (570 lb) when ready to fire, while Hogg and Isby give a weight figure of 305 kg (672 lb).

== Operational history ==
The B-11 was first fielded by the Soviet Army in 1954; Six guns were issued for each battalion. In 1969, the Soviets introduced the SPG-9 to replace the B-10 and B-11 in service. Following the poor performance of the B-10 in the hands of Arab armies during the Six-Day War, some Soviet battalions reportedly replaced their B-10 and B-11s with 57 mm anti-tank guns kept in reserve as a stopgap measure until the arrival of the SPG-9.

The B-11 saw limited use with Nigerian forces during the Biafran War. The gun would see wider usage during the Vietnam War with the People's Army of Vietnam (PAVN) and the Viet Cong; and the Yom Kippur War. Egyptian anti-tank teams deployed a wide variety of weaponry in waves: platoons armed with RPG-7s would provide short-range coverage, followed by teams armed with AT-3 Sagger missiles, followed by a third wave armed with B-10 and B-11 recoilless guns, with subsequent waves carrying ammunition for the anti-tank teams.

The Palestine Liberation Organization (PLO) possessed considerable numbers of B-10, B-11, and SPG-9s alongside Western-made 75 mm recoilless guns during the Lebanese Civil War, though their effectiveness were hampered by poor training and Israeli counter-battery fire.

During the Gulf War, Iraqi infantry used the SPG-9 alongside the older B-11 and B-10 recoilless guns. Croatian militias during the Bosnian War made use of a large variety of Soviet and Yugoslav-made recoilless guns, including the B-11.

== Users ==
=== Current ===
- Algeria − 60 as of 2025
- Angola − Serviceability doubtful
- Cambodia
- Ethiopia
- Iran
- Laos

=== Former ===
- Bulgaria
- China
- Czechoslovakia
- East Germany
- Egypt − Used during the Yom Kippur War
- Herzeg-Bosnia − Used by the Croatian Defence Council
- Iraq − Used during the Gulf War
- North Korea
- Nigeria − Some used during the Biafran War
- Palestine Liberation Organization − Used in Lebanon
- Poland
- Romania
- Somalia − Supplied by China
- Soviet Union
- Vietnam − Used by the PAVN and Viet Cong

== See also ==
- B-10 recoilless rifle
