= SPG-82 =

- Type: Antitank rocket launcher
- Place of origin: Soviet Union

Service history
- In service: 1950 to mid-1970s
- Used by: Soviet Union, Syria, Afghanistan and various Warsaw Pact countries, Indonesia
- Wars: Portuguese Colonial War; Soviet–Afghan War; Afghan Civil War (1989–1992); Syrian civil war

Production history
- Designer: NII-6
- Designed: 1944
- Produced: 1950 to 1964

Specifications
- Mass: 37.8 kg
- Length: 2.15 m
- Crew: 2 or 3
- Caliber: 82 mm
- Action: Single shot
- Recoil: Recoilless
- Carriage: Two wheels
- Rate of fire: 5 to 6 rounds per minute
- Effective firing range: 200 m direct
- Maximum firing range: 700 m

The SPG-82 (transliterated Russian: Stankovyi Protivotankovyi Granatomet - heavy antitank grenade launcher) was a Soviet wheeled antitank rocket launcher that entered service after the end of World War II. It was replaced in Soviet service by the B-10 recoilless rifle from 1954 but remained in service with some armies, notably in the Middle East until the 1970s. The SPG-82 was also carried by BRIMOB (the Indonesia Police Mobile Brigade) in 1963. It has been replaced by B-10 recoilless rifle.

== Description ==
The weapon consists of a long barrel tube with a flared muzzle, supported by a simple carriage with two small solid wheels. A curved shoulder pad is attached to left side of the barrel, and a large shield is fitted to protect the crew from the back-blast produced by the rocket projectiles. The shield is not thick enough to provide protection from enemy fire. The weapon is normally fired from the carriage, but it can be dismounted and shoulder fired by two men working together to support the weapon.

The weapon fires two types of projectiles, a general purpose explosive/fragmentation round, the OG-82, and an armour piercing anti-tank round, the PG-82. It has two sets of iron sights corresponding to the two different rounds fired by the weapon. The HE sight is graduated out to 700 meters while the weapon's effective range for the HEAT round is around 200 meters.

== Ammunition ==
Round name	Warhead name	Type	Weight	Warhead weight	Length	Armour penetration
PG-82	GK-662	HEAT	4.4 kg	0.69 kg	694 mm	230 mm to 175 mm
OG-82	GO-662	HE-FRAG	4.7 kg	0.41 kg	626 mm	N/A

== Users ==
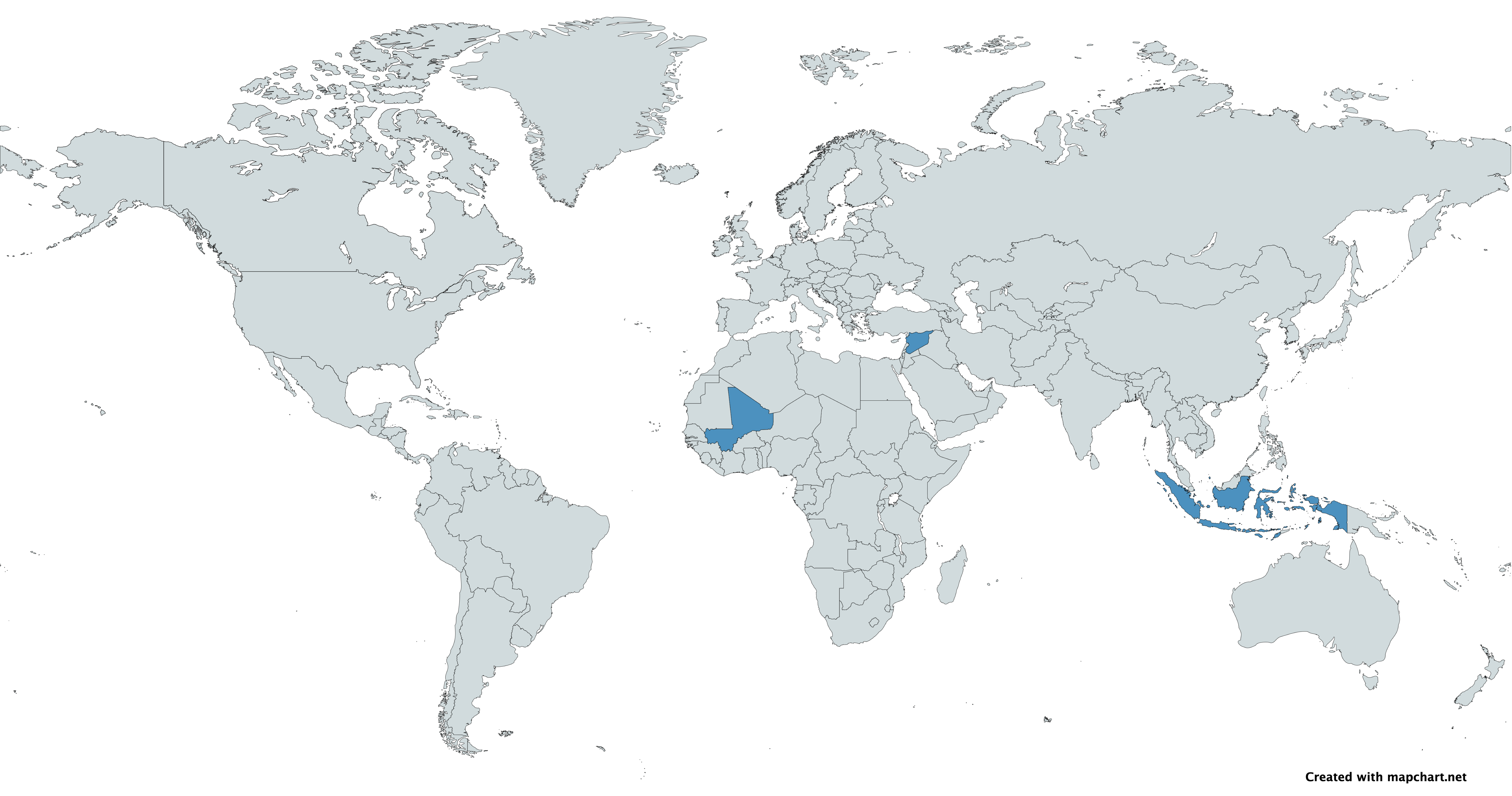
Map with SPG-82 users in blue

- Afghanistan
- Indonesia: Used by BRIMOB.
- Mali
- North Korea
- Syria
- Soviet Union

== See also ==
- List of Russian weaponry
- SPG-9
