= Burney (surname) =

Burney is a surname. Notable people with the surname include:

- Amari Burney (born 2000), American football player
- Ansar Burney (born 1956), Pakistani-Arab human rights activist
- Cecil Burney (1858–1929), British admiral
- Charles Burney (disambiguation), several people
- Christopher Burney (1917–1980), British spy during World War II
- Clarence A. Burney (1876–1933), Justice of the Supreme Court of Missouri
- Dennistoun Burney (1888–1968), British engineer and inventor
- Edward Francis Burney (1760–1848), English artist and illustrator
- Frances Burney (1752–1840), English novelist and diarist
- Henry Burney (1792–1845), British agent, ambassador of the East India Company
- James Burney (1750–1821), British admiral
- Linda Burney (born 1957), Australian politician
- Sarah Burney (1772–1844), novelist, known as S.H. Burney
- S. M. H. Burney (Sayed Muzaffar Hussain Burney, 1923–2014), Indian civil servant
- Venetia Burney (1918–2009), namer of the dwarf planet Pluto
