= Charles McBurney =

Charles McBurney may refer to:

- Charles McBurney (archaeologist) (1914–1979), American archaeologist
- Charles McBurney (politician) (born 1957), member of the House of Representatives for Florida
- Charles McBurney (surgeon) (1845–1913), American surgeon who described McBurney's point

== See also ==
- Charles Burney (disambiguation)
