= Burney Peak =

Mountain in the South Shetland Islands

Location of Nelson Island in the South Shetland Islands.

Burney Peak (62°18′34″S 58°51′46″W) is a peak rising west of Duthoit Point in the eastern part of Nelson Island, in the South Shetland Islands. It was named by the UK Antarctic Place-Names Committee in 1961 for Captain Burney, Master of the British sealing vessel Nelson, probably from London, who visited the South Shetland Islands in 1820–23.
