= Cecil Dennistoun Burney =

Zambian politician

Member of the National Assembly for Ndola
- In office 1964–1968
- Preceded by: Seat created
- Succeeded by: Misheck Banda

Member of the Legislative Council of Northern Rhodesia for Luanshya–Kansenji
- In office 1962–1964

Member of the Legislative Council of Northern Rhodesia for Ndola
- In office 1959–1962
- Preceded by: Bill Rendall
- Succeeded by: Seat abolished

Personal details
- Born: 8 January 1923; London, England
- Died: 19 April 2002 (aged 79)
- Political party: UFP (1959–1964); NPP (1964–1966); Independent (1966–1968)
- Profession: Businessman

Sir Cecil Dennistoun Burney, 3rd Baronet (8 January 1923 – 19 April 2002) was a British businessman and politician in Zambia (1959-1970), having emigrated in 1951 but returning to Britain in 1970.

== Biography ==
Burney was born in London in 1923 to the British naval officer and politician Dennistoun Burney (a Conservative Party MP for Uxbridge) and his American wife Gladys. He was educated at Eton College and then joined the Royal Navy in 1942, serving as a radar officer in the Arctic convoys. After the war he attended Trinity College, Cambridge and studied engineering, also rowing for the college. After leaving university, Burney moved to Northern Rhodesia to work for Anglo American in the Nchanga Mines in 1948. In 1951 he established a car dealership named Northern Motors, and in 1957 he married Hazel Coleman, with whom he had two sons. Between 1956 and 1959 he was President of the Northern Rhodesia Motor Traders' Association.

In the 1959 general elections, Burney contested the Ndola seat in the Legislative Council as the United Federal Party candidate, and was elected with 58% of the vote. He subsequently became deputy to UFP leader John Roberts. The Ndola seat was abolished prior to the 1962 general elections and Burney successfully ran for re-election in the Luanshya–Kansenji seat.

The 1964 general elections saw ten 'reserved roll' seats created for the European population, with Burney running for re-election in the recreated Ndola seat as a member of the new National Progressive Party. He was re-elected to the Legislative Council, which became the National Assembly upon independence later in the year, and chaired the Public Accounts Committee. The National Progressive Party was dissolved in 1966, after which its former members sat as independents. He remained a member of the National Assembly until the 1968 elections, prior to which the reserved roll seats were abolished.

Burney succeeded his father to the Burney baronetcy in 1968, and returned to England in 1970. He joined the Conservative Party and was president of the West Berkshire Conservative Association, but was told that he was too old to stand for Parliament. After giving up his chairmanship of Northern Motors in 1972, he became chair of the Hampton Trust property firm in 1975, later working with Michael Ashcroft. He was chairman of the Rhino Group software firm between 1988 and 1992.

Baronetage of the United Kingdom
| Preceded by Dennistoun Burney | Baronet (of Preston Candover); 1968–2002 | Succeeded by Nigel Dennistoun Burney |
