= 120 mm BAT recoilless rifle =

British recoilless rifle

L6 Wombat
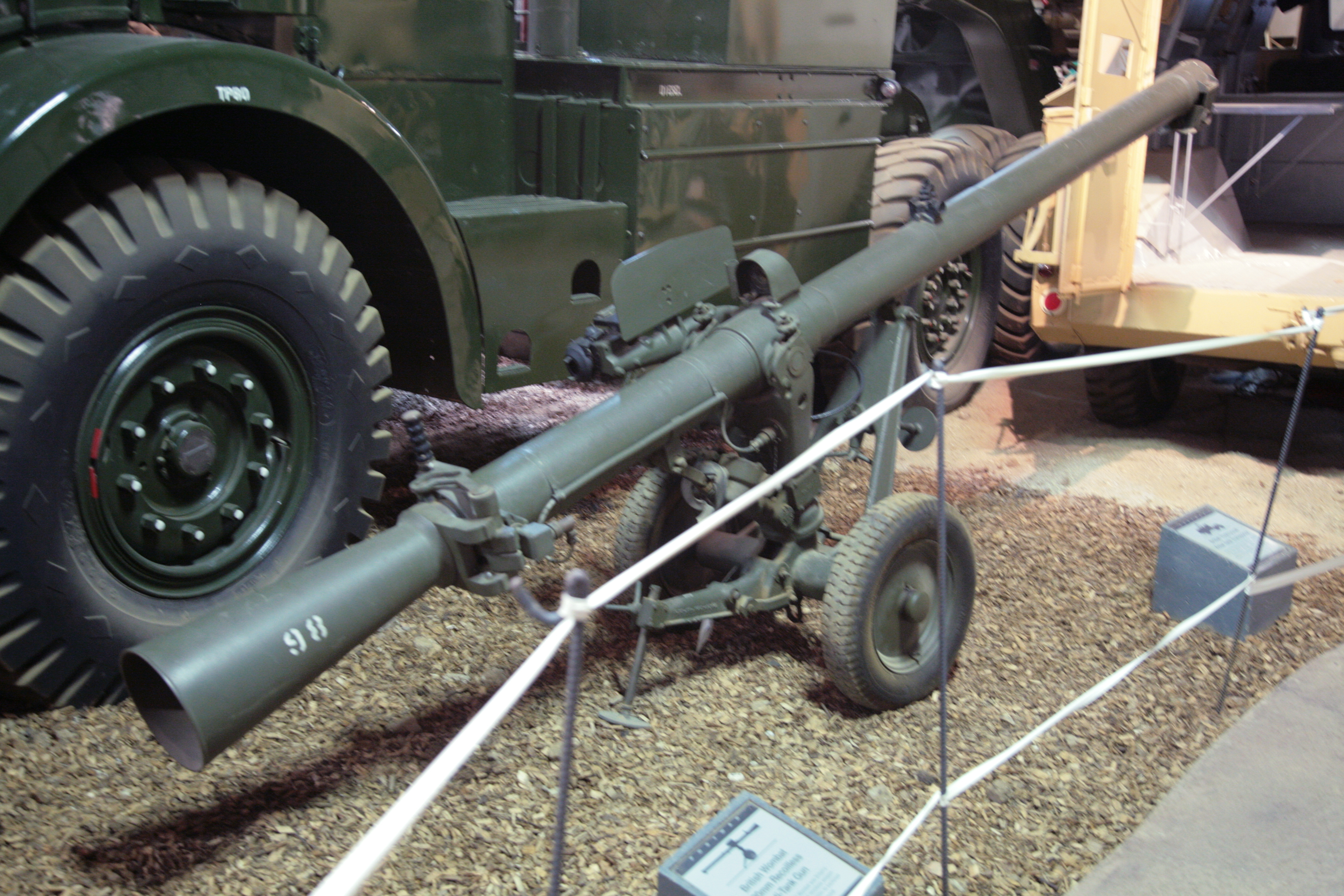
- A Wombat at Imperial War Museum Duxford
- Type: Recoilless rifle
- Place of origin: United Kingdom

Service history
- Used by: Great Britain; Australia
- Wars: Vietnam War

Production history
- Designed: 1950s

Specifications
- Mass: 308 kg (679 lb)
- Length: 3.86 m (12 ft 8 in)
- Barrel length: 33.33 calibres
- Height: 1.09 m (3 ft 7 in)
- Crew: 3 (DC) Detachment Commander, (No.1) Spotter + main armament loader + maintained the spotting Rifle, (No.2) Driver, main armament unloader and rear security + back blast observer
- Shell: 12.8 kg (28 lb 4 oz) HESH
- Calibre: 120 mm (4.7 in)
- Elevation: -8 to +17°
- Traverse: 360°
- Rate of fire: 4 rounds per minute
- Muzzle velocity: 463 m/s (1,520 ft/s)
- Effective firing range: 1,000 m (1,100 yd)
- Maximum firing range: 1,610 m (1,760 yd)
- Sights: Optical with spotting rifle

The L2 BAT (Battalion, Anti-Tank) was a 120 mm calibre recoilless anti-tank rifle used by the British Army. It was also produced in the MOBAT version without a gun shield, and the ConBAT version with a new spotting rifle attachment. The L6 Wombat version was lightened. The Wombat was used by mobile units, such as paratroopers and marines, and some TA battalions, such as 5th Battalion, The Royal Anglian Regiment.

BAT was developed from the wartime Ordnance, RCL, 3.45 in, replacing it and the Ordnance QF 17-pounder to become the standard anti-tank weapon of the Army in the post-World War II era. The BAT and MOBAT were used until anti-tank guided missiles, such as Vigilant and MILAN, took their place. WOMBAT remained in anti-tank platoons in Berlin to supplement MILAN until the late 1980s, due to the expected engagement ranges should the Warsaw Pact have ever attacked. The wire guidance of MILAN would also have been problematic in the built up areas of Berlin. It was envisioned that Wombat would be used in 'shoot-and-scoot' attacks mounted on the back of stripped down Land Rover vehicles.

The Wombat was a development version, which was adopted and replaced the earlier BAT and MOBAT weapons. It was, in turn, replaced by anti-tank guided missiles. The L6 Wombat itself comprised the L12A3 BAT gun, but mounted on a new lightweight carriage. The vertically sliding breech of the BAT and MoBAT was replaced by a lighter horizontally hinged breech. The Wombat was mounted on a small two-wheeled carriage, which was removable in order to be moved over obstacles and then locked to the carriage again. The weapon was normally carried in the rear of a specially adapted Land Rover (Portee). The Wombat could also be mounted on the FV432/40 armoured personnel carrier.

The usual round for Wombat was a HESH, which it could fire out to around 1,800 m. The HESH round could defeat 400 mm (16 in) of armour. Other ammunition types include the canister and modified canister rounds. The latter released flechettes, or small darts, giving a "shotgun" effect. These rounds could be used against infantry in the open. The base of the BAT cartridge case was frangible, the reaction gases venting directly backwards through a single large venturi. This was in contrast to the US recoilless designs, which used a frangible sidewall to the cartridge case and multiple venturi.

During the Cold War era, NATO and British Royal Marine forces used the Swedish made Snow Trac as a carrier for the L6 Wombat in the snow-covered mountains of Norway.

Wombats were among the anti-tank weapons taken by the Parachute Regiment to the Falklands War in 1982, but they were not off-loaded from the transport ships.

== Operators ==
Non British users of the MOBAT variant were Jordan, Kenya, Malaysia and New Zealand. Australia used the WOMBAT variant.

== Variants ==
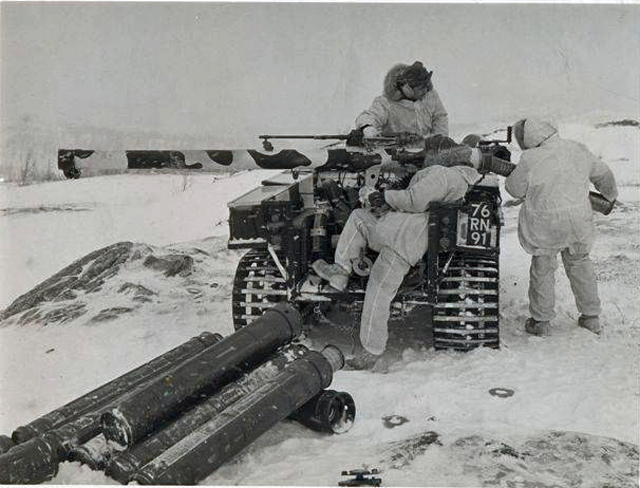
L6 Wombat being prepared for firing during winter training

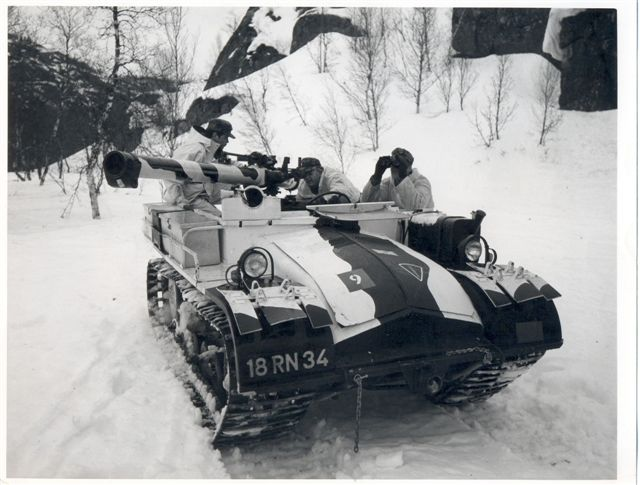
Royal Marines Wombat outfitted Snow Trac on patrol in Norway

- L2 BAT, Battalion Anti Tank

The original towed gun complete with a heavy armoured shield and wheeled mount. Accepted for service in 1953.

- L4 MoBAT (Mobile BAT): A BAT with the shield removed to lighten it (even though it still weighed some 770 kg (0.76 long tons) and a spotting weapon (a Bren light machine gun) added. It could be towed by an Austin Champ or, later, a Land Rover.
- L6 WOMBAT (Note: In Men against Tanks, author John Weeks states the name "Wombat" was a reference to the animal and had nothing to do with magnesium)

A new build weapon with a lightweight carriage, which meant that it was usable by all air Mobile (Infantry Battalions) plus mobile troops, such as the Parachute Regiment and Royal Marine Commandos. It was also fitted to vehicles, such as the FV432 or a 3/4 ton portee Land Rover. When fitted with an M8C .50 cal spotting rifle, which fired a zirconium-tipped spotter tracer round visible past 2,000 yards, it could engage targets out to 2,000 m (2,200 yd). The strike was observed by the No. 1, who called the fall of shot. The No. 2 maintained the spotting rifle and observed the back blast area. The WOMBAT entered service in 1964, rapidly replacing earlier versions in service with the regular army; but it never fully replaced MOBAT and CONBAT with infantry units of the Territorial Army.

- L7 CONBAT ("Converted BAT")

A conversion of the L4 MoBAT or L2 BAT utilizing a L40A1 12.7 mm spotting rifle. (The American designation was the .50-cal M8C spotting rifle. It used a shorter cartridge than the .50-cal machine gun.) The tracer rounds matched trajectory with the CONBAT to 350 m.
