= B-10 recoilless rifle =

Soviet recoilless gun

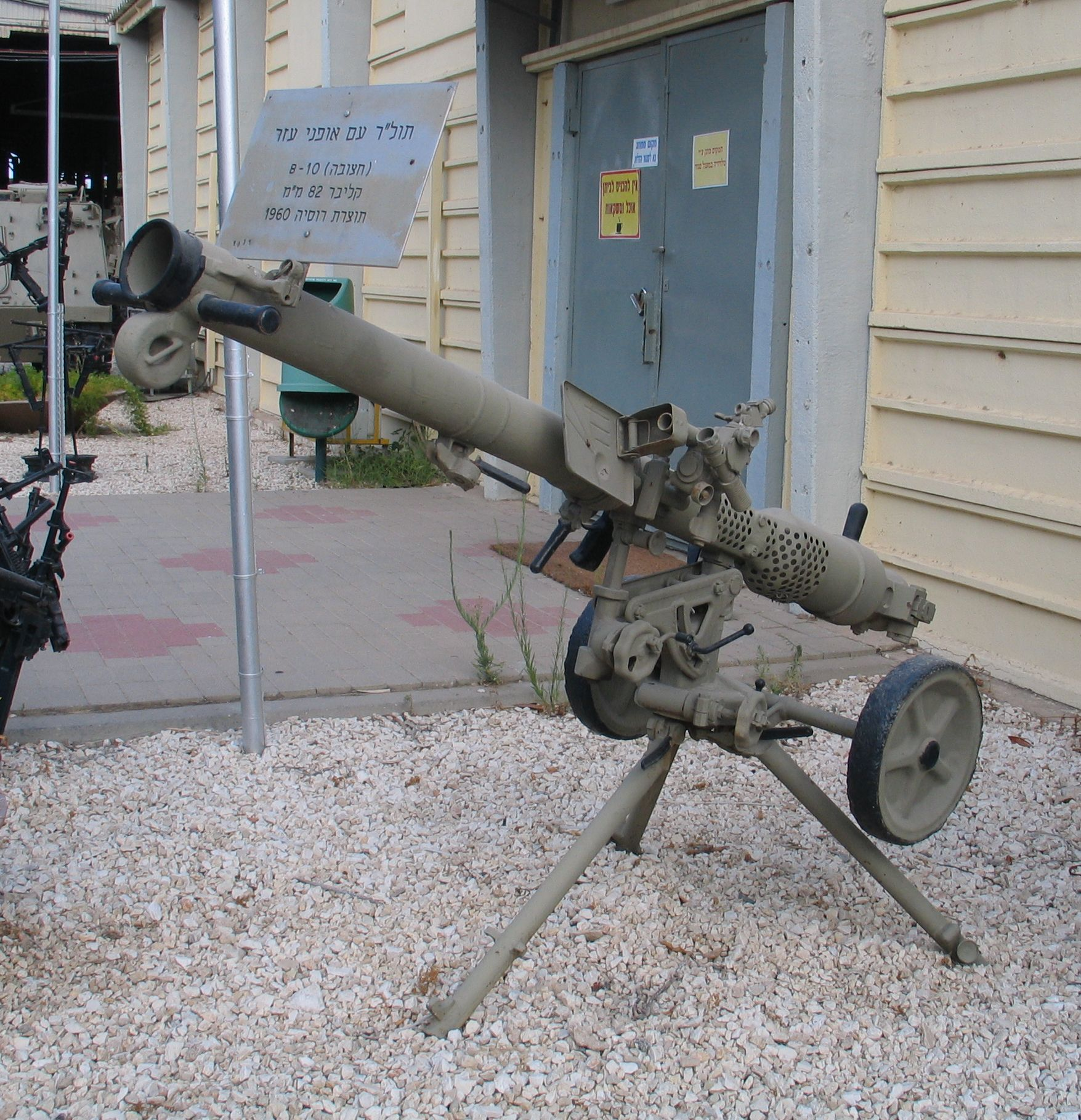
- B-10 recoilless rifle in Batey ha-Osef Museum, Israel.
- Type: Recoilless rifle
- Place of origin: Soviet Union

Service history
- In service: 1954–1980s (USSR)
- Used by: Soviet Union other users
- Wars: Vietnam War; Cambodian Civil War; Laotian Civil War; Yom Kippur War; Portuguese Colonial War; Lebanese Civil War; Western Sahara War; Angolan Civil War; Lord's Resistance Army insurgency Iran–Iraq War; Somali Civil War; Gulf War; Third Sudanese Civil War; Libyan Civil War; Syrian Civil War; War in Iraq (2013-2017); Yemeni Civil War (2014-present); Houthi–Saudi Arabian conflict Sudanese civil war (2023-present); 2025 Afghanistan–Pakistan conflict

Production history
- Designer: KBM (Kolomna)
- Variants: Type 65

Specifications
- Mass: 85.3 kg (188 lbs); 71.7 kg (158 lbs) without wheels
- Length: 1.85 m (6 ft) travel position
- Barrel length: 1.66 m (5 ft 5 in)
- Crew: 4
- Caliber: 82 mm (3.22 in)
- Action: Single shot
- Carriage: Two wheeled with integrated tripod
- Elevation: -20/+35°
- Traverse: 250° in each direction for 360 total.
- Rate of fire: 5 to 7 rpm
- Effective firing range: 400 m (437 yds)
- Maximum firing range: 4,500 m (4,921 yds)
- Feed system: Breech loaded
- Sights: Optical (PBO-2)

The B-10 recoilless rifle (Bezotkatnojie orudie-10, known as the RG82 in East Germany) is a Soviet 82 mm smoothbore recoilless gun. It could be carried on the rear of a BTR-50 armoured personnel carrier. It was a development of the earlier SPG-82, and entered Soviet service during 1954. It was phased out of service in the Soviet Army in the 1960s and replaced by the SPG-9, remaining in service with parachute units at least until the 1980s. Although now obsolete it was used by many countries during the Cold War.

== Description ==
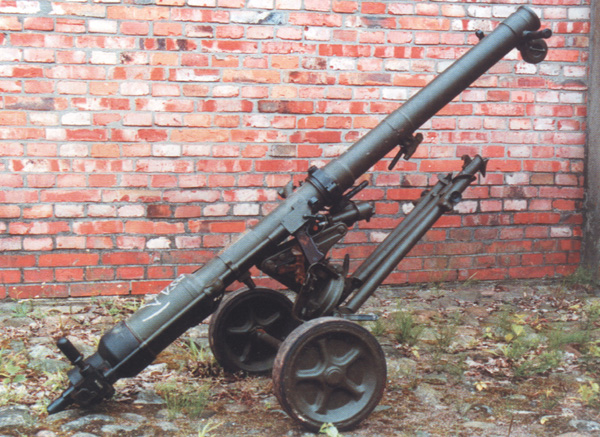
Polish Army B-10 recoilless gun

The weapon consists of a large barrel, with a PBO-2 sight mounted to the left. It is mounted on a small carriage, which has two large wheels, which can be removed. The carriage has an integrated tripod, from which the weapon is normally fired. A small wheel is fitted to the front of the barrel to prevent it touching the ground while being towed. It is normally towed by vehicle, although it can be towed by its four-man crew for short distances using the tow handle fitted to either side of the muzzle.

The tripod can be deployed in two positions providing either a good field of fire or a low silhouette. Rounds are inserted into the weapon through the breech, and percussion fired using a pistol grip to the right of the barrel. The PBO-2 optical sight has a 5.5x zoom direct fire sight, and a 2.5x zoom sight for indirect fire.

== Variants ==
- Type 65 – Chinese version that weighs only 28.2 kg with a tripod mount and no wheels.
- Type 65-1 – Chinese lightenend version (26 kg)
- Type 78 - Chinese lightened version
- RG 82 – East Germany version

== Ammunition ==
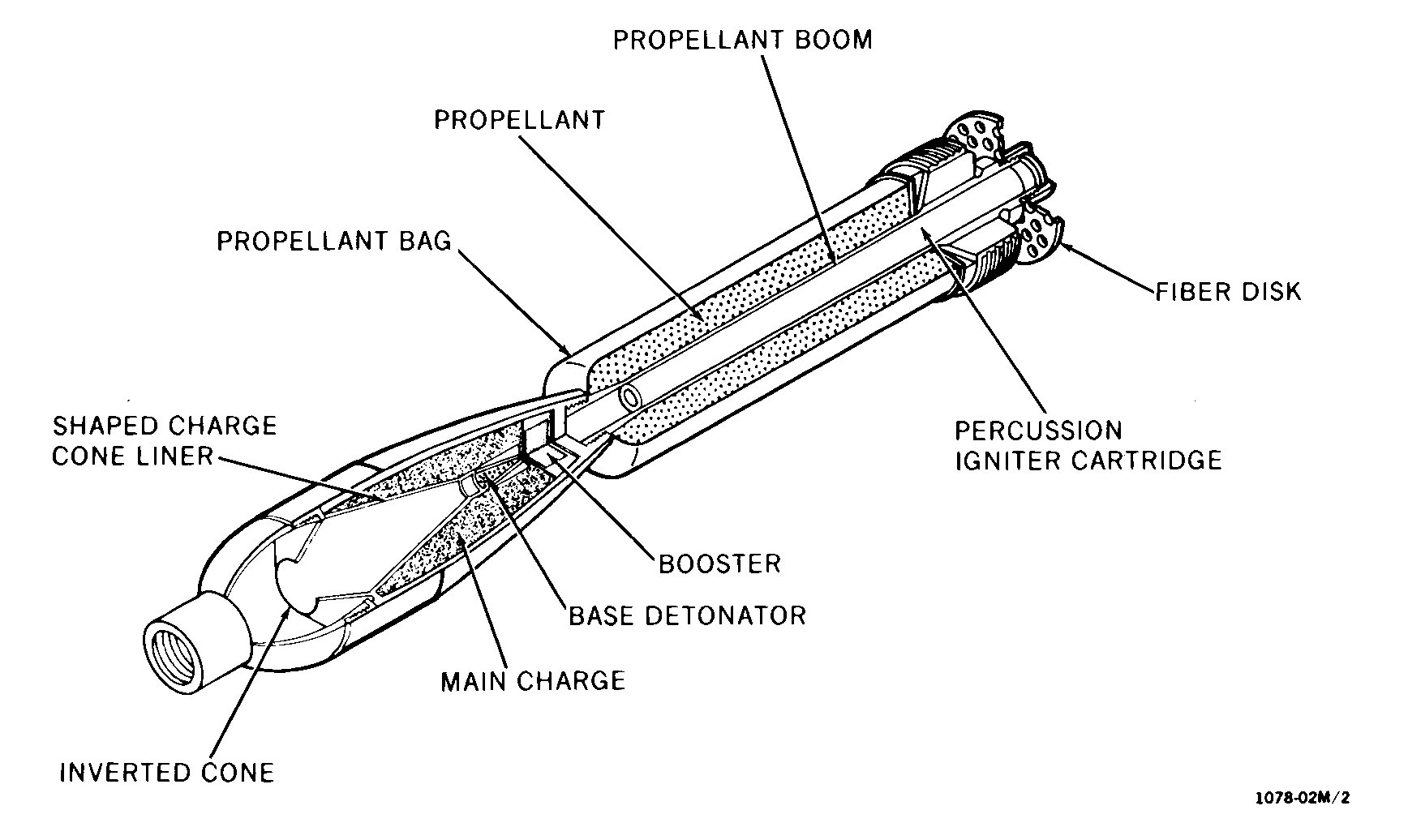
A cutaway BK-881 HEAT round.

- BK-881 – HEAT-FS 3.87 kg. 0.46 kg of RDX. GK-2 PIBD fuze.
- BK-881M – HEAT-FS 4.11 kg. 0.54 kg of RDX. GK-2M PDIBD fuze. 240 mm versus RHA. Muzzle velocity 322 m/s.
- O-881A – HE-FRAG 3.90 kg. 0.46 kg of TNT/dinitronaphthalene. GK-2 fuze. Muzzle velocity 320 m/s. Indirect fire maximum range 4500 m.
- Type 65 (Chinese) – HEAT 3.5 kg. 356 mm versus RHA. Muzzle velocity 240 m/s.
- Type 65 (Chinese) – HE-FRAG 4.6 kg. Warhead contains approx 780 balls – lethal radius 20 m. Muzzle velocity 175 m/s. Max range 1750 m.

== Users ==
- Afghanistan
  - Taliban
- Algeria: 120 as of 2016
- Angola
- Bulgaria
- Cambodia
- Chad
- China
- Egypt
- Ethiopia
- Guinea
- Guinea-Bissau
- Iran
- Iraq
- Libya
- Mozambique
- Myanmar: Copy producing as MA-14.
- Namibia
- Nicaragua
- North Korea: 1,700 as of 2016
- Pakistan
- Palestine Liberation Organization
- Poland
- SADR
- Somalia
- Sudan
- Syria
  - (Syria) Free Syrian Army
- Togo: Type 65 variant
- Vietnam: B-10 and Type 65 variants
- Yemen

=== Non-state users ===
- Islamic State
- Lord's Resistance Army
- Sudan People's Liberation Movement-North
- (South Sudan) Sudan People's Liberation Movement-in-Opposition

=== Former operators ===
- East Germany
- Soviet Union

== See also ==
- B-11 recoilless rifle
