= Mel Bernie Company =

Jewelry company

- Trade name: 1928 Jewelry Company
- Company type: Private
- Industry: Jewelry manufacturing
- Founded: Los Angeles, California (1968)
- Founder: Melvyn Bernie
- Headquarters: Burbank, California, United States
- Key people: Melvyn Bernie
- Products: Jewelry
- Owner: Melvyn Bernie
- Number of employees: 50 (2013)
- Website: 1928.com

The Mel Bernie Company, trading as 1928 Jewelry Company (and sometimes referred to simply as "1928 Jewelry") is a manufacturer and wholesaler of costume jewelry and novelties. They also distribute their products directly to consumers through their website.

== Company information ==
The 1928 Jewelry Company was founded by Melvyn Bernie in 1968. Today, it is one of the largest and last standing jewelry manufacturers in the U.S. The company specializes in reproductions and interpretations of antique jewelry designs. It is located in Burbank, California and has about 250 employees as of 2013. It is a privately held company.

== Environmental issues ==
In 1993, The Mel Bernie Company reportedly discharged 250 pounds of toxic copper compounds into groundwater and was included in a United States Environmental Protection Agency (EPA) report, based on 1995 data, as a "large quantity generator of hazardous waste".

In 2000, the company entered into a consent decree with the California Department of Toxic Substances Control (DTSC). The Department had accused the Mel Bernie Company of illegally polluting runoff water with cyanide and other toxic byproducts of jewelry manufacture. The Mel Bernie Company, without admitting any violation, agreed to ensure that its operations would comply with state regulations in future, initiate inspection procedures, and train employees in toxic waste handling.

In 2002, the California DTSC obtained an enforcement order after a 2001 inspection found eight violations of state environmental law at the Mel Bernie Company, including keeping a leaking hazardous waste tank in operation and keeping toxic substances in improperly labeled containers.

In 2005, the company reached a settlement with the California DTSC to resolve a dispute regarding the 2002 enforcement decree. Again without admitting any violation, the Mel Bernie Company again agreed to train employees in toxic waste handling and to pay an additional fine of $25,000US. Company has corrected all violations noted during the inspection.
