= SPG-9 =

Soviet recoilless gun

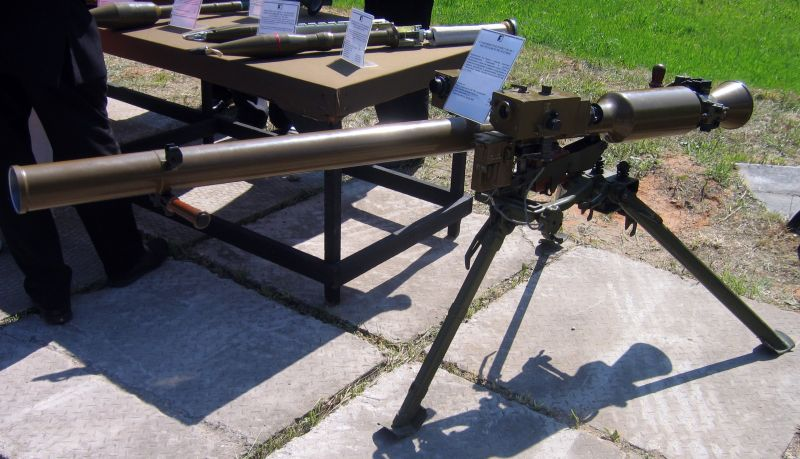
- A Russian SPG-9M
- Type: Recoilless gun Anti-tank gun
- Place of origin: Soviet Union

Service history
- In service: 1962–present
- Wars: Vietnam War; Iran–Iraq War; Salvadoran Civil War; Lord's Resistance Army insurgency Gulf War; Lebanese Civil War; Iraq War; Second Sudanese Civil War; Third Sudanese Civil War; Libyan Civil Wars; Northern Mali conflict Syrian Civil War; War in Iraq (2013-2017); War in Donbas; Yemeni Civil War (2014–present); Saudi Arabian-led intervention in Yemen; 2022 Kyrgyzstan–Tajikistan clashes Russo-Ukraine War; Gaza war

Specifications
- Mass: 47.5 kg (105 lb); 59.5 kg (131 lb) with tripod
- Length: 2.11 m (6 ft 11 in)
- Width: 99 cm (3 ft 3 in) allowing full traverse
- Height: 80 cm (2 ft 7 in)
- Crew: 2 (1 gunner, 1 loader)
- Caliber: 73 mm (2.9 in) smoothbore
- Breech: Interrupted screw
- Recoil: None
- Carriage: Tripod
- Elevation: +7°/−3°
- Traverse: 30° total
- Rate of fire: 5–6 rounds per minute
- Muzzle velocity: 250–435 m/s (820–1,430 ft/s)
- Effective firing range: 800 m (870 yd)
- Maximum firing range: 1,200–6,500 m (1,300–7,100 yd)
- Feed system: Manually breech-loaded
- Sights: PGO-9 optical 4× sight or PGN-9 IR and passive night sight

The SPG-9 "Kop'yo" (Russian: СПГ-9 «Копьё», станковый противотанковый гранатомет, romanized: stankovyi protivotankovyi granatomet, lit. 'Easel Anti-tank Grenade Launcher "Spear"') is a tripod-mounted man-portable, 73mm caliber recoilless gun developed by the Soviet Union. It fires fin-stabilized, rocket-assisted high explosive (HE) and high-explosive anti-tank (HEAT) shaped charge projectiles similar to those fired by the 73mm 2A28 Grom low pressure gun of the BMP-1 armored vehicle. It was accepted into service in 1962, replacing the B-10 recoilless rifle.

== Description ==
The projectile is launched from the gun by a small charge, which gives it an initial velocity of between 250–400 metres per second (820–1,310 ft/s). The launch charge also imparts spin to the projectile by a series of offset holes. Once the projectile has traveled approximately 20 metres (66 ft) from the launcher, a rocket motor in its base ignites. For the PG-9 projectile, this takes it to a velocity of 700 metres per second (2,300 ft/s) before the motor burns out.

The SPG-9 is heavy, ~60 kilograms (130 lb), and normally transported by vehicle, and carried into position by its two person crew. It can be deployed in about a minute. The weapon is in service with a large number of armed forces, and a variety of ammunition is produced; however, they are mostly copies of the original Soviet PG-9 HEAT and OG-9 fragmentation high explosive (Frag-HE) rounds.

The SPG-9 is widely available to maritime pirates, such as in the Horn of Africa region, and in other regions to a lesser degree. It is not as popular as the RPG-7 because it must be mounted on a vehicle or boat and cannot be easily carried and shoulder fired. The SPG-9 requires much more skill to fire accurately than the RPG-7. There have been reports of these mounted in skiffs and larger "mother ships". The SPG-9 can typically be found mounted on a wide variety of vehicles known as "technicals" in Somalia.

A variant for use with airborne troops including detachable wheels was built as the SPG-9D.

== Combat use ==
The SPG-9 was used by both sides during the Transnistria War.

In addition to using the SPG-9 as light indirect fire artillery, members of Wagner PMC modified SPG-9 ammunition to be fired from more portable RPG-7 launchers during the Battle of Bakhmut.

In mid October 2023 Israeli forces, during the Gaza war, captured a flyer produced by Hamas about destroying Merkava tanks. The flyer recommended the SPG-9 as an effective way of defeating the Israeli Trophy System designed to intercept incoming RPG or Anti-tank Guided Missiles. The SPG-9 was recommended due "simply by virtue of its projectile’s high speed".

== Projectiles ==
Round (projectile)	Type	Weight (kg)	Fuze	Length (mm)	Explosive content (kg)	Muzzle velocity (m/s)	Effective range (m)	Maximum range (m)	Armour penetration (mm)	Notes
PG-9 (PG-9V)	HEAT-FS	4.39	VP-9	920	0.322 (hexogen)	435	800	1,300	300	—
PG-9N	HEAT-FS		VP-9	920	0.340 (OKFOL-3.5)	435	800	1,300	400	—
PG-9VS	HEAT-FS	4.4	?	920	?		1,300	?	400	-
PG-9VNT (PG-9NT)	HEAT-FS	3.2	?	920	?	400	700	1,200	600 or 450 behind ERA	Tandem-charge
OG-9V (OG-9)	FRAG-HE	5.35	GO-2 or O-4M	1062	0.735 (TNT)	316	–	–	n/a	Cast iron casing
OG-9VM (OG-9M)	FRAG-HE	5.35	GO-2 or O-4M	1062	0.655 (TD-50)	316	–	–	n/a	—
OG-9VM1 (OG-9V)	FRAG-HE	5.35	GO-2 or O-4M	1062	?	316	–	4,500	n/a	—
OG-9BG (OG-9G)	FRAG-HE	6.9	O-4M	1030	0.750	316	–	7,500	n/a	Bulgarian made
OG-9BG1 (OG-9G1)	FRAG-HE	5.48	O-4M	1024	0.750	250	–	4,200	n/a	Bulgarian made

== Users ==
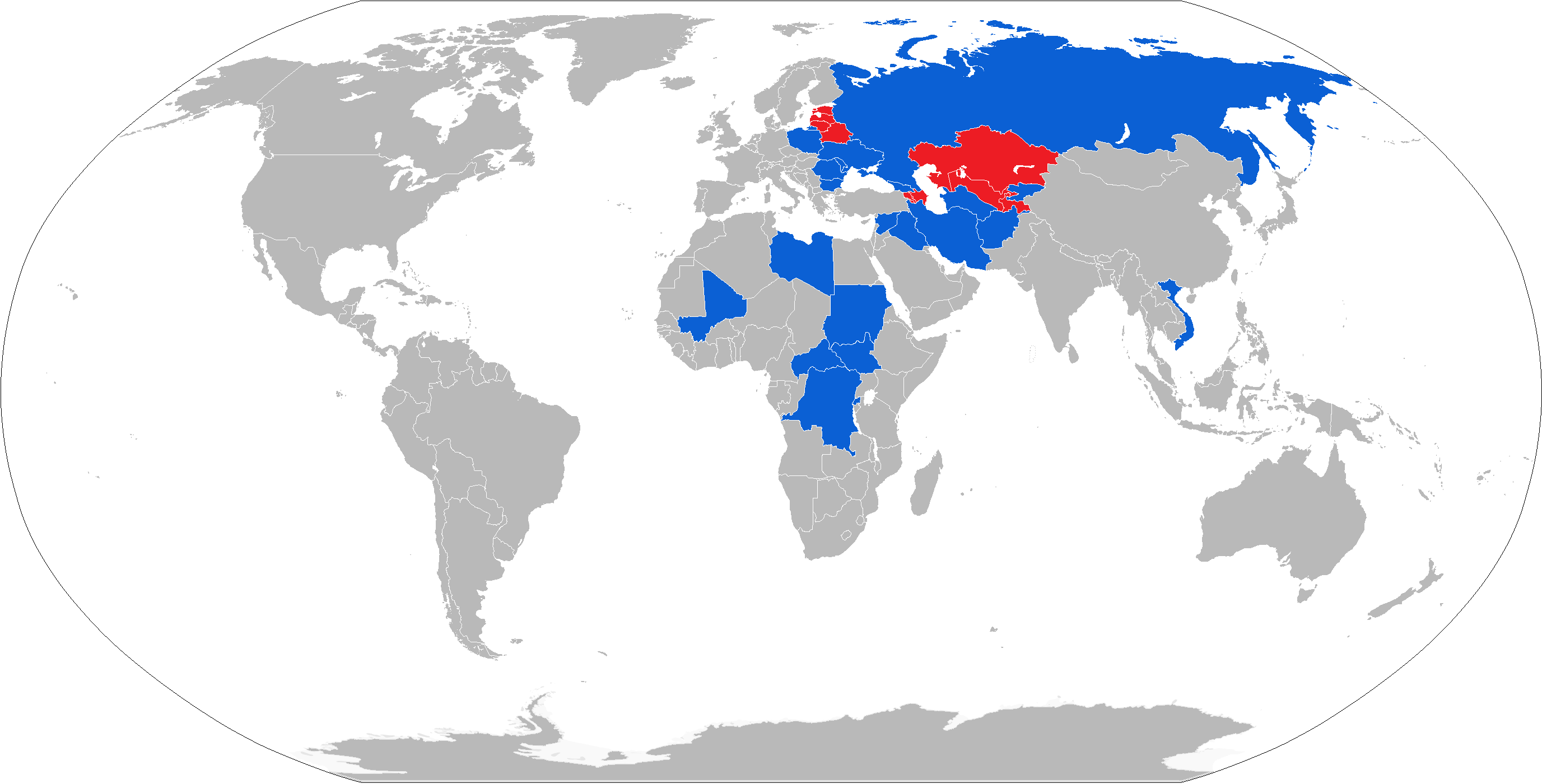
Map with SPG-9 users in blue

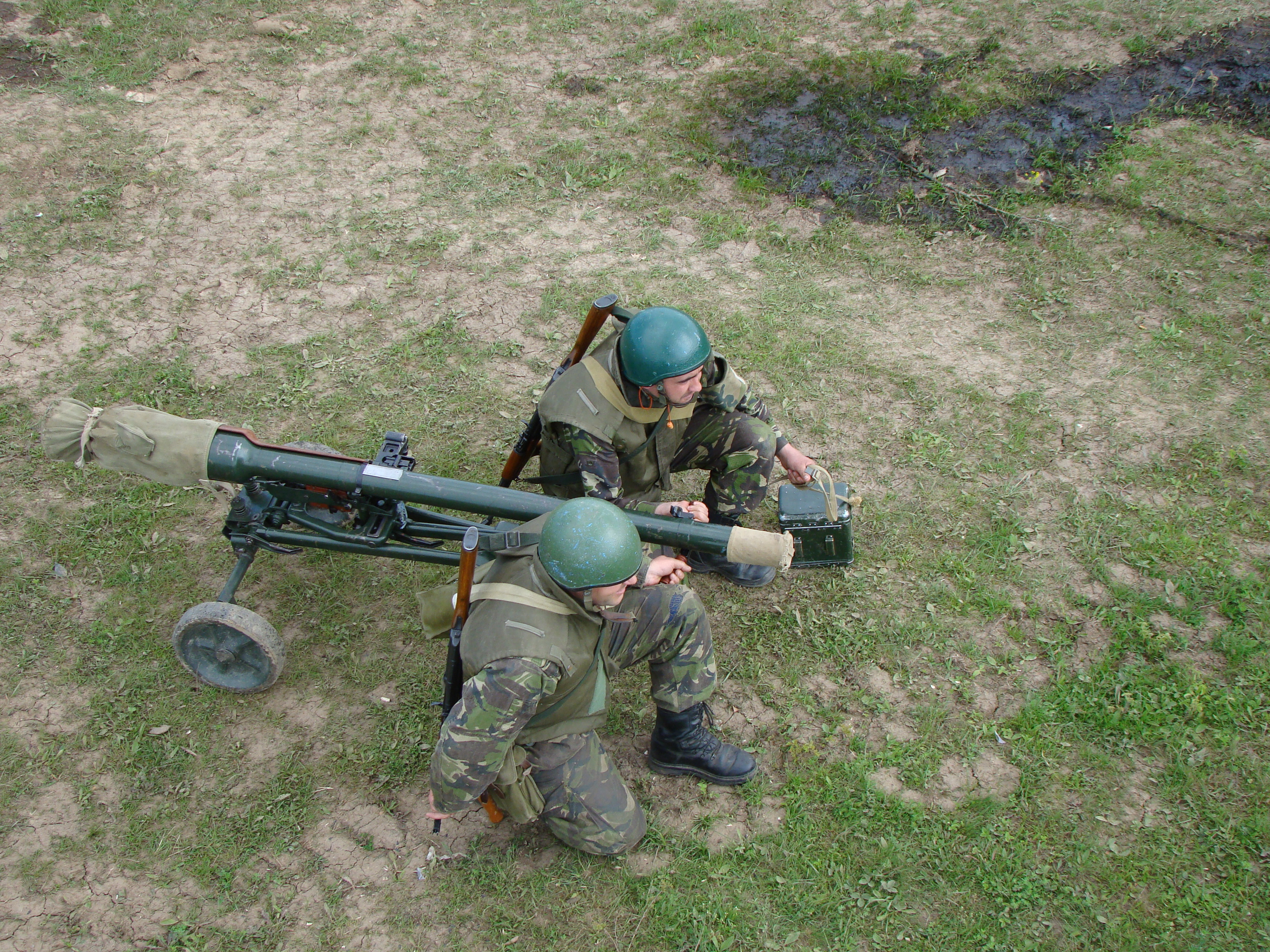
Romanian soldiers with an AG-9 (license built SPG-9) in traveling position.

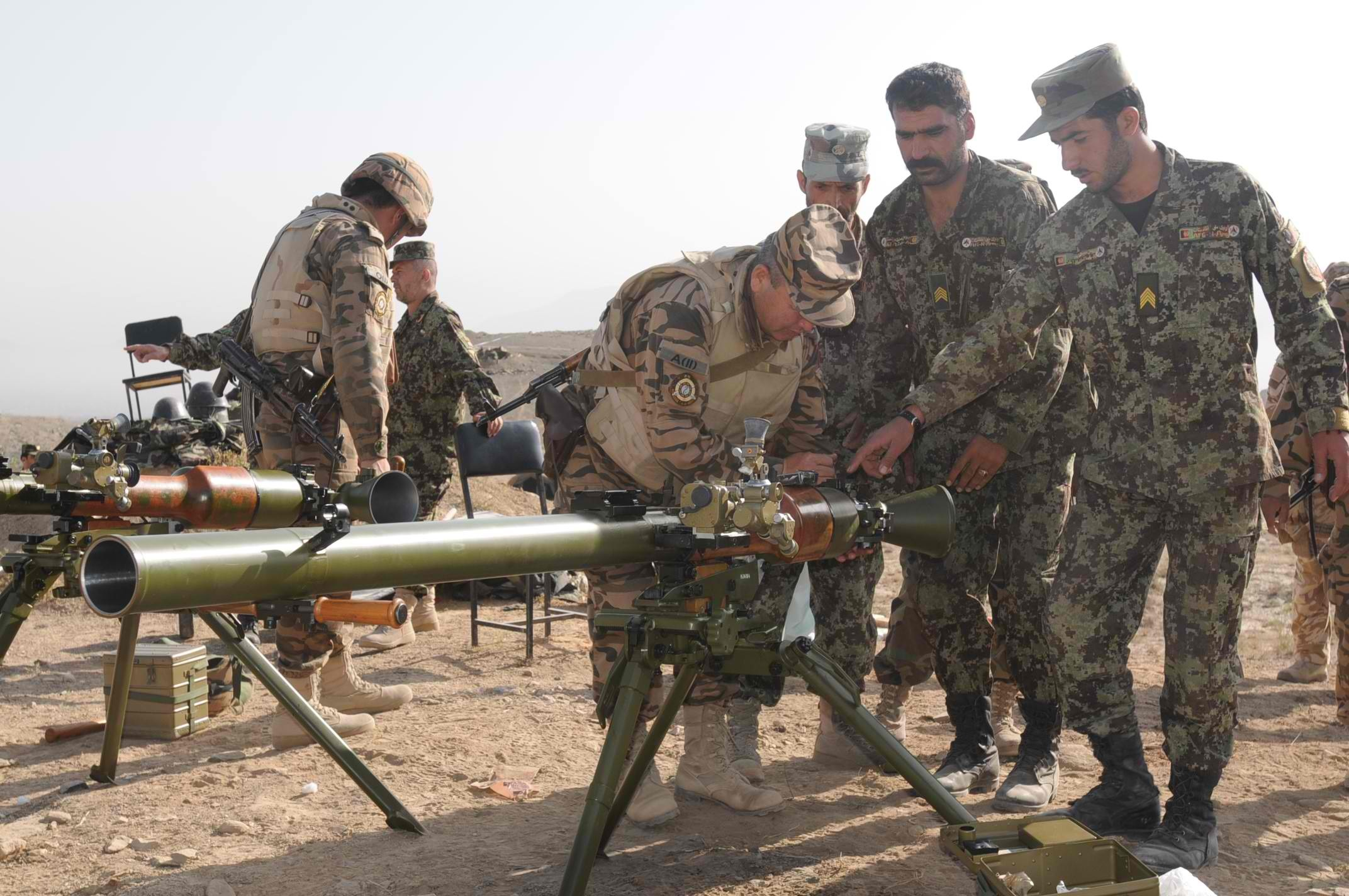
A Mongolian Mobile Training Team member reviews the SPG-9 recoilless gun with Afghan National Army soldiers prior to a live-fire weapons demonstration, September 2, 2012, at the Camp Scenic weapons range near the Darulaman Infantry School in Kabul, Afghanistan. The MTT specialize in SPG-9 recoilless rifle systems and train ANA soldiers at the infantry school.

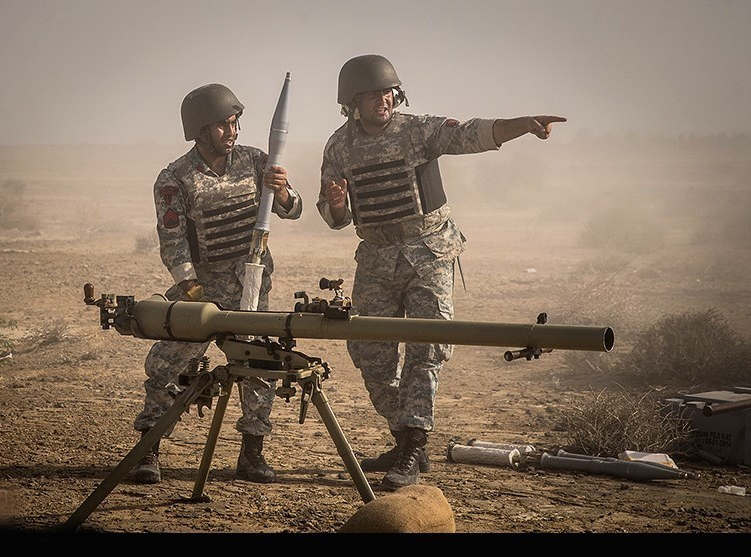
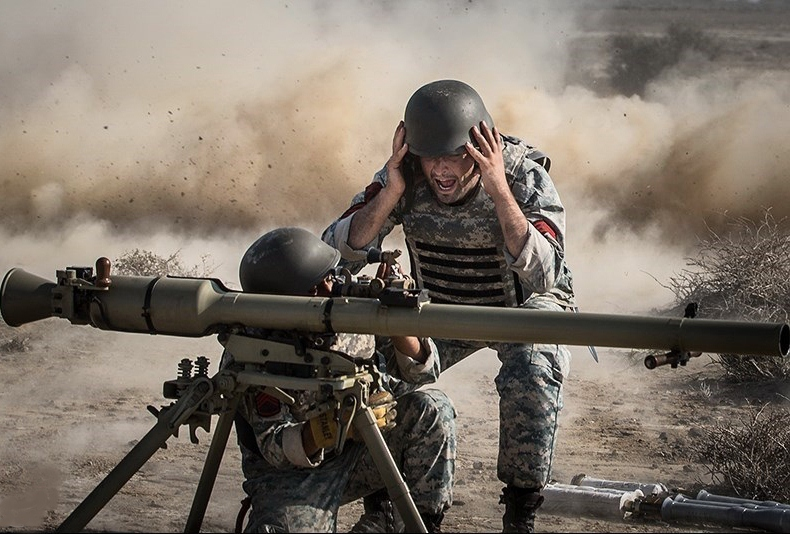
Marines of the Iranian Navy using SPG-9. Velayat 94 military exercise
- Afghanistan
- Bulgaria : manufactured locally as Arsenal ATGL
- Central African Republic
- Cambodia
- Democratic Republic of the Congo
- Egypt
- Georgia
- East Germany
- Iran: AMIG SPG-9
- Iraq
- Kyrgyzstan
- Libya
- Mali
- Moldova
- Poland
- Romania: RomArm AG-9
- Russia
- Rwanda
- Sudan
- South Sudan
- Ba'athist Syria
- Syria
- Ukraine, also used by separatist forces
- Vietnam SPG-9T2
- Turkmenistan

=== Non-state actors ===
- Iraqi Kurdistan
- Islamic State
- Lord's Resistance Army
- Kurdistan Workers' Party
- Sudan People's Liberation Movement-in-Opposition
- Sudan People's Liberation Movement-North
- Free Syrian Army
- Transnistria
- Hamas

== See also ==
- SPG-82
