= Ordnance, RCL, 3.45 in =

British recoilless rifle

Ordnance, RCL, 3.45 in Mk 1
- Type: Recoilless rifle
- Place of origin: United Kingdom

Service history
- Used by: United Kingdom

Production history
- Designer: Dennis Burney
- Manufacturer: Broadway Trust Company

Specifications
- Mass: 75 lb (34 kg)
- Barrel length: 5 ft 8 in (1.73 m) L/14.75
- Shell: HESH
- Shell weight: 16 lb 4 oz (7.4 kg)
- Calibre: 3.45 in (88 mm)
- Muzzle velocity: 600 ft/s (180 m/s)
- Effective firing range: 1,000 yd (910 m)

The 3.45 inch RCL was an 88 mm British recoilless weapon, designed by Sir Dennis Burney during the Second World War. Delayed by problems due to breech wear because of gas erosion upon firing, it did not see action, as was hoped, in the Far East, particularly Burma. However, it did lead to the post-war Mobat and Wombat recoilless rifles.

== History ==
Burney was privy to the design of the 20mm m/42, a recoilless rifle designed by the Swedish Bofors Carl Gustaf company during World War II, but it had little bearing on his work as the Carl Gustav was a large bore rifle design intended to remove the recoil experienced with anti-tank rifles such as the Boys anti-tank rifle or similar large calibre bolt-action rifles which required large cartridges to deliver high-velocity rounds. The usefulness of anti-tank rifles was lost as tanks were built with much thicker armour during the war. Although Burney's designs did not have high muzzle velocities, this was compensated for by the use of a shell which relied on a HESH explosive instead of speed and weight to penetrate the armour.

Burney founded the Broadway Trust Company for the production of the gun.

== Design ==
This was a weapon that could be fired from the shoulder, giving unrestricted traverse or elevation within the limits of the human frame, or mounted on a simple tripod. A portion of the propelling charge bled through holes in the cartridge wall and into a space around the breech and then backwards through four venturis. This counterblast backwards cancelled out the recoil.

== Specification ==
Ordnance, RCL, 3.45in Mk 1

- Weight: 75 pounds (34 kg)
- Length: 68.55 inches (174.1 cm)
- Barrel length: 14.75 calibres
- Muzzle velocity: 600 ft/second (180 m/s)
- Range: 1,000 yards (910 m)
- Ammunition: Cartridge RCL, 3.45 inch WB ("Wallbuster") 3.45 inches (8.8 cm)
  - Type: HESH
  - Propellant: 11.125 pounds (5.046 kg) cordite
  - Filling : plastic explosive
  - Weight (complete round): 16.25 pounds (7.37 kg)
