= Duthoit Point =

Location of Nelson Island in the South Shetland Islands.

Duthoit Point (62°18′42″S 58°49′47″W) is a point which forms the eastern tip of Nelson Island, in the South Shetland Islands. The point appears on charts dating back to 1822. It was recharted by Discovery Investigations, 1934–35, and named after Arthur Duthoit, a draftsman in the Admiralty Hydrographic Office at the time.
