= Streamline Cars =

Automobile marque

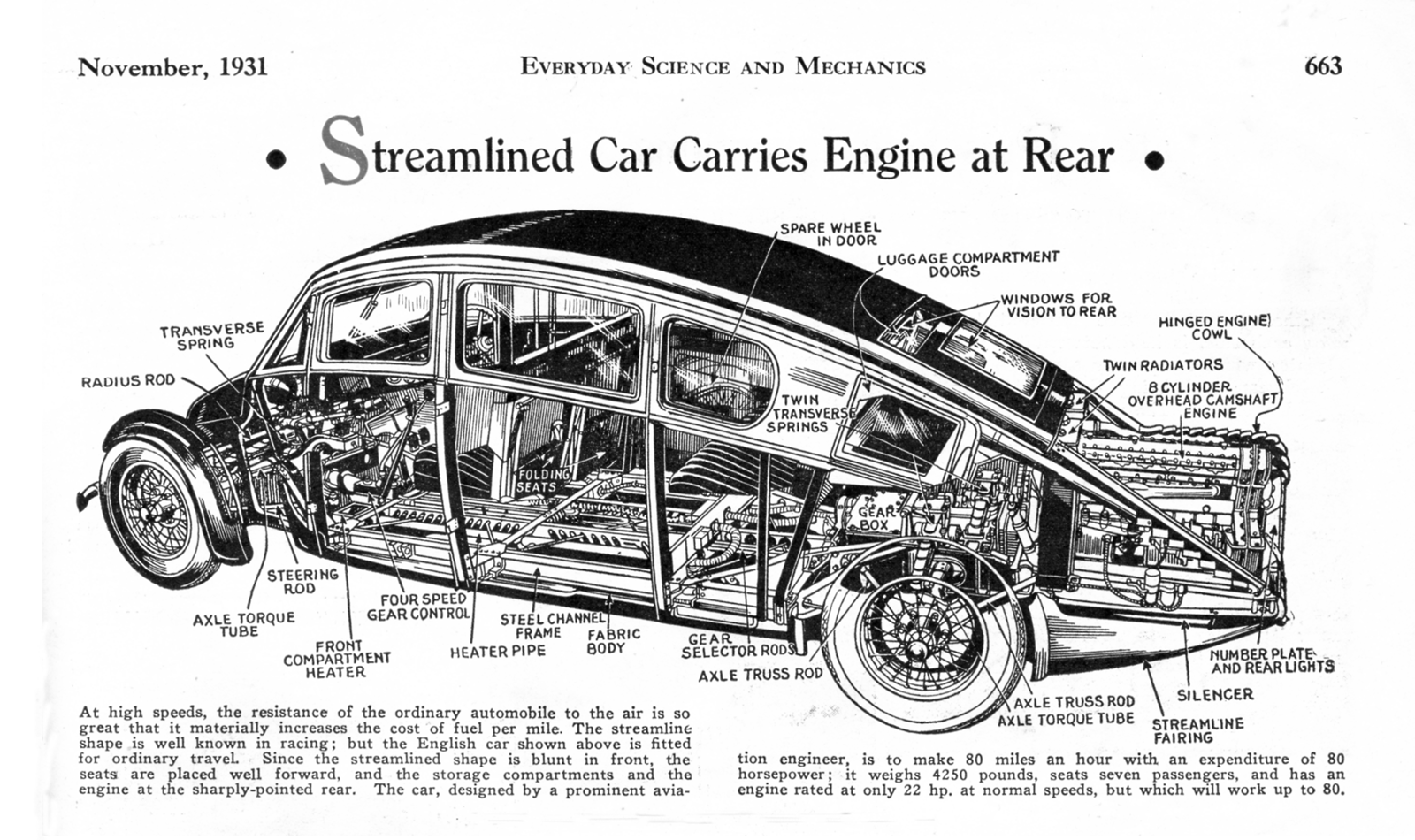
The Streamline Car in an American Magazine

Streamline Cars Ltd was the company responsible for making the Burney car designed by Dennis Burney.

Sir Dennistoun Burney rose to fame as an airship designer, best known for his work at Howden on the R100 for Vickers. Starting in 1927, thirteen cars were made at Maidenhead. Each was different, as they were intended as showcases for his patents rather than for serious production.

== Engine and running gear ==
The cars incorporated such features as independent suspension, hydraulic brakes, a heater and all seating within the wheelbase. Ignition and other controls operated through flexible cables encased in copper tubing, which followed contemporary aircraft industry practice. The cars were rear-engined with twin radiators. The first car used an Alvis front-wheel-drive chassis effectively turned back-to-front but adapted so the new front wheels steered. Later cars used Beverley straight 8, Lycoming and Armstrong Siddeley engines.

== Body ==
The streamlined bodywork is very long at just under 20 feet (6.1 m). The spare wheel was carried inside one of the rear doors which must have put an enormous strain on the hinges and door pillar. The equivalent space in the opposite door was occupied either by a second spare wheel or a cocktail cabinet. The car's unusual aerodynamic design was eye catching, with very little front overhang, but a long rear overhang (containing the engine). The underside was also covered in sheet metal to enhance aerodynamic efficiency. The Streamline pointed to the future in terms of space efficiency, featuring a seven-seat interior and, even by the standards of the time, excellent headroom, which seems to have been a particular concern for the designer.

== Commercial ==
Each car was priced at around £1,500. A blue one was bought by the Prince of Wales late in 1930, and another crossed the Atlantic to be exhibited at the Detroit Car Show. In total, 12 Streamlines were built between 1929 and 1931, but none appears to have survived. Crossley Motors took out a licence to build the Streamline, producing a further 25 vehicles, of which two survive.

The Straight eight Beverley-Barnes engines in the earlier cars proved to be unreliable, and in the final three cars were replaced by US-built 6-cylinder Lycoming or UK-built Armstrong Siddeley units.

Streamline Cars finally closed in 1936.

== Driving impressions ==
A contemporary report commended the lack of mechanical noise from the driver's seat and the excellence of the ride. The car's considerable weight – 38 cwt or about 1900 kg on the 1930 model – may have been one cause of the clutch-slip reported at 76 mph (about 122 km/h) which was close to the car's claimed maximum. The engine was mounted wholly behind the rear axle, and the car was therefore alarmingly unstable in wet or windy weather.

A remarkable turning circle of 39 ft (12 m) was achieved in spite of the car's length. No two Streamlines were identical and the version tested was "only" 18 ft 7 in (approximately 5.6 meters) long with a 12 ft 5 in (3.8 m) wheelbase which made it unwieldy in restricted spaces. It was longer than the longest available Rolls-Royce and only about £350 cheaper.

== Aftermath ==
Some of the ideas (including the location of the spare wheel) were used by Crossley Motors in their "Streamline" but this also was not a production success. The Maidenhead factory was also used for car production by Marendaz and GWK.

== See also ==
- List of car manufacturers of the United Kingdom
- Streamliner#Automobiles for overview of early aerodynamic automobiles

Early aerodynamic cars, chronologically

- Rumpler Tropfenwagen (1921), first aerodynamic "teardrop" car to be designed and serially produced (about 100 units built)
- Persu car (1922-23), designed by Romanian engineer Aurel Persu, who improved on the Tropfenwagen by placing the wheels inside the car body
- Dymaxion car, 1933 US "teardrop" car
- Tatra T77 (1934), claimed to be the first truly serial-produced aerodynamically-designed automobile
- Chrysler Airflow (1934-37) streamlined car
