= Burney baronets =

Baronetcy in the Baronetage of the United Kingdom

The Burney Baronetcy, of Preston Candover in the County of Southampton, is a title in the Baronetage of the United Kingdom. It was created on 27 January 1921 for Admiral of the Fleet Sir Cecil Burney. He was second-in-command of the Grand Fleet from 1914 to 1916 and Second Sea Lord from 1916 to 1917. He was succeeded by his only son, the second baronet. He was an aeronautical engineer and Conservative politician. His son, the third baronet, was a businessman and a member of the legislative councils of Rhodesia and Zambia. As of 2007 the title is held by the latter's eldest son, the fourth baronet, who succeeded in 2002.

== Burney baronets, of Preston Candover (1921) ==
- Sir Cecil Burney, 1st Baronet (1858–1929)
- Sir (Charles) Dennistoun Burney, 2nd Baronet (1888–1968)
- Sir Cecil Dennistoun Burney, 3rd Baronet (1923–2002)
- Sir Nigel Dennistoun Burney, 4th Baronet (born 1959)

The heir apparent is the present holder's son Max Dennistoun Burney (born 1994).
