= Burnie (surname) =

Burnie is a surname. Notable people with the surname include:

- James Burnie (1882–1975), English businessman and politician
- Robert Burnie (1842–1908), English politician
- Stu Burnie (born 1962), Canadian ice hockey player

== See also ==
- Bernie (surname)
