= Dennistoun Burney =

English engineer and politician

Sir Charles Dennistoun Burney, Bt
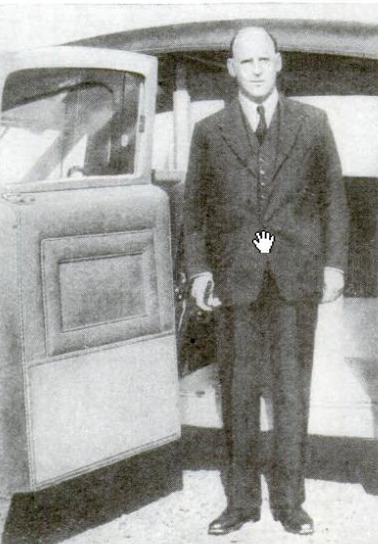
- With Streamline Cars Ltd's Burney car, c. 1930

Member of Parliament for Uxbridge
- In office 15 November 1922 – 10 May 1929
- Preceded by: Sidney Peel
- Succeeded by: John Llewellin

Personal details
- Born: 28 December 1888
- Died: 11 November 1968 (aged 79) Bermuda
- Relatives: Cecil Burney (father), Sybil Neville-Rolfe (sister), Cecil Dennistoun Burney (son)
- Known for: Aeronautical engineer, Member of Parliament, Businessman

Sir Charles Dennistoun Burney, 2nd Baronet CMG (28 December 1888 – 11 November 1968, in Bermuda) was an English aeronautical engineer, private inventor and Conservative Party politician.

== Early military career ==
Burney was the son of Admiral of the Fleet Sir Cecil Burney Bt. He was given a naval education, starting his training at HMS Britannia in 1903, and joining the battleship Exmouth as a midshipman in early 1905. He was posted to the destroyer HMS Crusader in 1909, which was being used for experimental anti-submarine work at the time.

In 1911, he came up with a novel seaplane design using a hydrofoil undercarriage. Further development was carried out by the Bristol and Colonial Aeroplane Company and two prototype designs, the X.2 and X.3, were produced, but were unsuccessful.

On the outbreak of World War I, Burney was given command of the destroyer HMS Velox, but shortly afterwards joined the research establishment at HMS Vernon. There he developed the paravane, an anti-mine device, for which he took out a number of patents in 1916. These were to earn him around £350,000 during the course of the war through their use by foreign merchant fleets. He was appointed CMG in the 1917 Birthday Honours. In 1920 Burney retired from the navy with the rank of lieutenant-commander, and was promoted on the retired list to commander.

== Vickers and parliament ==
Burney then became a consultant with Vickers and came up with a plan for civil airship development which was to be carried out by Vickers with support from the Government. This evolved into the Imperial Airship Scheme which was to result in the R100 and R101 airships: Burney became managing director of the specially formed subsidiary of Vickers that built the R100 airship, where his design team, headed by Barnes Wallis, included Nevil Shute Norway, later to become known as a novelist.

In 1929, he published a book called The World, the Air and the Future.

His private interests led him to set up a company, Streamline Cars Ltd, to build technically advanced aerodynamic rear-engined cars from 1930 to 1934: this was taken up by Crossley Motors.

Burney was Member of Parliament (MP) for Uxbridge from 1922 until he retired in 1929.

== World War II ==
In 1939, Burney was again joined by Nevil Shute in the development of an early air-launched gliding torpedo, the Toraplane, and the Doravane glide bomb. Despite much work and many trials the Toraplane could not be launched with repeatable accuracy and was finally abandoned in 1942. Among other military weapons, he was the inventor of the High Explosive Squash Head (HESH) shell and a British recoilless rifle, the "Burney gun". He demonstrated the advantages of the latter by constructing a recoilless shotgun with a one-inch (25 mm) bore which he was able to shoot with no discomfort from the recoil. During World War II, he led development of a recoilless weapon for the British Army which entered service as Ordnance, RCL, 3.45 in, but too late to see service during the war.

== Family ==
Burney, often called Dennis Burney, was the son of Admiral of the Fleet Sir Cecil Burney Bt. His sister was Sybil Katherine Neville-Rolfe.

In 1921, Burney married Gladys High, who was originally from Chicago. They had a son in 1923, Cecil Dennistoun Burney. Dennis Burney succeeded to the Baronetcy when his father died in 1929. His son succeeded his father in the Burney baronetcy in 1968.

Parliament of the United Kingdom
Preceded by Hon. Sidney Peel	Member of Parliament for Uxbridge; 1922–1929	Succeeded by John Llewellin
Baronetage of the United Kingdom
Preceded by Cecil Burney	Baronet of Preston Candover; 1929–1968	Succeeded by Cecil Dennistoun Burney
