= Bernard =

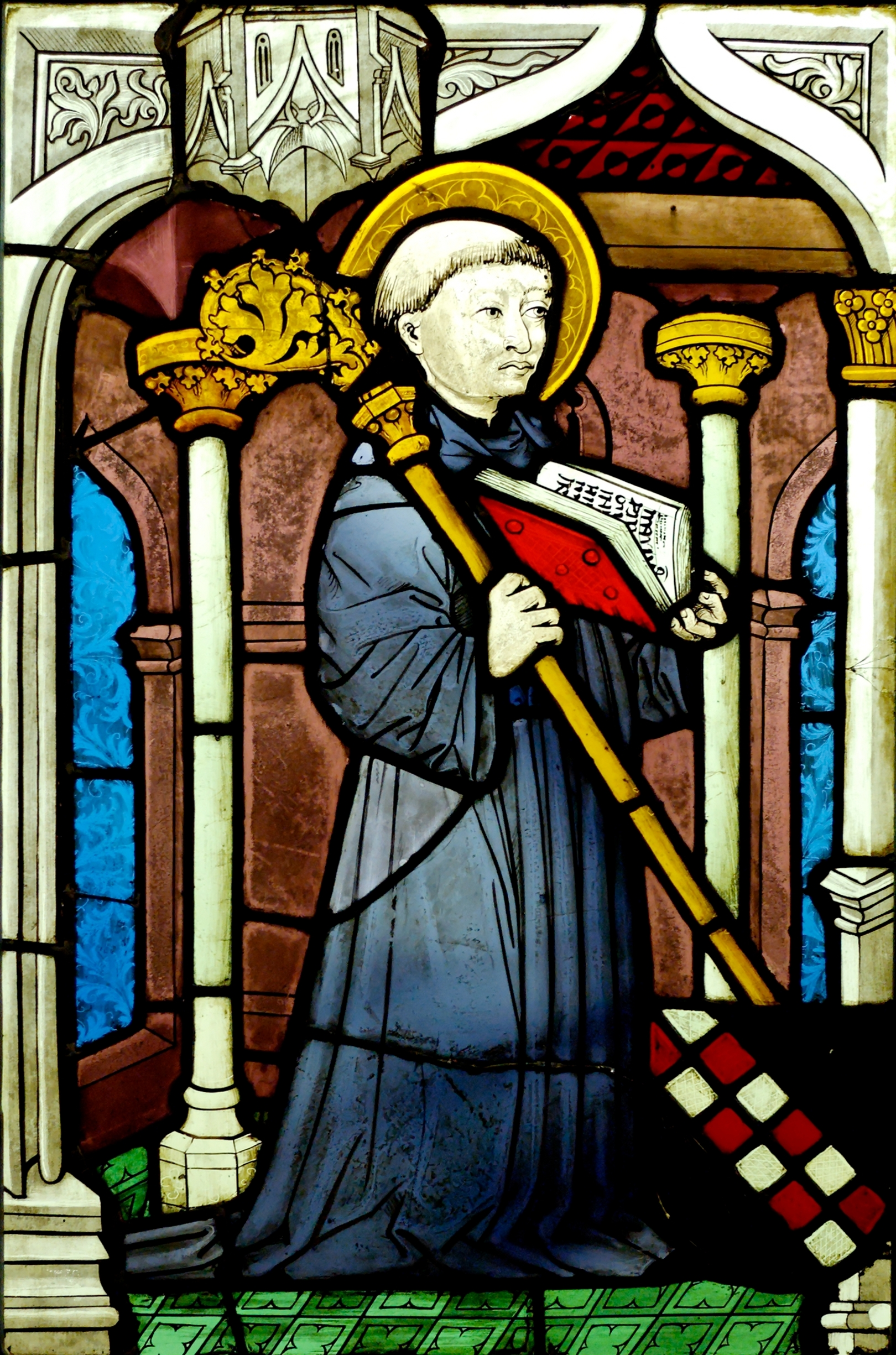
- Bernard of Clairvaux (Saint Bernard)
- Pronunciation: mainly UK: /ˈbɜːrnərd/ or /ˈbɜːrnəd/ mainly US: /bərˈnɑːrd/ French: [bɛʁ.naʁ] Dutch: [ˈbɛrnɑrt]
- Gender: masculine

Origin
- Language: West Germanic
- Meaning: Brave as a bear
- Region of origin: medieval Europe

Other names
- Related names: Bernie, Barnard, Bernardas, Bearnárd, Bernardo, Beñat, Bernhard, Bernhardt, Bernd, Bernt, Bernadetta, Bernadette, Berend, Pearu, Pääru

Bernard (Bernhard) is a French and West Germanic masculine given name. It has West Germanic origin and is also a surname.

The name is attested from at least the 9th century. West Germanic Bernhard is composed from the two elements bern "bear" and hard "brave, hardy". Its native Old English cognate was Beornheard, which was replaced or merged with the French form Bernard that was brought to England after the Norman Conquest. The name Bernhard was notably popular among Old Frisian speakers. Its wider use was popularized due to Saint Bernhard of Clairvaux (canonized in 1174). In Ireland, the name was an anglicized form of Brian.

== Geographical distribution ==
Bernard is the second most common surname in France.

As of 2014, 42.2% of all known bearers of the surname Bernard were residents of France (frequency 1:392), 12.5% of the United States (1:7,203), 7.0% of Haiti (1:382), 6.6% of Tanzania (1:1,961), 4.8% of Canada (1:1,896), 3.6% of Nigeria (1:12,221), 2.7% of Burundi (1:894), 1.9% of Belgium (1:1,500), 1.6% of Rwanda (1:1,745), 1.2% of Germany (1:16,397), 1.2% of Jamaica (1:595), 1.1% of Ghana (1:6,179), 1.0% of England (1:13,691) and 1.0% of Madagascar (1:6,098).

In France, the frequency of the surname was higher than national average (1:392) in the following regions:

1. Collectivity of Saint Martin (1:60)
2. Saint Barthélemy (1:189)
3. Bourgogne-Franche-Comté (1:260)
4. Nouvelle-Aquitaine (1:283)
5. Auvergne-Rhône-Alpes (1:296)
6. Brittany (1:333)
7. Pays de la Loire (1:336)
8. Provence-Alpes-Côte d'Azur (1:348)
9. Hauts-de-France (1:391)

== List of people with the name ==
The following people and items share the name Bernard:

=== Given name ===
==== Catholic saints ====
- Saint Bernard

==== Medieval ====
- Bernard, son of Charles Martel (c. 720 – 787), Abbot of St. Quentin
- Bernard (bishop of Carlisle) (died 1214), 13th-century Catholic bishop
- Bernard (bishop of Gaeta) (died 1047)
- Bernard (bishop of St Davids) (1115–1148)
- Bernard (son of Charles the Fat) (died 891 or 892), Duke of Alemannia
- Bernard Gui (c. 1260 – 1331), 14th century inquisitor
- Bernard of Calvo (Bernat Calbó), 13th-century saint and Bishop of Vich
- Bernard of Carinola (died 1109), 12th-century saint and Bishop of Carinola
- Bernard of Cluny, 12th-century Benedictine monk
- Bernard of Kilwinning (died c. 1331), Scottish abbot and chancellor
- Bernard of Quintavalle (died 1241), companion of St. Francis of Assisi
- Bernard of Verdun, author of the Tractatus super totam astrologiam

==== Modern ====
- Bernard (footballer) (Bernard Anício Caldeira Duarte), Brazilian footballer
- Bernard Aluwihare (1902–1961), Sri Lankan politician
- Bernard Alvarez, NASCAR racing driver
- Bernard Anício Caldeira Duarte, known as "Bernard", Brazilian footballer
- Bernard Balleret (born 1954), Monegasque tennis player
- Bernard Baruch (1870–1965), American financier and political adviser
- Bernard Berrian (born 1980), American football player
- Bernard Blandre (born 1948), French sociologist
- Bernard Blaut (1940–2007), Polish football player
- Bernard Bober (born 1950), Slovak Catholic Prelate, Archbishop of Košice
- Bernard Bonnejean (born 1950), French author
- Bernard Boursicot (born 1944), on whom the play M. Butterfly was based
- Bernard Bresslaw (1934–1993), British actor, Carry On films
- Bernard Brown (actor) (born 1933), British actor
- Bernard B. Brown (1898–1981), American sound engineer
- Bernard Butler (born 1970), English musician
- Bernard Caprasse (born 1949), Belgian politician
- Bernard Cerquiglini (born 1947), French linguist
- Bernard Charvin (born 1947), French alpine skier
- Bernard Chenez (born 1946), French cartoonist and writer
- Bernard Cottret (1951–2020), French historian
- Bernard Coyne (giant) (1897–1921), American who is one of only 20 individuals in medical history to have stood 8 feet (240 cm) or more
- Bernard Cribbins (1928–2022), English children's TV personality, actor and voice artist
- Bernard Dowiyogo (1946–2003), President of Nauru
- Bernard Ebbers (1941–2020), engineered an accounting fraud at WorldCom while he was its CEO
- Bernie Ecclestone (born 1930), British business magnate and primary authority in Formula One
- Bernard Edwards (American football) (born 1969), American football player
- Bernard Fanning (born 1969), Australian singer, Powderfinger
- Bernard Fensterwald, American lawyer
- Bernard Finnigan (born 1972), Australian politician and sex offender
- Bernard T. Feld (1919–1993), 20th century physicist and anti-nuclear activist
- Bernard Fox (Irish republican) (born 1951), Provisional Irish Republican Army member
- Bernard Freeman, birth name of American rapper Bun B
- Bernard Freyberg, 1st Baron Freyberg, New Zealand's most famous soldier and General of World War II
- Bernard Grech, Maltese politician serving as the leader of the Nationalist Party and Opposition
- Bernard Guignedoux (1947–2021), French football player
- Bernard Haisch (1949–2026), German-born American astrophysicist
- Bernard Hall (disambiguation), multiple people
- Bernard Henry (born 1960), American football player
- Bernard Herrmann (1911–1975), American film composer
- Bernard Hill (1944–2024), English actor
- Bernard Hinault (born 1954), French cyclist, five-time winner of the Tour de France
- Bernard Hopkins (born 1965), boxer
- Bernard Jayamanna (1908–1965), Sri Lankan Sinhala playwright, director, producer, actor
- Bernard Jayasuriya, Sri Lankan businessman and politician
- Bernard Kalb (1922–2023), American broadcast journalist
- Bernard Kester (1928–2018), American artist, designer
- Bernard Koura (1923–2018), French painter
- Bernard Ładysz (1922–2020), Polish singer and actor
- Bernard Lagat (born 1974), Kenyan-American distance runner
- Bernard Lee (1908–1981), English actor
- Bernard Lepkofker, American competitive judoka
- Bernard Looney (born 1969/1970), Irish businessman, CEO of BP
- Bernie Mac (born Bernard McCullough, 1957–2008), comedian and actor
- Bernard Madoff (1938–2021), American stockbroker who engineered a $65 billion Ponzi scheme
- Bernard Malamud (1914–1986), American writer
- Bernard Manning (1930–2007), British stand-up comedian
- Bernard Matthews, English turkey farmer, founder of Bernard Matthews Limited
- Bernard McGinley, American judge
- Bernard Ménétrel (1906–1947), French physician and advisor to Marshal Philippe Pétain during World War II
- Bernard Mohlalisi (1933–2020), Mosotho Roman Catholic bishop
- Bernard Montgomery (1887–1976), English military officer
- Bernard de Montréal (1939–2003), Canadian author and lecturer
- Bernard Moullier (born 1957), French ski jumper
- Bernard of Offida (1604–1694), Italian Roman Catholic professed religious from the Order of Friars Minor Capuchin
- Bernard Opper (1915–2000), American basketball player
- Bernard Orcel (born 1945), French alpine skier
- Bernard Parrish (1919–1999), American politician
- Bernard Peiris (1908–1977), Sri Lankan lawyer
- Bernard Perera (1956–2012), Sri Lankan cricketer
- Bernard Rajzman (born 1957), Brazilian volleyball player
- Bernard Rands (1934–2026), British and American classical composer
- Bernard Ringeissen (1934–2025), French classical pianist
- Bernard H. "Johnny" Rogers (1905–1977), American politician
- Bernard Sachs (1858–1944), American neurologist
- Bernie Sanders (born 1941), US Senator from Vermont
- Bernard Satenstein (1906–1959), American football player
- Bernard Schuiteman (born 1973), Dutch football player
- George Bernard Shaw (1856–1950), usually referred to as "Bernard Shaw", Irish playwright, critic, and essayist
- Bernard Shaw (1940–2022), American broadcast journalist
- Bernard Shir-Cliff (1924–2017), American editor
- Bernard Smith, multiple people
- Bernard Soysa (1914–1997), Sri Lankan Trotskyist
- Bernard Spilsbury (1877–1947), English pathologist
- Bernard Stoeser (1930–2024), American politician
- Bernard Sumner (born 1956), British musician
- Bernard Tapie (1943–2021), French businessman and politician
- Bernie Taupin (born 1950), British songwriter and collaborator with Elton John
- Bernard Tilakaratna (1927–2004), Sri Lankan diplomat
- Bernard Tomic (born 1992), Australian tennis player
- Bernard Vera (born 1950), French politician
- Bernard Vogler (1935–2020), French historian and academic
- Bernard Whitman (fl. 1980s–2020s), Democratic strategist and pollster
- Bernard Wilson, multiple people
- Bernard "Bernie" Wolfe (born 1951), Canadian hockey player
- Bernard Wolfman (1924–2011), American dean of the University of Pennsylvania Law School, and law professor
- Bernard Zehrfuss (1911–1996), French architect
- Bernard Welsh (1959)

=== Surname ===
- Bernard (surname)

=== Fictional characters ===
==== Given name ====
- Bernard (TV shorts), the curious polar bear from the animation series Bernard
- Bernard, a character in The Rescuers
- Bernard, a character from Blackadder II, who is usually only called by her title: Nursie
- Bernarda Alba, the mother in Federico García Lorca's drama, La casa de Bernarda Alba
- Bernard Beasley, a character from the children's programme Bernard's Watch
- Bernard Bernoulli, a character from Maniac Mansion
- Bernard Black, a character from Black Books
- Bernard "Barney" Fife, deputy sheriff of Mayberry from The Andy Griffith Show
- Bernard Nadler, a character from the television show Lost
- Bernard Quatermass, a British scientist in the Quatermass science fiction productions
- Bernard the Arch-elf, The Head elf from Disney's Santa Clause Movies
- Bernard Wiseman, a character from Mobile Suit Gundam 0080: War in the Pocket
- Bernard Woolley, a character from Yes Minister

==== Surname ====
- Andy Bernard, character on the United States television series The Office

== See also ==
- Barnard (disambiguation)
- Barney (disambiguation)
- Bernat (disambiguation)
- Bernhard (disambiguation)
- Grand Rivers, Kentucky, United States, formerly known as Bernard
- Saint Bernard (disambiguation)
