= Bernadetta =

- Gender: feminine

Origin
- Origin: French, West Germanic
- Region of origin: medieval Europe

Other names
- Related names: Bernie, Barnard, Bernardas, Bearnárd, Bernardo, Beñat, Bernhard, Bernhardt, Bernd, Bernadette, Berend

Bernadetta is a female French and Polish variation of the name Bernard, which means "brave as a bear". Notable persons with that name include:

== People ==
- Bernadetta Blechacz (born 1955), Polish javelin thrower
- Bernadeta Bocek-Piotrowska (born 1970), Polish cross country skier
- Bernadetta Matuszczak (1931–2021), Polish composer

== Fictional characters ==
- Bernadetta von Varley, a shy noble lady and playable character in Fire Emblem: Three Houses and Fire Emblem Warriors: Three Hopes

== See also ==
- Bernadotte (disambiguation)
- Bernadette (disambiguation)
