= Bernadotte =

Bernadotte may refer to:

- House of Bernadotte, the royal family of Sweden
  - Jean Baptiste Jules Bernadotte French Jacobin leader, later French Marshal, later King Charles XIV of Sweden and founder of the House of Bernadotte

== People ==
- Estelle Bernadotte (1904–1984), wife of Folke
- Folke Bernadotte (1895–1948), Swedish statesman
- Bernadotte Perrin (1847–1920), American classicist
- Bernadotte Everly Schmitt (1886–1969), American historian

== Places in the United States ==
- Bernadotte, Minnesota
- Bernadotte Township, Fulton County, Illinois
- Bernadotte Township, Nicollet County, Minnesota
- Bernadotte Bridge, a historical bridge in Illinois

== See also ==
- Bernadette (disambiguation)
- Bernadetta (disambiguation)
- Bernadotte plan, (1948) for mediation between the Arabs and Israel, proposed by Folke Bernadotte
