= List of estimates of the 1948 Palestinian expulsion and flight =

This article lists the various interim and final United Nations estimates for the number of Palestinian people who fled or were expelled from their homes during the 1948 Palestine war. It also provides other interim and final estimates for the number of Palestinian refugees for that period.

== UN estimates ==
=== Estimate of number of people who left or fled the area captured by Israel ===
- 726,000 according to the Final Report of the United Nations Economic Survey Mission for the Middle East published by the United Nations Conciliation Commission, December 28, 1949. (Note: This estimate by the UN Conciliation Commission has been repeated in a number of other UN documents. The number was calculated by estimating the number of non-Jews living within the borders of Israel at the end of 1947 and subtracting the number of remaining non-Jews living within the borders of Israel after the war. It does not include an estimated 25,000 border-line refugees – refugees who lost their livelihood because their village land was located in Israeli-occupied territory, while the village house remained in Arab territory. The figure was later revised down by the UN Conciliation Commission to 711,000.)
- 711,000 according to the General Progress Report and Supplementary Report of the United Nations Conciliation Commission for Palestine, Covering the Period from 11 December 1949 to 23 October 1950, published by the United Nations Conciliation Commission, October 23, 1950. (Note: The Committee believed the estimate to be "as accurate as circumstances permit", and attributed the higher number on relief to, among other things, "duplication of ration cards, addition of persons who have been displaced from area other than Israel-held areas and of persons who, although not displaced, are destitute.")

=== Estimates of total number of people who registered as refugees ===
- 800,000 – 900,000 according to the Historical Survey of Efforts of the United Nations Conciliation Commission for Palestine to Secure the Implementation of Paragraph 11 of General Assembly Resolution 194 (III) published by the United Nations Conciliation Commission, October 2, 1961.
- 875,998 refugees in June 1951, according to the Report of the Director of the United Nations Relief and Works Agency for Palestine Refugees in the Near East published by the United Nations Relief and Works Agency, September 28, 1951. (Note: Figure inflated because "all births are eagerly announced, the deaths wherever possible are passed over in silence, and as the birthrate is high in any case, a net addition of 30,000 names a year". The figure includes descendants of the Palestinian refugees born after the Palestinian exodus up to June 1951.)
- 914,000 refugees in 1950, according to the United Nations Relief and Works Agency website. (Note: Figure does not match official UNRWA estimates submitted to the UN.)
- 957,000 refugees in 1950 according to the Report of the Director of the United Nations Relief and Works Agency for Palestine Refugees in the Near East published by the United Nations Relief and Works Agency, September 28, 1951. (Note: Figure later revised down to 876,000 by UNRWA after "many false and duplicate registrations weeded out.")

== Other estimates of flight or refugees ==
- 550,000 − 600,000 According to an Israeli government estimate (according to Efraim Karsh)
- 539,000 According to Walter Pinner
- 583,000 – 609,000 According to Efraim Karsh
- 600,000 According to Joseph B. Schechtman
- 630,000 According to Yoram Ettinger
- 700,000± According to Benny Morris in his book "The Birth of the Palestinian Refugee Problem Revisited"
- 750,000 According to Ilan Pappé
- 800,000± According to Baha Abushaqra
- 800,000 – Walter Eytan, in a private letter of 1950 referred to the UNRWA registration in 1949 as "meticulous", but thought that "the real number was close to 800,000".
- 804,767 According to Salman Abu-Sitta (Note: Figure calculated by using the official village statistics of 1944/1945 and upgraded to 1948/1949 by taking a net natural increase of 3.8% for four years. The number of non-Jews remaining in Israel was then deducted from the total count.)
- 900,000 According to Abdel-Azim Hammad
- 935,000 According to Salman Abu-Sitta
- almost 1 000,000 According to the 3rd edition of the Great Soviet Encyclopedia (author of the article — Galina Stepanovna Nikitina).

== Interim estimates ==
Interim estimates from UN sources:

- Sir Raphael Cilento, director of the UN Disaster Relief Project (DRP): 300,000 − 350,000 in August
- 360,000 in September, 1948, according to the Progress Report of the United Nations Mediator on Palestine published by UN Mediator Count Folke Bernadotte, September 16, 1948. (Note: Figure refers only to people registered as refugees.)
- 472,000 in October, 1948, according to the Progress Report of the Acting United Nations Mediator on Palestine published by Acting UN Mediator Ralph Bunche, October 18, 1948. (Note: Figure refers only to people registered as refugees.)

From other sources:

- 200,000+ by May, 1948 according to Samuel Katz (in 1973)
- 300,000± by May, 1948 according to Noam Chomsky (in 2002)
- 380,000± by 15 May 1948 according to Ilan Pappe (in 1994)
- 335,000 by 5 June 1948 according to Yossef Weitz of the Jewish National Fund.
- 391,000 by 1 June 1948 according to a report by the Haganah's intelligence service (239,000 from the UN-ascribed Jewish state.)
- 200,000 by the mid-June 1948 according to Emil Ghoury.
- 300,000± by late July according to W. De St. Aubin, delegate of the League of Red Cross Societies to the Middle East.
- 631,967 by October "the Arab League estimate" according to Efraim Karsh.
- 460,000 by late October, according to an Israeli study led by Y. Weitz and E. Danin & Z. Lifshitz.

== See also ==
- 1948 Palestinian expulsion and flight
- 1948 Palestinian exodus articles
- Palestinian refugee articles
