= Bernardo =

Bernardo is a given name, possibly derived from the Germanic Bernhard. It may refer to:

== People ==
- Bernardo the Japanese (died 1557), early Japanese Christian convert and disciple of Saint Francis Xavier
- Bernardo Accolti (1465–1536), Italian poet
- Bernardo Bellotto (c. 1721/2-1780), Venetian urban landscape painter and printmaker in etching
- Bernardo Bernardo (1941–2018), Filipino veteran stage actor, comedian, and film director
- Bernardo Bertolucci (1941–2018), Italian film director and screenwriter
- Bernardo Buontalenti (c. 1531 – 1608), Italian stage designer, architect, theatrical designer, military engineer and artist
- Bernardo de Sousa Campos, Brazilian politician and lawyer
- Bernardo Clesio (1484–1539), Italian cardinal, bishop, prince, diplomat, humanist and botanist
- Bernardo Corradi (born 1976), Italian footballer
- Bernardo Daddi (c. 1280 – 1348), Italian Renaissance painter
- Bernardo Domínguez (born 1979), Spanish footballer known as Bernardo
- Bernardo Dovizi (1470–1520), Italian cardinal and comedy writer
- Bernardo Espinosa (born 1989), Colombian footballer
- Bernardo Frizoni (born 1990), Brazilian footballer
- Bernardo Fernandes da Silva (born 1965), Brazilian footballer
- Bernardo Fernandes da Silva Junior (born 1995), Brazilian footballer and son of the previous Bernardo
- Bernardo de Gálvez (1746–1786), Spanish military leader and colonial administrator who aided the United States in the American Revolutionary War
- Bernardo Gandulla, Argentine footballer
- Bernardo Guimarães (1825–1884), Brazilian poet and novelist
- Bernardo Houssay (1887–1971), Argentine physiologist and Nobel Prize laureate
- Bernardo Kuczer, Argentinian composer, music theoretician and architect
- Bernardo Leighton (1909–1995), Chilean politician
- Bernardo di Niccolò Machiavelli (between 1426 and 1429–1500), Doctor of Law and father of Niccolò Machiavelli
- Bernardo Mattarella (1905–1971), Italian politician
- Bernardo de Miera y Pacheco (1713–1785), cartographer and artist in New Spain
- Bernardo Mota (born 1971), Portuguese tennis player
- Bernardo O'Higgins (1778–1842), Chilean independence leader, one of the founders and ruler of Chile
- Bernardo Pasquini (1637–1710), Italian composer and virtuoso keyboard player
- Bernardo Paias Ferreira (born 2005), Brazilian footballer
- Bernardo Peres da Silva (1775–1844), only native governor of Portuguese India
- Bernardo Putairi (died 1889), last native ruler of Mangareva
- Bernardo Provenzano (1933–2016), leader of the Sicilian Mafia
- Bernardo Reyes (1850–1913), Mexican general and state governor
- Bernardo Rezende (born 1959), Brazilian volleyball coach and player
- Bernardo Romeo (born 1977), Argentine footballer
- Bernardo Rossellino (1409–1464), Italian sculptor and architect
- Bernardo Rucellai (1448/49-1514), Italian oligarch, banker, ambassador and man of letters
- Bernardo Samper, Colombian squash player
- Bernardo Saraiva (born 1993), Portuguese tennis player
- Bernardo Segura (born 1970), Mexican race walker
- Bernardo Saracino, American actor
- Bernardo Silva (born 1994), Portuguese footballer
- Bernardo Strozzi (c. 1581 – 1644), Italian painter
- Bernardo Tichz Toffolo (born 2005), Brazilian footballer
- Bernardo Tolomei (1272–1348), Italian saint, theologian and founder of the Roman Catholic Congregation of the Blessed Virgin of Monte Oliveto
- Bernardo Trujillo (1920–1971), Colombian-born American marketing executive
- Bernardo Vieira de Souza (born 1990), Brazilian footballer better known as Bernardo
- Bernardo Yorba (1800–1858), American rancher

== Fictional characters ==
- Bernardo, from William Shakespeare's play Hamlet
- Bernardo, Zorro's deaf-mute servant
- Bernardo, the leader of the Sharks in West Side Story
- Bernardo O'Reilly in The Magnificent Seven
- Bernardo de la Paz in The Moon is a Harsh Mistress, a Robert Heinlein novel

=== Mythical people ===
- Bernardo del Carpio, a mythical Spanish medieval hero

== See also ==
- Bernard, a given name
- Bernardo (surname)
