= Bernhard =

Bernhard is a given name. Notable people with the name include:

- Bernhard of Saxe-Weimar (1604–1639), Duke of Saxe-Weimar
- Bernhard, Prince of Saxe-Meiningen (1901–1984), head of the House of Saxe-Meiningen 1946–1984
- Bernhard, Count of Bylandt (1905–1998), German nobleman, artist, and author
- Prince Bernhard of Lippe-Biesterfeld (1911–2004), Prince Consort of Queen Juliana of the Netherlands
- Bernhard Markgraf von Baden (born 1970), German prince
- Bernhard Beibl (born 1979), Austrian musician
- Bernhard Brenner (died 2017), German physiologist
- Bernhard Frank (1913–2011), German SS Commander
- Bernhard Garside (born 1962), British diplomat
- Bernhard Goetzke (1884–1964), German actor
- Bernhard Grill (born 1961), one of the developers of MP3 technology
- Bernhard Hantzsch (1875–1911), German ornithologist, Arctic researcher, and writer
- Bernhard Heiliger (1915–1995), German sculptor
- Bernhard Höfler (born 1986), Austrian politician
- Bernhard Langer (born 1957), German golfer
- Bernhard Maier (born 1963), German celticist
- Bernhard Raimann (born 1997), Austrian American football player
- Bernhard Riemann (1826–1866), German mathematician
- Bernhard Seidenath (born 1968), German politician
- Bernhard Siebken (1910–1949), German Nazi SS commander, executed for war crimes
- Bernhard van Treeck (born 1964), German psychiatrist
- Bernhard Vogel (1932–2025), German politician
- Bernhard Zintl (born 1965), German pole vaulter
- Prince Bernhard von Bülow (1849–1929) Prince, Prime Minister of Prussia and Chancellor of the German Empire

== See also ==
- Bernard
- Bernhardt
- Saint Bernard (disambiguation)
- Bernhardi (disambiguation)
- Bernd
