= Bernard Smith =

Bernard Smith may refer to:

== Politicians ==
- Bernard Smith (MP) (1522–1591), MP for Totnes
- Bernard Smith (New Jersey politician) (1776–1835), U.S. congressman from New Jersey
- Bernard C. Smith (1923–1993), New York politician

== Sportsmen ==
- Bernard Smith (footballer) (1908–?), English footballer for Birmingham and Coventry
- Bernie Smith (1927–1985), Australian rules footballer
- Bernie Smith (baseball) (1941–2025), American baseball player
- Bernie Smith (darts player) (born 1964), New Zealand darts player
- Bernard Babington Smith (1905–1993), English pole vaulter
- Bernard Smith (runner) (born 1914), winner of the marathon at the 1941 USA Outdoor Track and Field Championships

== Others ==
- Bernard Smith (abbot) (1812–1892), Irish Benedictine monk
- Bernard Smith (art historian) (1916–2011), Australian art historian
- Bernard Smith (editor) (1907–1999), American editor, critic and film producer
- Bernard Smith (geologist) (1881–1936), British geologist
- Bernard Smith (organ builder) (c. 1630 – 1708), English organ builder
- Bernard Smith (sailboat designer) (1910–2010), American high-speed sailboat designer
- Bernard John Smith (1951–2012), English geomorphologist and physical geographer
