= Bernardo (disambiguation) =

Bernardo is a given name.

Bernardo may also refer to:

== People ==
- Bernardo (surname)
- Bernardo (footballer, born 1965), Brazilian football midfielder Bernardo Fernandes da Silva
- Bernardo (footballer, born 1990), Brazilian football midfielder Bernardo Vieira de Souza
- Bernardo (footballer, born 1995), Brazilian football full-back Bernardo Fernandes da Silva Junior

== Places ==
- Bernardo, New Mexico, an unincorporated community
- Bernardo, Texas, an unincorporated area
- Bernardo Glacier, Chile

== See also ==
- San Bernardo (disambiguation)
- São Bernardo (disambiguation)
- Bernardi
- Bernardino (disambiguation)
