= Jose de Sousa Campos =

Brazilian politician

José de Sousa Campos

Personal details
- Born: 1797
- Died: 1858 (aged 60–61)

José de Sousa Campos (1797 – 1858) was a Brazilian politician involved in the history and politics of São Paulo and Campinas. He was a councilman for the town of São Carlos in 1822 and legal counsel for the Council taking part in the success of Independence; councilman in 1837-40 and 1841–44. He was one of the founders of Sousas (also known as Souzas district) and one of the major promoters of the coffee culture. He was the great-grandson of Barreto Leme and Sousa Siqueira, founders of Campinas.

== See also ==
- Bernardo de Sousa Campos
