= Bernardo (footballer, born March 2005) =

Brazilian footballer

Personal information
- Full name: Bernardo Tichz Toffolo
- Date of birth: 11 March 2005 (age 21)
- Place of birth: São Domingos do Sul, Brazil
- Height: 1.87 m (6 ft 2 in)
- Position: Centre-back

Team information
- Current team: Juventude
- Number: 43

Youth career
- 2018–2025: Juventude

Senior career*
Years	Team	Apps	(Gls)
2025–	Juventude	1	(0)
- * Club domestic league appearances and goals as of 16:45, 11 December 2025 (UTC)

Bernardo Tichz Toffolo (born 11 March 2005), simply known as Bernardo, is a Brazilian footballer who plays as a centre-back for Juventude.

== Career ==
Born in São Domingos do Sul, Rio Grande do Sul, Bernardo joined Juventude's youth sides in 2018, aged 13. In 2022, after impressing with the under-17s, he played in the Viareggio Cup for Carrarese.

On 22 August 2025, after being a regular starter for the under-20s, Bernardo renewed his contract with Ju until December 2027. He made his first team – and Série A – debut on 7 December, starting in a 1–1 away draw against Corinthians, as the club was already relegated.

== Career statistics ==
As of 11 December 2025

Club	Season	League			State League		Cup		Continental		Other		Total	
Club	Season	Division	Apps	Goals	Apps	Goals	Apps	Goals	Apps	Goals	Apps	Goals	Apps	Goals
Juventude	2024	Série A	0	0	0	0	0	0	—		4 (Note: Appearance(s) in Copa FGF)	0	4	0
Juventude	2025	Série A	1	0	0	0	0	0	—		4	1	5	1
Career total			1	0	0	0	0	0	0	0	8	1	9	1
