= Bernhardt =

Bernhardt is both a given name and a surname. Notable people with the name include:

Given name:

- Bernhardt Esau (born 1957), Namibian politician and Deputy Ministry of Trade and Industry
- Bernhardt Holtermann (1838–1885), gold miner, businessman, and politician in Australia
- Bernhardt Jungmann (1671–1747), German botanist

Surname:

- Bernhardt (surname)

== See also ==
- Bernhardt Creek, a stream in Oregon
- Bernhardt Line, German World War II defensive line in Italy
- Bernhard
