= Palestinian refugees =

Displaced persons and refugees

Clickable map of the more than 400 depopulated towns and villages of the 1948 Palestinian exodus (red) and the c. 60 modern day Palestinian refugee camps (blue)

In 1949, UNRWA formally defined the term "Palestine refugee" to refer to any Palestinian citizen or the descendant of any male Palestinian citizen who—if their regular place of residence was located within Mandatory Palestine between 1 June 1946 and 15 May 1948—was found to have "lost both home and means of livelihood" during the 1948 Palestine war. While this definition originally included Arab Palestinians displaced from or within Israel as well as Jewish Palestinians displaced from Arab-controlled territory, it ceased to apply to Arabs and Jews who became Israeli citizens in 1952; Arab Palestinians who were displaced from their homes while ultimately remaining within Israeli territory were instead designated as "present absentees" and not subject to UNRWA's jurisdiction. In addition to more than 700,000 Palestinians (Note: The exact number of refugees is disputed. See List of estimates of the Palestinian Refugee flight of 1948 for details.) who fled or were expelled by Israel before the 1949 Armistice Agreements, another 285,000 to 325,000 Palestinians were displaced due to the 1967 Arab–Israeli War.

As of 2019, more than 5.6 million Palestinians were registered with UNRWA as refugees, of whom more than 1.5 million were living in UNRWA-run camps; UNRWA's assistance is limited to Palestinian refugees and their descendants living in the occupied Palestinian territories (West Bank and Gaza Strip), Lebanon, Jordan, and Syria. According to some estimates, as many as 1,050,000 to 1,380,000 people who are descendants of the displaced citizens of Mandatory Palestine are not registered under UNRWA or UNHCR mandates.

Palestinian refugees are the modern world's oldest unsettled refugee population, having been under the ongoing governance of various Arab countries following the 1948 Arab–Israeli War, the refugee populations of the West Bank under Israeli governance since 1967 and Palestinian Authority administration since the 1995 Oslo II Accord, and the Gaza Strip administered by Hamas since 2007.

Today, the largest number of refugees, over 2,000,000, live in Jordan, where by 2009 over 90% of UNWRA-registered Palestinian refugees had acquired full citizenship rights. This figure consists almost exclusively of West Bank–descended Palestinians; (Note: The West Bank was formerly administered by Jordan, who gave citizenship to its residents.) however, as of December 2021, Palestinians with roots in the Gaza Strip are also still kept in legal limbo. In 2021, Jordanian politician Jawad Anani estimated that roughly 50% of Jordan's population had West Bank–Palestinian roots. (Note: Anani called this a "crude estimate", as the Jordanian government has not made direct statistics on this matter.) Another approximately 2,000,000 refugees live in the West Bank and Gaza Strip, under Israeli occupation and blockade. Approximately 500,000 refugees live in each of Syria and Lebanon respectively, albeit under very different circumstances. While Palestinian refugees in Syria maintained their stateless status, the Syrian government during Assad's rule afforded them the same economic and social rights enjoyed by Syrian citizens; they were also drafted into the Armed Forces despite not being citizens. Citizenship or legal residency in some host countries is denied, most notably for the Palestinian refugees in Lebanon, where the absorption of Palestinians would upset a delicate confessional balance. For the refugees themselves, these situations mean they have reduced rights: no right to vote, limited property rights and access to social services, among other things.

On 11 December 1948, the General Assembly of the United Nations (UNGA) adopted Resolution 194 which is understood by some parties to establish a UN position of Palestinian right to return, but this interpretation is contested.

== Definitions ==
=== UNRWA ===
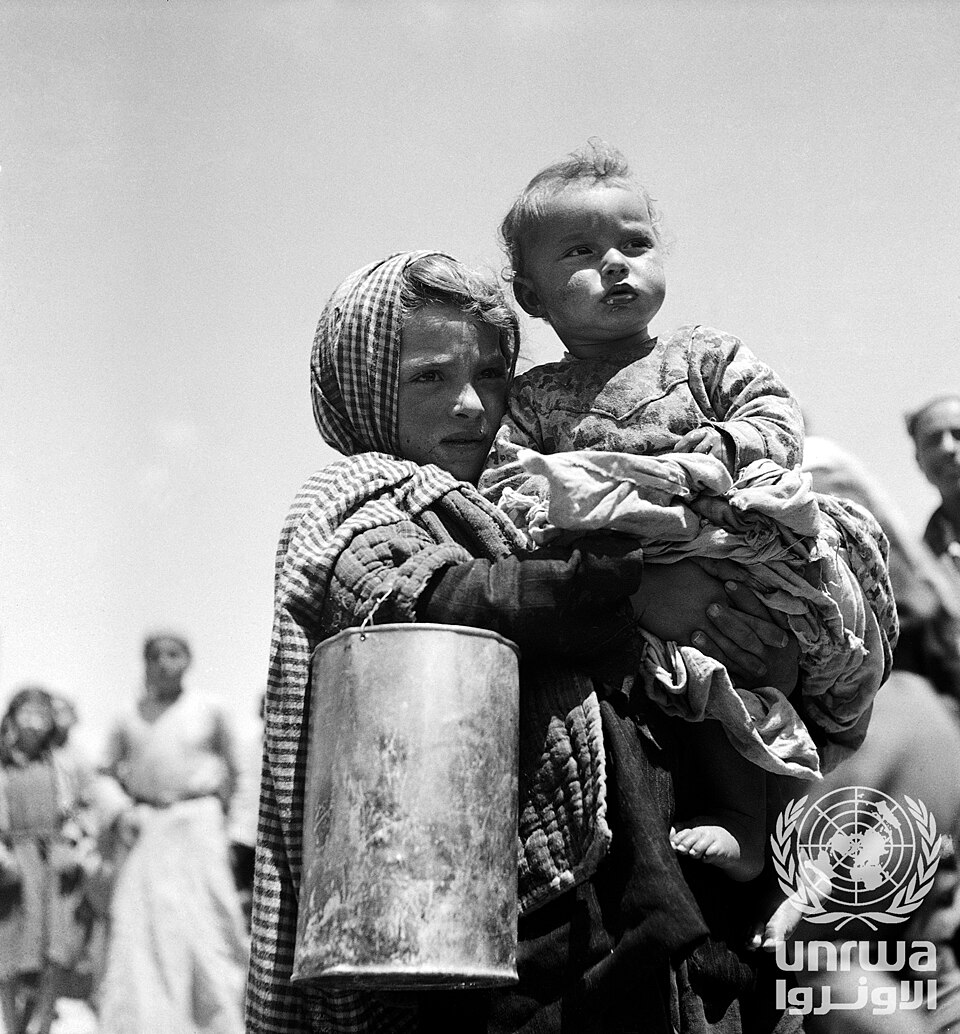
A Palestine refugee girl and her baby brother wait shyly for their daily ration of food and milk from the United Nations International Children's Emergency Fund (UNICEF), 1948

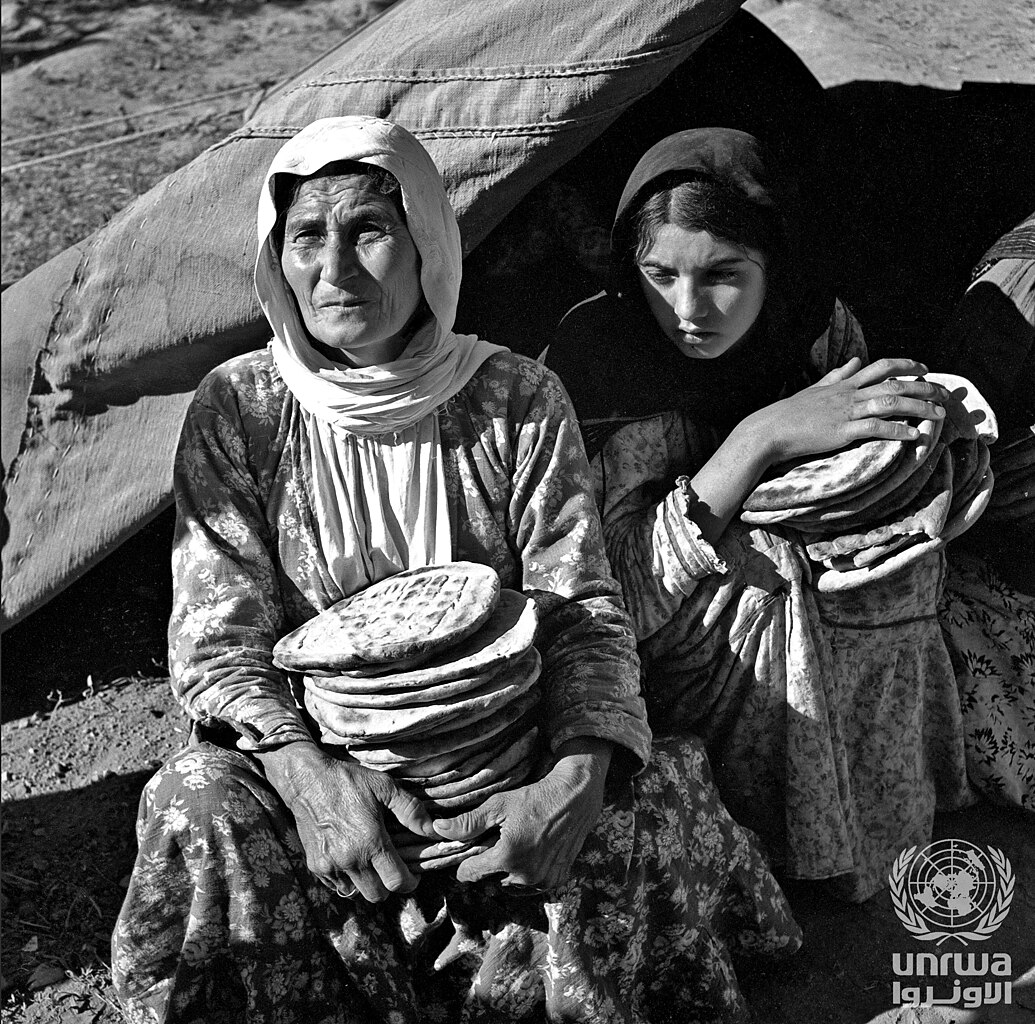
Palestine refugee women receiving their meal of bread from United Nations Relief for Palestine Refugees (UNRPR), 1948

The United Nations Relief and Works Agency (UNRWA) is an organ of the United Nations established in 1949 for the purpose of aiding those displaced by the Arab–Israeli conflict. It defines a "Palestine refugee" as a person "whose normal place of residence was Mandatory Palestine between June 1946 and May 1948, who lost both their homes and means of livelihood as a result of the 1948 Arab–Israeli conflict". The Six-Day War of 1967 generated a new wave of Palestinian refugees who could not be included in the original UNRWA definition. From 1991, the UN General Assembly has adopted an annual resolution allowing the 1967 refugees within the UNRWA mandate. UNRWA aids all "those living in its area of operations who meet its working definition, who are registered with the Agency and who need assistance" and those who first became refugees as a result of the Six-Day War, regardless whether they reside in areas designated as Palestine refugee camps or in other permanent communities.

A Palestine refugee camp is "a plot of land placed at the disposal of UNRWA by the host government to accommodate Palestine refugees and to set up facilities to cater to their needs". About 1.4 million of registered Palestine refugees, approximately one-third, live in the 58 UNRWA-recognised refugee camps in Jordan, Lebanon, Syria, the Gaza Strip and the West Bank. The UNRWA definition does not cover final status. UNRWA's annual budget is approximately $600 million.

Registered descendants of UNRWA Palestine refugees, like "Nansen passport" and "Certificate of Eligibility" holders (the documents issued to those displaced by World War II) or like UNHCR refugees, inherit the same Palestine refugee status as their male parent. According to UNRWA, "The descendants of Palestine refugee males, including adopted children, are also eligible for registration."

The UNHCR had counted 90,000 refugees by 2014.

=== Palestinian definitions ===
Palestinians make several distinctions relating to Palestinian refugees. The 1948 refugees and their descendants are broadly defined as "refugees" (laji'un). The Palestine Liberation Organization (PLO), especially those who have returned and form part of the PNA, but also Palestinian refugee camp residents in Lebanon, repudiate this term, since it implies being a passive victim, and prefer the autonym of 'returnees' (a'idun). Those who left since 1967, and their descendants, are called nazihun or "displaced persons", though many may also descend from the 1948 group.

== Origin of the Palestine refugees ==
Most Palestinian refugees have retained their refugee status and continue to reside in refugee camps, including within the State of Palestine in the West Bank and in the Gaza Strip. Their descendants form a sizable portion of the Palestinian diaspora.

=== Palestinian refugees from the 1948 Palestine War ===
During the 1948 Palestine War, some 700,000 Palestinian Arabs or 85% of the Palestinian Arab population of territories that became Israel fled or were expelled from their homes. Some 30,000 to 50,000 were alive by 2012.

The causes and responsibilities of the exodus are a matter of controversy among historians and commentators of the conflict. While historians agree on most of the events of the period, there remains disagreement as to whether the exodus was the result of a plan designed before or during the war or was an unintended consequence of the war. According to historian Benny Morris, the expulsion was planned and encouraged by the Zionist leadership.

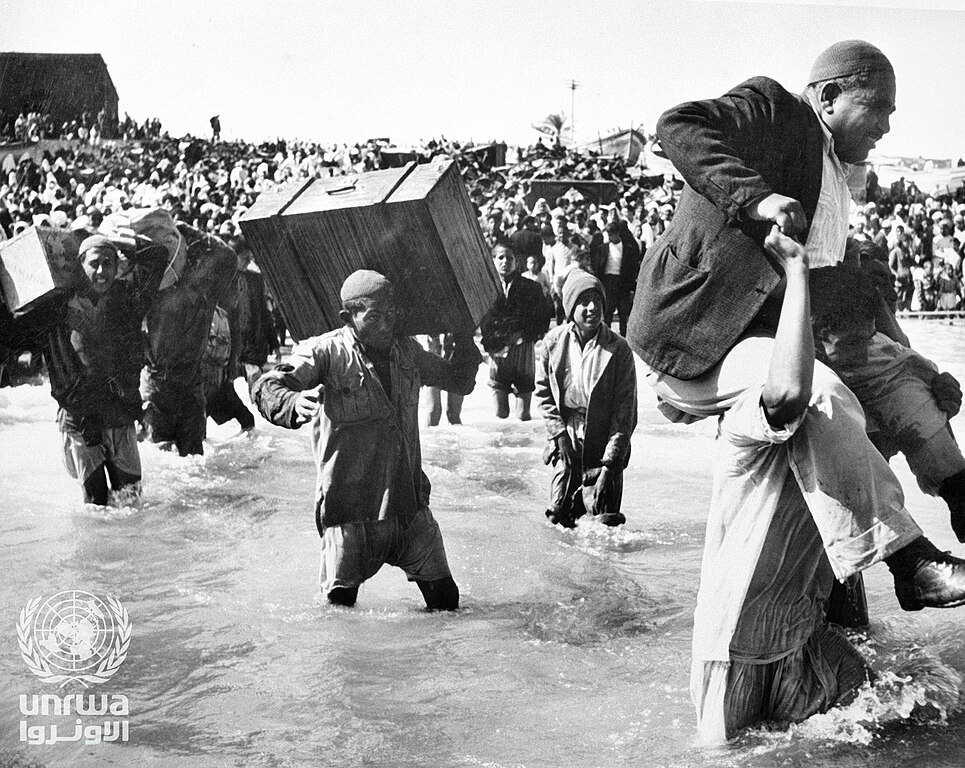
Palestine refugees initially displaced to Beach camp in Gaza board boats to Lebanon or Egypt during the 1948 war

According to Morris, between December 1947 and March 1948, around 100,000 Palestine Arabs fled. Among them were many from the higher and middle classes from the cities, who left voluntarily, expecting to return when the Arab states won the war and took control of the country. When the Haganah and then the emerging Israeli army (Israel Defense Forces or IDF) went on the defensive, between April and July, a further 250,000 to 300,000 Palestinian Arabs left or were expelled, mainly from the towns of Haifa, Tiberias, Beit-Shean, Safed, Jaffa and Acre, which lost more than 90 percent of their Arab inhabitants. Expulsions took place in many towns and villages, particularly along the Tel Aviv–Jerusalem road and in Eastern Galilee. About 50,000–70,000 inhabitants of Lydda and Ramle were expelled towards Ramallah by the IDF during Operation Danny, and most others during operations of the IDF in its rear areas. During Operation Dekel, the Arabs of Nazareth and South Galilee were allowed to remain in their homes. Today they form the core of the Arab Israeli population. From October to November 1948, the IDF launched Operation Yoav to remove Egyptian forces from the Negev and Operation Hiram to remove the Arab Liberation Army from North Galilee during which at least nine events named massacres of Arabs were carried out by IDF soldiers. These events generated an exodus of 200,000 to 220,000 Palestinian Arabs. Here, Arabs fled fearing atrocities or were expelled if they had not fled. After the war, from 1948 to 1950, the IDF resettled around 30,000 to 40,000 Arabs from the borderlands of the new Israeli state.

=== Palestinian refugees from Six-Day War ===
Palestine refugees flee across the Allenby Bridge during the 1967 hostilities

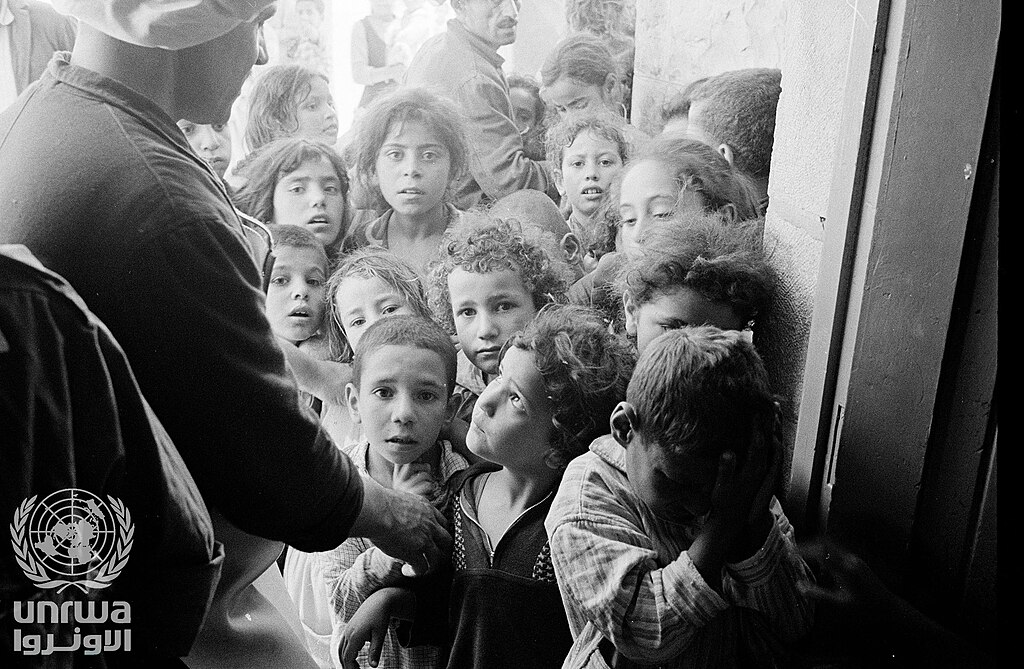
First shelter for thousand of Arab refugees who fled from the West Bank following hostilities in June 1967, was in school and other public buildings

As a result of the Six-Day War, 280,000 to 325,000 Palestinians fled or were expelled from the territories conquered in the Six-Day War by Israel, including the demolished Palestinian villages of Imwas, Yalo, Bayt Nuba, Surit, Beit Awwa, Beit Mirsem, Shuyukh, Jiftlik, Agarith and Huseirat, and the "emptying" of the refugee camps of Aqabat Jabr and Ein as-Sultan.

=== Palestinian exodus from Kuwait (Gulf War) ===
The Palestinian exodus from Kuwait took place during and after the Gulf War. During the Gulf War, more than 200,000 Palestinians voluntarily fled Kuwait during the Iraqi occupation of Kuwait due to harassment and intimidation by Iraqi security forces, in addition to getting fired from work by Iraqi authority figures in Kuwait. After the Gulf War, Kuwaiti authorities forcibly pressured nearly 200,000 Palestinians to leave Kuwait in 1991. Kuwait's policy, which led to this exodus, was a response to alignment of Palestinian leader Yasser Arafat and the Palestine Liberation Organization (PLO) with the dictator Saddam Hussein, who had earlier invaded Kuwait.

Prior to the Gulf War, Palestinians numbered 400,000 out of Kuwait's population of 2.2 million. The Palestinians who fled Kuwait were Jordanian citizens. In 2013, there were 280,000 Jordanian citizens of Palestinian origin in Kuwait. In 2012, 80,000 Palestinians (without Jordanian citizenship) lived in Kuwait. In total, there are 360,000 Palestinians in Kuwait as of 2012–2013.

=== Palestinian refugees as part of the Syrian refugee crisis ===
Many Palestinians in Syria were displaced as a result of the Syrian Civil War starting in 2011. By October 2013, 235,000 Palestinians had been displaced within Syria itself and 60,000 (alongside 2.2 million Syrians) had fled the country. By March 2019, the UHCR estimated that 120,000 Palestine refugees had fled Syria since 2011, primarily to Lebanon and Jordan, but also Turkey and further afield.

There were reports that Jordan and Lebanon had turned away Palestinian refugees attempting to flee the humanitarian crises in Syria. By 2013, Jordan had absorbed 126,000 Syrian refugees but Palestinians fleeing Syria were placed in a separate refugee camp under stricter conditions and banned from entering Jordanian cities.

Palestinian refugees from Syria also sought asylum in Europe, especially Sweden, which had offered asylum to any Syrian refugees that managed to reach its territory, albeit with some conditions. Many did so by finding their way to Egypt and making the journey by sea. In October 2013, the PFLP-GC claimed that some 23,000 Palestinian refugees from the Yarmouk Camp alone had immigrated to Sweden.

=== Palestinian refugees during the 2023 Israel–Gaza war ===
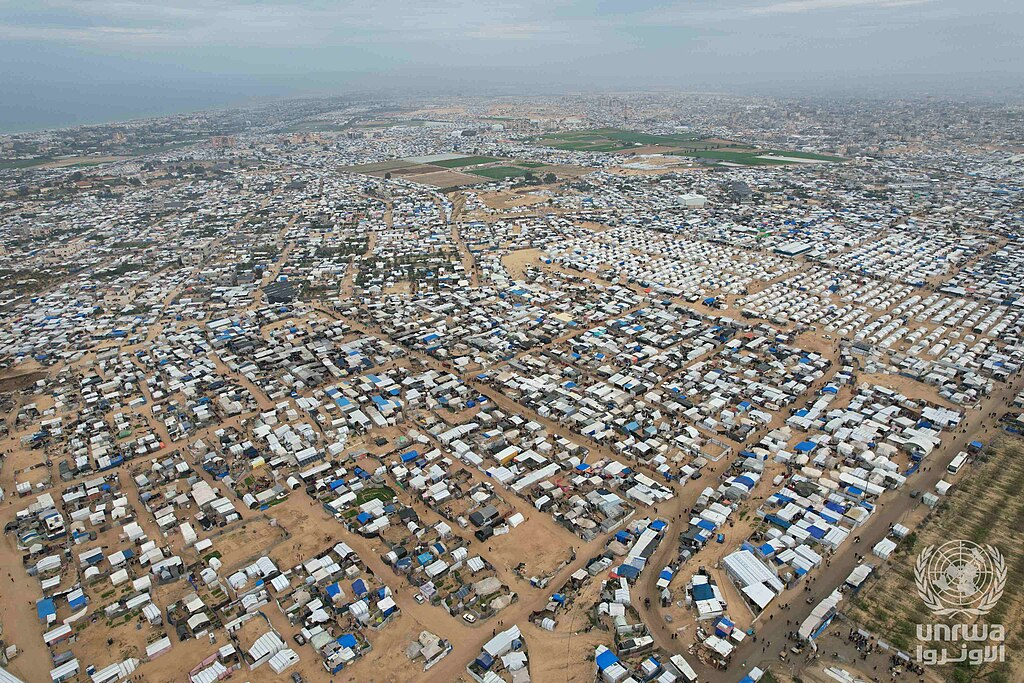
Aerial view of the Al-Mawasi area, where displaced Palestinians live in tents, January 2025

As of January 2024, more than 85% of Palestinians in Gaza, approximately 1.9 million people, were internally displaced during the Gaza war. Some wounded Palestinians from Gaza were allowed to leave for Egypt. As of 2025, there are over 100,000 Gazan refugees living in Egypt.

== Refugee statistics ==
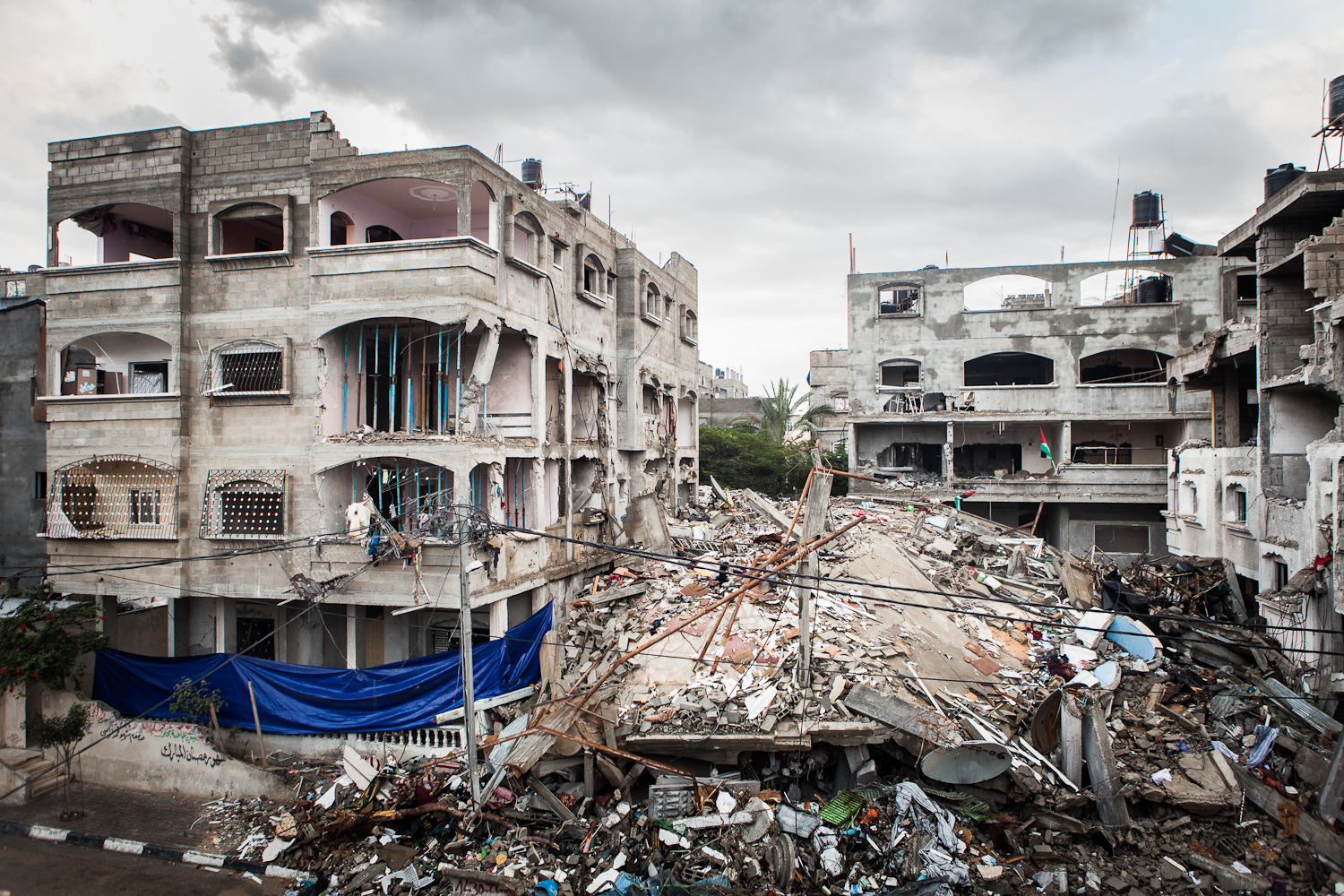
Destroyed house in the Jabalia refugee camp, Gaza–Israel conflict, December 2012

The number of Palestine refugees varies depending on the source. For 1948–49 refugees, for example, the Israeli government suggests a number as low as 520,000 as opposed to 850,000 by their Palestinian counterparts. As of January 2015, UNRWA cites 5,149,742 registered refugees in total, of whom 1,603,018 are registered in camps.

District	Number of depopulated villages	Number of refugees in 1948	Number of refugees in 2000
Beersheba	88	90,507	590,231
Beisan	31	19,602	127,832
Jenin	6	4,005	26,118
Haifa	59	121,196	790,365
Hebron	16	22,991	149,933
Ramle	64	97,405	635,215
Safad	78	52,248	340,729
Tiberias	26	28,872	188,285
Tulkarm	18	11,032	71,944
Acre	30	47,038	306,753
Gaza	46	79,947	521,360
Jerusalem	39	97,950	638,769
Nazareth	5	8,746	57,036
Jaffa	25	123,227	803,610
Total	531	804,766	5,248,185
Demography of Palestine

The number of UNRWA registered Palestine refugees by country or territory in January 2015 were as follows:

Jordan	2,117,361
Gaza Strip	1,276,929
West Bank	774,167
Syria	528,616
Lebanon	452,669
Total	5,149,742

=== Gaza Strip ===
As of January 2015, the Gaza Strip has 8 UNRWA refugee camps with 560,964 Palestinian refugees, and 1,276,929 registered refugees in total, out of a population of 1,816,379.

=== West Bank ===
Palestinian refugees in Aida Refugee Camp, Bethlehem, 1956

As of January 2015, the West Bank has 19 UNRWA refugee camps with 228,560 Palestinian refugees, and 774,167 registered refugees in total, out of a population of 2,345,107.

=== Jordan ===
"More than 2 million registered Palestine refugees live in Jordan. Most Palestine refugees in Jordan, but not all, have full citizenship", following Jordan's annexation and occupation of the West Bank. The percentage of Palestinian refugees living in refugee camps to those who settled outside the camps is the lowest of all UNRWA fields of operations. Palestine refugees are allowed access to public services and healthcare, as a result, refugee camps are becoming more like poor city suburbs than refugee camps. Most Palestine refugees moved out of the camps to other parts of the country and the number of people registered in refugee camps as of January 2015 is 385,418, who live in ten refugee camps. This caused UNRWA to reduce the budget allocated to Palestine refugee camps in Jordan. Former UNRWA chief-attorney James G. Lindsay wrote in 2009: "In Jordan, where 2 million Palestinian refugees live, all but 167,000 have citizenship, and are fully eligible for government services including education and health care." Lindsay suggests that eliminating services to refugees whose needs are subsidized by Jordan "would reduce the refugee list by 40%".

Palestinians who moved from the West Bank (whether refugees or not) to Jordan, are issued yellow-ID cards to distinguish them from the Palestinians of the "official 10 refugee camps" in Jordan. From 1988 to 2012, thousands of those yellow-ID card Palestinians had their Jordanian citizenship revoked. Human Rights Watch estimated that about 2,700 Palestinians were stripped of Jordanian nationality between 2004 and 2008. In 2012, the Jordanian government promised to stop revoking the citizenship of some Palestinians, and restored citizenship to 4,500 Palestinians who had previously lost it.

=== Lebanon ===
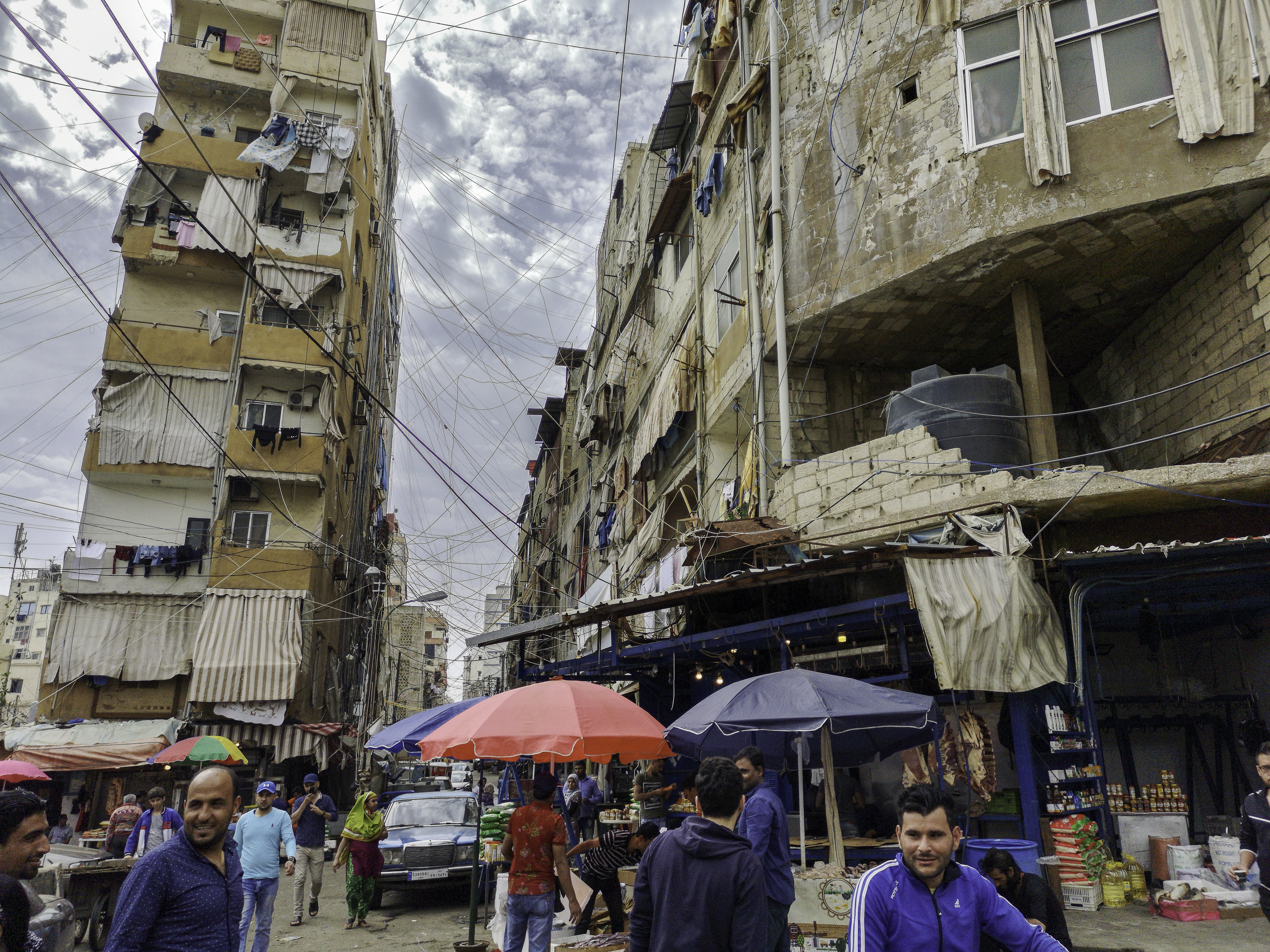
Shatila refugee camp on the outskirts of Beirut in May 2019

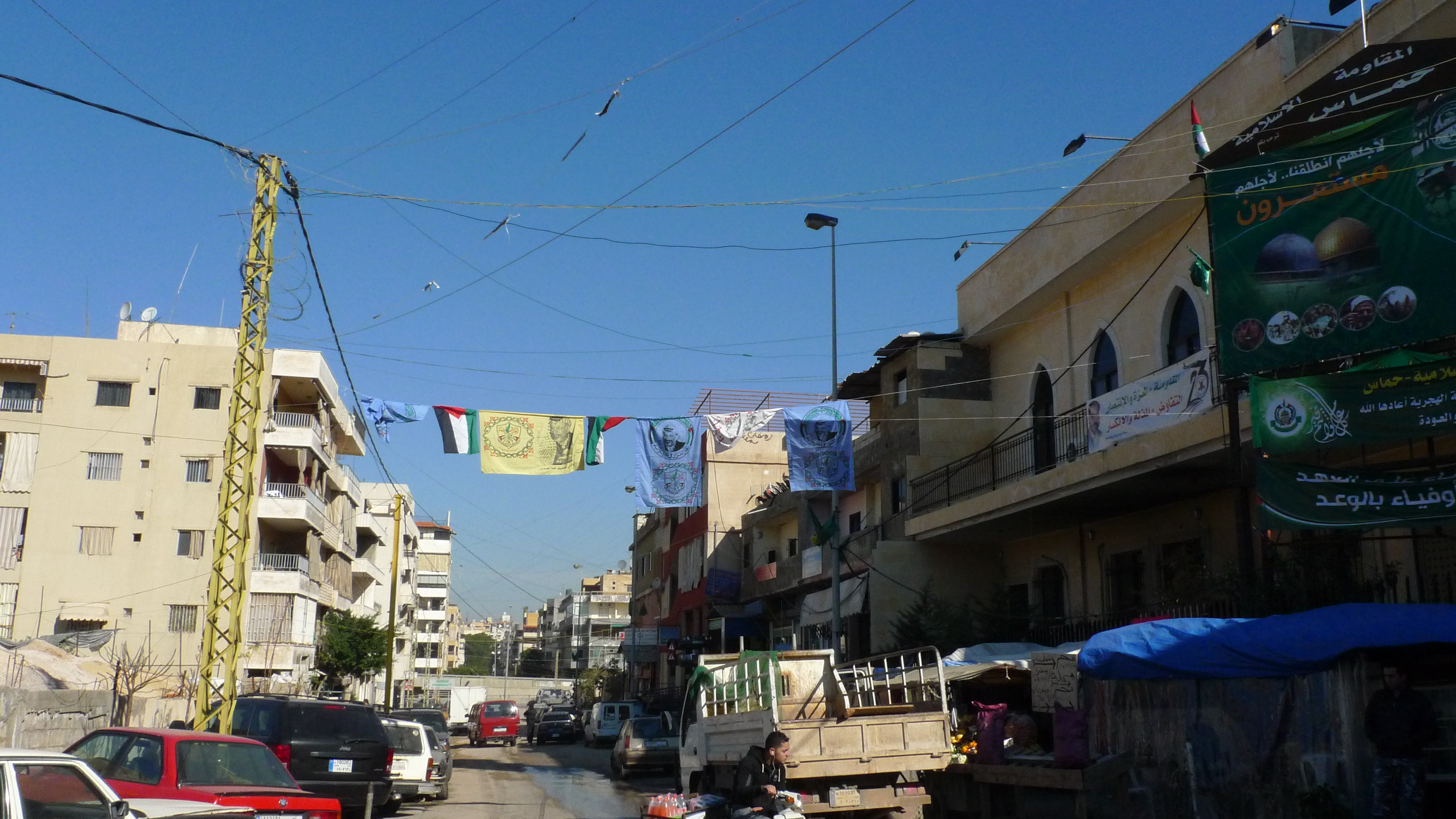
Entrance to the Bourj el-Barajneh refugee camp in southern Beirut

100,000 Palestinians fled to Lebanon because of the 1948 Arab–Israeli War and were not allowed to return. As of January 2015, there were 452,669 registered refugees in Lebanon.

In a 2007 study, Amnesty International denounced the "appalling social and economic condition" of Palestinians in Lebanon. Until 2005, Palestinians were forbidden to work in over 70 jobs because they do not have Lebanese citizenship, but this was later reduced to around 20 as of 2007 after liberalization laws. In 2010, Palestinians were granted the same rights to work as other foreigners in the country.

Lebanon gave citizenship to about 50,000 Christian Palestinian refugees during the 1950s and 1960s. In the mid-1990s, about 60,000 Shiite Muslim refugees were granted citizenship. This caused a protest from Maronite authorities, leading to citizenship being given to all Christian refugees who were not already citizens.

In the 2010s, many Palestinian refugees in Lebanon began immigrating to Europe, both legally and illegally, as part of the European migrant crisis, due to a deterioration in living conditions there as part of the Syrian civil war. In December 2015, sources told Al Jazeera that thousands of Palestinians were fleeing to Europe by way of Turkey, with about 4,000 having fled the Ain al-Hilweh camp alone in recent months. Many were reaching Germany, with others going to Russia, Sweden, Belgium, and Norway. A census completed in January 2018 found that only around 175,000 Palestinian refugees were living in Lebanon, as opposed to previous UNRWA figures which put the number at between 400,000 and 500,000, as well as other estimates that placed the number between 260,000 and 280,000.

According to writer and researcher Mudar Zahran, a Jordanian of Palestinian heritage, the media chose to deliberately ignore the conditions of the Palestinians living in Lebanese refugee camps, and that the "tendency to blame Israel for everything" has provided Arab leaders with an excuse to deliberately ignore the human rights of the Palestinian in their countries.

=== Syria ===
Syria had 528,616 registered Palestinian refugees in January 2015. There were 9 UNRWA refugee camps with 178,666 official Palestinian refugees.

As a result of the Syrian civil war, large numbers of Palestinian refugees fled Syria to Europe as part of the European migrant crisis, and to other Arab countries. In September 2015, a Palestinian official said that only 200,000 Palestinian refugees were left in Syria, with 100,000 Palestinian refugees from Syria in Europe and the remainder in other Arab countries.

=== Saudi Arabia ===
An estimated 240,000 Palestinians are living in Saudi Arabia.

=== Iraq ===
There were 34,000 Palestinian refugees living in Iraq prior to the Iraq War. In the aftermath of the war, the majority fled to neighboring Jordan and Syria, or were killed. Thousands lived as internally displaced persons within Iraq or were stranded in camps along Iraq's borders with Jordan and Syria, as no country in the region would accept them, and lived in temporary camps along the no man's land in the border zones.

=== Other countries ===
India agreed to take in 165 refugees, with the first group arriving in March 2006. Generally, they were unable to find work in India as they spoke only Arabic though some found employment with UNHCR's non-governmental partners. All of them were provided with free access to public hospitals. Of the 165 refugees, 137 of them later found clearance for resettlement in Sweden. In November 2006, 54 were granted asylum in Canada, and in 2007, some 200 were accepted for resettlement in Sweden and Iceland, and Brazil agreed to take 100.

In 2009, significant numbers of these refugees were allowed to resettle abroad. More than 1,000 were accepted by various countries in Europe and South America, and an additional 1,350 were cleared for resettlement in the United States. Another 68 were allowed to resettle in Australia. However, the majority of Palestine refugees strongly oppose resettlement and much rather want to return to their homes in the region of Palestine.

== Positions ==
On 11 December 1948 the United Nations General Assembly discussed Bernadotte's report and passed a resolution: "that refugees wishing to return to their homes and live at peace with their neighbour should be permitted to do so at the earliest practicable date." This General Assembly article 11 of Resolution 194 has been annually re-affirmed.

=== Israeli views ===
The Jewish Agency promised to the UN before 1948 that Palestinian Arabs would become full citizens of the State of Israel, and the Israeli declaration of independence invited the Arab inhabitants of Israel to "full and equal citizenship". In practice, Israel does not grant citizenship to the refugees, as it does to those Arabs who continue to reside in its borders. The 1947 Partition Plan determined citizenship based on residency, such that Arabs and Jews residing in Palestine but not in Jerusalem would obtain citizenship in the state in which they are resident. Professor of Law at Boston University Susan Akram, Omar Barghouti and Ilan Pappé have argued that Palestinian refugees from the envisioned Jewish State were entitled to normal Israeli citizenship based on laws of state succession.

In the 1967 Arab–Israeli War, Israel occupied territories including the Gaza Strip and the West Bank, which it captured from Egypt and Jordan respectively, gaining control over a substantial number of refugee camps. The Israeli government attempted to resettle them permanently by initiating a subsidized "build-your-own home" program. Israel provided land for refugees who chose to participate; the Palestinians bought building materials on credit and built their own houses, usually with friends. Israel provided the new neighborhoods with necessary services, such as schools and sewers. The United Nations General Assembly passed Resolutions 31/15 and 34/52, which condemned the program as a violation of the refugees' "inalienable right of return", and called upon Israel to stop the program. Thousands of refugees were resettled into various neighborhoods, but the program was suspended due to pressure from the PLO.

=== Arab states ===
Most Palestinian refugees live either in the West Bank or Gaza Strip, or the three original "host countries" of Jordan, Lebanon and Syria who unwillingly accepted the first wave of refugees in 1948; these refugees are supported by UNRWA. The small number of refugees who settled in Egypt or Iraq were supported directly by those countries' governments. Over the last seven decades, a number of refugees have migrated to other Arab states, particularly the Arab states of the Gulf, primarily as economic migrants.

Arab states' view of Palestinian refugees has varied over time. Arab governments have often supported the refugees in the name of Arab unity, or because they viewed the Palestinians as an important source of skilled human capital to support their economic development. However, Arab governments have also frequently "despised" the Palestinian refugees – either viewing them as a threat to demographic balance (as in Lebanon), or because of the "political message of freedom and emancipation that their 'Palestinian-ness' carried", or else because in some countries' history Palestinians have been "somewhat associated with strife and unrest".

Palestinian refugees have taken citizenship in other Arab states, most notably in Jordan. However, the conferring of citizenship is a sensitive topic, as "it is often perceived as allowing Israel to evade its responsibility towards the refugees". On 17 October 2023 during the Gaza war, Jordan's king Abdullah warned against pushing refugees into Egypt or Jordan, adding that the humanitarian situation must to be dealt with inside Gaza and the West Bank: "That is a red line, because I think that is the plan by certain of the usual suspects to try and create de facto issues on the ground. No refugees in Jordan, no refugees in Egypt."

Tashbih Sayyed, a fellow of the Foundation for Defense of Democracies, criticized Arab nations of violating human rights and making the children and grandchildren of Palestinian refugees second class citizens in Lebanon, Syria, or the Gulf States, and said that the UNRWA Palestine refugees "cling to the illusion that defeating the Jews will restore their dignity".

=== Palestinian views ===
Most Palestine refugees claim a Palestinian right of return. In lack of an own country, their claim is based on Article 13 of the Universal Declaration of Human Rights (UDHR), which declares that "Everyone has the right to leave any country including his own, and to return to his country", although it has been argued that the term only applies to citizens or nationals of that country. Although all Arab League members at the time (1948) – Egypt, Iraq, Lebanon, Saudi Arabia, Syria, and Yemen – voted against the resolution, they also cite the article 11 of United Nations General Assembly Resolution 194, which "Resolves that the refugees wishing to return to their homes and live at peace with their neighbors should be permitted to do so at the earliest practicable date, and that compensation should be paid for the property of those choosing not to return [...]." However it is currently a matter of dispute whether Resolution 194 referred only to the estimated 50,000 remaining Palestine refugees from the 1948 Palestine War, or additionally to their UNRWA-registered 4,950,000 descendants. The Palestinian National Authority supports this claim, and has been prepared to negotiate its implementation at the various peace talks. Both Fatah and Hamas hold a strong position for a claimed right of return, with Fatah being prepared to give ground on the issue while Hamas is not.

However, a report in Lebanon's Daily Star newspaper in which Abdullah Muhammad Ibrahim Abdullah, the Palestinian ambassador to Lebanon and the chairman of the Palestinian Legislative Council's Political and Parliamentary Affairs committees, said the proposed future Palestinian state would not be issuing Palestinian passports to UNRWA Palestine refugees – even refugees living in the West Bank and Gaza.

An independent poll by Khalil Shikaki was conducted in 2003 with 4,500 Palestinian refugee families of Gaza, West Bank, Jordan and Lebanon. It showed that the majority (54%) would accept a financial compensation and a place to live in West Bank or Gaza in place of returning to the exact place in modern-day Israel where they or their ancestors lived (this possibility of settlement is contemplated in the Resolution 194). Only 10% said they would live in Israel if given the option. The other third said they would prefer to live in other countries, or rejected the terms described. However, the poll has been criticized as "methodologically problematic" and "rigged". In 2003, nearly a hundred refugee organizations and NGOs in Lebanon denounced Shikaki's survey, as no local organization was aware of its implementation in Lebanon.

In a 2 January 2005 opinion poll conducted by the Palestinian Association for Human Rights involving Palestinian refugees in Lebanon:

- 96% refused to give up their right of return
- 3% answered contrary
- 1% did not answer

== The Oslo Accords ==
Upon signing the Oslo Accords in 1993, Israel, the EU and the US recognized PLO as the legitimate representative of the Palestinian people. In return, Yasser Arafat recognized the State of Israel and renounced terrorism. At the time, the accords were celebrated as a historic breakthrough. In accordance with these agreements, the Palestinian refugees began to be governed by an autonomous Palestinian Authority, and the parties agreed to negotiate the permanent status of the refugees, as early as 1996. However, events have halted the phasing process and made the likelihood of a future sovereign Palestinian state uncertain. In another development, a rift developed between Fatah in the West-Bank and Hamas in Gaza after Hamas won the 2006 elections. Among other differences, Fatah officially recognizes the Oslo Accords with Israel, whereas Hamas does not.

=== United States ===
As of May 2012, the United States Senate Appropriations Committee approved a definition of a Palestine refugee to include only those original Palestine refugees who were actually displaced between June 1946 and May 1948, resulting in an estimated number of 30,000.

== See also ==
- Estimates of the Palestinian Refugee flight of 1948
- Depopulated Palestinian locations in Israel
- Jewish exodus from Arab and Muslim countries
- Palestinian diaspora
