= Beñat =

- Gender: Male

Origin
- Origin: Germanic
- Meaning: "Strong" or "Brave" as a bear
- Region of origin: Basque

Other names
- Related names: Bernard

Beñat is a Basque masculine given name, a variant of Bernard, which is of Germanic origin. There are variants in other languages including the Spanish and Italian name Bernardo. While the Basque language does not have a feminine given name equivalent, other languages do, such as the French Bernardine. Beñat is uncommon as a surname. People with the name Beñat include:

- Beñat Achiary, Basque vocal improviser
- Beñat Albizuri (born 1981), Basque road bicycle racer
- Beñat de Jesús (born 2002), Spanish footballer
- Beñat Etxebarria (born 1987), Basque football player
- Beñat Fernández (born 2007), Spanish motorcycle racer
- Beñat Gerenabarrena (born 2003), Spanish footballer
- Beñat Intxausti (born 1986), Basque road racing cyclist
- Beñat Prados (born 2001), Spanish footballer
- Beñat San José (born 1979), Basque football manager
- Beñat Turrientes (born 2002), Spanish footballer
- Beñat Txoperena (born 1981), Spanish cyclist
- Beñat Urkiola (born 1998), Spanish singer
