= Galina Stepanovna Nikitina =

Soviet lawyer and orientalist

Galina Stepanovna Nikitina (Russian: Галина Степановна Никитина; 1924 – 20 March 1982) — Soviet lawyer and orientalist, Candidate of Juridical Sciences (1953), Doctor of Historical Sciences (1977), author of the book «The State of Israel» (Russian: «Государство Израиль») – the first monographic study in Soviet literature of the history and economics of the state of Israel.

== Early life and education ==
Born into a family of employees. Her mother is Zinaida Ivanovna Nikitina (Russian: Зинаида Ивановна Никитина). In 1948, Galina Stepanovna graduated from the Institute of Foreign Trade. In 1953 she graduated from graduate school at the Institute of Law of the USSR Academy of Sciences. In 1953, Galina defended her dissertation on «The International Legal Regime of the Suez Canal» (Russian: «Международно-правовой режим Суэцкого канала») and received the academic degree of Candidate of Juridical Sciences.

== Career and research ==
In 1956, Stepanova’s book was published, The Suez Canal is the national treasure of the Egyptian people (Russian: «Суэцкий канал — национальное достояние египетского народа»); this book was translated into German and Arabic and published in them in 1957. From 1957 until her last days, Nikitina was a research fellow at the Institute of Oriental Studies of the USSR Academy of Sciences. She devoted almost 25 years of her life to researching the problems of the Middle East. In 1968 she wrote the book «The State of Israel: A Historical, Economic and Political Study» (Russian: «Государство Израиль : Особенности экономического и политического развития»), this book has been translated and published in Arabic (1969), Polish (1970) and English (1973). Stepanova is the author of the article «Israel» in the third edition of the Great Soviet Encyclopedia. In 1977, Galina defended her dissertation «The State of Israel: Features of Economic and Political Development» (Russian: «Государство Израиль: Особенности экономического и политического развития») and received the academic degree of Doctor of Historical Sciences. Stepanova member of the CPSU. She worked as a senior researcher at the Institute of Oriental Studies of the USSR Academy of Sciences. Nikitina did a lot of public work. She was the chairman of the Asian Commission of the Soviet Women's Committee, was elected a member of the board of the Soviet-Iraqi Friendship Society, took an active part in the work of the Soviet Afro-Asian Solidarity Committee, the Soviet Peace Committee, and the Russian Palestine Society .

The scope of her scientific interests: criticism of the concepts of chauvinism, expansionism and racism, which, according to Stepanova, are inherent in the ideology and political practice of Zionism.

== Death ==
She died after a long and serious illness.

== Works ==
=== In Russian ===
- Международно-правовой режим Суэцкого канала : Автореферат дис. на соискание учен. степени кандидата юрид. наук / Ин-т права Акад. наук СССР. - Москва : [б. и.], 1953. - 16 с.; 22 см.
- Международно-правовой режим Суэцкого канала : диссертация ... кандидата юридических наук : 12.00.00. - Москва, 1953. - 468 с.
- Идеологическая работа партийных организаций : [Сборник статей]. - Москва : Госполитиздат, 1956. - 199 с.; 21 см.// Статьи, опубликованные в 1956 г. в газете «Правда», в журнале «Коммунист», «Партийная жизнь» и «Московский пропагандист» // Авторы: Галина Степановна Никитина, Мария Николаевна Рындина, Михаил Зиновьевич Цунц.
- Суэцкий канал — национальное достояние египетского народа. - Москва : Госполитиздат, 1956. - 84 с.; 20 см.
- Экономическое положение стран Азии и Африки в 1957 г. и в первой половине 1958 г: Обзор. - Москва : Изд-во вост. лит., 1959 - 296 с. // Автор главы: Израиль, С. 205–225.
- Палестина после второй мировой войны. Образование государства Израиль и его внешняя политика в 1948—1951 гг. в книге: Международные отношения на Ближнем и Среднем Востоке / АН СССР. Ин-т экономики и междунар. отношений. - Москва : Междунар. отношения, 1967. - 296 с.; 20 см.
- Государство Израиль : (Особенности экон. и полит. развития) / АН СССР. Ин-т народов Азии. - Москва : Наука, 1968. - 413 с.; 21 см.
- Сионизм — орудие империализма. С. 114–121, в книге: Реакционная сущность сионизма : Сборник материалов. - Москва : Политиздат, 1972. - 206 с.; 20 см.
- Сионизм: теория и практика / [Ред. коллегия: В. В. Богословский и др.]. - Москва : Политиздат, 1973. - 240 с.; 20 см. На обороте тит. л. авт.: И. И. Минц, Д. С. Асанов, Д. С. Астахов и др.// Автор глав: Сионизм и империализм, 40―82 с., Международный сионизм, его организации и цели, 83―99 с.
- Государство Израиль : Особенности экономического и политического развития : Автореф. дис. на соиск. учен. степени д-ра ист. наук : (07.00.03) / Акад. обществ. наук при ЦК КПСС. Кафедра междунар. ком. и рабочего движения. - Москва : [б. и.], 1977. - 63 с.
- Международный сионизм: история и политика : (Сборник статей) / АН СССР, Ин-т востоковедения; Ред. коллегия: В. И. Киселев Г. С. Никитина, Л. Ф. Федченко. - Москва : Наука, 1977. - 176 с.; 20 см.

=== In English ===
- The State of Israel: A Historical, Economic and Political Study / By Galina Nikitina / 1973, Progress Publishers

=== In German ===
- Der Suezkanal, nationales Eigentum des ägyptischen Volkes // Galina S. Nikitina / Deutscher Verlag der Wissenschaften, 1957

=== In Arabic ===
- قانا السويس: ملكية وطنية للشعب المصري, 1957
- دولة إسرائيل: خصائص التطور السياسي والاقتصادي, 1969

=== In Polish ===
- Państwo Izrael: zarys rozwoju gospodarczego i politycznego / Galina Nikitina; [tł. z ros. Kazimierz Rurka]. Warszawa : Książka i Wiedza, 1970. - 439, [13] s.; 20 cm.
