= São Domingos do Sul =

Municipality in Rio Grande do Sul, Brazil

Coordinates: 28°32′S 51°54′W

- Municipality
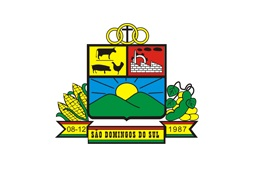
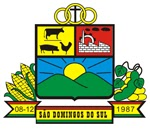
- Flag Coat of arms
- Interactive map of São Domingos do Sul
- Country: Brazil
- Time zone: UTC−3 (BRT)

Location of São Domingos do Sul

São Domingos do Sul is a municipality in the Brazilian state of Rio Grande do Sul. It is situated at a latitude of 28º31'51 South and a longitude of 51º53'16" West. As of 2020, it has an estimated population of 3,083 inhabitants on an area of 78.67 km². Its current mayor is Domingos Scartazzini.

== See also ==
- List of municipalities in Rio Grande do Sul
