= Bernardas =

- Gender: Male
- Language: Lithuanian
- Name day: 20 August

Origin
- Region of origin: Lithuania

Other names
- Related names: Bernard

Bernardas is a Lithuanian masculine given name. Individuals with the name Bernardas include:

- Bernardas Bučas (1903–1979) Lithuanian painter and sculptor
- Bernardas Brazdžionis (1907–2002), Lithuanian poet
- Bernardas Fridmanas (1859–1939), Lithuanian lawyer, judge, journalist, politician and Jewish activist
- Bernardas Vasiliauskas (born 1938), Lithuanian pianist and organist
