= Bernadetta von Varley =

Fire Emblem: Three Houses character

- Fire Emblem character
- Bernadetta von Varley in Fire Emblem Heroes
- First game: Fire Emblem: Three Houses (2019)
- Designed by: Chinatsu Kurahana
- Voiced by: EN: Erica Mendez; JA: Ayumi Tsuji

In-universe information
- Affiliation: Black Eagles
- Weapon: Bow and arrows

Bernadetta von Varley (Japanese: ベルナデッタ＝フォン＝ヴァーリ, Hepburn: Berunadetta fon Vāri) is a character in the 2019 video game Fire Emblem: Three Houses. She is a student of Garreg Mach Monastery, and a member of the Black Eagles house under Edelgard von Hresvelg. She is a recluse who fears most people, with her fears and trauma being the product of abuse by her father. She also appears in other Fire Emblem games, including Fire Emblem Heroes and Fire Emblem Warriors: Three Hopes.

She has generally been well received, with her background of trauma from abuse becoming discussed by critics, with a number of people finding it relatable, such as writer Gita Jackson and Dylan Farrow. She has also been a popular character in Three Houses, voted the best female character according to a Famitsu poll of Japanese players.

== Appearances ==
Bernadetta is a playable character in the video game Fire Emblem: Three Houses, belonging to the Black Eagles house under Edelgard von Hresvelg. Bernadetta spends much of the game's non-combat sections in her room, only very rarely coming out of her room at first except for when she is taken into battle. She is able to have dialogue with certain characters both in and out of the Black Eagles, including the protagonist, Byleth, whom she can enter into a romance with if the character is male instead of female. Across various conversations between Bernadetta and other characters, including Byleth, Edelgard, and others, Bernadetta divulges her traumas caused by her father, among others. While she is initially only available if Byleth chooses to serve as the professor of the Black Eagles, she can be recruited by the player even if they join the Blue Lions or Golden Deer under the right circumstances. Following the timeskip, Bernadetta by default will be on Edelgard's side in Edelgard's war to end the Crest system and unify Fodlan, unless she is recruited into another house. She has various paired endings that she can have with specific characters, including Edelgard and male Byleth.

Bernadetta also appears as a playable character in the sequel, Fire Emblem Warriors: Three Hopes, a Dynasty Warriors-style hack-and-slash that explores an alternate version of events where Byleth did not become the professor at Garreg Mach. Bernadetta was included as a playable character in the mobile game Fire Emblem Heroes. Various alternate versions of Bernadetta have been released later on, including Bernadettas themed after Christmas and Easter.

A figurine of Bernadetta was released by Good Smile as part of their Pop Up Parade line, released alongside Edelgard.

== Concept and creation ==
Bernadetta was created by Chinatsu Kurahana for the video game Fire Emblem: Three Houses. Bernadetta is a recluse, perceiving benign interactions with other students as potentially malicious. Bernadetta is voiced in English by Erica Mendez and in Japanese by Ayumi Tsuji. Mendez felt that multiple aspects of Bernadetta were relatable to her, discussing how they both have social anxiety and reclusive nature. In the English localization of the game, a scene depicting Bernadetta detailing her abuse by her father was changed. The reason for the change has not yet been confirmed by Nintendo. When making her design for Fire Emblem Warriors: Three Hopes, character designer Toshiyuki Kusakihara discussed how he designed her and others with the idea of how they might look had they never met Byleth. Director of Three Hopes, Hayato Iwata discussed having been confused by her new hairstyle, though having come to appreciate it in the end.

== Reception ==
Bernadetta has been generally well received by fans and critics. In a Famitsu poll of Japanese readers, Bernadetta was ranked as the best female character in Three Houses. She was also among the most popular first S Links that these players experienced in the game. Video Gamer writer Imogen Donovan speculated that her popularity in this poll was due to players identifying with her. Nintendo World Report writer Daan Koopman considered her his favorite character in the game, finding her anxiety and the reason behind it intriguing. The Gamer writer Stacey Henley praised her first design, discussing how her disheveled look reflected how she only ever went out when absolutely necessary. She also discussed how she contrasted to Dorothea's design, who has to compensate for her comparative lack of income by always looking her best. She felt that this contrast should have carried over with their later designs, but she found that the design was not well done. She felt that it looked somewhat like how a recluse would do her hair, but also that it was too "neat and straight" for that to be the case. She also criticized her outfit, saying that while it's not sexualized, it didn't match her style. She speculated that this might have been meant to reflect how she is uncomfortable with adult expectations, the fact that she is back at Garreg Mach in post-timeskip should give her the freedom to dress more comfortably. Polygon staff identified her as their favorite Three Houses character to romance; writer Petrana Radulovic called her "the best" and said she went out of her way to recruit her.

The depiction of her trauma and abuse has been the subject of discussion by critics, with EGMNow writer Malindy Hetfeld discussing how Bernadetta recognizes the root of her trauma as being her father's abuse, and works to change things. Despite still being a recluse, Hetfeld notes how she is able to learn to love herself. Kotaku writer Gita Jackson discussed how, despite Bernadetta's abuse being more fantastical, it rang true to her own experiences, particularly Bernadetta's fear and eventual recovery. She discussed how Bernadetta's experiences with her father informed her lack of self-worth, as well as how players see Bernadetta's abuse through how she expects to be abused for not living up to people's expectations. She appreciated that KOEI Tecmo opted for this instead of showing the abuse, feeling that this was effective enough. Gita also discussed how her anxiety is played for laughs at times, but felt that the joke was never on Bernadetta; rather, she felt it reflected a lack of understanding her peers had for her. Dylan Farrow, daughter of Mia Farrow and stepdaughter of Woody Allen who accused him of sexual assault as a child, discussed how she identified with Bernadetta. In particular, she related to Bernadetta's social aversions, as well as discussing how her Bernadetta's trauma comes from her abuse. Time writer Eliana Dockterman commented that Dylan Farrow's tribulations and her overcoming them reflected Bernadetta's willingness to fight as needed.

The change to Bernadetta's dialogue about her being tied to the chair received mixed reception from fans. Some fans felt that it made the abuse she suffered from seem lighter, while others argued that it is more accurate to the Japanese material, and fit Bernadetta's character, who they felt would not be that open about her abuse. Comic Book writer Tyler Fischer felt that the change was strange, as they didn't think anyone was talking about it beforehand. He felt that it made sense why they changed it due to the detail of the abuse, but also felt the new version seemed like an "incomplete thought".

Endless Mode writer Dia Lacina discussed how her interactions with Bernadetta, among other students, helped inform her views on professors' involvement in student lives. She discussed how Bernadetta was one of her favorite students, and how she prioritizes her. She also speculated that she might have post-traumatic stress disorder. While discussing new supports in Three Hopes, The Mary Sue writer Madeline Carpou expressed excitement that conversations between Bernadetta and Marianne were included in it, feeling that it was a missed opportunity to not have them interact in Three Houses. She worried that it may be "needlessly uncomfortable" due to their social anxiety, but came to enjoy the idea of them practicing socializing together enough that she questioned whether she might see them in a romantic light.
