= Bernardo de Sousa Campos =

Brazilian politician and lawyer (1869–1930)

Personal details
- Born: 1869 Brotas, Brazil
- Died: 1930 (aged 60–61)

Bernardo de Sousa Campos (1869 – 1930) was a Brazilian politician and lawyer.

== Early life ==
He was the youngest son of Jose de Sousa Campos and Maria Gertrudes de Sousa Campos, and a great-great-grandson of Barreto Leme and Sousa Siqueira, founders of Campinas.

== Education ==
He held a degree in Law and Social Sciences and was a prominent attorney in São Paulo. He served as a member of parliament at the State and Federal levels, acting chief of police and attorney general for the republic in the state capital.

== Personal life ==
Married on 8 May 1894 in São Paulo, to Eulalia Maria Pinheiro de Sousa Campos (1869–1933), from Brotas.
