= Bernard Chenez =

French cartoonist and writer

Bernard Chenez (born 1946) is a French cartoonist and writer. He has published more than 20 compilations, bringing together his editorial cartoons for L'Équipe, L'Événement du jeudi and Le Monde. He has also published works of fiction and nonfiction: Les Mains dans les poches, Le Resquilleur du Louvre and Le Journal sans heures.
