= Bernadette (disambiguation) =

Bernadette is a given name.

Bernadette may also refer to:

- Bernadette (singer) (born 1959), Dutch singer
- "Bernadette" (Four Tops song), 1967
- "Bernadette" (IAMX song), 2011
- Bernadette (film), a 2023 French biographical film

== See also ==
- Bernadotte (disambiguation)
- Bernadetta
