= Bernard Hall =

Bernard Hall may refer to:

- Bernard Hall (footballer) (1942–2025), English footballer
- Bernard Hall (American football) (born 1967), American football player
- Lindsay Bernard Hall (1859–1935), Australian artist
