= Bernadotte, Minnesota =

Bernadotte
- Unincorporated community
- Location within Minnesota Location within the United States
- Coordinates: 44°27′19″N 94°18′04″W
- Country: United States
- State: Minnesota
- County: Nicollet
- Township: Bernadotte Township
- Elevation: 1,004 ft (306 m)
- Time zone: UTC-6 (Central (CST))
  - Summer (DST): UTC-5 (CDT)
- ZIP code: 56054
- Area code: 507
- GNIS feature ID: 639970

Bernadotte is an unincorporated community in Bernadotte Township, Nicollet County, Minnesota, United States, near Lafayette. The community is located near the junction of Nicollet County Roads 1 and 10.

Bernadotte is the home of Historic Marker: Bernadotte Lutheran Church and Historic Marker: Bernadotte Co-op Creamery.

Bernadotte is also the home of the world's largest collection of cow-related items, amassed by local celebrity and resident Ruth Klossner. This record was officially approved by Guinness World Records on June 9, 2015.

== History ==
A post office called Bernadotte was established in 1871, and remained in operation until 1904. The community was named for Jean Baptiste Jules Bernadotte, a French Jacobines leader, later French Marshal, later King Charles XIV of Sweden and Charles III of Norway and founder of the House of Bernadotte.
