= Bernhardi =

Bernhardi may refer to:

== People ==
- Friedrich von Bernhardi (1849–1930), Prussian general
- Johann Jakob Bernhardi (1774–1850), German doctor and botanist
- August Ferdinand Bernhardi (1769–1820), German linguist and writer
- Bartholomäus Bernhardi of Feldkirchen (1487–1551), German scholar and Lutheran priest

== Animals and plants ==
- Prince Bernhard's titi (Callicebus bernhardi), a species of New World monkey
- Bernardia, a plant genus

== See also ==
- Bernhard (disambiguation)
