= Bernard Caprasse =

Belgian politician

Governor of Luxembourg
- In office 4 June 1996 – 31 January 2016
- Succeeded by: Olivier Schmitz

Personal details
- Born: 24 January 1949 (age 77) Lierneux, Belgium
- Party: Centre démocrate humaniste
- Education: Université Catholique de Louvain

Bernard Caprasse (born 24 January 1949) is a Belgian politician. He was governor of the province of Luxembourg from 1996 until 2016. He is a member of the Centre démocrate humaniste.

== Biography ==
Caprasse was born on 24 January 1949 in Lierneux. He obtained a licentiate in law at the Université catholique de Louvain in 1972. He worked as a lawyer in Brussels from 1972 to 1975, and in Marche-en-Famenne between 1975 and 1996. He became governor of the province of Luxembourg on 4 June 1996.

In January 2015 he announced that he would retire early 2016. Olivier Schmitz was appointed by the Walloon Government as his successor, effective 1 February 2016.
