= Bernard Smith (sailboat designer) =

Bernard Smith (May 15, 1910 – February 12, 2010) was a US rocket scientist and speed sailboat designer, father of the "aerohydrofoil" sailboat concept.

== Life and background ==
Smith was born in 1910 in New York City, to Jewish Russian immigrants. One of a pair of fraternal twins, he moved to California in 1935, where he worked as a welder for the Fruehauf Trailer company. Smith came from a background of blacksmiths and he later was a founder of American rocket science becoming a director of the naval weapons laboratory in Virginia. He is best known today for his writing in “The 40-Knot Sailboat”. After World War II, with an honorary degree in physics from Reed College in Oregon, he started working as a civilian scientist in the US Navy, serving at the Naval Air Weapons Station China Lake and later at the Naval Weapons Laboratory at Dahlgren , where he served as the technical director from 1964 until his retirement in 1973. In recognition of his ingenuity and determination, the U.S. Navy established the Bernard Smith Award, given annually for scientific and technical achievements accomplished “by exceptional persistence and competence in the face of unusual odds or significant opposition.” He died on 12 February 2010 from liver cancer at age 99.

== Bernard Smith’s 40-knot sailboat design ==
In 1963, Smith published The 40-knot Sailboat, in which he set out an innovative sailboat design inspired by the traditional proa sailed by the peoples of the Pacific Ocean. Smith's designs revolved around the concept of the "aerohydrofoil," where the boat's keel and sail are separated from each other by an outrigger system. The idea proved highly influential for subsequent designers. Almost 50 years after its publication, the Vestas Sailrocket, which was largely based on Smith's ideas, broke the world speed sailing record.

== Publications ==
- Smith, Bernard (1963). The 40-knot Sailboat. New York NY: Grosset & Dunlap. LCCN 63-18980. OCLC 1394738.
- Smith, Bernard (1989). Sailloons and Fliptackers: The Limits to High-Speed Sailing. Washington: AIAA. ISBN 0930403657.
- Smith, Bernard (2004). The Ultimate Sailboat. Self-published. OCLC 811646415.
