= Bernhard Seidenath =

German politician (born 1968)

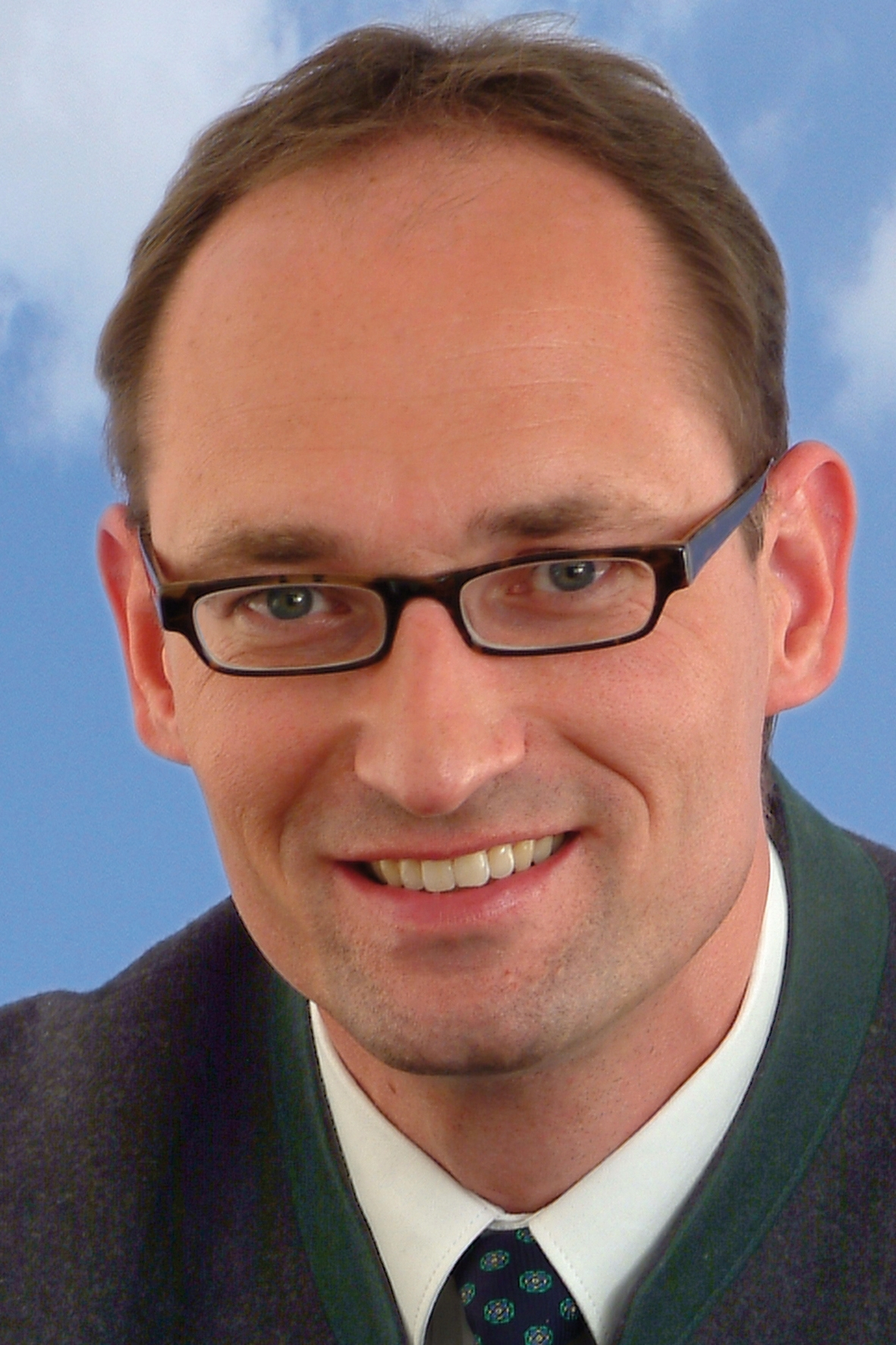
- Seidenath in 2008

Member of the Landtag of Bavaria
- Incumbent
- Assumed office 20 October 2008
- Preceded by: Blasius Thätter
- Constituency: Dachau

Personal details
- Born: 8 November 1968 (age 57) Erlangen
- Party: Christian Social Union (since 1989)

Bernhard Seidenath (born 8 November 1968 in Erlangen) is a German politician serving as a member of the Landtag of Bavaria since 2008. He has served as chairman of the Christian Social Union in Dachau since 2011.
