= Bernard Stoeser =

American politician

Member of the South Dakota House of Representatives
- In office 1973–1974

Personal details
- Born: October 23, 1930
- Died: March 9, 2024 (aged 93)
- Party: Democratic

Bernard Stoeser (October 23, 1930 – March 9, 2024) was an American politician. He served as a Democratic member of the South Dakota House of Representatives.

== Life and career ==
Stoeser attended Pierre High School.

Stoeser served in the South Dakota House of Representatives from 1973 to 1974.

Stoeser died on March 9, 2024, at the age of 93.
