= Bernadotte Township, Nicollet County, Minnesota =

Bernadotte Township, Minnesota
- Township
- Location within the state of Minnesota Bernadotte Township, Minnesota (the United States)
- Coordinates: 44°24′46″N 94°18′4″W
- Country: United States
- State: Minnesota
- County: Nicollet

Area
  - Total: 35.9 sq mi (93.1 km^{2})
  - Land: 35.9 sq mi (93.1 km^{2})
  - Water: 0 sq mi (0.0 km^{2})
- Elevation: 988 ft (301 m)

Population (2000)
  - Total: 346
  - Density: 9.6/sq mi (3.7/km^{2})
- Time zone: UTC-6 (Central (CST))
  - Summer (DST): UTC-5 (CDT)
- FIPS code: 27-05410
- GNIS feature ID: 0663576

Bernadotte Township is a township in Nicollet County, Minnesota, United States. The population was 245 at the 2023 census. There is an unincorporated community named Bernadotte that is located in the northern part of the township.

Bernadotte Township was organized in 1869, and named for Jean Baptiste Jules Bernadotte, a French Jacobines leader, later French marshal, later King Charles XIV John of Sweden and Charles III of Norway and founder of the House of Bernadotte.

== Geography ==
According to the United States Census Bureau, the township has a total area of 35.9 square miles (93 km^{2}), all land.

== Demographics ==
At the 2000 census, there were 346 people, 110 households and 91 families residing in the township. The population density was 9.6 per square mile (3.7/km^{2}). There were 114 housing units at an average density of 3.2 per square mile (1.2/km^{2}). The racial make-up of the township was 98.55% White and 1.45% from two or more races. Hispanic or Latino of any race were 0.29% of the population.

There were 110 households, of which 47.3% had children under the age of 18 living with them, 80.0% were married couples living together, 1.8% had a female householder with no husband present and 16.4% were non-families. 16.4% of all households were made up of individuals and 5.5% had someone living alone who was 65 years of age or older. The average household size was 3.15 and the average family size was 3.55.

37.0% of the population were under the age of 18, 3.8% from 18 to 24, 29.2% from 25 to 44, 20.2% from 45 to 64 and 9.8% were 65 years of age or older. The median age was 34 years. For every 100 females, there were 112.3 males. For every 100 females age 18 and over, there were 111.7 males.

The median household income was $43,333 and the median family income was $43,750. Males had a median income of $27,411 and females $23,750. The per capita income was $15,233. About 7.1% of families and 6.0% of the population were below the poverty line, including 3.0% of those under age 18 and 16.1% of those age 65 or over.
