= Bernard Wilson =

Bernard Wilson may refer to:

- Barney Wilson, head coach for the William & Mary Tribe men's basketball team
- Bernard Wilson (American football) (born 1970), former American football player
- Bernard Wilson (singer) (1946–2010), American R&B, funk and soul music vocalist
- Bernard Wilson (boxer) (born 1962), Grenadian Olympic boxer

== See also ==
- Bernard Willson (1919–1994), British linguist
- Bernard Willson (cricketer) (1935–1997), English cricketer
