= Bernhard Brenner =

German physiologist (died 2017)

Bernhard Brenner is a scientist who, through his experiments, elucidated the repeated cycles of stretch and release of muscle fibers under isometric conditions. Because of this, these cycles were named as "Brenner Cycles".

== Biography ==
Brenner was born in Stuttgart, capital of Baden-Württenberg state in Germany. He studied medicine at the University of Tübingen between the years of 1969-1975 and received his doctoral degree in 1979. In 1980, Bernhard Brenner became associate researcher visitor at National Institute of Health (NIH) where he clarified that, when the muscle is in its relaxed state, the complex tropomyosin-troponin does not block cross-bridge bounds to actin. Due to this revelation, the pathway of muscle contraction was decoded, and then he correlated a rate of force for muscle redevelopment under calcium regulation called K_{TR} to the number of cross-bridges turnover kinetics. Until 1985, Bernhard Brenner worked with other colleagues Richard Podolsky, Evan Eisenberg, Joseph Chalovich, Lois Greene, Mark Schoenberg, and Leepo Yu, and after this period, Bernhard Brenner returned to Germany and became professor and director of the Institute for Molecular and Cell Physiology at Hannover Medical School (MHH). Later in his career, he started to study mutations in cardiac myosin related to hypertrophic cardiomyopathy. He died in 2017, from cancer.
