= Bernard Parrish =

American politician (1919–1999)

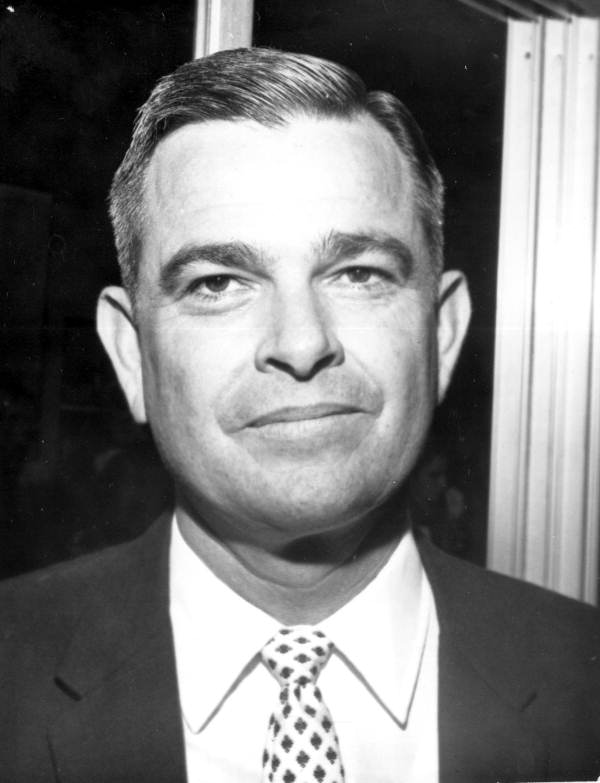
- Parrish in 1961

Member of the Florida Senate from the 37th district
- In office 1961–1963

Personal details
- Born: August 2, 1919 Titusville, Florida, U.S.
- Died: August 16, 1999 (aged 80)
- Party: Democratic

Bernard Parrish (August 2, 1919 – August 16, 1999) was an American politician. He served as a Democratic member for the 37th district of the Florida Senate.

== Life and career ==
Parrish was born in Titusville, Florida. He served in the United States Army during World War II.

Parrish served in the Florida Senate from 1961 to 1963, representing the 37th district.

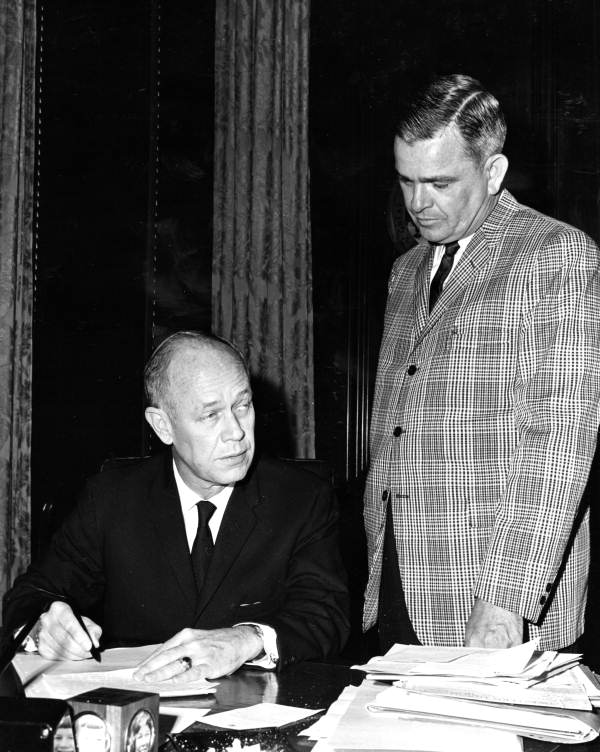
Parrish (right) with C. Farris Bryant, 1961

Parrish died on August 16, 1999, at the age of 80.
