= Bernhardt Creek =

Stream in Lane County, Oregon, U.S.

Coordinates: 43°59′19″N 124°00′54″W

Bernhardt Creek is a stream in Lane County, Oregon, in the United States. The creek was named for the Bernhardt family of early settlers. It flows mostly west-northwest to its mouth at the Siuslaw River about 4.5 miles (7.2 km) east of Florence.

== See also ==
- List of rivers of Oregon
