= Bernhardt Jungmann =

German botanist (1671–1747)

Bernhardt Jungmann (1671–1747) was a German botanist who was a professor in Germany and visited the Thirteen Colonies.

== Biography ==
Jungmann was born in Ronneburg. He studied at the University of Leipzig, and was professor of botany and chemistry in the University of Göttingen in 1702, and the University of Kiel in 1709. In 1712 he went to Leiden, and was sent by the Dutch government on a scientific mission to America. He visited successively Canada, New England, Mexico, Cuba, and Puerto Rico 1715–1724, and lived several years in Saint Eustache and Saint Lucia, returning in 1727 to Leiden.

He went again to Mexico in 1744, but was persecuted and imprisoned for his faith. He died there of yellow fever a few days before his intended departure for Europe.

== Works ==
- Fasciculus plantarum rariarum et exoticarum (Leyden, 1728)
- Naturalis dispositio echinodermatum (1731)
- Historia piscium naturalis (1732)
- Historia adium (1733)
- Tantamen methodi astrocologicae, sive dispositio naturalis cochlidum et concharum (2 vols., 1741)
- Methodus plantarum genuina (1743)
- Enumeratio plantarum circa Mexico sponte provenientium (Mexico, 1746)
- Thesaurus plantarum americanarum (2 vols., 1747)

He also contributed papers to the academies of sciences of Paris and Vienna, on Mexican antiquities, which were inserted in the Recueil des mémoires de l'académie, and reprinted in the Blätter für literarische Unterhaltung (Brunswick, 1837).
