= Bernard de Montréal =

Canadian psychologist and author (1939–2003)

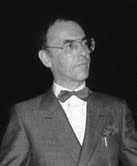
Bernard de Montréal

Bernard de Montréal (pseudonym of Bernard Boucher) (July 26, 1939 – October 15, 2003) was a Canadian author and lecturer. The author defined his teachings as Psychologie Évolutionnaire, which translates into English as Evolutionary Psychology (not to be confused with the similar term applying to a branch of cognitive psychology that draws on the sociobiological theories of natural evolution).

The term "Evolutionary Psychology", in context of its use in Bernard de Montréal's work refers to the study of human evolution, that is to say the study of mankind's return to his multidimensional source and to his awareness of this. It describes an ascending, individuating process leading to his multidimensional reality, whereas the naïve or unconscious soul, involved collectively in spiritualizing the material dimensions through its domination by "belief systems", is a descending or incarnating, collective experience, or involution, as it is termed by the author.

== Life and Works ==
Bernard de Montréal was born in Montreal, Quebec, Canada on July 26, 1939. The author received his early education at Collège Sainte-Croix, a Catholic classical institution. After graduation, he went on to study anthropology at the University of Albuquerque in New Mexico. While in New Mexico, Bernard de Montréal experienced a transformation that was the starting point for his exploration of the human mind through telepsychism. From then onwards, he began conscious channeling, a practice that would launch his life's work, on a variety of topics ranging from paranormal phenomena to evolutionary psychology.

In addition to three published books and numerous conferences and seminars, he was introduced to Quebec audiences by esotericist and ufologist Richard Glenn's TV show Ésotérisme expérimental in 1977. He thereafter continued teaching and speaking in public until his death in 2003.

== Teachings ==
As a percipient, Bernard de Montréal used automatic writing as well as mental dictation to capture and express an inner communication which he later termed "fusion". These distinct modes of expression were characteristic of his lectures and teachings. According to theologian Richard Bergeron (théologien), Bernard de Montréal's teachings can be echoed by "Western gnostic doctrines," more specifically to "cosmic science groups" which "propose a philosophy of life postulating that man is a product of the universe and belongs to the cosmic totality. (…) The author held that this knowledge was universal and accessible to all, through man's own internal source. He added that mankind's tendency to identify egoically to thought, leading to conceptual appropriation, often makes knowledge obsolete rather than self-generating and self-confirming through time. He considered the echo of similar concepts to be revealing of this fact, where directly accessed universal knowledge resurfaces or is channelled throughout the ages and across continents, irrespective of cultural settings.

His teachings considered numerous subjects including:

- Consciousness
- Origins of thought
- Soul experience
- The concept of "Cosmic Lie"
- Evolution vs. Involution
- Mental illness
- The Individual vs. the Collective Mind
- The Supramental (a concept also described by Sri Aurobindo Supermind (integral yoga), "Supramental descent" and "Supramental transformation")
- The Death or Astral World

== Legacy ==
After 26 years of teaching, lecturing and appearing as a guest in interviews, Bernard de Montréal died at the age of 64, survived by his wife and daughter. The author left a legacy of nearly 2,000 recorded teachings. Two of his books were originally published in French. The third book, Beyond the Mind, was first published in English in 1998. The second edition in English was published in 2010 and its French translation in 2011. The English translations of his works remain unpublished along with numerous essays and writings.

== Published works - Out of Print ==
- La Genèse du Réel; Editions de la Science Intégrale (1988); ISBN 978-2-921139-00-7 (French)
- Dialogue avec l'Invisible; Éditions de la Science Intégrale (1997); ISBN 978-2-912366-00-9 (French)
- Beyond the Mind (2nd Edition); iUniverse Publishing (2010); ISBN 978-1-4502-6133-3 (English)
- Par-delà le Mental, iUniverse Publishing, (2011); ISBN 978-1-4502-9746-2 (French)
