= Bernadotte plan =

UN mediation between Arabs and Jews in 1948

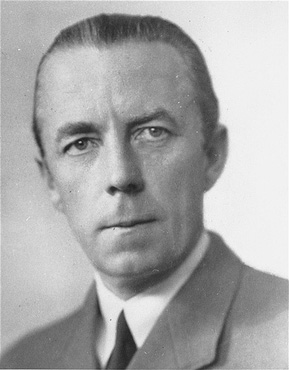
Count Folke Bernadotte, the United Nations Mediator for Palestine

The Bernadotte plan officially known as Progress Report of the United Nations Mediator on Palestine submitted to the Secretary-General for transmission to the members of the United Nations was a plan submitted by the United Nations Mediator on Palestine, Count Folke Bernadotte to the Third Session of the United Nations General Assembly. It was published on September 16, 1948, one day before Bernadotte was assassinated by members of Lehi.

The report deals with the mediation efforts between Jews and Arabs in Palestine, the two UN supervised truces in the 1948 Arab–Israeli War (June 11 – July 9, 1948 and July 18 to the time the report was written) and with the refugee situation. Bernadotte was an ardent supporter of the Arab refugees right to return; in the report, he strongly urged the provisional Israeli government to let them return to their homes:

It would be an offense against the principles of elemental justice if these innocent victims of the conflict were denied the right to return to their homes while Jewish immigrants flow into Palestine, and, indeed, at least offer the threat of permanent replacement of the Arab refugees who have been rooted in the land for centuries.

He also detailed his correspondence with Israeli officials regarding the refugee problem and their denial of his appeal.

== First proposal ==
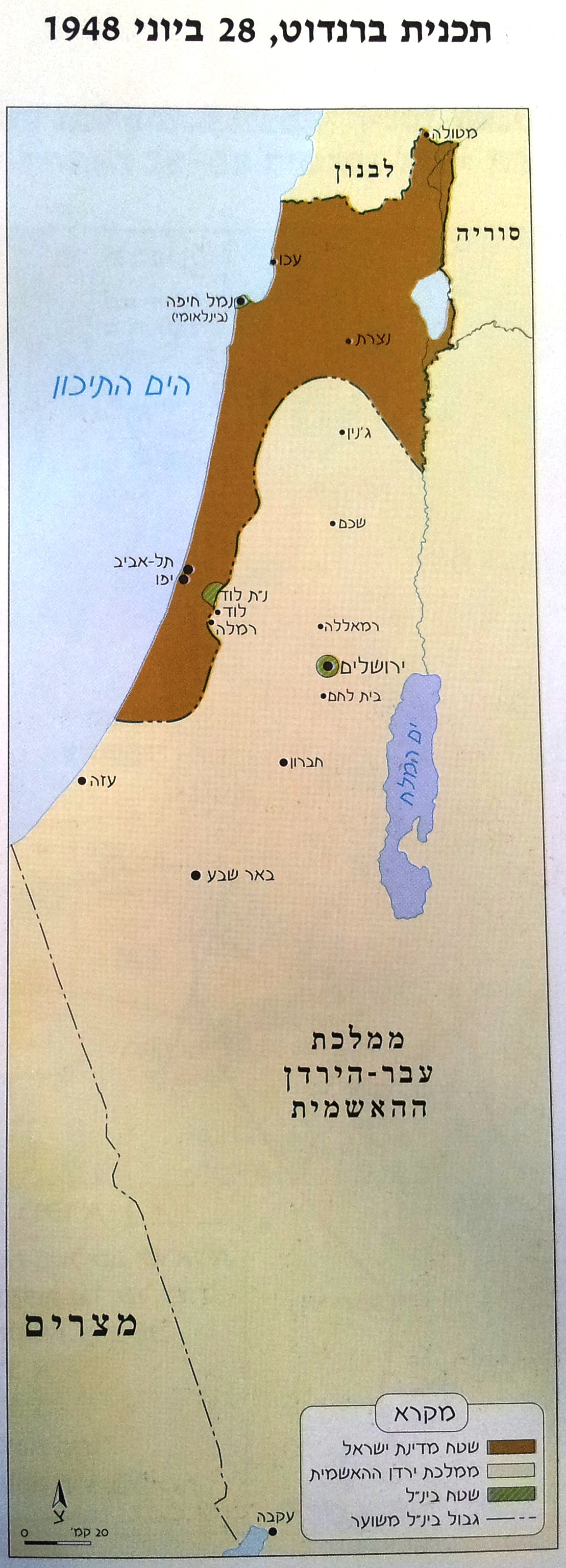
In yellow - Arab states. In brown - Jewish state. In green - international area.

On 28 June 1948, Bernadotte submitted his first formal proposal in secret to the various parties. He presented the following suggestions to discuss:

- Palestine and Transjordan be reformed as "a Union, comprising two Members, one Arab and one Jewish", each member with full control over its own affairs, including its foreign relations
- Economic union
- Fix boundaries by negotiation
- Immigration within its own borders should be within the competence of each member for a period of two years, after which the immigration policy of either member may be overruled by a "Council of the Union" or by the United Nations
- Full protection of religious and minority rights
- Guarantees for Holy Places, religious buildings and sites
- Return of residents, displaced by the conflict

As far as the boundaries of the two Members were concerned, Bernadotte proposed the following for consideration:

1. Inclusion of the whole or part of the Negev in Arab territory
2. Inclusion of the whole or part of Western Galilee in the Jewish territory
3. Inclusion of the City of Jerusalem in Arab territory, with municipal autonomy for the Jewish community and special arrangements for the protection of the Holy Places
4. Consideration of the status of Jaffa
5. Establishment of a free port at Haifa, the area of the free port to include the refineries and terminals
6. Establishment of a free airport at Lydda

Historian Elad Ben-Dror asserts that the person who was really responsible for the first Bernadotte Plan was Bernadotte's deputy, Ralph Bunche. Bunche made a major effort to imbue it with his own thinking about the appropriate political solution. He was influenced by the ideas of Judah Magnes and incorporated them into the plan, chiefly in its basic scheme, which called for a confederation in Palestine rather than a Jewish state and an Arab state.

== Second proposal ==
After the unsuccessful first proposal, Bernadotte continued with a more complex proposal that abandoned the idea of a union and proposed two independent states. This proposal was completed on 16 September 1948, and had as its basis seven "basic premises" (verbatim):

1. Peace must return to Palestine and every feasible measure should be taken to ensure that hostilities will not be resumed and that harmonious relations between Arab and Jew will ultimately be restored.
2. A Jewish State called Israel exists in Palestine and there are no sound reasons for assuming that it will not continue to do so.
3. The boundaries of this new State must finally be fixed either by formal agreement between the parties concerned or failing that, by the United Nations.
4. Adherence to the principle of geographical homogeneity and integration, which should be the major objective of the boundary arrangements, should apply equally to Arab and Jewish territories, whose frontiers should not therefore, be rigidly controlled by the territorial arrangements envisaged in the resolution of 29 November.
5. The right of innocent people, uprooted from their homes by the present terror and ravages of war, to return to their homes, should be affirmed and made effective, with assurance of adequate compensation for the property of those who may choose not to return.
6. The City of Jerusalem, because of its religious and international significance and the complexity of interests involved, should be accorded special and separate treatment.
7. International responsibility should be expressed where desirable and necessary in the form of international guarantees, as a means of allaying existing fears, and particularly with regard to boundaries and human rights.

The proposal then made specific suggestions that included (extracts):

1. The existing indefinite truce should be superseded by a formal peace, or at the minimum, an armistice.
2. The frontiers between the Arab and Jewish territories, in the absence of agreement between Arabs and Jews, should be established by the United Nations.
3. The Negev should be defined as Arab territory.
4. The frontier should run from Al-Faluja north northeast to Ramla and Lydda (both of which places would be in Arab territory).
5. Galilee should be defined as Jewish territory.
6. Haifa should be declared a free port, and Lydda airport should be declared a free airport.
7. The City of Jerusalem, which should be understood as covering the area defined in the resolution of the General Assembly of 29 November, should be treated separately and should be placed under effective United Nations control with maximum feasible local autonomy for its Arab and Jewish communities with full safeguards for the protection of the Holy Places and sites and free access to them and for religious freedom.
8. The United Nations should establish a Palestine conciliation commission.
9. The right of the Arab refugees to return to their homes in Jewish-controlled territory at the earliest possible date should be affirmed by the United Nations, and their repatriation, resettlement and economic and social rehabilitation, and payment of adequate compensation for the property of those choosing not to return, should be supervised and assisted by the United Nations conciliation commission.

With respect to the refugee issue, Bernadotte said,

It is ... undeniable that no settlement can be just and complete if recognition is not accorded to the right of the Arab refugee to return to the home from which he has been dislodged by the hazards and strategy of the armed conflict between Arabs and Jews in Palestine. The majority of these refugees have come from territory which ... was to be included in the Jewish State. The exodus of Palestinian Arabs resulted from panic created by fighting in their communities, by rumours concerning real or alleged acts of terrorism, or expulsion. It would be an offence against the principles of elemental justice if these innocent victims of the conflict were denied the right to return to their homes while Jewish immigrants flow into Palestine, and, indeed, at least offer the threat of permanent replacement of the Arab refugees who have been rooted in the land for centuries.

Bernadotte's second proposal was prepared in consultation with British and American emissaries. The degree to which they influenced the proposal is poorly known, since the meetings were kept strictly secret and all documents were destroyed, but Bernadotte apparently "found that the U.S.-U.K., proposals were very much in accord with his own views" and the two emissaries expressed the same opinion. The secret meetings were publicly exposed in October, only nine days before the U.S. presidential elections, causing U.S. President Harry S. Truman great embarrassment. Truman reacted by making a strongly pro-Zionist declaration, which contributed to the defeat of the Bernadotte plan in the UN during the next two months. Also contributing was the failure of the cease-fire and continuation of the fighting.

== Bibliography ==
- Ben-Dror, Elad (2015). Ralph Bunche and the Arab-Israeli Conflict: Mediation and the UN 1947–1949, Routledge. ISBN 978-1-138-78988-3.
- Ben-Dror, Elad (2023). UNSCOP and the Arab–Israeli conflict: the road to partition, Routledge. ISBN 978-1-03-205963-1.
- Amitzur Ilan (18 June 1989). Bernadotte in Palestine. Palgrave Macmillan UK. ISBN 978-1-349-10427-7.

== See also ==
- United Nations Truce Supervision Organization
