= Bernadette =

- Gender: female

Origin
- Origin: French, West Germanic
- Region of origin: medieval Europe

Other names
- Alternative spelling: Bernadett
- Related names: Bernadetta, Bernie, Barnard, Bernardas, Bearnárd, Bernardo, Beñat, Bernhard, Bernhardt, Bernd, Berend

Bernadette is a French name, a female form of the name Bernard, which means "brave bear". Bernadett is the Hungarian spelling.

Notable persons with the name include:

== People ==
=== Bernadette ===
- Bernadette (singer) (born 1959), Dutch singer
- Bernadette Allen (born 1956), American foreign service officer and ambassador
- Bernadette Banner (born 1994/1995), American-English dress historian and YouTuber
- Bernadette Barbers (born 1970), Filipino entrepreneur and politician
- Bernadette Beauvais (born 1949), French politician
- Bernadette Beck (born 1994), English actress, entrepreneur, philanthropist and stunt woman
- Bernadette Black, Australian author, social entrepreneur, and advocate
- Bernadette Bowyer (born 1966), Canadian field hockey player
- Bernadette Brunhart (born 1945), journalist, politician and suffragist from Liechtenstein
- Bernadette Carroll (1944–2018), American singer, member of the Angels in the 1960s
- Bernadette Castro (born 1944), American businesswoman
- Bernadette Cattanéo (1899–1963), French trade unionist and militant communist
- Bernadette Caulfield, American television producer
- Bernadette Charleux, French polymer chemist
- Bernadette Chirac (1933–2026), French politician, wife of former French President Jacques Chirac
- Bernadette Clement, Canadian politician
- Bernadette Collins, British strategy engineer from Northern Ireland
- Bernadette Cooper, American singer
- Bernadette Coston (born 1989), South African field hockey player
- Bernadette Després (1941–2024), French illustrator and comic book artist
- Bernadette Drummond, New Zealand professor of dentistry
- Bernadette Dupont (born 1936), French politician
- Bernadette Eberlein (born 1964), German dermatologist, allergologist, and researcher
- Bernadette Farrell (born 1957), British hymnographer and composer
- Bernadette Geieregger (born 1992), Austrian politician
- Bernadette Graf (born 1992), Austrian judoka
- Bernadette Hall (born 1948), New Zealand playwright and poet
- Bernadette Kelly (born 1964), British civil servant
- Bernadette Lafont (1938–2013), French actress
- Bernadette Luciano, New Zealand language and culture academic
- Bernadette Mayer (1945–2022), American poet, writer, and visual artist
- Bernadette Maynard (1907–2000), American politician
- Bernadette McDonald (born 1951), Canadian author
- Bernadette Devlin McAliskey (born 1947), Irish political activist
- Bernadette Meehan (born 1975), American diplomat and nonprofit organization executive
- Bernadette Menu (1938–2023), French Egyptologist
- Bernadette Meyler, American law academic
- Bernadette Moriau, French nun whose recovery from a spinal problem was declared a miracle
- Bernadette Nambi, also known as Bernadette Nambi Karuhanga, Ugandan educationist and researcher
- Bernadette Nolan (1960–2013), Irish singer and actress
- Bernadette O'Farrell (1924–1999), Irish actress
- Bernadette Pajer, American author
- Bernadette Peters (born 1948), American actress and singer
- Bernadette Quigley (born 1960), American actress
- Bernadette Romulo-Puyat (born 1971), Filipino government official
- Bernadette Roberts (1931–2017), American nun
- Bernadette Sanou Dao (born 1952), Burkinabé author and politician
- Bernadette Sands McKevitt (born 1958), Irish politician
- Bernadette Sanchez (born 1953), American politician
- Bernadette Schild (born 1990), Austrian ski racer
- Bernadette Seacrest, American vocalist
- Bernadette Sembrano (born 1976), Filipino television reporter, newscaster, and host
- Bernadette Smith, Canadian politician
- Bernadette Strachan (born 1962), English author
- Bernadette Soubirous (1844–1879), also known as Saint Bernadette of Lourdes, French Marian visionary
- Bernadette Speach (born 1948), American composer and pianist
- Bernadette Stanislaus (born 1954), American actress and writer known as Bernadette Stanis and Bern Nadette Stanis
- Bernadette Szőcs (born 1995), Romanian table tennis player
- Bernadette Tynan (1966–2017), British author and television presenter
- Bernadette Van Roy (born 1948), Belgian middle-distance runner
- Bernadette Wallis, Australian religious sister and author

=== Bernadett ===
- Bernadett Határ
- Bernadett Szél
- Bernadett Zágor
- Bernadett Nagy
- Bernadett Biacsi
- Bernadett Horváth
- Bernadett Balázs
- Bernadett Szabó
- Bernadett Temes
- Bernadett Bódi
- Bernadett Budai
- Bernadett Pepito
- Bernadett Kőszegi
- Bernadett Heidum
- Bernadett Németh
- Bernadett Dira
- Bernadett Baczkó
- Bernadett Ferling
- Bernadett Bakos
- Bernadett Kőszegi

== Film ==
- Bernadette (film), 2023 biography-comedy with Catherine Deneuve as the wife of French President Chirac

== Fictional characters ==
- Bernadette Fox, the titular character in the novel Where'd You Go, Bernadette and its film adaptation
- Bernadette Rostenkowski, on the American television series The Big Bang Theory
- Bernadette Taylor, in the British television series EastEnders

== Music ==
- "Bernadette", a single by The Four Tops from the album Reach Out (1967)
- "Bernadette", a single by IAMX from the album Volatile Times (2011)

== See also ==
- Bernadotte (disambiguation)
- Bernadetta (disambiguation)
- Bernette, people with this name
