= Bernie (given name) =

- Pronunciation: Bɜːr-niː
- Gender: Unisex
- Language: English

Origin
- Languages: 1. West Germanic; 2. French; 3. English
- Origin: Diminutive form of Bernard and Bernadette
- Region of origin: Western Europe

Other names
- Variant forms: Berney; Berny; Berni
- Related names: Bernard, Bernardo, Bernardas, Bernice, Bernadette, Bernadetta, Bernadotte, Bernhard, Bernhardt, Bernd, Bernt, Bernardino, Bernardina, Bernardine, Bernardin, Bernadine

Bernie is a given name, most often a shortened form of Bernard and Bernadette.

Notable people with the given name include:

== People ==
- Bernie Agrons (1922–2015), American politician
- Bernie Allen (born 1939), American baseball player
- Bernie Anderson Jr., silent film music composer
- Bernie Babcock (1868–1962), American author
- Bernie Barrantes, Filipino drag performer
- Bernie Bickerstaff (born 1944), American former National Basketball Association head coach
- Bernie Collins (born 1986 or 1987), British strategy engineer from Northern Ireland
- Bernie Carbo (born 1947), American baseball player
- Bernie Casey (1939–2017), American actor, poet, and professional football player
- Bernie de Le Cuona, British entrepreneur
- Bernie Dieter (born 1986), German cabaret artist
- Bernie Dwyer (1943–2013), Irish journalist, filmmaker and political activist
- Bernie Ebbers (1941–2020), Canadian businessman, founder and former chief executive officer of WorldCom
- Bernie Ecclestone (born 1930), British sports entrepreneur
- Bernie Erickson (born 1944), American football player
- Bernie Fedderly, Canadian drag racing crew chief
- Bernie Federko (born 1956), Canadian hockey player
- Bernie Geoffrion (1931–2006), Canadian National Hockey League Hall-of-Fame player and coach
- Bernie Goetz (born 1947), American vigilante
- Bernie Jaye, British comics creator and editor
- Bernie Kopell (born 1933), American actor
- Bernie Kosar (born 1963), American former National Football League quarterback
- Bernie Lim (born 1994), American physician and community organiser
- Bernie Leahy (1908–1978), American football player
- Bernie Lewis (born 1945), Welsh former footballer
- Bernie Malone (born 1948), Irish politician
- Bernie Mac (1957–2008), American comedian, actor, and voice actor
- Bernie Madoff (1938–2021), American convicted scammer and businessman
- Bernie Mangiboyat, American musician and founder of the band The Fifth
- Bernie Murphy (1923–?), Irish hurler
- Bernie Murray (camogie) (born 1985), is a Northern Irish sportswoman
- Bernie Nolan (1960–2013), Irish actress and singer
- Bernie Opper (1915–2000), American basketball player
- Bernie O'Neill (bowls), is a Northern Irish international laws bowler
- Bernie O'Rourke, Irish linguist
- Bernie Palmer (1893–1989), Canadian photographer
- Bernie Parent (1945–2025), Canadian National Hockey League goaltender
- Bernie Portenski (1949—2017), New Zealand long-distance runner
- Bernie Perryman (born 1959), American politician
- Bernie Quinlan (born 1951), Australian footballer
- Bernie Ripoll (born 1966), Australian politician
- Bernie Haynes Robynson (1900–2001), American printmaker, illustrator
- Bernie Roth (1907—2004), American curler
- Bernie Sanders (born 1941), American senator and presidential candidate
- Bernie Sherlock, Musical artist
- Bernie Szőcs (born 1995), Romanian table tennis player
- Bernie Taupin (born 1950), longtime lyricist for Elton John
- Bernie Tiede (born 1958), American mortician and convicted murderer
- Bernie Wagenblast (born 1956), American journalist and voice-over artist
- Bernie Williams (born 1968), Puerto Rican former Major League Baseball player
- Bernie Willock, Canadian cyclist and businessman
- Bernie Wijesekara (1930–2014), Sri Lankan Sinhala sports journalist
- Bernie Wolfe (hockey) (born 1951), Canadian NHL hockey player
- Bernie Worrell (1944–2016), American keyboardist and composer

== Fictional characters ==
- Bernie (Doonesbury), a comic strip character
- Bernie Abrahms, on the soap opera General Hospital
- Bernie Kropp, a minor character in the 2004 Pixar film The Incredibles
- Bernie White, a character in the 2016–2017 Millarworld comic book series Reborn
