= Bernadette Nambi =

Ugandan educator and researcher

Bernadette Nambi Karuhanga
- Born: Bernadette Nambi
- Citizenship: Uganda
- Occupation: Educationist
- Employer: Uganda
- Organization: National Curriculum Development Centre
- Known for: Curriculum development
- Notable work: Challenges impacting performance management implementation in public universities publication
- Title: Director

Bernadette Nambi, also known as Bernadette Nambi Karuhanga, is a Ugandan educationist, researcher. She is the acting director of the National Curriculum Development Centre.

== Career ==
Nambi was on the central ad hoc regularities and malpractices (alteration of marks) committee of Makerere University which probed into the examination malpractice in 2014. She is an external examiner for Masters and PhD students at the Nelson Mandela Metropolitan University (South Africa), North Western University (South Africa) and Nkumba University (Uganda). She has an experience of over 20 years in curriculum design and development across all levels of education. She has supervised over 100 university students in research, and is a reviewer for the African Journal of Economic and Management Studies.

She was among the 19 candidates shortlisted by the Public Service Commission for the role of Deputy Executive Director at the Kampala Capital City Authority, which was won by Benon Moses Kigenyi.

== Publications ==
- Challenges impacting performance management implementation in public universities.
- Evaluating implementation of strategic performance management practices in universities in Uganda.
- A Performance Management Model for Universities in Uganda.

== See also ==
- Dorothy Kisaka
- Joy Kwesiga
- Sharifah Buzeki
