= Bernardine =

- Pronunciation: BUR-na-deen
- Gender: Female or male

Origin
- Meaning: "Strong" or "Brave" as a bear
- Region of origin: Latin/Italian, as Bernadino

Other names
- Related names: Bernard, Bernadine, Bernie, Bernardina

Bernardine is a Latinate diminutive of the given name "Bernard". It can be applied to men, notably Saint Bernadine, but is now much more often a female name. Bernadine and Bernadene are variant spellings of the female name.

The nickname Bernie is unisex. Bernardine is uncommon as a surname. Emily Dickinson uses the word as an adjective: "A more Bernardine Girl...".

== Women ==
- Bernardine of Lippe (1563–1628), German countess
- Bernardine Bishop (1939–2013), British author
- Bernardine Dohrn (born 1942), American activist and law professor
- Bernardine do Régo (born 1937), Beninese diplomat
- Bernardine Evaristo (born 1959), British author and academic
- Bernardine Flynn (1904–1977), American radio actress and announcer
- Bernardine Hamaekers (1836–1912), Belgian soprano
- Bernardine R. Leist (1880–1926), American screenwriter and actress
- Bernardine Portenski (1949–2017), New Zealand long-distance runner

== Men ==
- Saint Bernardino of Siena (1380–1444), Italian Franciscan missionary
- Bernardino of Fossa (1420–1503), Italian Fransciscan historian, theologian and writer
- Blessed Bernardine of Feltre (1439–1494), Italian Franciscan missionary
- Bernardine a Piconio (1633–1709), French Capuchin theologian and exegete
- Bernardine Dong Guangqing (1917–2007), Chinese bishop

== See also ==
- Bernardines (disambiguation)
- Bernardino (disambiguation)
- Bernardin
- Bernadine
- Bernardini (disambiguation)
- Bernardina
