= Wijesekara =

Wijesekara is a surname. Notable people with the surname include:

- Bernie Wijesekara (1930–2014), Sri Lankan journalist
- Jayantha Wijesekara, Sri Lankan politician
- Lakshman Wijesekara (1948–2021), Sri Lankan singer
- Mahinda Wijesekara (1942–2026), Sri Lankan politician
- Piyumi Wijesekara, American-Sri Lankan scientist
