= Rego (surname) =

Rego or Rêgo is a Portuguese surname that may refer to the following notable people:

- Alfredo Rego (skier) (born 1946), Guatemalan alpine skier
- Ana Cristina Rego, Portuguese neurologist.
- Bernardine do Régo (born 1937), Beninese diplomat
- Elisa Rego, Brazilian singer, songwriter and radio host
- Emanuel Rego (born 1973), Brazilian beach volleyball player
- George De Cairos Rego (1858–1946), Australian composer of classical music
- Gilbert Blaize Rego (1921–2012), Indian Prelate of the Roman Catholic Church
- Gilberto de Almeida Rêgo (1895–1970), Brazilian football referee
- Hedwig Rego (born 1937), Anglo-Indian teacher, social activist and politician
- João Rego (born 2005), Portuguese football midfielder
- Joaquim Rufino do Rêgo (1926–2013), Brazilian Roman Catholic bishop
- José Lins do Rego (1901–1957), Brazilian writer
- Joseph Rego-Costa (1919–2002), American soccer right halfback
- Leonel Rêgo, Portuguese rower
- Lucas Rego, or Lookas, American record producer
- Luis Rego (born 1943), Portuguese actor and writer
- Luís do Rego Barreto (1777–1840), Portuguese brigadier in the Peninsular War
- Néstor Rego (born 1962), Galician politician
- Paula Rego (1935–2022), Portuguese painter
- Rodrigo Rêgo (born 2002), Portuguese football defender
- Rogério da Silva Rego (1933–1982), Brazilian lawyer, public servant and politician
- Rui Rêgo (born 1980), Portuguese football goalkeeper
- Sira Rego (born 1973), Spanish politician
- Tereza Costa Rêgo (1929–2020), Brazilian painter
- Tony Rego (1897–1978), American Major League Baseball catcher
- Vasco do Rego (1925–2021), Indian Jesuit priest
- Veneziano Vital do Rêgo (born 1970), Brazilian lawyer and a federal senator
- Vicente do Rego Monteiro (1899–1970), Brazilian painter

== See also ==
- Regős
