= Sarah Broom (disambiguation) =

Sarah Broom (1972-2013), was a New Zealand poet

Sarah Broom may also refer to:

- Sarah M. Broom, American writer and memoirist
- Sarah Broom Macnaughtan (1864-1916), Scottish novelist
- Sarah Broom Poetry Prize, named after Sarah Broom New Zealand poet
