= Bernie Murray =

Bernie Murray may refer to:

- Bernie Murray (camogie)
- Bernie Murray (Gaelic footballer)
