= Laura Solomon =

New Zealand novelist, playwright and poet (1974–2019)

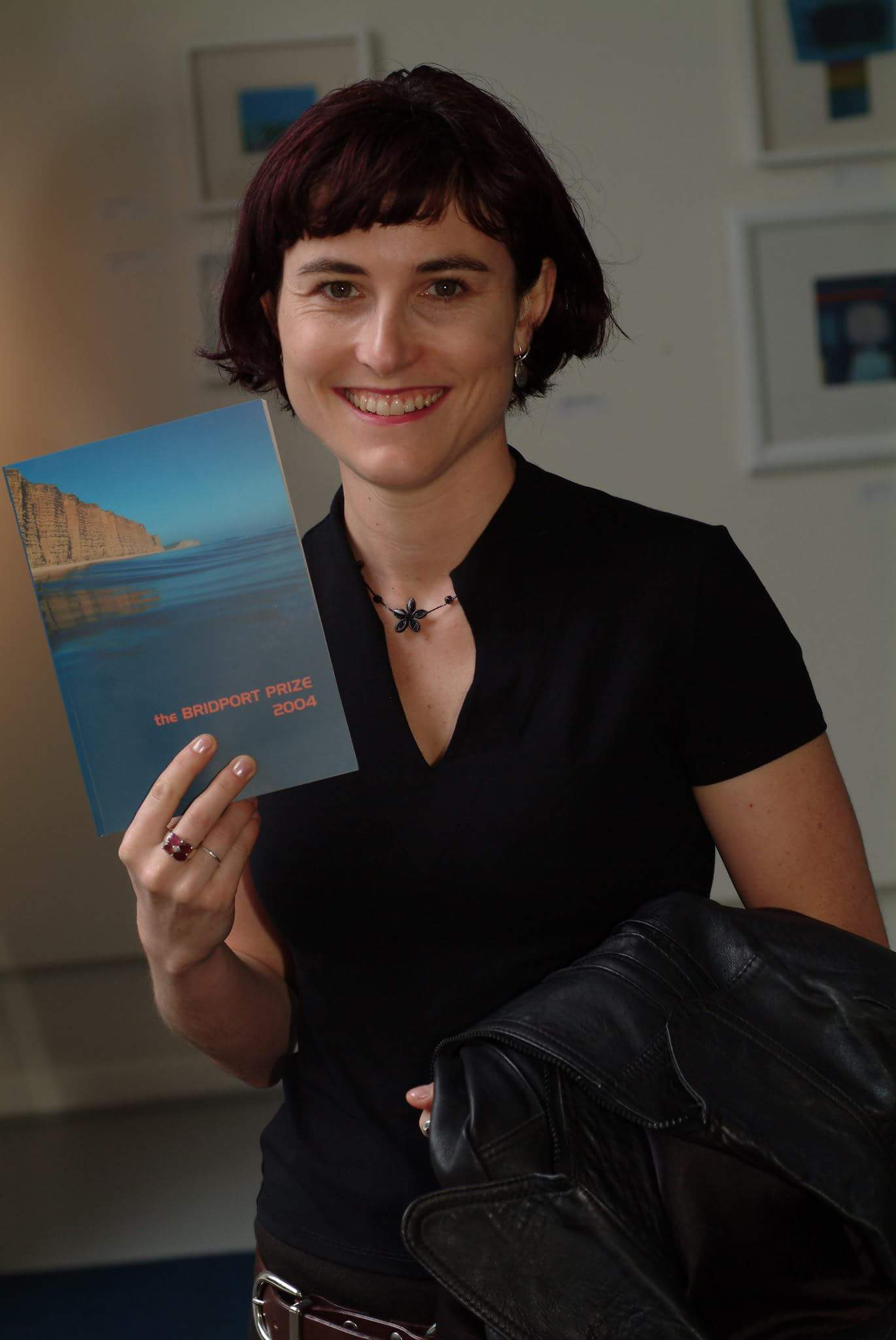
- Solomon in London in 2004
- Born: Laura Jane Solomon; 28 June 1974; Auckland, New Zealand
- Died: 18 February 2019 (aged 44)
- Occupations: Short-story writer, novelist, poet, playwright
- Writing career
- Notable works: Alternative Medicine; Instant Messages; Black Light; Nothing Lasting; An Imitation of Life; Taking Wainui; In Vitro
- Notable awards: Bridport Prize; 2004; Bridport Prize; 2005; Proverse Prize; 2009
- Website: www.laurasolomon.co.nz

Laura Jane Solomon (28 June 1974 – 18 February 2019) was a New Zealand novelist, playwright and poet. She emerged as part of a new wave of young New Zealand writers in the 1990s anthologised in Mark Pirie's New Zealand Writing: The NeXt Wave (1998). Her first two novels were published around this time, while Solomon was in her early 20s, and she subsequently moved abroad to London where she wrote further works and trained as an IT professional. In 2007 she returned to New Zealand due to ongoing health problems, but continued to write and publish prolifically until her death. Solomon is best-known as a novelist, but her poetry and short stories have also been widely published and short-listed for awards and prizes.

== Early life and career ==
Solomon was born in Auckland on 28 June 1974. Her mother was a special education teacher and her father was an electrical engineer. She grew up in various parts of New Zealand, including Raetihi and Nelson. She graduated from Nayland College, Nelson, in 1991. She began writing novels as a 13-year-old.

Solomon attended the University of Otago in Dunedin where she graduated with a Bachelor of Arts degree in 1995 and wrote her first novel Black Light. In 1996 she moved to Wellington to complete an honours degree in English at Victoria University of Wellington. In Wellington she wrote her second novel Nothing Lasting and the play Dummy Bride, which was produced at the Wellington Fringe Festival in 1996. At the age of 21, Solomon's first two novels — Black Light (1996) and Nothing Lasting (1997) — were accepted by Auckland publisher Tandem Press.

== Later career ==
After graduating from Victoria, Solomon left New Zealand and lived abroad in London, where she wrote her third novel An Imitation of Life and the collection of short stories Alternative Medicine. Jessica Le Bas for the Nelson Mail described Alternative Medicine as "a bright fanfare of quirky vignettes that let us know [Solomon's] back". In 2003 she completed an MSc in computer science at Birkbeck College at the University of London. Thereafter she worked in IT and travelled around the world, including to Norway where she worked for Fast Search & Transfer ASA. Her play Sprout was produced at the Edinburgh Fringe Festival in 2005.

In 2007, having begun to suffer health problems, she returned to New Zealand to live in Nelson where she continued to write full-time. Her fiction was published overseas and her poetry was widely published in New Zealand and internationally in magazines and online sites. She won prizes in Bridport, Edwin Morgan, Ware Poets, Willesden Herald, Mere Literary Festival, and Essex Poetry Festival competitions. In 2009, her novella, Instant Messages, won the inaugural international Proverse Prize for Fiction in Hong Kong, and was short-listed for the Virginia Prize in the UK. In 2011, her debut collection of poetry In Vitro was published.

She later published additional novels Hilary and David (2011), Vera Magpie (2013), University Days (2014, a sequel to Instant Messages), and a short story collection, The Shingle Bar Sea Monster and Other Stories (2012). A revised edition of An Imitation of Life was published by Proverse in 2013. The second edition of In Vitro and a further collection of Solomon’s poetry, Frida Kahlo’s Cry and Other Poems were also published by Proverse (2014 and 2015 respectively). A play, Brain Graft, was published by Proverse in 2017. Solomon was a judge for the Sentinel Quarterly Short Story Competition in the UK. Her final poetry collection, Awakening, was published in 2018.

== Death and legacy ==
Solomon died on 18 February 2019. Her publishers at Proverse said of her that she was "a bright, perceptive, witty writer, with a keen ear for dialogue and a wry and objective vision of modern life".

The NZSA Laura Solomon Cuba Press Prize was established in her memory and is awarded annually by the New Zealand Society of Authors to new writing with a "unique and original vision".

== Selected works ==
=== Fiction ===
- Black Light (North Shore City, N.Z.: Tandem Press, 1996)
- Nothing Lasting (North Shore City, N.Z.: Tandem Press, 1997)
- Alternative Medicine (short stories) (UK: Flame Books, 2008)
- An Imitation of Life (UK: Solidus, 2010)
- Instant Messages (Hong Kong: Proverse Publishing, 2010)
- Hilary and David (Hong Kong: Proverse Publishing, 2011)
- The Shingle Bar Sea Monster and Other Stories (Hong Kong: Proverse Publishing, 2012)
- An Imitation of Life, 2nd revsd ed. (Hong Kong: Proverse Publishing, 2013)
- Vera Magpie (Hong Kong: Proverse Publishing, 2013)
- University Days (Hong Kong: Proverse Publishing, 2014)
- Taking Wainui (short stories) (India: Woven Words Publishers, 2017)
- Marsha's Deal (Finland: Creativia, 2017)
- Tales of Love and Disability (short stories) (India: Woven Words Publishers, 2018)
- Hell's Unveiling (India: Woven Words Publishers, 2018)

=== Poetry ===
- In Vitro (Wellington: HeadworX Publishers, 2011)
- In Vitro (Hong Kong: Proverse Publishing, 2014, 2nd edition)
- Frida Kahlo’s Cry and Other Poems (Hong Kong: Proverse Publishing, 2015)
- Awakening (New York: Adelaide Books, 2018)

=== Drama ===
- Brain Graft (Hong Kong: Proverse Publishing, 2017)
