= Meyler =

Meyler is a surname. Notable people with the surname include:

- Bernadette Meyler, American legal scholar
- David Meyler (born 1989), Irish footballer
- Fintan Meyler (1929–2005), Irish actress
- Hugh Meyler (1875–1929), British politician
- John Meyler (born 1956), Irish hurler and Gaelic footballer
- Trevor Meyler (born 2003), BWB Panther
