= Bernardine (disambiguation) =

Bernardine is a given name.

Bernardine may also refer to:

- Bernardine (play), a 1952 play by Mary Chase
- Bernardine (film), a 1957 film adaptation of the play
- "Bernardine" (song), a 1957 song performed by Pat Boone for the film
- Bernardine, another name for the Italian wine grape Prié blanc
- Bernardhine, or the Army of Weimar, a German Mercenary Army under Bernard of Saxe-Weimar in the service of the French

== See also ==
- Bernardines (disambiguation)
- Bernardino (disambiguation)
- Bernardin
- Bernadine
- Bernardini (disambiguation)
