= Rego =

Rego may refer to:

== Places ==
- Rego da Murta, Alvaiázere, Portugal
- Rego, Celorico de Basto, Celorico de Basto, Portugal
- Rego, Indiana, United States
- Rego Park, Queens, United States
- Rego Center, a shopping mall in New York City, U.S.

== Other uses ==
- Rego (surname)
- Regő Szánthó (born 2000), Hungarian football midfielder
- Rego, in vehicle registration plates of Australia, the registration number or fee of a motor vehicle in Australia
- "R.E.G.O.", a 2021 song by Ruby Fields
