= Rogério da Silva Rego =

Brazilian politician (1933–1982)

Rogério Rego
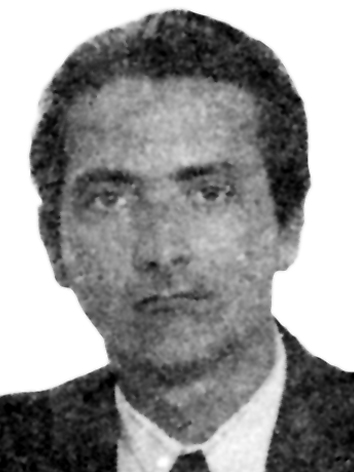
- Rogerio Rego

Federal Deputy for Bahia

Personal details
- Born: December 21, 1933 Salvador, Bahia
- Died: October 1, 1982 (age 48) Itapetinga, Bahia
- Party: ARENA, PDS
- Spouse: Célia Diniz Gonçalves Rego
- Education: Federal University of Bahia
- Profession: lawyer, public servant

Rogério da Silva Rego (December 21, 1933, in Salvador, Bahia – October 1, 1982, in Itapetinga, Bahia) was a Brazilian lawyer, public servant and politician, formerly a federal deputy for Bahia.

== Biography ==
Born in the state of Bahia, Brazil, Rogério was the son of José Raimundo Fortes do Rego and Elisa da Silva Fortes do Rego. A Lawyer graduated in 1959 from the Federal University of Bahia, he had political connections with Juracy Magalhães, of whom he was a cabinet officer in his second stint as governor of Bahia between 1959 and 1963, (Note: Juracy Magalhães was head of the state government between 1931 and 1937, when he left power in protest against the Estado Novo.) in addition to occupying the positions of legal assistant at the state attorney general's office and the city hall of Salvador, now administered by Heitor Dias. He was subsequently director of the State Cooperative Department and attorney of the Institute of Retirement and Pensions of the Servants of the State of Bahia.

In 1967 he resumed the function of Jutahy Magalhães's cabinet officer when the latter became vice-governor when he won the 1966 elections with Luís Viana Filho. That same year he spent time in the United States where he attended seminars on cooperativism at the University of Wisconsin, communication at the University of Michigan, and about the Washington International Center program, experience that earned him the publication of Development of the cooperative system in Brazil in collaboration with José de Siqueira Rodrigues Filho.

Member of ARENA after the granting of bipartisanship by the Military Regime of 1964, he was elected federal deputy for Bahia in 1970, 1974 and 1978. During his parliamentary life he was part of the so-called "renovating group" of his party, connecting with the figure of Filinto Müller and, with his death, Petrônio Portela. With the restoration of pluripartisanship, he migrated to the PDS in 1980 and was a candidate for vice governor of Bahia in the Clériston Andrade slate in 1982, but both died during the election campaign in an air accident that killed 11 more people in Itapetinga on October 1, 1982. (Note: Victims of an air accident in Itapetinga on October 1, 1982, Henrique Brito and Rogério Rego died, reasons for which Vasco Neto and Edvaldo Flores were hired. Shortly before Heitor Dias refused the mandate because he was an advisor to the Court of Auditors of Bahia while Romeu de Queiroz Filho did not assume the mandate that would fit him.)

Due to the unfortunate event, the state directorate of the PDS appointed João Durval Carneiro and Edvaldo Flores as new candidates for governor and vice-governor, respectively, and this slate won the election on November 15 of that year.
