= Sarah Broom =

New Zealand poet

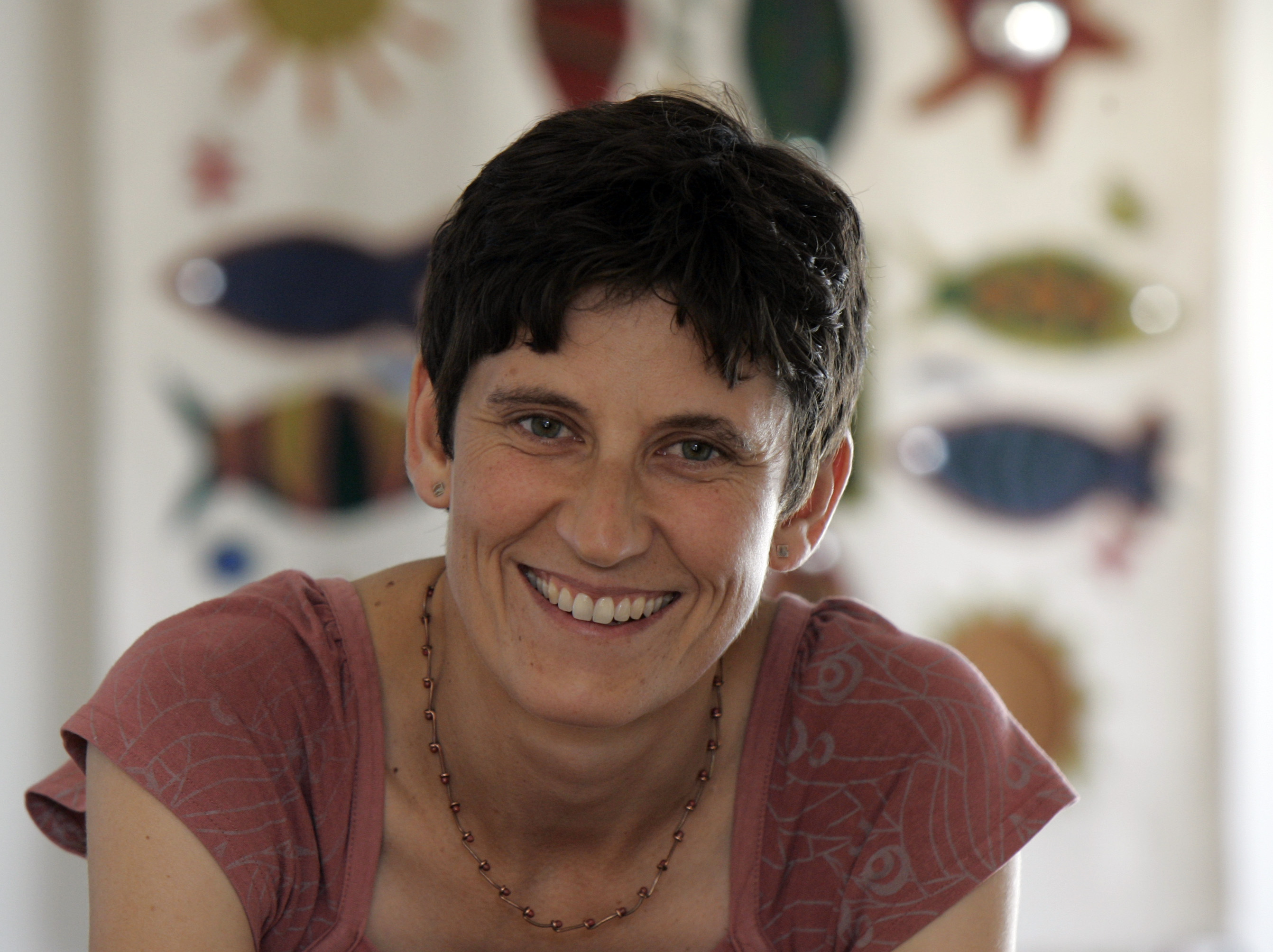
- Born: 1972; Dunedin
- Died: 2013 (aged 40–41)
- Occupation: Poet

Sarah Broom (1972–2013) was a New Zealand poet and university lecturer. Her work included two books of poetry, Tigers at Awhitu (published jointly in England and New Zealand) and Gleam. After her early death from lung cancer, the Sarah Broom Poetry Prize, was established to remember and celebrate her life and work.

== Biography ==
Sarah Kathryn Broom was born in 1972 in Dunedin. She grew up in Christchurch and graduated with a Bachelor of Arts in English and psychology from the University of Canterbury. She then completed an MA in English Literature at Leeds and DPhil at Oxford University, studying contemporary British and Irish poetry. She lectured at Somerville College, Oxford.

In 1999, in Oxford, she married Michael Gleissner whom she had first met on a Lions Club scholarship to Japan. They returned to New Zealand in 2000. She took up a post-doctoral fellowship at Massey University in Albany and then lectured in English at the University of Otago. She and her family later lived in Glendowie, Auckland.

Her poetry was published both in New Zealand, in journals such as Bravado, Landfall, Poetry New Zealand and Takahe, and in England in Acumen, Metre, Orbis and Oxford Magazine.

She was diagnosed with stage-four lung cancer in February 2008, while pregnant with her third child. Her daughter was born safely at 30 weeks gestation soon after the diagnosis.

Tigers at Awhitu which dwelt on themes of relationships, illness and motherhood was published simultaneously in England and New Zealand in 2010. The book was accepted on the strength of its first section, and the poems in the second section of the book were all written after her cancer diagnosis.

She continued to write poetry throughout her treatment over the next few years, which involved participation in experimental drug trials in Australia.

Sarah Broom was married and had three children. She died on 18 April 2013.

== Awards and prizes ==
After her death, and at the posthumous launch of her poetry collection Gleam, the Sarah Broom Poetry Prize was announced. This prize was established by her husband and friends to celebrate poetry in New Zealand and to encourage and support the recipient to complete a manuscript of poems.

The judging panel for the first award included Paula Green, Sarah Ross, Jennifer Crawford, Pat Palmer and Michael Gleissner. The guest judge, poet Sam Hunt, awarded the inaugural prize to winner C.K. Stead on 17 May 2014 at the Auckland Writers & Readers Festival.

== Bibliography ==
- Contemporary British and Irish Poetry: an introduction (Palgrave Macmillan, 2006)
- Tigers at Awhitu (Carcanet Press and Auckland University Press, 2010)
- Gleam (Auckland University Press, 2013)

== See also ==
- List of New Zealand literary awards
- Sarah Broom Poetry Prize
