= The Sapling =

New Zealand children's literature online magazine

The Sapling is a New Zealand online children's literature magazine. The website has reviews, interviews and articles on books for children and young adults. The website was founded by Sarah Forster and Jane Arthur in 2017. The Sapling won the Special Industry Award at the NZ Book Trade Industry Awards in 2018.
