= Berney =

Berney is a surname and given name. Notable people with the surname and given name include:

Surname:

- Berney (surname)
- Berney baronets

Given name:

- Berney Brograve (1726–1797), English baronet
- Berney Caldwell (1805–1873), English cricketer

== See also ==
- Berner
- Berny
- Berni (disambiguation)
- Bernie (given name)
