= Michael Hight =

New Zealand artist (born 1961)

- Born: 1961 (age 64–65); Stratford, New Zealand
- Education: University of Waikato
- Occupation: Artist and illustrator
- Spouse: Paula Green

Michael Hight (born 1961) is a New Zealand artist and illustrator.

== Background ==
Hight was born in Stratford, New Zealand in 1961. He graduated with a B.Soc.Sc from the University of Waikato in 1982. Between 1984 and 1987 he traveled, then lived and painted in London. He is a self-taught artist and has been painting since the age of 14.

Hight is the partner of New Zealand poet and children's writer Paula Green and has provided illustrations for several of her children's books.

== Career ==
Hight has been a regular exhibitor since 1984 and has been a full-time artist since 2001. Hight rose to prominence in the 1990s with a series of profound exhibitions, including Heartland Trinkets (1992–93), In Trust (1995), Seven Rivers (1995), Four Strong Winds (1996) and Maungakakaramea (1998). In 2002, his Auckland exhibition Omarama/Place of Light sold out prior to the opening.

Hight's work is held in many New Zealand collections, and he has been the recipient of several QEII grants.

Many of Hight's works are of one of two types − realistic portrayals of countryside, often dominated by beehives, or linear abstract works in wax and resin.
