= Bernardines =

Bernardines may refer to:

- Cistercians, a Roman Catholic religious order, sometimes called the Bernardines
- Bernardine Cistercians of Esquermes, a small branch of the Cistercians
- Bernardines (Franciscans), the name by which the Order of Friars Minor (Franciscan Observants) is known in the lands of the former Polish–Lithuanian Commonwealth, after Bernardino of Siena
- Bernardine Sisters of St. Francis, a Roman Catholic religious order based in Pennsylvania, United States
- The multi-ethnic mercenary army formerly commanded by German Protestant general Bernard of Saxe-Weimar during the Thirty Years' War, inherited by the French after his death

== See also ==
- Bernardine (disambiguation)
- Bernadine (disambiguation)
