= Regős =

Regős (Hungarian pronunciation: [ˈrɛɡøːʃ]) is a Hungarian surname that may refer to the following notable people:

- István Regős (born c. 1954), Hungarian painter and artist
- Márta Vastagh Regős (born 1981), Hungarian alpine skier
- Pál Regős (1926–2009), Hungarian pantomimist and choreographer

== See also ==
- Rego (surname)
