= Sharifah Buzeki =

Ugandan public practitioner and executive director

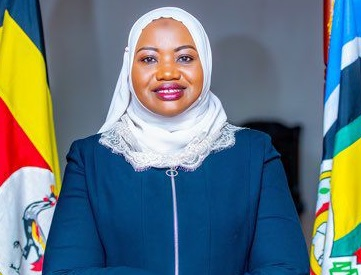

Executive Director of the Kampala Capital City Authority
- Incumbent
- Assumed office December 2024
- Appointed by: President Yoweri Museveni
- Deputy: Benon Kigenyi Moses
- Preceded by: Dorothy Kisaka

Personal details
- Born: Uganda
- Education: Islamic University in Uganda (B.A. Social Sciences); Master's in Public Administration and Management; Postgraduate Diploma in Human Resource Management
- Profession: Public administrator, human resource practitioner
- Known for: Leadership at KCCA

Sharifah Buzeki is a Ugandan public administrator and human resource practitioner. She is the Executive Director of the Kampala Capital City Authority (KCCA).

== Career ==
Sharifah Buzeki holds a Master’s Degree in Public Administration and Management, a Post Graduate Diploma in Human Management, a Bachelor’s Degree in Social Sciences obtained from Islamic University in Uganda. In addition, she has attended numerous skills enhancing courses and obtained certificates in Conflict Management, Leadership and Change Management, Monitoring and Evaluation, Training of Trainers and Facilitation Skills; among others.

She has over 13 years of experience in human resource management and public administration within local and central government settings. Before her appointment to KCCA, she served as the Commissioner for Human Resource Management in the Inspection Department of the Ministry of Public Service (MoPS).

=== KCCA ===
Her appointment, made by President Yoweri Museveni in December 2024, makes her the third woman to lead KCCA since its establishment. As Executive Director, she is responsible for overseeing the management and operations of Uganda’s capital city, ensuring efficient service and driving urban development initiatives.

Buzeki will be deputized by Benon Kigenyi Moses who was also appointed on the same date.

She replaced Dorothy Kisaka, who was fired as the KCCA Executive Director on 24 September 2024.
