= Jane Arthur (poet) =

Poet and writer from New Zealand

- Born: 1981 (age 44–45); New Plymouth, Taranaki, New Zealand
- Education: University of Auckland (MA); Whitireia Polytechnic (Dip. Publishing); International Institute of Modern Letters, Victoria University of Wellington (MA)
- Occupations: Poet, children's writer, editor, bookseller
- Writing career
- Language: English
- Genres: Poetry, children's fiction
- Notable works: Craven (2019); Calamities! (2023); Brown Bird (2024)
- Notable awards: Sarah Broom Poetry Prize (2018); Jessie Mackay Award for Best First Book of Poetry, Ockham New Zealand Book Awards (2020)

Jane Arthur (born 1981) is a New Zealand poet, children's writer and editor, and a former bookseller. She won the Sarah Broom Poetry Prize and Jessie Mackay Prize for Best First Book of Poetry.

== Background ==
Arthur was born in New Plymouth, New Zealand and currently lives in Wellington. She received her Masters in Creative Writing from International Institute of Modern Letters at Te Herenga Waka Victoria University of Wellington. She received her Diploma in Publishing from Whitireia Polytech and worked at the children's publisher, Gecko Press. Arthur then pursued an MA in English from the University of Auckland, specialized in poetry. In 2025, she began her PhD in Creative Writing through the IIML at Te Herenga Waka Victoria University of Wellington.

== Career ==
Arthur was awarded the Sarah Broom Poetry Prize in 2018, with guest judge Eileen Meyers saying of her work 'there's an unperturbed confident "real" here'. Her first poetry collection, Craven, was selected as one of the Top 10 Best New Zealand Poetry Collections of 2019 by The Spinoff and won the 2020 Jessie Mackay Prize for Best First Book of Poetry at the Ockham New Zealand Book Award. Her second poetry collection, Calamities!, was published in 2023.

In 2020 she received an Emerging Writers Residency from the Michael King Writers Centre and was named one of the University of Auckland’s “40 Under 40” inspiring alumni.

In 2024, her first novel for children, Brown Bird, was published by Penguin Random House New Zealand. Louise Ward said of Brown Bird, "This is a brave book about brave people in the modern world, reminiscent of Judy Blume and Jacqueline Wilson." It was shortlisted for the 2025 Wright Family Foundation Esther Glen Junior Fiction Award at the New Zealand Book Awards for Children and Young Adults.

Arthur has served as a judge for the New Zealand Book Awards for Children and Young Adults twice (in 2020 she was convenor of the judging panel) and as a judge for the poetry category for the 2022 Ockham New Zealand Book Awards.

Arthur, with Sarah Forster, is the co-founder of The Sapling, a children's literature website which won the 2018 Special Industry Award at the NZ Book Trade Industry Award.

In October 2020 Arthur and fellow author Catherine Robertson opened and managed the independent bookstore Good Books in Wellington. It was the only bookshop in New Zealand to be an accredited living wage employer and supported local schools with their Pay it Forward initiative. In 2024 they announced the store would close citing economic reasons.

Arthur is currently working on a novel for adults.

== Bibliography ==
=== Poetry ===
- Craven (Victoria University Press, 2019)
- Calamities! (Te Herenga Waka University Press, 2023)

=== Children's fiction ===
- Brown Bird (Puffin / Penguin Random House New Zealand, 2024)
