= Catarina Resende de Oliveira =

Portuguese neurologist and dementia researcher

- Born: February 1946 (age 80); Coimbra, Portugal
- Years active: 50
- Known for: Research into dementia and Parkinson's disease
- Awards: Grand Officer of the Order of Public Instruction

Catarina Resende de Oliveira (born 1946) is a Portuguese neurologist, researcher, university professor, and doctor. A full professor of biochemistry at the Faculty of Medicine of the University of Coimbra, she studies the processes that cause neurological degeneration responsible for illnesses such as Alzheimer's disease and Parkinson's disease.

== Training ==
Catarina Isabel Neno Resende de Oliveira was born in February 1946 in Coimbra, Portugal. Her father was professor of medicine at the University of Coimbra. She took a degree in medicine at the Faculty of Medicine of the University of Coimbra, completing the course in 1970. She then became an assistant at the Faculty. After completing a doctorate in neurology (psychiatry) in 1984, she joined the university's Centre for Neuroscience and Cell Biology, an organization of which she would be president between 2003 and 2014.

== Career ==
Oliveira became head of clinical neurology and head of the biochemistry course at the University of Coimbra in 1988. Her research has focussed on the molecular mechanisms of neurodegeneration and neuroprotection, emphasising the interaction between research and the clinical treatment of neurodegenerative diseases. She has coordinated several scientific projects, including on the mechanisms of brain ageing and dementia, and on the relationship between diabetes and neurodegenerative diseases. Most recently she led a research group dedicated to advanced diagnosis and identification of biomarkers of ageing and brain diseases, part of a European consortium working in this area. Oliveira is a consultant in neurology at the Neurological Clinic of the Centro Hospitalar e Universitário de Coimbra (Coimbra University Hospital - CHUC), a member of the Alzheimer Portugal scientific committee and president of the Portuguese Agency for Clinical Research and Biomedical Innovation (AICIB). She coordinates the consortium that brings together the Centre for Neuroscience and Cell Biology and the Instituto Biomédico de Investigação em Luz e Imagem (Biomedical Institute for Research in Light and Image - IBILI). In addition, she has supervised 19 PhD and 17 master's theses, including Ana Cristina Rego, with whom she frequently collaborates on journal articles.

Oliveira is a director of the Innovation and Development Unit of the CHUC. She was a member and later president of the Scientific Council for Life and Health Sciences of the Fundação para a Ciência e Tecnologia (Foundation for Science and Technology), which is the organization in Portugal that decides on funding allocation for research. She has been a reviewer for the Wellcome Trust, the Alzheimer's Association, Parkinson's UK, the Medical Research Council (MRC) and the European Research Council (ERC). She is member of the European Dana Alliance for the Brain (EDAB), and was sub-director of the Portugal/ Harvard Medical School Programme.

== Awards and honours ==
- In 1965, Catarina Resende de Oliveira was given the Dom Dinis prize, for being the best chemistry student at the University of Coimbra.
- In 2006, she received the Stimulus to Excellence award from the Foundation for Science and Technology.
- In 2008, Oliveira won the Nunes Correa Verdades de Faria prize, for her work in the area of ageing. The award was given by the Santa Casa da Misericórdia de Lisboa.
- In 2014, she was made a Grand Officer of the Order of Public Instruction, a Portuguese state award.
- In 2016, the Portuguese Ministry of Health awarded her a Distinguished Service Gold Medal.
