= Paula Green (poet) =

New Zealand poet and children's author

Paula Green MNZM
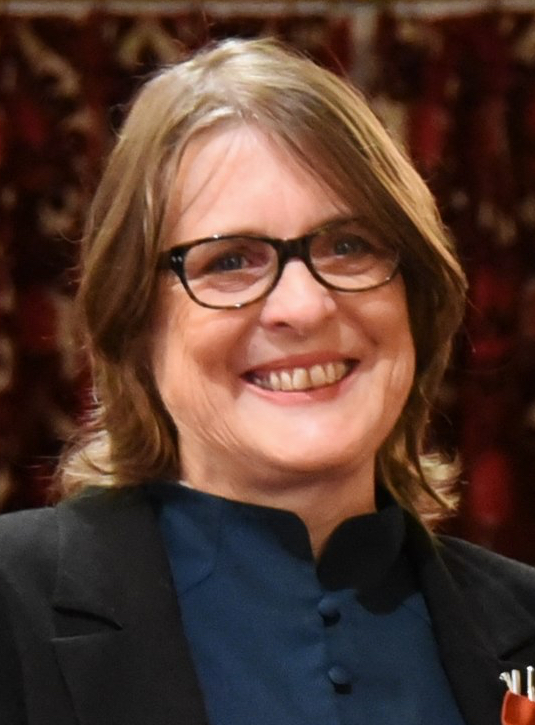
- Green in 2017
- Born: 1955 (age 70–71); Auckland, New Zealand
- Education: University of Auckland
- Spouse: Michael Hight
- Writing career
- Language: English
- Genre: Poetry
- Notable awards: Prime Minister's Awards for Literary Achievement; Children's Choice Non-Fiction Award (2015)
- Website: nzpoetryshelf.com/about

Paula Joy Green MNZM (born 1955) is a New Zealand poet and children's author.

== Background ==
Green was born in 1955, in Auckland. She attended the Kamo High School.

In 2005 Green received her PhD in Italian, supervised by Bernadette Luciano, and was Literary Fellow at the University of Auckland.

Green is married to the painter Michael Hight and currently lives in Auckland.

== Career ==
Green has published several collections of poetry including Cookhouse and The Track, with several in between.

She has also published books of poetry for children, illustrated by artists such as Jenny Cooper, Chris Grosz, Myles Lawford, and Sarah Laing.

Poems by Green have been published in the Best New Zealand Poems, including the 2002, 2004, and 2006 editions. She was guest editor for the publication in 2007. Green has also been selected as a featured poet in the journal, Poetry New Zealand, and appeared in the British literary journal Fire.

In 2010, with Harry Ricketts, she co-authored 99 Ways into New Zealand Poetry. She has also edited an anthology of love poems entitled Dear Heart: 150 New Zealand Love Poems.

In 2019 Green published Wild Honey: Reading NZ Women's Poetry (Massey University Press) which was shortlisted for the Ockham NZ Book Awards in 2020.

Green has been a judge for several literary awards including the New Zealand Post Book Awards, 2008 New Zealand Post Secondary School Poetry Competition, and 2014 Sarah Broom Poetry Prize.

Green maintains two blogs with a focus on poetry, one targeting adults, NZ Poetry Shelf, and the other aimed at children, NZ Poetry Box.

== Awards ==
Green won the poetry prize in the 2017 Prime Minister's Awards for Literary Achievement.

In the 2017 New Year Honours, Green was appointed a Member of the New Zealand Order of Merit for services as a poet and to literature.

In 2025 Green was awarded the Margaret Mahy Award for her work and writing in children’s literature.

=== Book awards ===
99 Ways into New Zealand Poetry was a finalist in the General Non-Fiction category of the 2011 New Zealand Post Book Awards.

The Storylines Children's Literature Charitable Trust of New Zealand has recognised several of her children's books, three receiving the Notable Non-Fiction Book title (Flamingo Bendalingo: Poems from the Zoo in 2007, Treasury of NZ Poems for Children in 2015, and The Letterbox Cat & Other Poems, also in 2015) and Aunt Concertina and her Niece Evalina in 2010 as a Notable Picture Book.

The Letterbox Cat and Other Poems was shortlisted for the 2015 LIANZA Children's Book Awards and won the Children's Choice Non-Fiction Award at the 2015 New Zealand Post Book Awards for Children and Young Adults.

== Bibliography ==
=== Poetry collections ===
- Cookhouse (1997, Auckland University Press)
- Chrome (2000, Auckland University Press)
- Crosswind (2004, Auckland University Press)
- Making Lists for Francis Hodgkins (2007, Auckland University Press)
- Slip Stream (2010, Auckland University Press)
- The Baker's Thumbprint (2013, Seraph Press)
- New York Pocket Book (2017, Seraph Press)
- The Track (2019, Seraph Press)
- The Venetian Blind Poem (2025, The Cuba Press)

=== Poetry for children ===
- Flamingo Bendalingo: Poems from the Zoo (Auckland University Press, 2006), written with fifty children, illustrated by Michael Hight
- Macaroni Moon (Random House, 2009), illustrated by Sarah Laing
- The Letterbox Cat and Other Poems (Scholastic, 2014), illustrated by Myles Lawford
- Groovy Fish and Other Poems (The Cuba Press, 2019), illustrated by the author

=== Children's fiction ===
- The Terrible Night (Random House, 2008), junior novel, illustrated by Chris Grosz
- Aunt Concertina and Her Niece Evalina (Random House, 2009), picture book, illustrated by Michael Hight
- Little Tales of Hedgehog and Goat (Puffin, 2022), junior novel, illustrated by Kimberly Andrews

=== Non-fiction ===
- Writing Home to Her Mother and Father: Fabrizia Ramondino's Althénopis and Clara Sereni's Casalinghitudine (University of Auckland, 2004), doctoral thesis
- 99 Ways into New Zealand Poetry (Vintage, 2010), with Harry Ricketts
- Wild Honey: Reading New Zealand Women's Poetry (Massey University Press, 2019)

=== As editor ===
- Best New Zealand Poems 2007 (International Institute of Modern Letters, 2007), online anthology
- Dear Heart: 150 New Zealand Love Poems (Godwit, 2012)
- A Treasury of New Zealand Poems for Children (Random House, 2014), illustrated by Jenny Cooper
- Roar Squeak Purr: A New Zealand Treasury of Animal Poems (Puffin, 2022), illustrated by Jenny Cooper
