= Bernardine R. Leist =

American screenwriter

- Born: Bernadine Risse; August 1880; Kansas City, Kansas, US
- Died: October 26, 1926; New York City, New York, US
- Occupation: Screenwriter
- Spouse: Louis Leist (m. 1906—his death)

Bernardine R. Leist (sometimes credited as Bernadine Risse) (1880-1926) was an American screenwriter and actress active during Hollywood's silent film era; she spent time at both Biograph Studio and Edison Studio during her time in the industry.

== Biography ==
Leist was born in Kansas City, Kansas, to John Risse and Rose McCurran. After acting in local productions in her native city and working as an elocution teacher, she arrived in New York City sometime in the early 1900s. Initially, she worked as an actress in theatrical productions, but she forged a career as a scenarist in the fledgling motion pictures industry.

Leist married Louis Leist in 1906; he died two years later. She married her second husband, police captain John White, in 1926,. Later that year, Leist fell to her death from the roof in their apartment in the Bronx.

== Selected filmography ==
- A String of Pearls (1912)
- The Long Road (1911)
- Italian Blood (1911)
- Dan the Dandy (1911)
- Waiter No. 5 (1910)
- The Iconoclast (1910)
