= Itapetinga =

Municipality of Bahia, Brazil

Coordinates: 15.2535°S 40.2555°W

Itapetinga, Bahia, Brazil
- Municipality
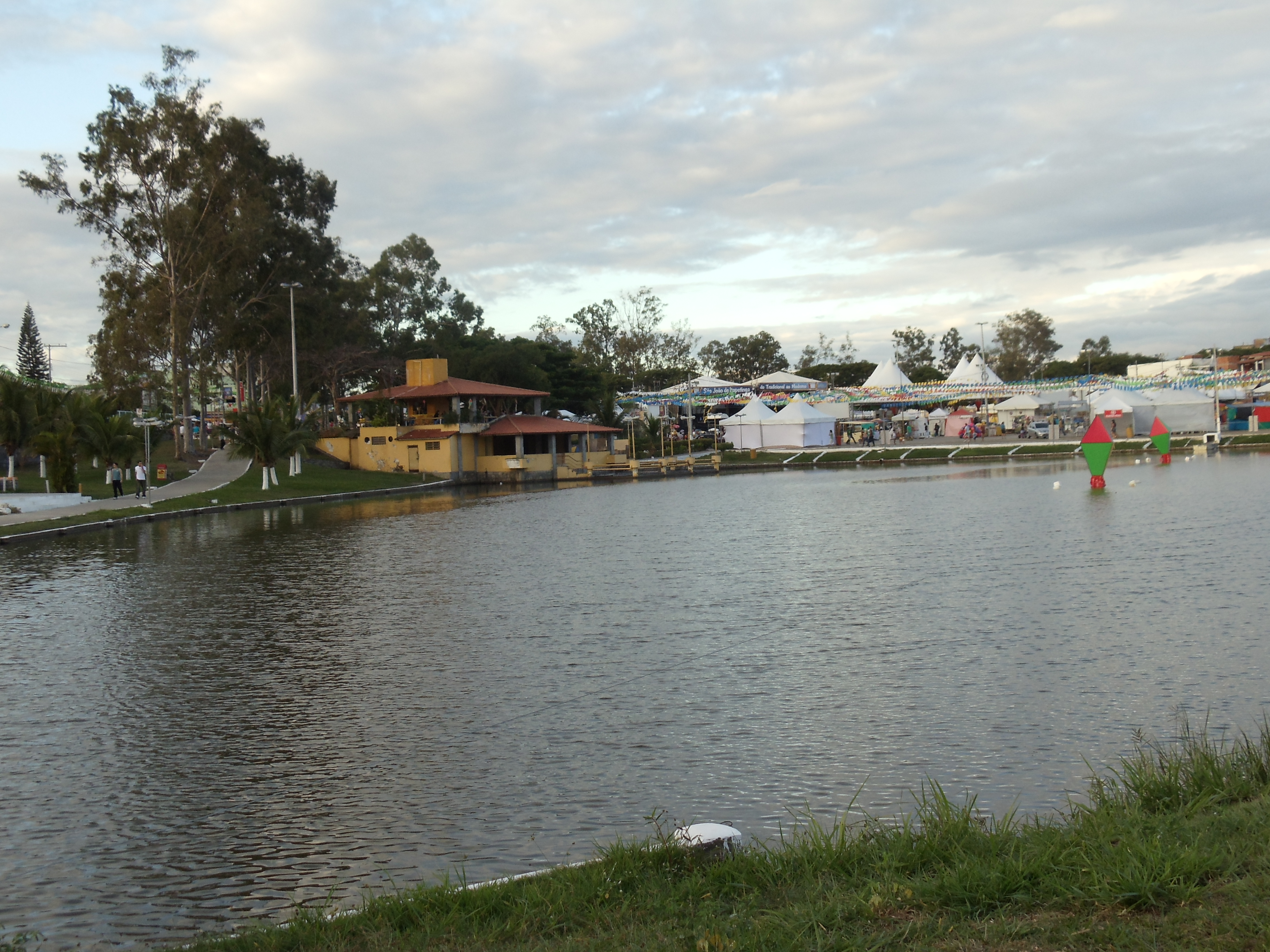
- Multisport Park of Pond (Parque Poliesportivo da Lagoa) in June festivities.

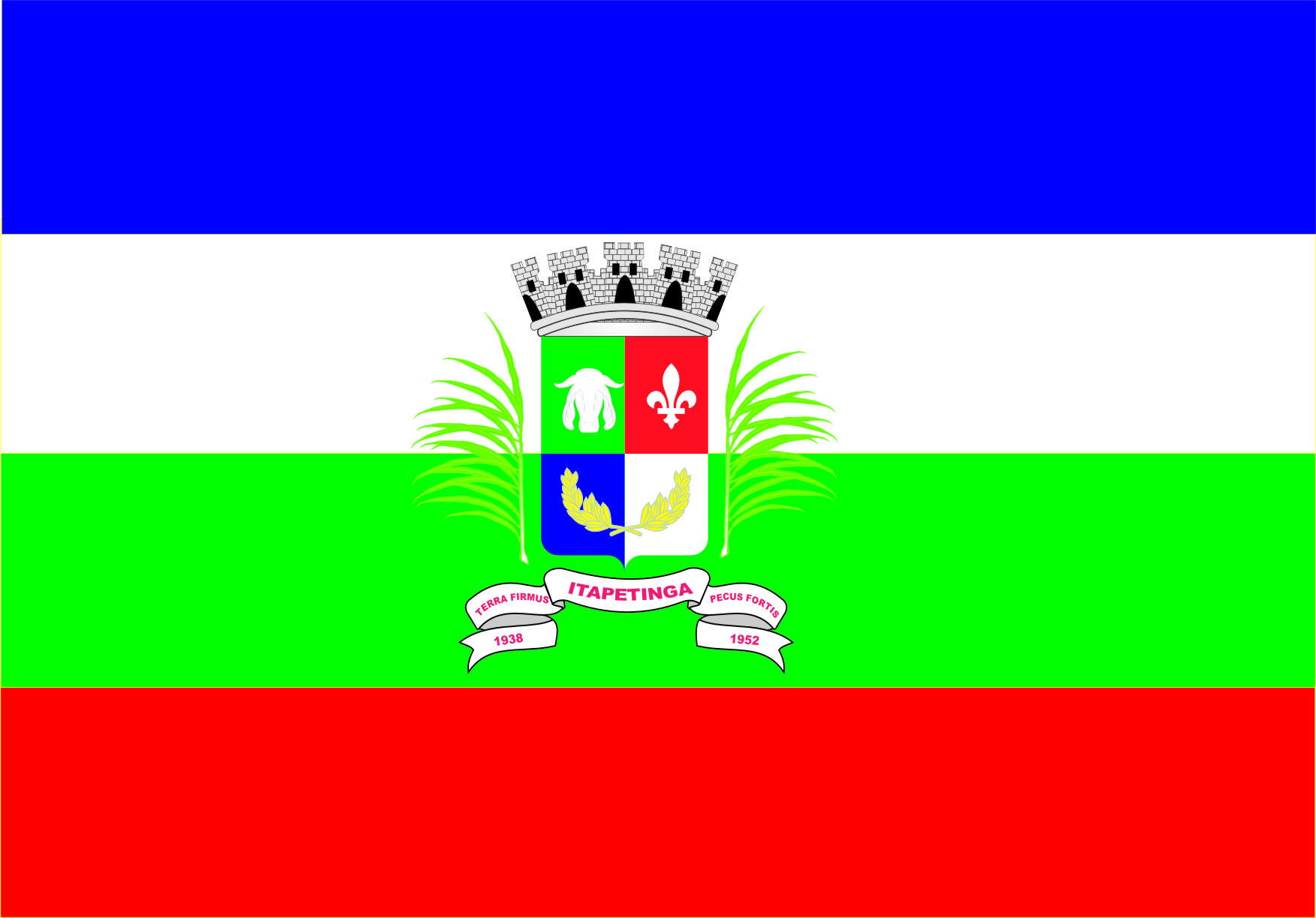
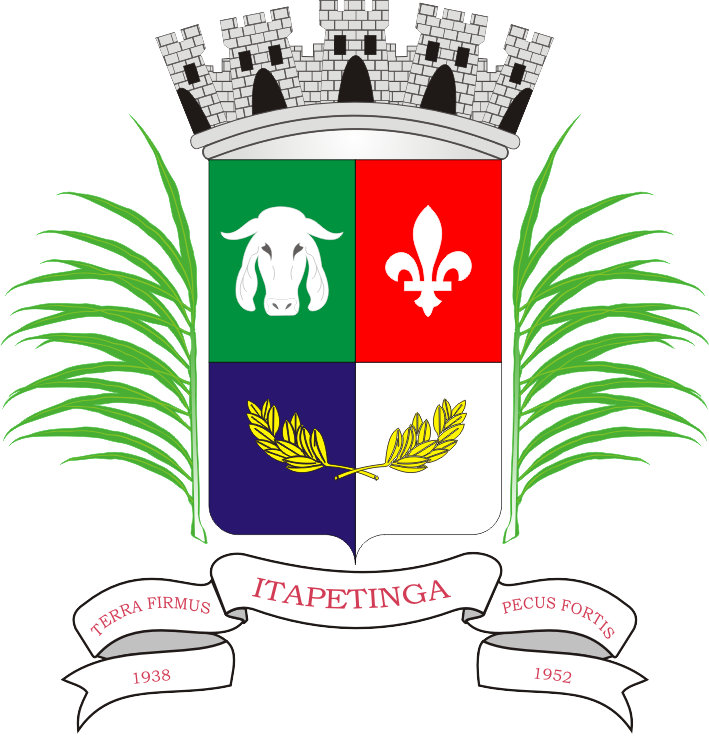
- Flag Coat of arms

- Country: Brazil
- Region: Nordeste
- State: Bahia

Government
  - Mayor: Eduardo Hagge

Population (2020)
  - Total: 76,795
- Time zone: UTC−3 (BRT)

Itapetinga, Bahia, Brazil is a municipality in the state of Bahia in the North-East region of Brazil. Its population in 2020, according to estimates by the IBGE, was 76,795, so it is the 24th most populous municipality of Bahia.

== Climate ==
Climate data for Itapetinga, elevation 268 m (879 ft)
Month	Jan	Feb	Mar	Apr	May	Jun	Jul	Aug	Sep	Oct	Nov	Dec	Year
Mean daily maximum °C (°F)	30.9 (87.6)	31.3 (88.3)	31.2 (88.2)	29.5 (85.1)	27.9 (82.2)	26.6 (79.9)	25.8 (78.4)	26.6 (79.9)	28.0 (82.4)	29.5 (85.1)	29.7 (85.5)	30.3 (86.5)	28.9 (84.0)
Daily mean °C (°F)	25.2 (77.4)	25.6 (78.1)	25.7 (78.3)	24.2 (75.6)	22.4 (72.3)	21.4 (70.5)	20.8 (69.4)	21.2 (70.2)	22.5 (72.5)	23.9 (75.0)	24.1 (75.4)	24.7 (76.5)	23.5 (74.3)
Mean daily minimum °C (°F)	20.4 (68.7)	20.5 (68.9)	20.7 (69.3)	19.9 (67.8)	18.3 (64.9)	16.9 (62.4)	16.2 (61.2)	16.2 (61.2)	17.5 (63.5)	19.0 (66.2)	19.9 (67.8)	20.3 (68.5)	18.8 (65.8)
Average precipitation mm (inches)	111.5 (4.39)	78.6 (3.09)	92.6 (3.65)	69.7 (2.74)	35.9 (1.41)	44.8 (1.76)	44.8 (1.76)	28.5 (1.12)	40.3 (1.59)	89.1 (3.51)	148.2 (5.83)	131.7 (5.19)	914.4 (36.00)
Source: Universidade Federal de Campina Grande

== Sister cities ==
- Cerritos, California, United States

== See also ==
- List of municipalities in Bahia
