= Ana Cristina Rego =

Portuguese neuroscientist

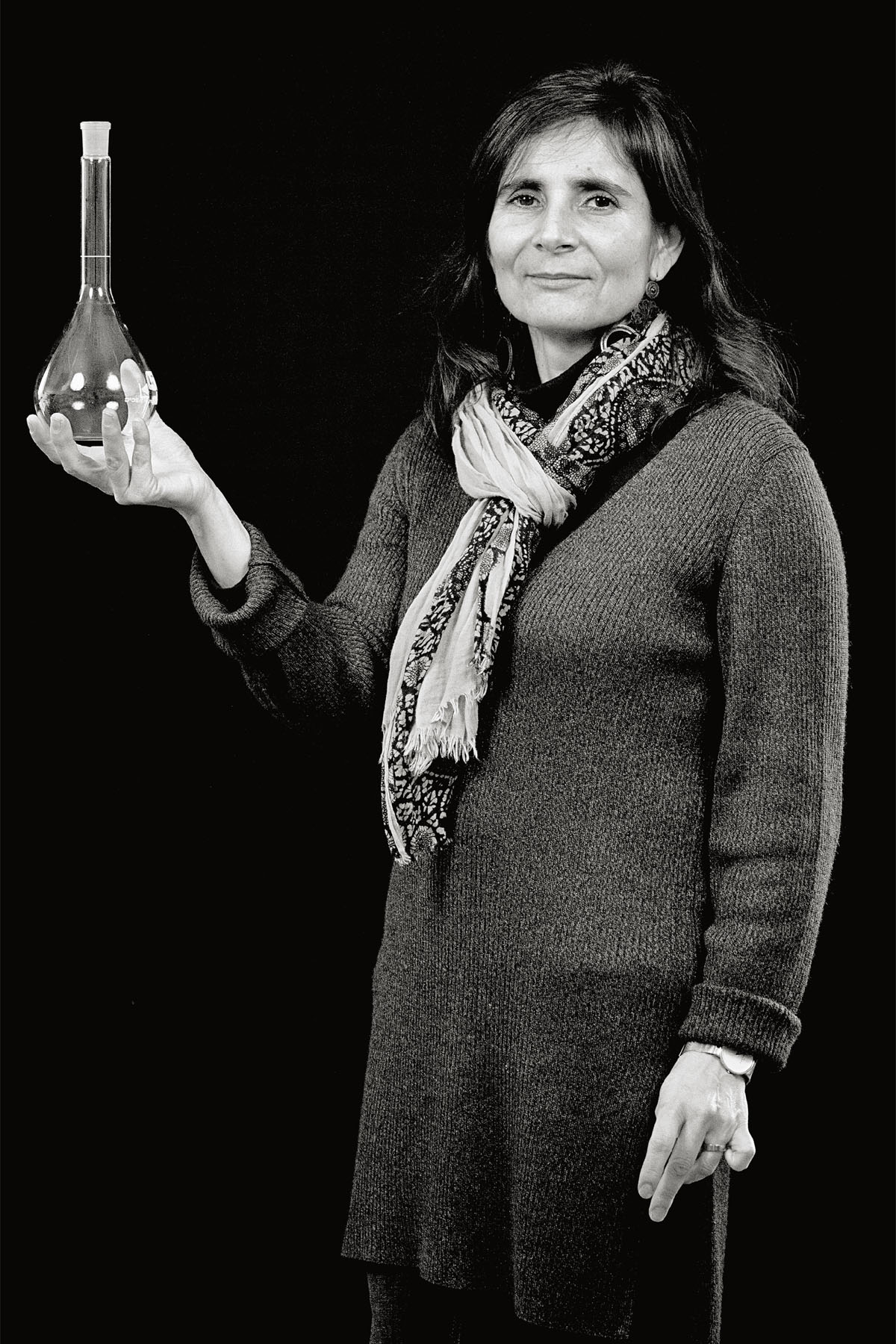
- Cristina Rego in 2016.
- Born: Ana Cristina Rego; Portugal
- Occupation: Neuroscientist
- Known for: Studies on neurodegenerative diseases such as Alzheimer's

Ana Cristina Rego is a Portuguese neurologist. She is a professor at the University of Coimbra in Portugal and is head of the research group on Mitochondria and Neurodegenerative disorders, researching on topics such as Alzheimer's disease, Huntingdon's disease, and Parkinson's disease. She is presently president of the Portuguese Society of Neuroscience.

== Training ==
Ana Cristina Carvalho Rego obtained the Bachelor degree in Biology in 1991 the Master degree in cell biology in 1994 and a PhD in Cell Biology in January 1999 from the University of Coimbra, under the supervision of Prof. Catarina Resende de Oliveira.

== Career ==
Rego began work in 1997 as a teaching assistant at the Faculty of Medicine of the University of Coimbra (FMUC). After obtaining her doctorate, she became an assistant professor in 1999, receiving tenure in 2004 and Aggregation (Agregação) in 2010. She became an associate professor in 2019, teaching classes in biochemistry, neuroscience and neurobiology at the Centre for Neuroscience and Cell Biology (CNC) at the university. During the period 1998-2000 she was also a post-doctoral researcher in the laboratory of Prof. David G. Nicholls, at the University of Dundee in Scotland and visiting researcher at the David Nicholls Lab of the Buck Institute for Research on Aging, in Novato, California.

Rego's research group at CNC aims to understand fundamental cell and molecular mechanisms in early/initial stages of brain neurodegenerative disorders including Huntington's, Parkinson's and Alzheimer's diseases, for which there is still no cure. The initial steps of neuronal dysfunction, occurring before the main disease-related symptoms, are still not completely understood. To address these issues, she has obtained funding from the CHDI Foundation (USA), the Lundbeck Foundation, the Fundação para a Ciência e a Tecnologia (Foundation for Science and Technology-FCT), which is the Portuguese state body that awards grants for scientific research, and from the European Huntington's Disease Network. She became president of the Portuguese Society for Neuroscience in 2019 and is vice-president of the Portuguese Brain Council. She is a reviewer for funding bodies, including Parkinson's UK, Alzheimer's Research UK, the Austrian Science Fund, Agence nationale de la recherche in France, the Israel Science Foundation, the Wellcome Trust and the Alzheimer's Association.

== Publications ==
Rego acts as a reviewer for many scientific journals. She has published over 125 peer-reviewed journal articles. Some of those for which she has been the senior author are listed below. Together with Carlos B. Duarte and Catarina Resende de Oliveira she has written a 700-page textbook for medical students, entitled Neurosciences

- AC Rego, CR Oliveira. Mitochondrial dysfunction and reactive oxygen species in excitotoxicity and apoptosis: implications for the pathogenesis of neurodegenerative diseases. Neurochemical research 28 (10), 1563-1574 509
- AC Rego, MS Santos, CR Oliveira. Oxidative stress, hypoxia, and ischemia-like conditions increase the release of endogenous amino acids by distinct mechanisms in cultured retinal cells. Journal of neurochemistry 66 (6), 2506-2516
- AC Rego, MS Santos, CR Oliveira. Influence of the antioxidants vitamin E and idebenone on retinal cell injury mediated by chemical ischemia, hypoglycemia, or oxidative stress. Free Radical Biology and Medicine 26 (11-12), 1405-1417
- AC Rego, MW Ward, DG Nicholls. Mitochondria control ampa/kainate receptor-induced cytoplasmic calcium deregulation in rat cerebellar granule cells. Journal of Neuroscience 21 (6), 1893-1901
- AC Rego, MS Santos, CR Oliveira. Adenosine triphosphate degradation products after oxidative stress and metabolic dysfunction in cultured retinal cells. Journal of neurochemistry 69 (3), 1228-1235
- AC Rego, CR Oliveira. Dual effect of lipid peroxidation on the membrane order of retinal cells in culture. Archives of biochemistry and biophysics 321 (1), 127-136 37
- AC Rego, MS Santos, CR Oliveira. Glutamate-mediated inhibition of oxidative phosphorylation in cultured retinal cells. Neurochemistry international 36 (2), 159-166
- AC Rego, LP de Almeida. Molecular targets and therapeutic strategies in Huntington's disease. Current Drug Targets-CNS & Neurological Disorders 4 (4), 361-381
