= Bernadette Lim =

American physician and community organizer

Bernadette "Bernie" Lim (born July 15, 1994) is an American physician and community organizer. She is the founder of the Freedom Community Clinic based in Oakland, CA. She is lecturer faculty at the Institute for Holistic Health Studies at San Francisco State University.

== Early life and education ==
Lim was born in Los Angeles, CA. She attended St. Lucy's Priory High School in Glendora, CA and served as the California-Nevada-Hawaii KIWIN'S Governor for Key Club International. Lim attended Harvard University where she received a Bachelor of Arts in Human Evolutionary Biology and Global Health and received cum laude honors. As part of her undergraduate career, she created Women SPEAK, a national girls' empowerment non-profit and was the lead author of the first Status of Women and Girls in Boston report. She was also a regular contributor to The Harvard Crimson. Lim was made a Fulbright scholar in 2016, and moved to Pune, India to pursue public health research on gender disparities among healthcare workers.

She completed her masters and medical education at UC Berkeley School of Public Health and UCSF School of Medicine in 2017, as part of the UC Berkeley-UCSF Joint Medical Program. During her time in medical school, she founded several initiatives related to community health, health equity, and racial justice, including the Freedom School for Intersectional Medicine, the Institute for Healing & Justice in Medicine, and the Woke WOC Docs podcast. She wrote her Masters thesis on Filipino youth health disparities. She is an activist and speaker on eliminating inequities in health care and expanding integrative medicine for underserved populations. In 2019, she was honored as the youngest ever recipient and only medical student awardee of the National Minority Quality Forum 40 Under 40 Leaders in Minority Health.

== Career ==
In 2019, Lim founded the Freedom Community Clinic in Oakland, CA while in medical school. During medical school, Lim would participate in community organizing efforts for youth and gained mentorship from activists such as Dr. Tolbert Small, former physician to the Black Panther Party. Motivated by her family's experiences of trauma in the medical system, her Filipino-Toisan ancestry, and her involvement in community organizing, she started the Freedom Community Clinic, a non-profit that combines the strengths of ancestral and holistic healing with Western biomedicine and provides direct healing services to Black, Brown, Native, and immigrant communities in the Bay Area. She started the clinic through the Oakland Youth Impact Hub and held several pop-up healing clinics on the streets during its beginnings.

In 2021, Lim announced on Twitter that she would not be applying to residency after graduating medical school in order to pursue her work at Freedom Community Clinic full-time. She writes and speaks often about issues of health and well-being in academic medicine and holistic healing for underserved communities.

== Awards and honors ==
- 2016 Glamour Magazine College Woman of the Year
- 2016 Fulbright scholar
- 2017 Pacific Standard Magazine Top 30 Under 30 Thinkers in Policy and Social Justice
- 2019 National Minority Quality Forum 40 Under 40 Leaders in Minority Health
- 2019 Dalai Lama Fellow
- 2020 Yamashita Prize for Outstanding Social Change Activist in California
- 2020 World Policy Forum Global Solutions’ Initiative Young Global Changer
- 2021 The California Endowment Youth Voices For Change Award
- 2022 Social Mission Alliance Fitzhugh Mullan Rising Star Award
- 2022 Echoing Green Fellow
- 2023 San Francisco Business Times Most Influential Bay Area Women in Bay Area Business
