= Bernadette Luciano =

New Zealand Italian language and culture academic

Bernadette Mary Luciano
- Education: Columbia University
- Scientific career
- Fields: Italian studies
- Workplaces: University of California, Santa Barbara, Columbia University, the University of Minnesota, California State University San Diego, Stanford University, University of Auckland
- Thesis: Porta and Dante: a study of Porta's translations from the "Inferno" (1990)
- Doctoral students: Paula Green

Bernadette Mary Luciano is a New Zealand Italian language and culture academic, and a full professor at the University of Auckland. Luciano serves as Italian honorary consul in Auckland.

== Academic career ==
After a 1990 PhD thesis titled 'Porta and Dante: a study of Porta's translations from the "Inferno"' at Columbia University, Luciano worked in many American universities, before moving to the University of Auckland and rising to full professor.

== Selected works ==
- Luciano, Bernadette, and Susanna Scarparo. Reframing Italy: New Trends in Italian Women's Filmmaking. Purdue University Press, 2013.
- Luciano, Bernadette. "The Diaries of Sibilla Aleramo: Constructing Female Subjectivity." Italian Women Writers from the Renaissance to the Present: Revising the Canon (1996): 95–110.
- Luciano, Bernadette, and Susanna Scarparo. "Gendering mobility and migration in contemporary Italian cinema." The Italianist 30, no. 2 (2010): 165–182.
- Luciano, Bernadette. "Rethinking identity in the cinema of Silvio Soldini." In Forum for Modern Language Studies, vol. 38, no. 3, pp. 341–351. Oxford University Press, 2002.
