= Curriculum development =

Planned and systematic process of creating or improving a curriculum

Curriculum development is a planned, progressive, purposeful and systematic process in order to make positive improvements in the curriculum and education system. Various approaches have been used in developing curricula. Commonly used approaches consist of analysis (i.e. need analysis, task analysis), design (i.e. objective design), selecting (i.e. choosing appropriate learning/teaching methods and appropriate assessment methods) formation (i.e. formation of the curriculum implementation committee / curriculum evaluation committee) and review (i.e. curriculum review committee).

1. Analysis
2. Design
3. Selecting
4. Formation
5. Review

== Early childhood care and education (ECCE) ==
There is no single curriculum that is 'best' for all situations. Not only does geographic location depend on the type of curriculum taught, but the demographics of the population matters as well. Some curriculums are heavily based on science and technology while another focused mainly on the arts. However, a comparison of different curricula shows certain approaches to be generally more effective than others. Comprehensive programmes addressing health, nutrition and development have proven to be the most effective in early childhood, especially in programmes directed at very young and vulnerable children. This requires a genuine commitment from agencies and individuals to work together, to plan projects collaboratively, and to involve parents and communities.

== Humanistic curriculum development ==
A humanistic curriculum is a curriculum based on intercultural education that allows for the plurality of society while striving to ensure a balance between pluralism and universal values. In terms of policy, this view sees curriculum frameworks as means to bridge broad educational goals and the processes to reach them. A humanistic curriculum development perspective holds that for curriculum frameworks to be legitimate, the process of policy dialogue to define educational goals must be participatory and inclusive. Central to this view is that curriculum policy and content must both be guided by the principles of social and economic justice, equality and environmental responsibility that erases the pillars of sustainable development.

== Sources ==
This article incorporates text from a free content work. Licensed under CC BY-SA IGO 3.0 (license statement/permission). Text taken from Rethinking Education: Towards a global common good?, 41-42, UNESCO. UNESCO. This article incorporates text from a free content work. Licensed under CC BY-SA IGO 3.0 (license statement/permission). Text taken from Investing against Evidence: The Global State of Early Childhood Care and Education, 243-265, Marope, P.T.M., Kaga, Y., UNESCO. UNESCO.
