= Bernadette Roberts =

American Carmelite nun and contemplative (1931–2017)

- Born: 1931; California, United States
- Died: 2017 (aged 85–86); Laguna Beach, California, United States
- Education: University of Southern California, University of Utah
- Occupations: Contemplative, author, educator
- Known for: Christian mysticism, "no-Self" experience, Carmelite spirituality
- Notable work: The Experience of No-Self, The Path to No-Self, The Real Christ
- Children: 4

Bernadette Roberts (1931–2017) was a Carmelite nun and contemplative in the Latin Catholic Church.

== Biography ==
Bernadette Roberts was born in 1931 in California to devout Catholic parents. She entered the Monastery of Discalced Carmelites in Alhambra, California when she was seventeen in January 1949. After eight and a half years of monastic life, Roberts left the cloister and entered the University of Utah where she was a pre-medical student for three years. After studies in Utah she returned to her parents' home in Hollywood, California, and obtained a degree in philosophy from the University of Southern California. She taught physiology and algebra at Our Lady of Loretto High School in Los Angeles for four years, where she met and married a fellow teacher, with whom she had four children. Roberts went on to obtain a Montessori credential in London, England, and opened her own Montessori school in Kalispell, Montana, in 1969. In her Montessori school, Roberts repeated all of Piaget's cognitive (developmental) experiments with children. In 1973 she obtained a master's degree in early childhood education from the University of Southern California. In 1976, Roberts's husband left her and the children, after which she obtained a church annulment. Between trying to earn a living, raise her children, and helping out with grandchildren, Roberts had a very busy life. For the last forty years she annually made extended retreats with the Camaldolese Monks on the Big Sur in California. She often said that "Camaldoli is my only true home on this earth." Roberts died in 2017 in her home in Southern California in her sleep.

== Spiritual life and experiences ==
Roberts extensively chronicled and described her life and spiritual journey. Her book Contemplative: Autobiography of the Early Years (Note: In the Introduction to the book, available here Roberts wrote, "This book is an account of my spiritual journey from birth to seventeen. Since my book The Path to No-Self, begins at age seventeen, the present book covers the earlier years and my initial steps in the contemplative path. The purpose of this writing is both to give this background and give witness to God's work in a single soul. Since God is at work in every soul, it is up to each of us to give our own account, no one else can do this for us.") presents an account of her early family life and spiritual experiences. Her spiritual journey after entering the cloister is described in The Path to No-Self: Life at the Center. This book includes descriptions of her experience of the "Dark Nights" and of the state of "Union," as spoken of by various Christian mystics. After years of life in union with God, Roberts described an event she calls the experience of "no-Self" in The Experience of No-Self: A Contemplative Journey. The book only covers a two-year period after the events described; however, Roberts has further elaborated on the context of this event. After the first publication of The Experience, Roberts was invited to speak around the country, to present her talk, "A Passage Through Self," that uses a series of circles to illustrate the spiritual journey. (Note: In introducing a DVD recording of this talk, available here, Roberts wrote, "This talk uses a series of circles to illustrate the journey in terms of consciousness - defined as the whole self-experience and medium of the Divine's revelation to man. Particular emphasis is given to the journey's major milestones: first, transcendence of the ego-self and revelation of the True Self in its oneness with God (the Unitive State). Second, the further movement into the marketplace that ultimately ends with the falling away of the True-self and the Unitive State. An overview of this passage revealed how and in what way the ultimate fulfillment of self or consciousness is no-Self or no-Consciousness.") For the last 30 years Roberts gave annual retreats entitled "The Essence of Christian Mysticism," in which she presented the essence of Christian mysticism as Trinity, Christ, and Faith. (Note: A nine-hour recording of this retreat is available here.) Her last work was The Real Christ (2012). (Note: The book, which includes a warning to readers, is available here.)

== Works ==
The following is a list of books, and recordings by Bernadette Roberts:

- The Experience of No-Self: A Contemplative Journey. State University of New York Press (Revised Edition 1993); ISBN 0-7914-1694-1
- The Path to No-Self: Life at the Center (1985). State University of New York Press (New Edition 1991); ISBN 0791411427
- What is Self?: A Study of the Spiritual Journey in Terms of Consciousness. Sentient Publications (2005); ISBN 1-59181-026-4
- The Real Christ. Bernadette Roberts (2012)
- Essays on the Christian Contemplative Journey. Bernadette Roberts (2007)
- Contemplative: Autobiography of the Early Years. Bernadette Roberts (2004)
- "The Essence of Christian Mysticism". Bernadette Roberts (2012, DVD)
- "A Passage Through Self". Bernadette Roberts (1987, DVD)

== Personal life ==
Roberts shared four children with former husband Ron Danko: Mark, Marcel, Melanie, and Michaela ('Kayla'). She had seven grandchildren. Throughout her later years Roberts resided in Santa Monica, California, then briefly in Laguna Beach, California, where she died in 2017, one year after she was diagnosed with ALS.
