= Piyumi Wijesekara =

American-Sri Lankan postdoctoral research scientist

Piyumi Wijesekara is an American-Sri Lankan postdoctoral research scientist.

== Career ==
She is attached with the Radiation Biophysics Laboratory at NASA Ames Research Centre in California's Silicon Valley. Her research area has been emphasized especially on developing tissue models to investigate the effects of spaceflight stressors, inclusive of ionization of radiation and lunar dust on the human respiratory system.

She obtained her bachelor's degree in the field of bioengineering from the University of California, San Diego in 2015. She also received her master's degree in biomedical engineering from Carnegie Mellon University in 2017. She obtained her doctorate degree in biomedical engineering from Carnegie Mellon University in 2022. Her doctoral research has focused primarily on stem cell and organ engineering, with an emphasis on engineering lung models that mimic human lung physiology, to study respiratory diseases.

In April 2024, she was chosen among NASA’s four-member new volunteer crew alongside Jason Lee, Stephanie Navarro and Shareef Al Romaithi to participate in a simulated mission to planet Mars within a habitat at the agency's Johnson Space Centre in Houston. She currently lives in San Francisco, USA.
