= Jessica Le Bas =

New Zealand poet

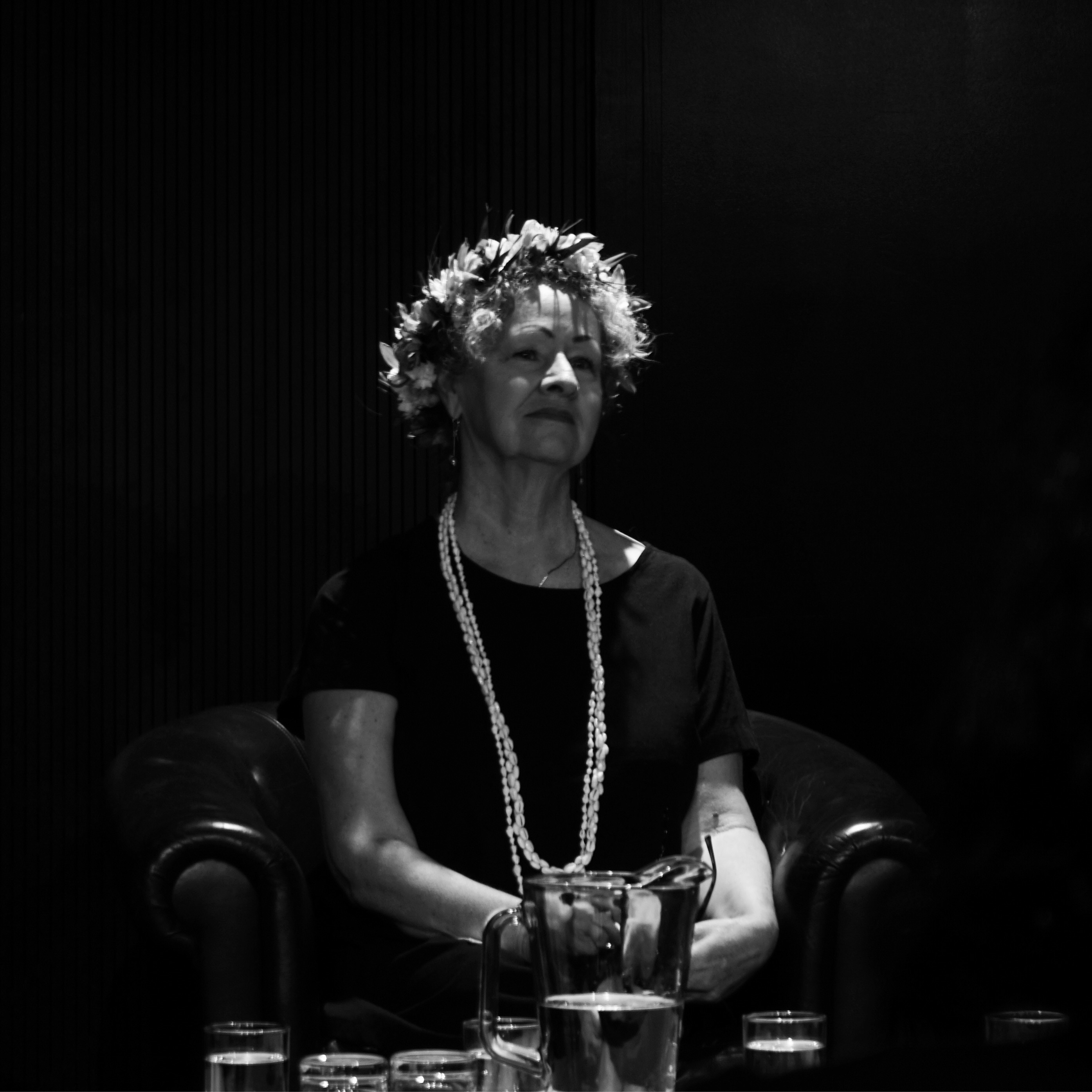
- Le Bas at the Sarah Broom Poetry Prize ceremony at Auckland Writers Festival 2019, in Auckland, New Zealand
- Education: University of Auckland
- Writing career
- Language: English
- Genre: Poetry
- Notable works: Incognito, Walking to Africa
- Notable awards: NZSA Jessie Mackay Best First Book Award for Poetry, Sarah Broom Poetry Prize 2019

Jessica Le Bas is a Nelson-based poet from New Zealand.

== Background ==
Le Bas received her MA(Hons) from the University of Auckland.

== Career ==
During the Balkan Wars, Le Bas worked for the United Nations as a Training Consultant for UNPROFOR. She has worked at the Beehive in Wellington as Private Secretary to a government Minister. She took Owen Marshall's Fiction Writing Course at Aoraki Polytechnic in 1997, and later received a writers' grant from Creative New Zealand.

Le Bas has published two collections of poetry, Incognito in 2007, and Walking to Africa in 2009. In 2010, she published her first children's book, Staying Home: My True Diary of Survival, under the pseudonym ‘Jesse O’. In 2021 the novel was re-released by Penguin Books New Zealand as Locked Down, and was illustrated by Toby Morris. Le Bas and her novel featured at the 2021 Auckland Writers' Festival as part of the Schools' Programme.

Poems by Le Bas have appeared in Landfall, Poetry Aotearoa Yearbook, and the Best New Zealand Poems series in 2007. She has also published in a number of other literary journals including Sport, Blackmail Press, and Trout. She was featured in issue 32 of Poetry New Zealand.

== Awards ==
Incognito won the 2007 NZSA Jessie Mackay Best First Book Award for Poetry at the Montana New Zealand Book Awards.

In 2007, she received a New Zealand Mental Health Foundation Media Grant to write Walking to Africa, which was a finalist in the Ashton Wylie Book Awards.

Le Bas has also won the New Zealand Poetry Society International Poetry Competition, 2005 Bravado Poetry Competition, and been shortlisted in the Landfall Essay Competition.

In 2019, she won the 2019 Sarah Broom Poetry Prize with a short collection of poems titled Large Ocean Islands that arose from living and working in the Cook Islands between 2017 and 2020.

In 2025, she placed third in the Te Tauihu Short Story Award, was runner-up in the takahē (Monica Taylor) Poetry Competition, and received a Highly Commended award in the Katherine Mansfield Sparkling Prose Competition.
