= Bernie Dwyer =

Irish journalist and activist

- Born: 14 December 1943; Dublin, Ireland
- Died: 10 July 2013 (aged 69); Dublin, Ireland
- Occupations: Filmmaker, journalist, activist

Bernie Dwyer (14 December 1943 – 10 July 2013) was an Irish journalist, filmmaker and political activist.

== Life ==
Dwyer was born Bernie Hannon in Dublin in 1943. In 1967, she married David Dwyer. Throughout the 1970s and 1980s, Dwyer worked as an early childhood educator with children with intellectual disabilities and with Women's Aid as a childcare worker. She studied for a degree in philosophy in Trinity College Dublin in 1983, and became active in student politics as well as the campaign against the Eighth Amendment of the Constitution of Ireland. After graduation, she became a lecturer in University College Dublin. She became involved in the Cuba Solidarity Campaign in the late 1980s, working with Michael O'Riordan. She went on to campaign on behalf of the Cuban Five and spent time in Cuba working for Radio Havana. She was awarded the Felix Elmuza medal in 2008. Dwyer died in Dublin on 10 July 2013.
