= Bernadette Maynard =

American politician (1907–2000)

Member of the Connecticut House of Representatives from Lisbon
- In office 1955–1959
- Preceded by: Harry Welch
- Succeeded by: Eva Harris

Personal details
- Born: Bernadette Coblentz; January 2, 1907 Wauregan, Connecticut, U.S.
- Died: November 12, 2000 (aged 93)
- Party: Republican
- Spouse: Alpherie J. Maynard (m. 1928; died 1977)
- Children: 2
- Education: Norwich Free Academy

Bernadette Maynard (January 2, 1907 – November 12, 2000) was an American politician who served in the Connecticut House of Representatives from 1955 to 1959, representing the town of Lisbon as a Republican.

== Personal life ==
Maynard was born Bernadette Coblentz on January 2, 1907, in Wauregan, Connecticut, and graduated from the nearby Norwich Free Academy. As an adult, she worked as a news correspondent for The Bulletin and The Hartford Times. On February 14, 1928, she married Alpherie J. Maynard. Together, they had two children.

Maynard died on November 12, 2000, at the age of 93.

== Political career ==
Maynard was elected to the Connecticut House of Representatives in 1954, and she served two terms representing the town of Lisbon as a Republican. She ran for reelection in 1958, but was defeated by Democratic candidate Eva Harris.
