= Murder of Bernadett Szabó =

2009 murder in Amsterdam, Netherlands

Bernadett Szabó
- Born: 1990; Hungary
- Died: February 19, 2009 (aged 18–19); Amsterdam, The Netherlands
- Cause of death: Stabbing
- Occupation: Sex worker

Bernadett "Betty" Szabó was a sex worker in the red light district of Amsterdam. On February 19, 2009, she was stabbed to death whilst working at a brothel, her killer has never been found.

== Life ==
Szabó was born in Hungary. According to police, Szabó had a tough life, described as having been one of "hardship and resilience".

Aged 18, Szabó moved to Amsterdam, where she worked as a sex worker. Becoming pregnant soon after arriving, she carried on working throughout her pregnancy, returning to the job shortly after her son was born.

== Murder ==
During the early hours of 19 February 2009, fellow sex workers in the building that Szabó also worked in noticed that music that Szabó usually had played had stopped. Entering the room where she worked, they located Szabó's body; she had been brutally stabbed to death.

== Investigation ==
=== Initial investigations ===
Police reviewed CCTV and conducted witness interviews, suspecting that the suspect was a visitor to the Netherlands from outside the country. However, with no suspects identified, the case turned cold.

=== 2024 cold case review ===
In 2024, police used a 3D computer-generated hologram of Szabó behind a window within the red light district, using the innovative technology in an attempt to solve the case. The likeness of Szabó is dressed in denim hotpants, a bra with leopard-print styling and shows a tattoo across her stomach and chest. The hologram moves, reaching out and appearing to knock on the window, before leaning forward, breathing on the glass and writing the word 'help'.

Police offered a €30,000 reward to encourage witnesses to come forward.

On 7 October 2025, the police announced that DNA evidence had produced matches linking two individuals to the case, and urged them to contact law enforcement immediately.
