= Bernadette Dupont =

French politician (born 1936)

Bernadette Dupont (born 6 December 1936) is a French politician and a former member of the Senate of France. She represented the Yvelines department from 2004 to 2011 as a member of the Union for a Popular Movement Party.
