= Joy Kwesiga =

Ugandan academic, gender specialist and community activist

Joy Constance Kwesiga
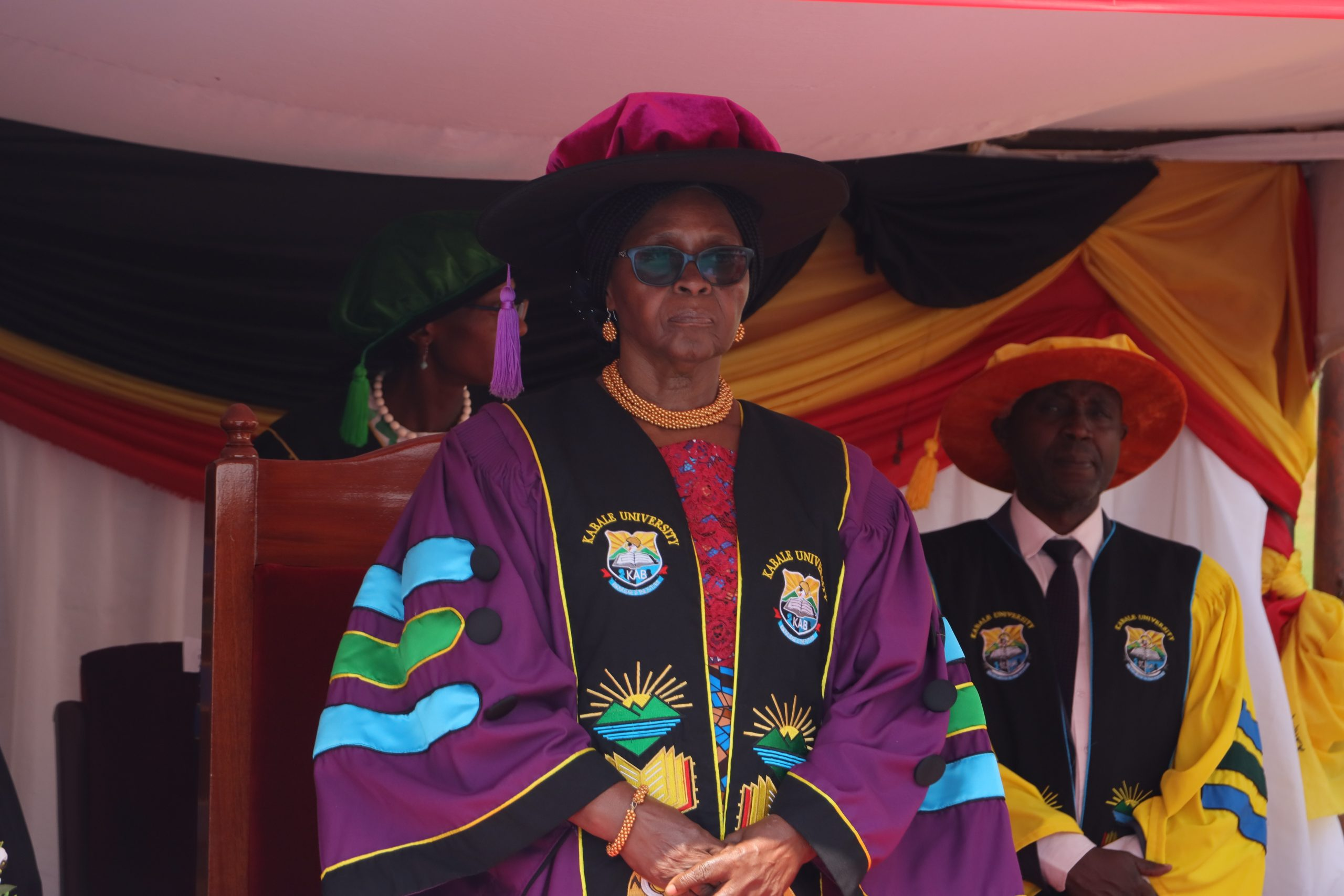
- Kwesiga in 2021
- Born: 3 May 1943 (age 83); Kabale, Uganda
- Citizenship: Uganda
- Education: Makerere University (BA in Geography) (doctorate in education and gender issues); Uganda Management Institute (diploma in public administration); University of London; Master of Arts in higher education)
- Occupation: Academic administrator
- Years active: 1967–present
- Title: Vice chancellor Kabale University

Joy Constance Kwesiga (born 3 May 1943) is a Ugandan academic, academic administrator, gender specialist, and community activist. She is the vice chancellor of Kabale University, a public institution of higher education in Uganda which was accredited by the Uganda National Council for Higher Education in 2005.

== Background and education ==
Kwesiga was born in present-day Rukiga District, in the Western Region of Uganda in 1943. She is the daughter of Andrew Mafigiri, a member of the Anglican Church laity, and Esteri Mafigiri, a housewife.

She attended Kabale Girls' Junior Boarding School for her elementary school. She then transferred to Gayaza High School for her O-Level and A-Level education. In 1964, she entered the University of East Africa at Makerere, graduating in 1968 with a Bachelor of Arts degree in geography. In 1979, she completed the postgraduate diploma program in public administration at the Uganda Institute of Public Administration (now the Uganda Management Institute). Her Master of Arts in higher education and Doctor of Philosophy in education and gender issues were obtained from the University of London in 1987 and 1993, respectively.

== Career ==
Following Kwesiga's graduation from the University of East Africa in 1967, she stayed on, working as an executive secretary in the university administration. She advanced to become the postgraduate studies deputy registrar by 1994. Between 1995 and 1998, she served as the head of the Department of Women and Gender Studies at Makerere University. From 1998 until 2001, she was the dean of the Faculty of Social Sciences at Makerere University. In 2001, she was appointed vice chancellor of Kabale University.

Kwesiga is currently participating in the ERASMUS-JMO-2021-MODULE. This project is for spreading women's empowerment and active citizenship values to enhance union policies combating gender discrimination and violence in a globalized world.

== Women rights advocacy ==
Kwesiga was a founder member of Action for Development, a national women's rights organization which redirected the women's movement in Uganda during the 1980s and 1990s. She co-founded a national women rights body (Action for Development) and actively promoted gender equity in education through organisations such as Forum for African Women Educationalists (FAWE), where she represents Uganda on the FAWE Africa Board, Uganda Association of University Women, and African Women in Research and Development (AAWORD). She is s also a founding member of KOMAZA (2006), a civil society organisation with headquarters in Kabale, with the goal of empowering communities, especially girls and women, and other disadvantaged members of society.

== Books ==
- Women's Access to Higher Education in Africa: Uganda's Experience (Fountain Series in Gender Studies)
- African Women's Movements: Transforming Political Landscapes
- The Women's Movement in Uganda: History, Challenges, and Prospects

== Articles and papers ==
- "Gender mainstreaming in the university context: Prospects and challenges at Makerere University, Uganda"
- "On Student Access and Equity in a Reforming University: Makerere in the 1990s and Beyond"
- " Consultancy research as a barrier to strengthening social science research capacity in Uganda"
- "Gender Equity in Commonwealth Higher Education: Emerging Themes in Nigeria, South Africa, Sri Lanka, Tanzania and Uganda"
- "The women's movement in Uganda revisited: will the twenty-first century create a different strand?"
- "The doors have been left ajar: Women in contemporary African higher education"

== See also ==
- List of university leaders in Uganda
