= Bernardina =

Bernardina is a female given name. It may refer to:

- Bernardina Adriana Schramm, a New Zealand pianist and music teacher
- Princess Bernardina Christina Sophia of Saxe-Weimar-Eisenach, a princess of Saxe-Weimar-Eisenach and Schwarzburg-Rudolstadt
- Berny Boxem-Lenferink (Bernardina Maria Boxem-Lenferink), a Dutch middle-distance runner

== See also ==
- Bernardine
- Bernardino
