= Bernadett Kőszegi =

Hungarian volleyball player (1958–2015)

Personal information
- Nationality: Hungarian
- Born: 11 August 1958; Szombathely, Hungary
- Died: 22 March 2015 (aged 56)

Sport
- Sport: Volleyball

Bernadett Kőszegi (11 August 1958 – 22 March 2015) was a Hungarian volleyball player. She competed in the women's tournament at the 1980 Summer Olympics.
