= Bernie de Le Cuona =

British entrepreneur

- Born: Pretoria, South Africa
- Occupation(s): CEO and Founder of de Le Cuona

Bernie de Le Cuona is a South African-born British entrepreneur and fabric designer. She is the CEO and founder of de Le Cuona, a company that makes interior textiles and accessories using natural fibres.

== Life and career ==
De Le Cuona was born in Pretoria, South Africa. Her father was an engineer, and her mother was a stay-at-home mom. She lived on a farm in her early teens. She then studied architectural design in Johannesburg before traveling around Europe. She eventually moved to and settled in England, where she founded her brand de Le Cuona in 1992. Early on, her fabrics were mainly sold to the film industry for costume-making. By 2018, her main clientele became architects and interior designers.

In 2020, de Le Cuona launched a 100% organic linen fabric collection called Pure.

== Honours and awards ==
- 2010 - Art of Design Veranda Awards for Fabric design, judged by fashion designer Oscar de la Renta, and designers Rose Tarlow and Holly Hunt.
- 2019 - Elle Decoration, Russia for the Fabric Collection of the year
- 2019 - The World of Interiors, Showstopper Award
- 2020 - The 50 Most Influential People in British Luxury, Walpole Power List 2020
