= Bernadette O'Rourke =

Sociolinguist specializing in the minority languages and language ideologies

- Bernadette Ní Ruairc
- Occupations: professor, linguist

Academic background
- Education: Dublin City University
- Thesis: Attitudes towards minority languages: an investigation of young people's attitudes towards Irish and Galician (2005)
- Doctoral advisor: Bill Richardson

Academic work
- Discipline: Sociolinguistics
- Sub-discipline: Minority language
- Institutions: Heriot-Watt University

Bernadette O'Rourke (also known as Bernie O'Rourke) is an Irish linguist from County Clare. She is currently Professor of Sociolinguistics and Hispanic Studies at the University of Glasgow and is a specialist in the construction of difference through language and social inequalities. Her research focuses on "neophones" or new speakers of minority languages such as Irish Gaelic and Galician. She has also published and commented on the assumptions of monolinguism in Great Britain, particularly in the context of Brexit, public policy related to minority languages in Ireland, the UK, and Europe.

== Career ==
O'Rourke has taught at the Universidade da Corunha, Dublin City University, NUI Galway and Heriot-Watt University where she has taught Spanish and Sociolinguisitcs. In addition to expertise in Irish Gaelic and Galician, O'Rourke has also promoted the support of Gaelic education in Scotland.

== Publications ==
=== Books ===
- O'Rourke, Bernadette and J. Walsh. New Speakers of Irish in the Global Context. New Revival?. Routledge, 2020. ISBN 9781138243385.
- O'Rourke, Bernadette. Galician and Irish in the European Context: Attitudes Toward Weak and Strong Minority Languages. Palgrave Macmillan: New York, 2011. ISBN 978-0230574038.

=== Selected journal articles ===
- O’Rourke, Bernadette; Nandi, Anik (2019). "New speaker parents as grassroots policy makers in contemporary Galicia: ideologies, management and practices". Language Policy. 18 (4): 493–511. doi:10.1007/s10993-018-9498-y. ISSN 1568-4555.
- Brennan, Sara; O'Rourke, Bernadette (2019). "Commercialising the cúpla focal : New speakers, language ownership, and the promotion of Irish as a business resource". Language in Society. 48 (1): 125–145. doi:10.1017/S0047404518001148. ISSN 0047-4045.
- O'Rourke, Bernadette; Pujolar, Joan; Ramallo, Fernando (2015-01-01). "New speakers of minority languages: the challenging opportunity – Foreword". International Journal of the Sociology of Language (231): 1–20. doi:10.1515/ijsl-2014-0029. ISSN 1613-3668.
- O'Rourke, Bernadette; Walsh, John (2015-01-01). "New speakers of Irish: shifting boundaries across time and space". International Journal of the Sociology of Language (231): 63–83. doi:10.1515/ijsl-2014-0032. hdl:10379/6391. ISSN 1613-3668.
- O'Rourke, Bernadette; Ramallo, Fernando (2013). "Competing ideologies of linguistic authority amongst new speakers in contemporary Galicia". Language in Society. 42 (3): 287–305. doi:10.1017/S0047404513000249. ISSN 0047-4045.
- O’Rourke, Bernadette; Pujolar, Joan (2017-01-26). "From native speakers to "new speakers" – problematizing nativeness in language revitalization contexts". Histoire Épistémologie Langage (in French). 35 (2). Persée - Portail des revues scientifiques en SHS: 47–67. doi:10.3406/hel.2013.3457 (inactive 1 July 2025).
- O'Rourke, Bernadette (2011). "Whose Language Is It? Struggles for Language Ownership in an Irish Language Classroom". Journal of Language, Identity & Education. 10 (5): 327–345. doi:10.1080/15348458.2011.614545. ISSN 1534-8458.
