= Bernadette Charleux =

French polymer chemist

- Scientific career
- Fields: Polymer Chemistry
- Institutions: CNRS; Saint-Gobain
- Doctoral advisor: Christian Pichot

Bernadette Charleux is a French polymer chemist. She is a member of the Academia Europaea and a senior member of the Institut universitaire de France since 2009. Since 2012, she is the Deputy Vice-president of Research and Development at Saint-Gobain.

== Scientific work ==
Bernadette Charleux first worked on emulsion polymerization, which led to the creation of new materials : functional latexes, amphiphilic copolymers, etc. before turning to pioneering research on Reversible-deactivation radical polymerization in aqueous media. More recently, she has worked on the creation of nano-objects via the self-assembly of macromolecules.

This work has led to numerous patents.

== Prizes and distinctions ==
- Chevalier de la Légion d'honneur (2013)
- CNRS Silver Medal (2012)
- The Prix Grammaticakis-Neuman of the French Academy of Sciences (2011)
- Société chimique de France Prize, Materials, polymers, and elastomers division (2000)
- CNRS Bronze Medal (1997)
