= Bernadette Eberlein =

German dermatologist and allergologist

- Born: 1964 (age 61–62); Bavaria, Germany
- Occupations: Dermatologist, allergologist, academic, and researcher

Academic background
- Education: LMU Munich

Academic work
- Institutions: Technical University of Munich (TUM)

Bernadette Eberlein is a dermatologist, allergologist, academic, and researcher. She is the Senior Physician of the private outpatient clinic, the Photodermatology unit, the unit for Soft X-Ray Therapy at Technical University of Munich.

Eberlein has authored over 100 publications in medical journals. She led research aimed at cellular in vitro diagnostics, photodermatology, skin-physiological investigations, and several environmental health disorders.

== Education and career ==
Eberlein studied at LMU Munich with a study scholarship of the Bavarian scholarship programme for gifted students, and completed her Study of medicine in 1989, and her Doctorate at the Department of Dermatology of the university in 1990. Her dissertation was titled "Influence of ultraviolet radiation on the in vitro histamine release of peripheral mononuclear leukocytes."

Eberlein started her post-doctoral training in the Institute for Clinical and Molecular Virology at Friedrich-Alexander-University Erlangen-Nürnberg in 1990, and then worked as a Doctor in Internship and Assistant Doctor in the Department of Dermatology of LMU Munich from 1992 to 1996. Later she was an assistant doctor at the Department of Dermatology and Allergy Biederstein, Technical University of Munich from 1996 to 2003 and completed her habilitation on "Parameters of UVB radiation sensitivity in humans: in vitro and in vivo models for testing photosensitizing and photoprotective substances" at the Department of Dermatology and Allergy Biederstein in 2000. She held appointment as a Senior Physician in the photodermatological unit, the unit for soft X-ray therapy as well as in the outpatient and inpatient area in 2004, and as a professor at the Department of Dermatology and Allergy in Biederstein in 2007.

Eberlein was chair (2019–2021), secretary (2017–2019) and board member (2015–2017) of the Interest Group of Allergy Diagnosis & Systems medicine (IGAD) at European Academy of Allergy and Clinical Immunology. She was lead organizer of the EUROBAT meetings in the years 2010, 2014, 2016, 2018, 2020, 2022, 2024.

== Research ==
Eberlein's research is primarily focused on cellular in vitro diagnostics, photodermatology, earlier in skin-physiological investigations, and environmental health disorders.

=== Cellular in vitro diagnostics ===
Eberlein focused in her studies on the use of basophil activation tests for questions on insect venom allergy, in particular to identify the clinically relevant insect in unclear cases. In addition, food allergy and in particular the alpha-gal syndrome was the subject of her investigations with the basophil activation test, which gave indications of the clinical relevance and served for the risk assessment of alpha-gal-containing drugs including vaccines. In her paper published in 2022, she provided a detailed analysis of the performance of cellular tests (basophil activation or basophil histamine release test) with different vaccines, PEGs of different molecular weights, as well as other PEGylated drugs, and highlighted the results in the context of COVID-19 vaccination of various working groups worldwide.

She demonstrated in a review the application of BAT as a complementary to skin tests and sIgE and has regarded basophil activation test (BAT) as a powerful tool and sensitive marker that can be used to detect clinically relevant allergies, provide information on the severity of an allergic reaction, and monitor therapies.

=== Photodermatology ===
In her research regarding photosensitivity, Eberlein focused on the influence of photosensitizing substances and photoprotective substances such as antioxidants (vitamins C and E). Photosensitising properties of antimicrobials, food additives, fragrances, hypolipidemics, neuroleptic drugs, non-steroidal anti-inflammatory drugs, proton pump inhibitors, statins etc. were characterised in more detail together with Bernhard Przybilla's working group. In a recent review she highlightened the vemurafenib-induced photosensitivity exclusively caused by UVA irradiation.

While exploring the role of ultraviolet A1 phototherapy in the treatment of localized scleroderma, she conducted a retrospective and prospective study and proved the efficacy of UVA1 phototherapy in these patients. In addition, the efficacy of UVA1 phototherapy in more than 200 patients with various skin diseases was retrospectively investigated.

=== Environmental health ===
Eberlein carried out experiments in environmental exposure chambers to investigate the influence of air humidity, pollutants and allergens on the physiology of human skin. Furthermore, she investigated effects of alpine mountain climate of Bavaria on atopic diseases with Heidrun Behrendt's and Johannes Ring's working group. Patients with environmental health disorders were characterized in more detail.

== Awards and honors ==
- 1990 – Clemens von Pirquet grant for the dissertation: "Influence of ultraviolet radiation on the in vitro histamine release of peripheral mononuclear leukocytes"
- 1991 – Grünenthal sponsorship award "Skin and Environment" for the work "Evidence of increased UV sensitivity in patients with malignant melanoma"
- 1994 – Grünenthal sponsorship award "Skin and Environment" for the work "Ultraviolet-A radiation induces adhesion molecule expression on human dermal microvascular endothelial cells."
- 1996 – Heinz Maurer Prize for Dermatological Research for the work "Change of skin roughness due to lowering air humidity in a climate chamber"
- 2013 – Almirall Dermatology Promotional Prize for the work "Double positivity to bee and wasp venom: improved diagnostic procedure by recombinant-allergen based IgE testing and basophil activation test including data about cross- reactive carbohydrate determinants"
- 2018 – DGAKI Young Talent Award for the work "The basophil activation test differentiates between patients with alpha-gal syndrome and asymptomatic alpha-gal sensitization"
