= Bernie Wijesekara =

- Born: 1930; Colombo, Sri Lanka
- Died: 1 October 2014 (aged 83–84); Colombo, Sri Lanka
- Education: Nalanda College, Colombo
- Occupation: Journalist
- Known for: Sports Journalism
- Spouse: Irene
- Children: Visakha, Harendra, Janaki

Bernie Wijesekara (1930 – 1 October 2014) was a senior sports journalist in Sri Lanka.

He received his secondary school education at Nalanda College in Colombo (largest city of Sri Lanka) before joining the Times of Ceylon as a junior sports journalist. Wijesekara then worked for the Daily News and subsequently for the Sunday Observer.

Wijesekara was honoured with a 'Life time Service award for Cricket' journalism by Dialog Sri Lanka awards ceremony.

He covered the inaugural (Prudential) Cricket World Cup held in England in 1975. He was also a Justice of the Peace.
