= Bernardine do Régo =

Beninese diplomat (1937–2024)

Bernardine do Régo (20 August 1937 – 20 December 2024) was a Beninese diplomat.

== Life ==
Bernardine do Régo was born on 20 August 1937 and educated in Dakar and Paris. She studied at the University of Paris from 1961 to 1963, and at the Institut des hautes études d'Outre-Mer (IHEOM) from 1962 to 1964. In 1964 she was appointed administrative and consular affairs director at the Republic of Dahomey's Ministry of Foreign Affairs. In 1970 she became technical consultant to the Office of the Presidency. After the 1972 Dahomeyan coup d'état she served as a diplomat in France, the United States, and as ambassador to Nigeria and was the first Beninese woman to hold the position of diplomat.

At the end of her life she retired in Cotonou.
