= Bernie Murray (camogie) =

Personal information
- Born: 1985 (age 40–41) Armagh, Northern Ireland

Sport
- Sport: Camogie
- Position: Midfield
Club*
Years	Club	Apps (scores)
	St Patrick's GFC, Cullyhanna	?
Inter-county**
Years	County	Apps (scores)
	Armagh	?
- * club appearances and scores correct as of (16:31, 30 June 2011 (UTC)). **Inter County team apps and scores correct as of (16:31, 30 June 2011 (UTC)).

Bernadette "Bernie" Murray (born 1985) is a Northern Irish sportswoman. She is a camogie player for Armagh GAA. She is also a teacher. She made her inter-county debut in 2003.

== History ==
Murray plays her club camogie for St Patrick's GFC, Cullyhanna. She made her camogie debut for Armagh in 2003. Until 2010, she had won two All Ireland Nancy Murray Cups, an Ulster senior championship and two Ulster intermediate championships. In 2010, she was awarded a Soaring Star award by the An Cumann Camogaiochta (Camogie Association). She was made captain of Armagh in 2011. In 2014, the Camogie Association of Ireland announced they were establishing an award for longevity and each GAA county were entitled to nominate a camogie player for this award. The Armagh county board announced that they were awarding their "Camogie Player of the Decade" to Murray. In 2015, she stepped away from county camogie for two months due to disillusionment. During her hiatus, she played gaelic football for Boston.

== Career ==
Murray is a teacher at St Patrick's High School, where she also taught Armagh teammates Ciara Hill, Catherine Beagan, Ella Mone, Eimear Smyth and Leah McGoldrick whilst playing alongside them in inter-county camogie. Together they reached the 2016 All-Ireland Junior Camogie Championship. Though Armagh were unsuccessful in the final, Murray won a Junior Soaring Star.
