= Dorothy Kisaka =

Ugandan lawyer and corporate executive

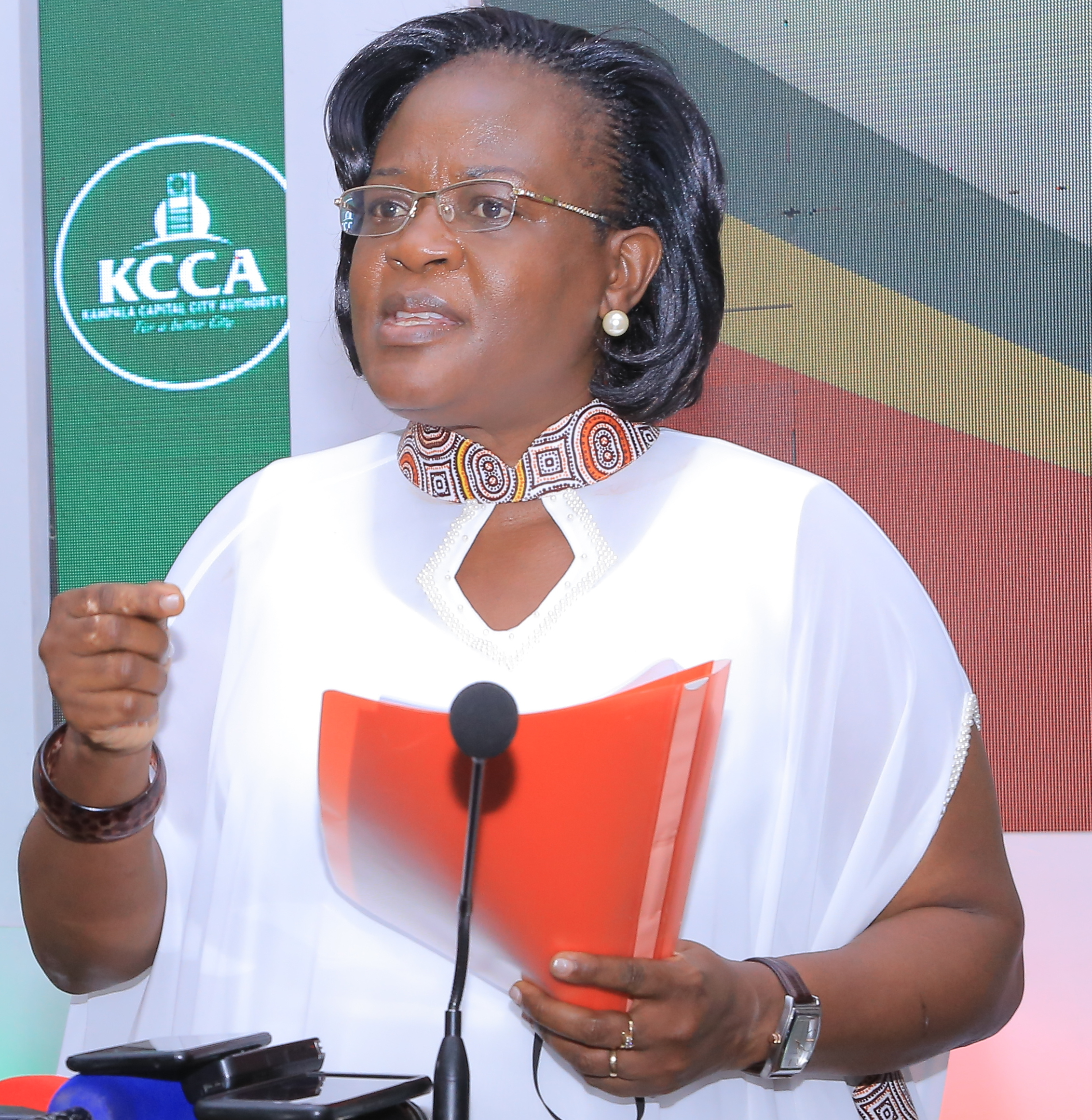

Executive Director of Kampala Capital City Authority
- In office 31 July 2020 – 24 September 2024
- Appointed by: Yoweri Museveni
- Preceded by: Andrew Kitaka
- Succeeded by: Sharifah Buzeki

Personal details
- Born: 1964 (age 61–62) Uganda
- Citizenship: Ugandan
- Education: Bachelor of law; Master of arts
- Alma mater: Makerere University (LLB); Law Development Centre (Diploma in Legal Practice); Uganda Christian University (MAOL); York St John University (MALIC)
- Occupation: Lawyer
- Profession: Lawyer, corporate executive, public administrator
- Known for: Leadership at KCCA

Dorothy Kisaka is a Ugandan lawyer and corporate executive who was appointed as the executive director of Kampala Capital City Authority, on 12 June 2020. She replaced Jennifer Musisi, the founding executive director of KCCA, who resigned on 15 December 2018, and engineer Andrew Mubiru Kitaka, who was the acting executive director from December 2018 until June 2020. She was fired from the position of executive director of KCCA on 24 September 2024. This followed a report on her negligence leading to an accident where a garbage landfill on the outskirts of Kampala led to the death of many people.

== Early life and education ==
Kisaka was born in Uganda in 1964.In 1977-1983, she attended Gayaza High school before joining Makerere University where she graduated with a Bachelor of Laws degree in 1987. She followed that by obtaining a Diploma in Legal Practice from the Law Development Centre, also in Kampala. She was then admitted to the Uganda Bar.

Her second degree is a Master of Arts in Organisational Leadership and Management (MAOL), obtained from Uganda Christian University, in Mukono, Uganda. Her third degree is also a Master of Arts in Leading Innovation and Change (MALIC), awarded by York St John University, in the United Kingdom.

== Career ==
Immediately prior to her current appointment, Kisaka was a senior presidential advisor deployed as deputy head of the Prime Minister's Delivery Unit in the Office of the Prime Minister. From 1999 until 2014, she was an associate attorney at Kiyimba—Kisaka & Company Advocates, based in Kampala.

In April 2020, Yoweri Museveni, the president of Uganda, appointed Kisaka as secretary of the COVID-19 Response Fund. Following interviews with the Uganda Ministry of Public Service, she assumed office as the second substantive executive director of KCCA. She was sworn in as the executive director of KCCA on 31 July 2020.

== Other considerations ==
Kisaka served as the executive director at Destiny Consult from March 2001 until December 2014. This is a leadership school which she co-founded in 2001.

From October 2010 until December 2014, Kisaka served as a commissioner at the Electoral Commission of Uganda. She was then appointed as a presidential advisor and subsequently a senior presidential advisor. She currently serves as the chairperson of Development Associates International, and represents Africa on the board of Haggai International.
