= Bernadine =

Bernadine is a female given name, a variant spelling of Bernardine. Notable people with the name include:

- Bernadine Bezuidenhout (born 1993), New Zealand cricketer
- Bernadine Craft, American politician from Wyoming
- Bernadine Custer (1900–1991), American artist
- Bernadine Hayes (1912–1987), American singer and actress
- Bernadine Healy (1944–2011), American cardiologist
- Bernadine Jayasinghe, TV personality, winner of a president's award and leading soft skills trainer
- Bernadine Kent, American politician from Ohio
- Bernadine Newsom Denning (1930–2011), American educator and civil rights activist
- Bernadine Oliver-Kerby (born 1971), New Zealand broadcaster
- Bernadine Wardana (born 2006), Indonesian badminton player

== See also ==
- Bernardino of Siena (1380-1444), Italian saint sometimes spelled Bernadine
- Bernardine (disambiguation)
- Bernard
- Bernie (given name)
- Bernardine (song), a song by Pat Boone from the 1957 film Bernardine, often misspelled Bernadine
- Nadine (disambiguation)
