= Bernadette Meyler =

American teacher

Bernadette Meyler is the Carl and Sheila Spaeth Professor of Law at Stanford Law School, where she has taught since 2013. Meyler's scholarship focuses on British and American constitutional law, the history of the common law, and the intersection of law and the humanities.

== Education ==
Meyler received her A.B. in Literature from Harvard College in 1995 and her Ph.D. in English from the University of California, Irvine, in 2006. She received her J.D. from Stanford Law School in 2003. At Stanford, Meyler was a research assistant to Dean Kathleen M. Sullivan and an editor of the Stanford Law Review, for which she won the President’s Award for Extraordinary Vision on Behalf of and Dedication to the Stanford Law Review.

Meyler, a classical violinist, also trained at the Juilliard School.

== Career ==
Following her graduation from law school, Meyler clerked for Judge Robert A. Katzmann of the U.S. Court of Appeals for the Second Circuit. She then joined the faculty of Cornell Law School, where she founded the nation's first Law & Humanities Colloquium. At Cornell, Meyler also taught in the English Department, and in 2009, she received the Provost’s Award for Distinguished Scholarship.

In 2007, Meyler was faculty in residence at UCLA School of Law, and from 2009 to 2010, she was the Mellon/LAPA Fellow in Law and the Humanities at Princeton University. Meyler joined the faculty of Stanford Law School in 2013, after serving as a visiting professor in 2011.

At Stanford, Meyler teaches courses on constitutional law, the Fourteenth Amendment, critical theories, and the intersection of law and the humanities. Meyler also teaches a course on the history of the common law, making Stanford one of the few law schools in the country to offer such a course.

== Publications ==
Meyler's scholarship has been published in numerous law journals, including the Stanford Law Review, Cornell Law Review, UCLA Law Review, Boston College Law Review, and Yale Journal of Law & the Humanities.

Meyler's books include Theaters of Pardoning (Cornell UP, 2019) and two co-edited volumes, New Directions in Law and Literature (Oxford UP, 2017) and The Oxford Handbook of Law and Humanities (Oxford UP, 2020). She is also completing Common Law Originalism, currently under contract with Yale University Press, and a textbook entitled Law and Literature: An Introduction, under contract with Palgrave Macmillan.
