= Sarah Broom Poetry Prize =

The Sarah Broom Poetry Prize is one of New Zealand's most valuable poetry prizes. It was established to celebrate the life and work of New Zealand poet Sarah Broom. The prize was first awarded in 2014.

== History ==
The Sarah Broom Poetry Prize was established to honour the life and work of Sarah Broom (1972–2013). Sarah Broom was a poet, Oxford graduate, university lecturer and mother of three children. She was the author of Tigers at Awhitu (Carcanet and AUP, 2010) and Gleam (AUP, 2013).

The prize was established by her husband, Michael Gleissner, and friends to remember her love of poetry, zest for life and spirit of imagination and determination and as a celebration of poetry in New Zealand.

In its first year, the Sarah Broom Poetry Prize attracted 300 entries. The winner was announced at the Auckland Writers Festival on 18 May 2014 and the prize was awarded to C K Stead (by video, in his absence) by guest judge Sam Hunt. The winning poems were described as "enormously diverse in their emotional range, from tender observations on his wife Kay, his neighbours, and the passing of time, to an acerbic and hilarious poem on the death of Derrida."

== Eligibility and conditions ==
The prize is awarded on the basis of an original collection of poems by a New Zealand resident or citizen.

The prize is open to emerging or established New Zealand poets.

Poets are required to submit six to eight poems (at least five unpublished).

The award carries a monetary prize. There is also a requirement for the winner to carry out readings and workshops in local schools, as a way of widening the reach of poetry into the community and continuing the poetic legacy of Sarah Broom.

== List of winners by year ==
2014

Winner: C.K. Stead.

Other finalists: Emma Neale, Kirsti Whalen.

2015

Winner: Diana Bridge.

Other finalists: Alice Miller, Ashleigh Young.

2016

Winner: Elizabeth Smither.

Other finalists: Airini Beautrais, Amanda Hunt.

2017

Winner: Hera Lindsay Bird.

Other finalists: Sandi King, Cliff Fell.

2018

Winner: Jane Arthur.

Other finalists: Stuart Airey, Wes Lee, Robyn Maree Pickens.

2019

Winner: Jessica Le Bas.

Other finalists: Nina Mingya Powles, Michael Steven.

2020

No award made.

== See also ==
- List of New Zealand literary awards
