= Berni =

Berni may refer to:

== People ==
=== Given name ===
- Berni Álvarez (born 1971), Spanish basketball player
- Berni Collas (1954–2010), Belgian politician
- Berni Flint (born 1952), British singer and songwriter
- Berni Goldblat, Swiss-Zimbabwean filmmaker and critic
- Berni Huber (born 1967), German Olympic alpine skier
- Berni Searle (born 1964), South African artist who works with photography, video, and film
- Berni Stapleton, Canadian writer
- Berni Tamames (born 1973), Spanish basketball player

=== Surname ===
- Berni (surname)

== Other ==
- Berni Inn, a chain of British steakhouses
- Jacob Berni House, Alma, Wisconsin
- Poggio Berni, a frazione (kind of subdivision of municipality) of Italy
- Bernard (TV series), known as Berni in Spain

== See also ==
- Bern (disambiguation)
- Berne (disambiguation)
- Bernie (disambiguation)
- Berny (disambiguation)
- Bernhard, a given name
