= Berna (disambiguation) =

Berna was a Swiss company that manufactured buses and trucks.

Berna may also refer to:

- Berna (Madrid Metro), a railway station in Madrid, Spain
- Don Berna (born 1961), Diego Fernando Murillo Bejarano, Colombian drug trafficker and paramilitary leader
- Berna (footballer) (born 2003), Bernardo Silva Conceição, Angolan footballer
- 1313 Berna, background asteroid from the Eunomian Region
- Berna (watch brand), defunct watch manufacturer
- Berna (name)

== See also ==
- Bernas
- Bern (disambiguation)
- Bernie (disambiguation)
