= Welsh Italians =

Welsh people of Italian descent

Italo-gallesi (Italian) Cymry Eidalaidd (Welsh)
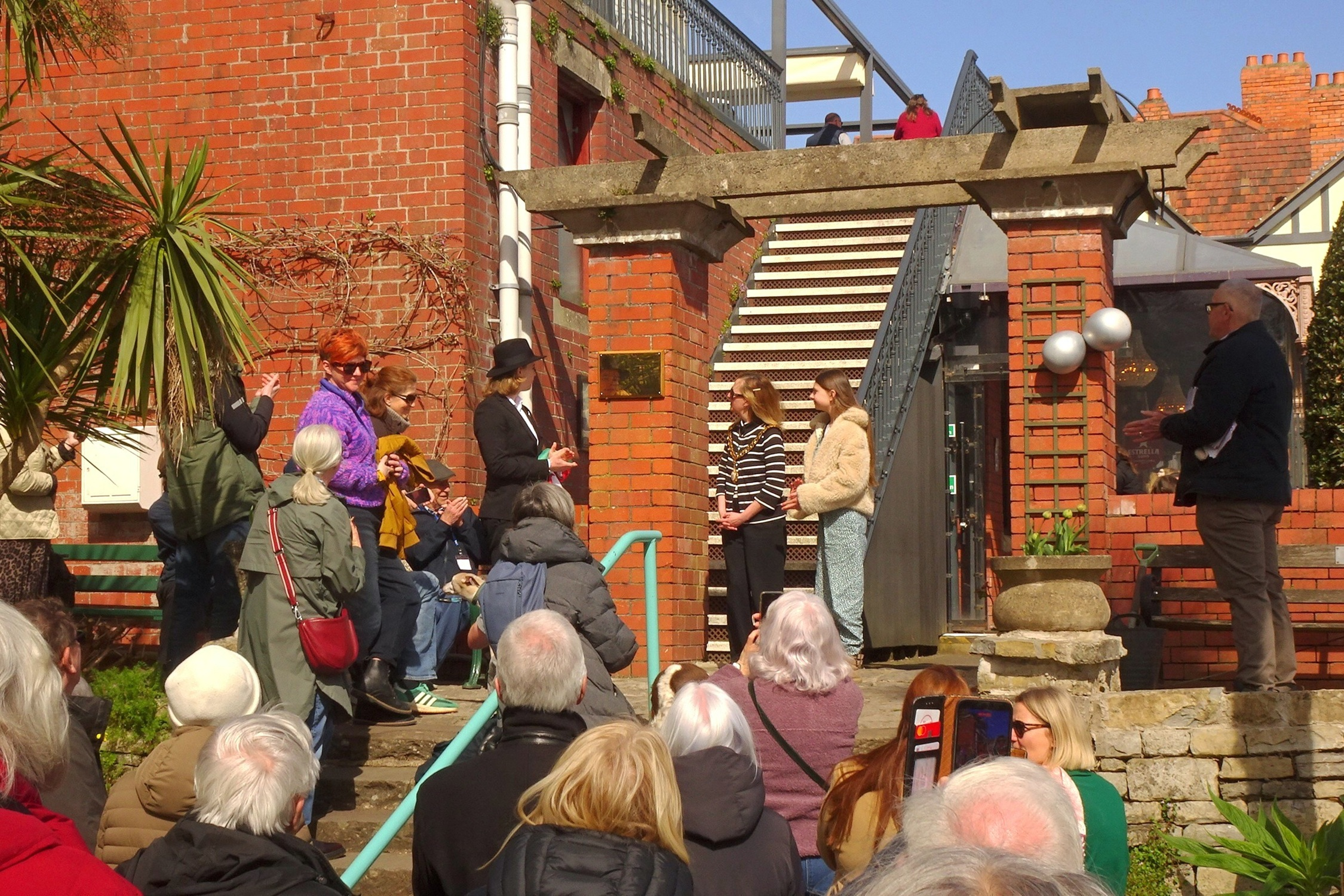
- Centenary event for the Italian Gardens, Penarth

Total population
- c. 20,000 (by birth) c. 40,000 (by ancestry)

Regions with significant populations
- South Wales

Languages
- Welsh; British English; Italian and Italian dialects

Religion
- Christian: Mostly Roman Catholic

Related ethnic groups
- Italians, Italians in the United Kingdom, Italian Scots, Welsh, Genoese in Gibraltar, Italian Americans, Italian Australians, Italian Canadians, Italian New Zealanders, Italian South Africans

Welsh Italians (Italian: italo-gallesi; Welsh: Cymry Eidalaidd) are Welsh who are fully or partially of Italian descent, whose ancestors were Italians who emigrated to Wales during the Italian diaspora, or Italian-born people in Wales. Most Italian immigration to Wales took place in the 19th and early 20th centuries, with the largest number of migrants settling in Glamorgan and Newport.

== Migration history ==
Italian immigrants to Wales, mainly originating from the Apennine Mountains and in particular the town of Bardi, established a network of cafés, ice cream parlours and fish and chip shops in Wales from the 1890s onwards. In the Rhondda Valley the cafés became known as "Bracchis" after an early café owner. The number of Italian cafés in Wales was more than 300 before World War II. Eleven of these are still run by the same families. The brothers Frank and Aldo Berni, who started in business in Merthyr Tydfil, went on to found the Berni Inn chain. Ystrad Mynach has seen many Italian cafes over the years, owned by families such as Lusardi, Massari, Bracchi and Sidoli. The last Italian cafe in the town, John's Cafe, was owned by the Sidoli family and closed in 2017 after over 50 years of trading.

During the Second World War, Welsh Italians without British citizenship were declared enemy aliens and a number were interned on the Isle of Man or in Canada. 53 Welsh Italians lost their lives in the sinking of the passenger ship Arandora Star in 1940. A memorial was placed in Cardiff Metropolitan Cathedral in 2010 to commemorate the tragedy. A memorial chapel is in the cemetery in Bardi.

In 1911 there were 20,389 Italians in Wales. As of 2012 is estimated now that there are 40,000 people of Italian origin living in Wales.

== Notable people ==
- Boxer Joe Calzaghe
- Member of Parliament for Gower, Tonia Antoniazzi
- Actor Victor Spinetti and his brother Henry
- Boxer Enzo Maccarinelli
- Chef Angela Hartnett
- Musician Pino Palladino
- Footballers David D'Auria and Donato Nardiello
- Rugby players Robert and Peter Sidoli, Theo Bevacqua, Ben Cambriani, James Ratti
- Artist Andrew Vicari
- Chef Michael Bonacini
- BBC News presenter Nick Servini

== In popular culture ==
The BBC broadcast a two part documentary about Welsh-Italians. It was presented by Michela Chiappa (Welsh, born in Merthyr Tydfil, but of Welsh-Italian parents) who went to visit Bardi. Café owner Bella Lasagne from Fireman Sam is an Italian citizen living in Wales.

== See also ==
- Italian migration to Britain
- Immigration to the United Kingdom
- Italian diaspora
- Italians in the United Kingdom
- Italian Scots
- Genoese in Gibraltar
