= Prawn cocktail, steak and Black Forest gateau =

British dinner menu

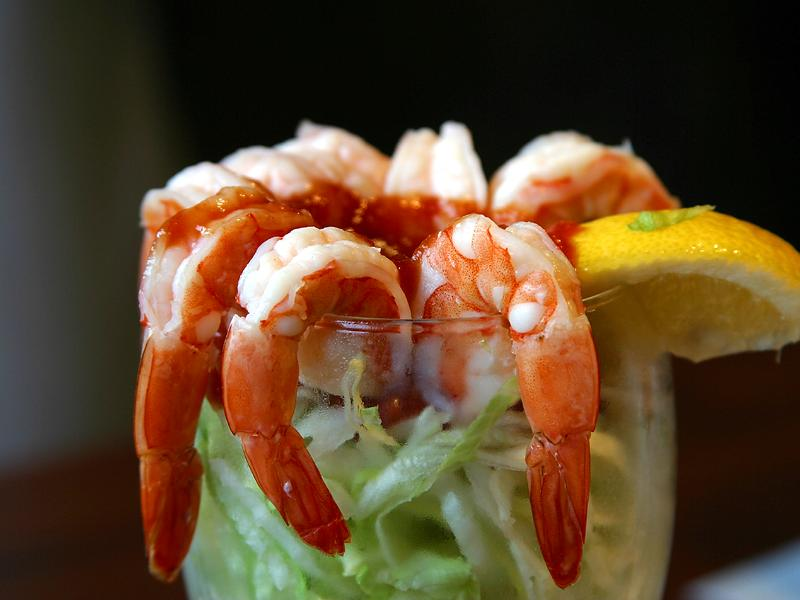
Prawn cocktail

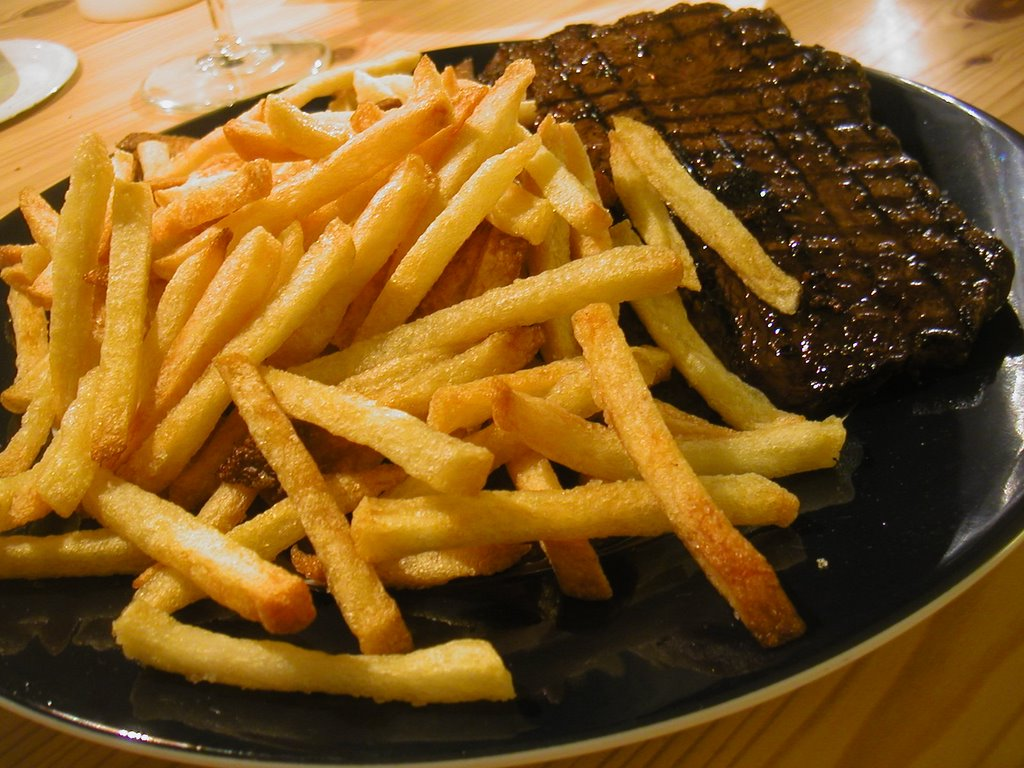
Steak and chips

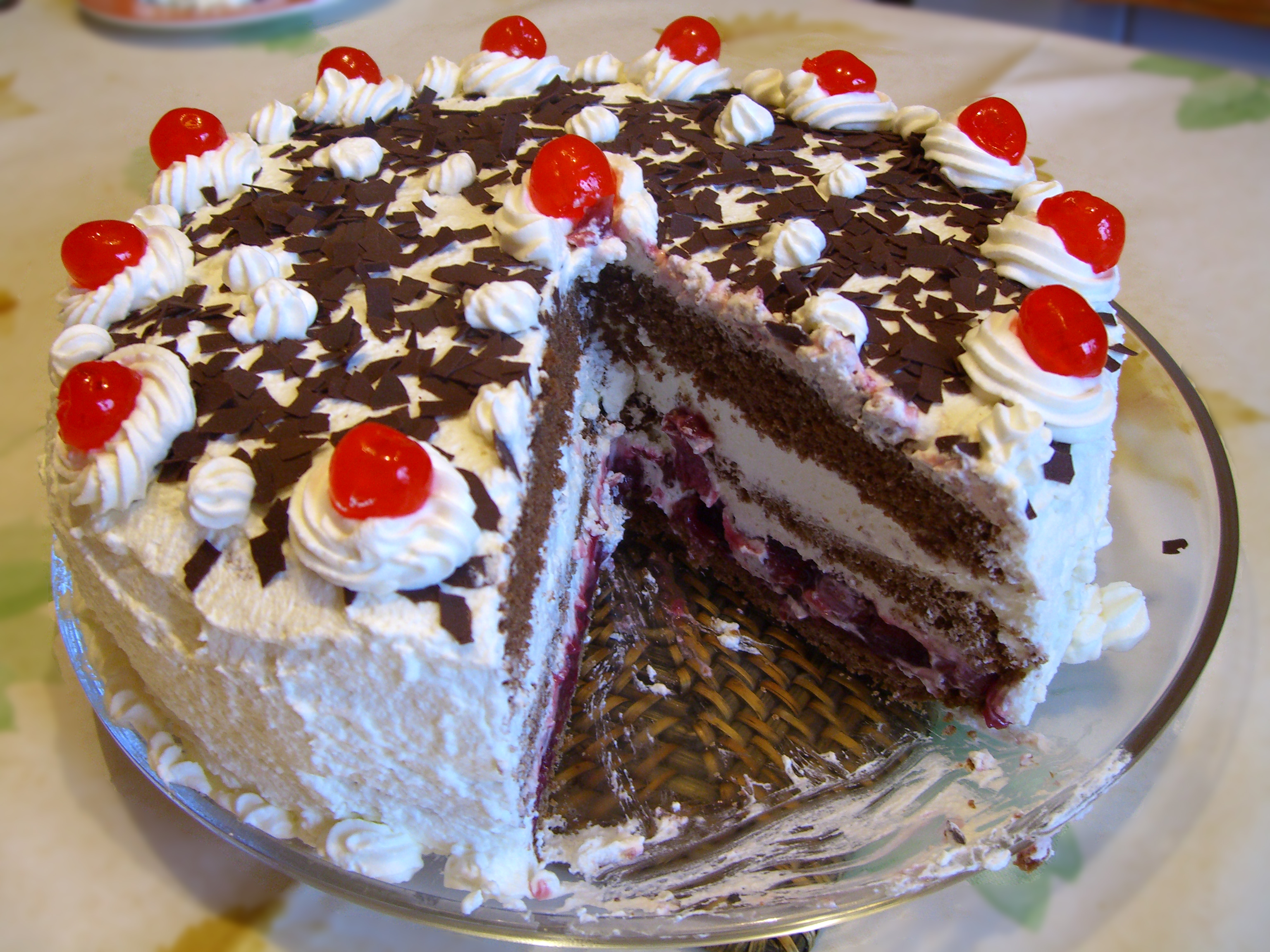
Black Forest gâteau

Prawn cocktail, steak garni with chips, and Black Forest gâteau was the most popular dinner menu in British restaurants in the 1980s, according to contemporary surveys by trade magazine Caterer and Hotelkeeper. It was associated with the Berni Inn chain, which popularised mass-market dining out after the end of food rationing in Britain following the Second World War. The Prawn Cocktail Years, by Simon Hopkinson and Lindsey Bareham, called this meal the Great British Meal Out.

== Background ==
Laura Mason in Food Culture in Great Britain wrote that "In mid-twentieth-century Britain, eating out had a dreadful image. Badly served, poor and unimaginative food, discourteous staff, and dining rooms with limited and inconvenient hours." Food rationing, introduced during the Second World War, did not end until 1954 and the range of eating-out options and variety of meals available remained limited, only gradually expanding through the 1950s and 60s.

== Meal ==
The Great British Meal Out was designed to appeal to those for whom eating out was unusual, and for whom a prawn cocktail, steak garni, or gateau were exotic foreign food. Nigel Slater wrote of his childhood in the 1970s: "As a family, we never went out for dinner unless we were on holiday, but there were occasional Saturday lunches at the local Berni Inn" adding "Steak garni always sounded so much more exotic than plain steak."

The standardised menu suited restaurant management, which could purchase and prepare food in bulk within tight cost controls. It also spared customers the potential embarrassment latent in having to select among unfamiliar foods with hard-to-pronounce names. Each course had a pleasantly sophisticated ring: a "cocktail" of prawns; "steak garni" rather than just steak; and "Black Forest gâteau" rather than just cake – all slightly foreign but easy enough to learn for next time, allowing diners to feel that they were enjoying a "continental" (European) eating experience.

The meal eventually became unfashionable as British dining tastes became more sophisticated from the 1980s onwards and the Gallup survey conducted by the trade magazine Caterer and Hotelkeeper in 1989 confirmed that Black Forest gâteau had suddenly become less popular. Simon Hopkinson and Lindsey Bareham coined the term "Great British Meal" in their 1997 book The Prawn Cocktail Years, which includes a chapter titled The Great British Meal Out. They wrote that, "cooked as it should be, this much derided and often ridiculed dinner is still something very special indeed".

== Association with Berni Inns ==
The meal became associated with the Berni Inn chain, established 1955 and which had 147 hotels and restaurants by 1970, making it the largest food chain outside the United States. The chain prospered by offering a menu with a limited number of options in "Olde Worlde" style restaurants that looked much the same in every branch. The most popular meal at a "Berni", even as late as the 1980s, remained prawn cocktail, steak and chips, and Black Forest gâteau.

In their 2000 obituary of Frank Berni, The Guardian made reference to "the Briton's favourite menu of prawn cocktail, steak and Black Forest gâteau". The Bristol Post noted that, by the 1980s, the Berni format was starting to look dated and "By then, Berni Inns were becoming popular shorthand for naff – prawn cocktail starter, steak & chips main, Black Forest gâteau for dessert". The Berni Inn chain was sold to Whitbread in 1990 and became the Beefeater chain.

In 2013, The Times reported on the bankruptcy of the Scotch Steak Houses chain earlier that year, which it cast as latter day Berni Inns. The paper wrote that "for three decades [the owner] has run restaurants where time – and quality – appeared to stand still. While his rivals sought to keep pace with consumer tastes, Ali Salih's Aberdeen, Highland and Angus steakhouses continued to serve prawn cocktail, steak and Black Forest gâteau to diners seated on velour banquettes as they quaffed Blue Nun."

== See also ==
- British cuisine
- Chicken in a basket
- Sunday roast
