= Bern (surname) =

Bern is a surname, and may refer to:

- Alan Bern (born 1955), American composer, pianist and activist in Berlin
- Arthur La Bern (1909–1990), British journalist, novelist and screenwriter
- Clementine Bern-Zernik (1905–1996), Austrian lawyer and librarian
- Dan Bern (born 1965), American guitarist, singer and songwriter
- Ivar Bern (born 1967), Norwegian chess player
- Karl Stauffer-Bern (1857–1891), Swiss painter, etcher and sculptor
- Lars Bern, (born 1942), Swedish engineer and author
- Liam Bern (born 2003), South African soccer player
- Maximilian Bern (1849–1923), German writer and editor
- Mina Bern (1911–2010), Polish-American actress, Yiddish theater star
- Paul Bern (1889–1932), German-American film director, screenwriter and producer
- Pauline Bern (born 1952), New Zealand jeweller
- Sarah Bern (born 1997), English rugby union footballer
- Stéphane Bern (born 1963), French-Luxembourgish journalist, radio host and television presenter
- Zvi Bern (born 1960), American theoretical physicist

== See also ==
- Berne (surname)
- Berns (surname)
