= Berney (surname) =

Berney is a surname, and may refer to:

- Antonio Berney (died 1784), French teacher in Chile
- Arthur Berney (1930–2020), American legal scholar
- Bob Berney (born 1953), American independent film executive
- Horatio Berney-Ficklin (1892–1961), British Army officer
- Jim Berney, American visual effects artist
- John Berney (died 1782), English Anglican priest, Archdeacon of Norwich
- Jon Berney (born 1976), Australian rower
- Leonard Berney (1920–2016), British soldier
- Lou Berney (born 1964), American crime fiction author
- Richard Berney (1674–c.1738), English politician

== See also ==
- Berny (surname)
- Berni (surname)
- Birney (surname)
