= Turkish Boxing Federation =

Boxing organization in Turkey

Turkish Boxing Federation Türkiye Boks Federasyonu
- Sport: Boxing
- Abbreviation: TBF
- Founded: 1924
- Affiliation: International Boxing Association (AIBA); European Boxing Confederation (EUBC)
- Headquarters: Çankaya
- President: Suat Hekimoğlu

Official website
- www.turkboks.gov.tr
- (Turkey)

Turkish Boxing Federation (Turkish: Türkiye Boks Federasyonu) is the governing body of amateur boxing sport in Turkey. It was formed in 1924. The headquarters is located in Çankaya district of Ankara. It is a member of the International Boxing Association (AIBA) and the European Boxing Confederation (EUBC), formerly European Amateur Boxing Association (EABA).

It organizes leagues, tournaments and championships for all age groups of both genders at national level. In addition, support services like the education of referees and coaches are within its duties. Participations of Turkish amateur boxing teams at all international competition events are organized by the federation.

== History ==
Boxing sport began in Turkey as an activity at individual level. Boxing competitions carried out by foreign soldiers during the occupation of Istanbul between 1918 and 1923 made this sport popular that spread fast. The first boxing club was established by the Ottoman Jew Aksiyani Efendi under the licence of the French Boxing Federation in the 1920s. This followed by boxing sections established by footballers of major clubs such as Fenerbahçe S.K., Galatasaray S.K. and Kurtuluş SK.

The Turkish Boxing Federation was established in 1924, and was admitted to the AIBA in 1927. Eşref Şefik (1894–1980) was appointed the first president of the organization, which governed amateur boxing sport only. In 1928, Turkey's first national team was formed, which achieved its first success in the USSR the same year.

Melih Açba started a new era in Turkish boxing as he won 358 of his 359 fights, and became the Golden Gloves champion in the United States in 1940. He presided the federation from 1942 until 1949.

After a brief period of carrying out its function under the umbrella of Turkish Wrestling Federation, the Boxing Federation attained its independent status in 1942.

== International events hosted ==
- 1993 European Amateur Boxing Championships, September 6–12 Bursa
- 2002 Women's World Amateur Boxing Championships, October 21–27 Antalya
- 2004 World University Boxing Championship, November 22–29 Antalya
- 2011 European Amateur Boxing Championships, June 17–24 Ankara
- 2012 European Boxing Olympic Qualification Tournament, April 15–21 Trabzon

== See also ==
- Akkan Suver
- Female boxing referees:
  - Berna Yurtsever,
  - Ebru Koç,
  - Yasemin Us.
