= Bern (disambiguation) =

Bern (or Berne) is the capital of Switzerland.

Bern or Berne may also refer to:

== Places ==
=== Germany ===
- Berne, Germany, a town in Lower Saxony
- Berne, Hamburg, former village which became a quarter of Hamburg

=== Italy ===
- Verona, Italy, a city called Bern in Middle High German

=== Netherlands ===
- Bern (Netherlands), a hamlet in Gelderland

=== Switzerland ===
- Canton of Bern, of which Bern is the capital
- Bern (district), the city's administrative district in the Canton of Bern

=== United States ===
- Bern, Idaho
- Berne, Indiana
- Berne, Iowa
- Bern, Kansas
- Berne, Michigan
- Berne, Minnesota
- Berne, New York
- Berne, Pennsylvania
- Bern Township, Pennsylvania
- Bern Township, Ohio
- Berne Township, Ohio
- Bern, Wisconsin

== People ==
- Bern, a nickname or short form for the given names Bernard, Bernadette, and Bernadine.

=== Given name ===
- Bern Brostek (born 1966), American professional football player
- Bern Shanks (born 1940), American environmental scientist, educator, public administrator, outdoorsman, conservationist, and author
- Bern Nadette Stanis (born 1953), American actress and author

=== Surname ===
- Bern (surname)
- Dietrich von Bern (454–526), name in German legend for Theodoric the Great, king of the Ostrogoths
- Berne (surname)

== Other uses ==
- Bern Convention (or Berne Convention), shorthand for the Berne Convention on the Conservation of European Wildlife and Natural Habitats, also known as the Bern Convention (or Berne Convention), a binding international legal instrument in the field of Nature Conservation
- Berne Convention, shorthand for the Berne Convention for the Protection of Literary and Artistic Works, an international agreement governing copyright
- The Kingdom of Bern in the video game Fire Emblem: The Binding Blade
- Bern (album), a 2026 live album by Roy Hargrove

== See also ==
- Berne (disambiguation)
- Bernie (disambiguation)
  - Bernie (given name)
- Berny (disambiguation)
- Burn (disambiguation)
