= Berna (name) =

Male given name

- Gender: Unisex

Other names
- Related names: Bernardo, Bernardette

Berna is a unisex given name or surname. It may also refer to:

== First name ==
- Berna Eli Oldfield (1878–1946), American racing driver
- Berna Carrasco (1914–2013), Chilean chess master
- Berna Huebner (born 1941), American philanthropist and film director
- Berna Bevilacqua (1950–1996), Argentine pianist
- Berna Laçin (born 1970), Turkish actress
- Berna Dengiz (fl. 1974-present), Turkish industrial engineer and university dean and professor
- Berna Gözbaşı (born 1974), Turkish businesswoman and sports executive
- Berna Yeniçeri (born 1996), Turkish football defender
- Berna Yurtsever, Turkish boxing referee
- Berna (footballer) (born 2003), Bernardo Silva Conceição, Portuguese football attacking midfielder

== Last name ==
- Tell Berna (1891–1975), American middle and long-distance runner
- Emil Berna (1906–2000), Swiss cinematographer
- Paul Berna (1908–1994), French children's book writer
- Bobby Berna (born 1961), Filipino boxer
- Dominique Berna (born 1964), French judoka
- Ricardo Berna (born 1979), Brazilian football goalkeeper
- Eva Berná (born 1986), Czech Paralympic shotputter
- Carlos Berna (born 1990), Colombian weightlifter
- Phil Berna (born 1996), Canadian rugby sevens player
- Justin Berna (fl. 2002–present), American football player and coach
