= Berni (surname) =

Italian surname

Bèrni
- Language: Italian

Origin
- Derivation: Abbreviated version of Bernardi, itself probably originated from Bernardo, Bernard or Bernhard
- Region of origin: Italy

Other names
- Variant forms: Bèrna; Berna; Bernè; Berne; Bèrno; Berno
- Derivatives: Bernich; Bernic; Bèrnič

Bèrni or Berni is an Italian surname, may refer to:

- Aldo Berni (1909–1997), Italian-born British restaurateur, brother of Frank. Co-founder of Berni Inn
- Ángel Berni (1931–2017), Paraguayan footballer
- Antonio Berni (1905–1981), Argentine figurative artist
- David Berni (born 1970), Canadian actor, voice actor, stand-up comedian and writer
- Francesco Berni (died 1535), Italian poet
- Franco Berni (born 1965), Italian rugby union player
- Frank Berni (1903–2000), Italian-born British restaurateur, brother of Aldo. Co-founder of Berni Inn
- Mara Berni (born 1932), Italian stage, television and film actress
- Tim Berni (born 2000), Swiss ice hockey player
- Tommaso Berni (born 1983), Italian footballer

== See also ==
- Berni (disambiguation)
