= Berny (surname) =

Berny or de Berny is a surname and may refer to:

- Charles Berny d'Ouvillé (1772–1856), French painter and miniaturist
- Gérard de Berny (1880–1957), French politician
- Maria Berny (born 1932), Polish politician

== See also ==
- Berney (surname)
