= Berne (disambiguation) =

Bern or Berne is the capital of Switzerland.

Berne may also refer to:

== Places ==
- Berne, Germany, a town in Lower Saxony, Germany
- Berne, Hamburg, Germany, a former village which became a quarter of Hamburg
  - Berne (Hamburg U-Bahn station), a station of Hamburg U-Bahn
- Berne (Ollen), a river of Lower Saxony, Germany, tributary of the Ollen
- Berne, Indiana, a city in Indiana, US
- Verona, Italy, "Bern" in Germanic legends such as the cycle of Dietric von Bern.

== People with the surname ==
- Berne (surname)

== See also ==
- Bern (disambiguation)
- Bernie (disambiguation)
- Berny
- Burn (disambiguation)
