= Olga Wohlbrück =

Austrian author and actress (1867-1933)

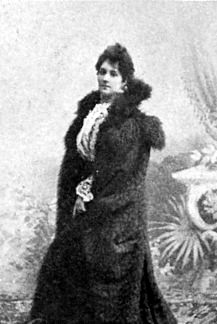
- Born: 5 July 1867; Gainfarn, Austria-Hungary
- Died: 20 July 1933 (aged 66); Berlin, Nazi Germany
- Occupation(s): Actress, director, writer
- Spouse(s): Maximilian Bern (divorced); Leo Feld (divorced); Waldemar Wendland
- Relatives: Anton Walbrook (cousin)

Olga Wohlbrück (5 July 1867 – 20 July 1933) was an Austrian-German actress, director, and writer. She is considered the first female director in Germany.

== Biography ==
Olga Wohlbrück was born in Austria in 1867 to Max and Olga Wohlbrück; her parents both came from acting families. She spent much of her childhood in Russia before moving to Germany and studying acting from her maternal grandmother.

She established a flourishing literary career for herself, producing novels, short stories, and plays while continuing to work as an actress in Berlin. In 1913, with the release of To Give a Girl Away (Ein Mädchen zu Verschenken), she became Germany's first female director. She wrote other scripts over the years, but that was her sole directorial effort.

She was married three times: first to writer Maximilian Bern, second to author Leo Feld, and third to composer Waldemar Wendland, and was related to Austrian actor Anton Walbrook (her second cousin).

== Selected filmography ==
- To Give a Girl Away (1913, script and direction)
- The Golden Belt (1913, script)
