= Berni Inn =

Defunct British restaurant chain

The Berni Inn logo

Berni Inn was a chain of British steakhouses established in 1955 by brothers Frank and Aldo Berni, who modelled the chain on restaurants they had seen in America. The restaurants introduced the postwar British public to its own home-grown restaurant chain, which came with stylised restaurants with Tudor-looking false oak beams and white walls.

By 1970 the chain comprised 147 hotels and restaurants, including the New Inn at Gloucester, the Mitre at Oxford and several in Japan. It was the largest food chain outside the US.

== History ==
Brothers Aldo and Frank Berni, with their partner Paul Rosse, opened the first Berni Inn on 27 July 1956 at The Rummer, a historic pub in St Nicholas Market in central Bristol. More outlets were opened, and the company went public in 1962. The chain offered slick service and value for money, achieved partly by offering only a limited meat-based menu and a relatively small wine list. It had a loyal and regular following and quickly expanded through the 1960s, first in Bristol and then through much of the rest of the country.

Unlike other restaurants, Berni Inns did not do their own butchery but bought in quality steaks already prepared. Behind the scenes, staff training manuals showed that they expected high standards from their employees.

The first female manager was Gerda Thut, who took over The Sawyer's Arms in Nottingham in the 1960s. This was noted as a progressive step in management and equality. The chain was sold to Grand Metropolitan for £14.5 million in 1970. Berni Inn was sold to Whitbread in 1995, who converted the outlets into their own Beefeater restaurants.

Aldo Berni died in 1997 at the age of 88 in Bristol. Frank died 10 July 2000, aged 96, in Jersey. Their brother Marco managed Harvey's Restaurant in Bristol in the 1960s.

== Fare ==
The most frequently ordered meal, even as late as the 1980s, was prawn cocktail, steak and Black Forest gateau. This is sometimes called the Great British Meal. As Simon Hopkinson and Lindsey Bareham noted in their 1997 book The Prawn Cocktail Years, "cooked as it should be, this much derided and often ridiculed dinner is still something very special indeed."

== In popular culture ==
In Ramsay's Kitchen Nightmares, Gordon Ramsay often referenced Berni Inns when discussing how dated restaurants' existing menus were. He visited a Berni Inn in the early 1980s, an experience he described as "hideous".
