= Akkan Suver =

Turkish journalist

President of Marmara Group Foundation
- Incumbent
- Assumed office 29 November 1997

Personal details
- Born: 18 September 1942 (age 84) Istanbul, Turkey
- Education: University of Istanbul

Akkan Suver (born 18 September 1942, in Istanbul, Turkey) is a Turkish journalist, author, academic and NGO leader. He is President of the Marmara Group Foundation.

== Background ==
Dr. Akkan Suver had his PhD degree obtained at the University of Istanbul. He was appointed to the Honorary Consul General of Montenegro on May 26, 2008. Dr. Suver is the President of Marmara Group Foundation, which is the most prestigious NGO's of Turkey since 1997. Dr. Akkan Suver is the founder of Eurasian Economic Summit, which has been continuously organized since 1998.

== Career ==
He started his journalistic career with the daily Son Saat.

He was the spokesman of the Nationalist Movement Party (MHP) between 1987 and 1995 and was then approved as the deputy secretary general of the MHP. In 1997, he made the decision to withdraw from his position and his political career.

He was the vice-president of the Turkish Boxing Federation and Member of the Scientific Committee of the World Boxing Association between 1990 and 2000.

In 1997, he became the President of the Marmara Foundation.

As an activist for intercultural dialogue, for twenty years he has organized "Love and Peace Dinners" every year during Ramadan, with the participation of Greek, Armenian, Syriac Patriarchs, President of Religious Affairs Directorate of Turkish Republic, Turkish Grand Rabbi, Representatives of Vatican, consuls general and ambassadors from many countries, and other guests from Turkey and around the world. For his works of intercultural dialogue, he was received by Pope Benedict XVI in Vatican. Also, for his major contributions during the Pope's visit, he received the "Memoriam Medal of Benedict XVI" in March 2007.

He serves as the member of Academic Council of the "[Atatürk Center]" in Azerbaijan. His books "Yellow Leaves Season" and "Living Atatürk" were published by this center in 2005 and 2006. Dr. Akkan Suver, having concerns for civil society, he once again took part in the Elections in Azerbaijan, Uzbekistan, Bulgaria, Kyrgyzstan, and Georgia as an 'Observer Statute’.

Dr. Suver is a well-known journalist and writer in Turkey.

== Recognition ==
Dr. Suver received Honorary Causa Doctorate from Azerbaijan Tefekkür University (2001), Honorary Causa Professorship from Kyrgyzstan Bishkek University (2010), and Honorary Doctorate from Romania Constanza Maritime University (2013).He was elected as the vice president of the "[World Mongolian Assembly]", which was organized in [Karakurum]. (2006.)

He is the Honorary Consul General of Montenegro in Istanbul, having been approved by the Government of the Republic of Montenegro on May 28, 2008.

He is the Vice-President and founding member of the "International Foundation for Cooperation and Partnership of the Black Sea and the Caspian Sea", which was inaugurated on March 4, 2009, in Bucharest, Romania. Azerbaijani President Ilham Aliyev and President Traian Băsescu of Romania were the Honorary Members of the organization.

== Awards ==
- Dr. Suver received the Pontificate Medal from Pope Benedict XVI due to his works on intercultural dialogue first in Turkey and then in international area, also Dostlug Orden and Terraki Medal from Azerbaijan, Genghis Khan Medal, Silver Star Medal and Polar Star Medal from Mongolia and 15th Year Medal, 20th Year Medal and Independence Medal from Moldova - Gagauzia.
- Dr. Akkan Suver, recognized by his endeavours in the area of Intercultural Dialogue, received Balkan Charter of Peace from Balkan Club of Peace on February 14, 2013.
- Dr. Akkan Suver was awarded with Jubile Medal by the organization of BSCSIF on 9 March 2014 in Bucharest.
- The most prestigious award "The Certificate for Decoration of Land of Gagauzia" presented to Dr. Akkan Suver in Moldova Gagauzia on 14 October 2014.
- Dr. Akkan Suver was given Romanian State Special Medal regarding the 25th Anniversary of fall of Communism, in Bucharest by the Prime Minister H.E. Victor Pota on November 20, 2014.
- Dr. Akkan Suver was rewarded by former Vice Chancellor of Austria H.E. Dr. Erhard Busek ‘’ Strategic Partner Award’ at Vienna Economic Forum on November 23, 2014.
- Dr. Akkan Suver was presented the ‘Turkish – Romanian Relations Award’ by the Romanian Ambassador to Ankara H.E. Radu Onofrei, on December 17, 2014.

At various platforms taking place in the same year, Dr. Suver conveyed the views of the Turkish Civil Society during his participation at the various international meetings in Azerbaijan, the People's Republic of China, Romania, Moldova, Gagauzia, Uzbekistan, Macedonia, Montenegro, Bulgaria and Albania.

In 2016, Dr. Suver organized and lead to the 19th Eurasian Economic Summit.

- By the Ministry of Energy of the Republic of Azerbaijan, Dr. Suver hold in high honor with the "Honorary Worker of Energy" Decoration.
- Dr. Suver was granted a Diploma of "Ambassador of Knowledge" by a Ljubljana-based organization, the Life Learning Academy.
- Dr. Akkan Suver, deemed worthy for the titles like journalist of the year, civil society leader of the years from many national and international institutions.
