= West End Watch Co. =

Swiss watch manufacturer

Société des Montres West End SA
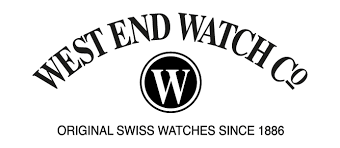
- Company type: Private company
- Industry: Watch manufacturing
- Founded: 1886 (by Arnold Amstutz and Constant Droz)
- Headquarters: Leytron (Valais), Switzerland
- Key people: Jérôme Monnat Jr. (CEO)
- Products: Automatic and quartz wristwatches
- Website: www.westendwatchco.ch

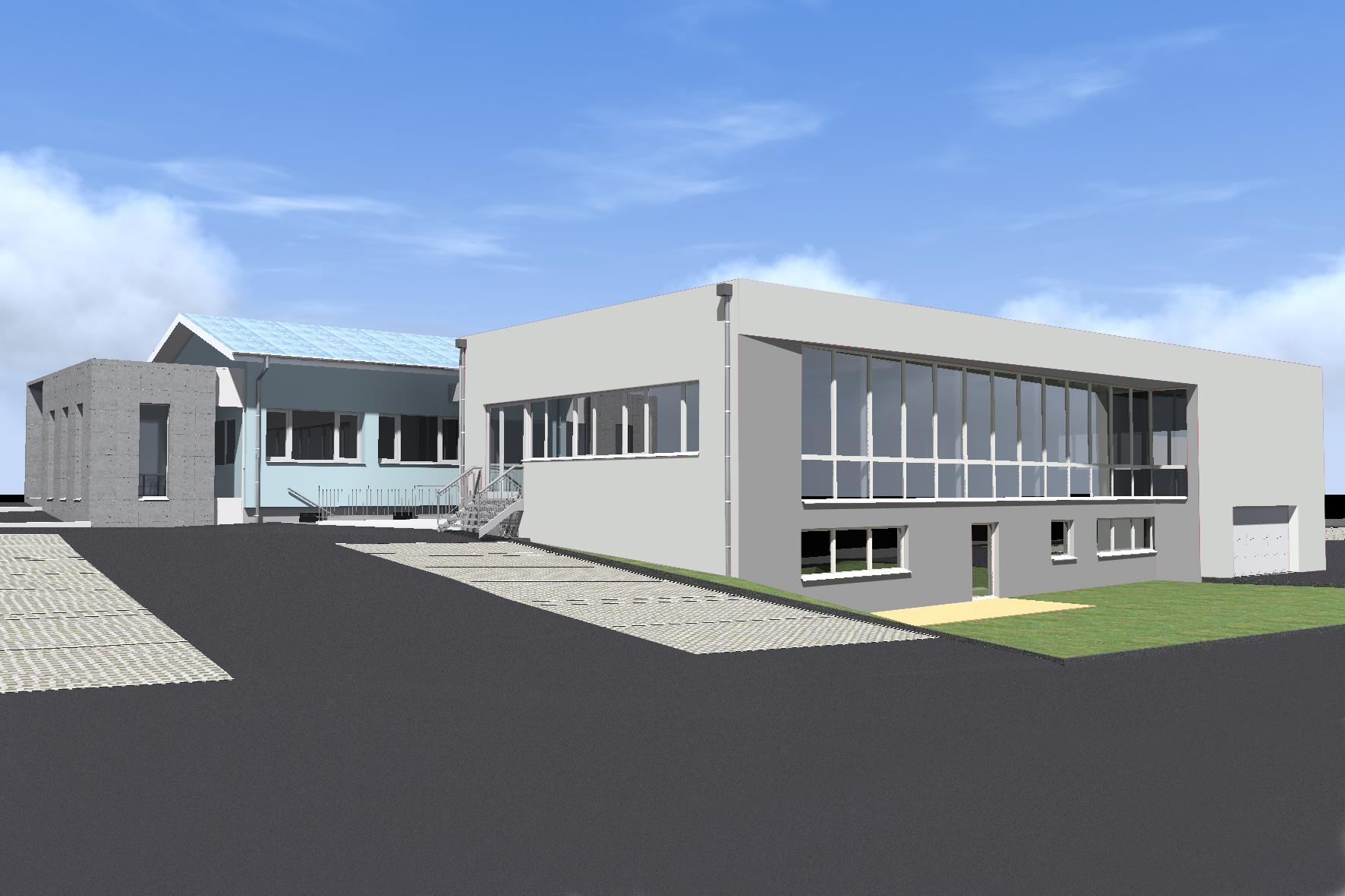
West End Watch Company headquarters

West End Watch Company is a manufacturer of watches located at Leytron (Switzerland). It was established in 1886 and has been in business for more than 120 years.

The company has produced and distributed more than 15 million watches worldwide since 1886.

== History ==
The West End Watch Company was created in 1886. The West End, a district of the centre of London, inspired its name to M. Arnold Charpié who was the Bombay representative of the Alcide Droz & Sons firm, a watch company established at Saint-Imier (Canton of Bern) in Switzerland.

In 1886, MM. Amstutz and Droz, the owner of Alcide Droz & Sons firm, began the exploitation of the trademark West End Watch Company in the Indian market and developed the first waterproof pocket watch ever produced: "L'Impermeable" (nowadays displayed at the International Watchmaking Museum of La Chaux-de-Fonds).

During the First World War, a large force of British and Indian soldiers was sent from Bombay to the Persian Gulf to reach Mesopotamia (modern-day Iraq). They received some West End Watch Company watches.

In 1917, the West End Watch Company changed its name to Société des Montres West End SA and was registered in Geneva. At the same time the sub-brand Sowar was also registered.

In 1934, the Société des Montres West End SA was the first brand to introduce the Incabloc anti-shock system invented by Mr. Braunschweig.

In 1973, after several years of development, the company was finally sold, for lack of heirs, to its main supplier, Aubry Brothers Ltd, established in Noirmont (Jura) to keep open the Bombay West End Watch Company's office.

Since 2000 the workshops and the head office of the company have been moved to Leytron, in Wallis. At the same time, the company was taken over by new shareholders and the management changed.

In 2005, the West End Watch Company celebrated its 120th anniversary of uninterrupted presence in Asia with the introduction of its "Silk Road concept". This concept came from the fact that the Silk Road crossed most of the regions where the brand possessed, and still possesses, counters.

Nowadays, West End Watch Company is active in Saudi Arabia, in the United Arab Emirates, in the Himalaya Range (in particular in Tibet, Nepal and in Bhutan), as well as in the western half of China.

In 2011, West End Watch Company celebrated 125 years of uninterrupted activity, so a commemorative book redrawing the history of the brand was published in 2010 in association with the Centre Jurassien d’Archives et de Recherches Economiques.

At the beginning of the 20th century West End Watch Company launched a model called the Sowar -the cavalryman- named after one of the elite troops of the Indian army. This name was selected in honour of Sir Thomas Edward Lawrence (Lawrence of Arabia) because it is said that he and his soldiers wore West End Watch Company watches during the war. The Sowar model is still manufactured today.

== Articles ==
- Ella Maillart mentions the presence of West End Watch Company watches in Western China in the 1930s in her book Forbidden Journey - From Peking to Cashmir (on page 252) : "He introduces us a robust Turki with blond beard whose 'West End Watch chronometer' features an inscription in which Aurel Stein expresses his thanks to Musa Ahoun, his interpreter."
