= L'impermeable =

First waterproof watch

L'impermeable is the name of one of the first waterproof watches invented in the 1880s and manufactured by Alcide Droz et Fils.

== Definition of epoxy waterproofing ==
Waterproof (or water-resistant) describes objects unaffected by water or resisting water passage, or which are covered with a material that resists or does not allow water passage.

In horology, the waterproofness of a watch is defined by its resistance under pressure. The manufacturers indicate mostly the degree of waterproofness in metres (m), feet (ft) or atmospheres (atm). Watches with the "waterproof" name, with or without indication of overpressure, have to be complied and have to undergo successfully the tests planned in the standard ISO-2281. These watches are intended for a current daily use and have to resist to the water during exercises such as the short-term swimming.

So finally watches said waterresistant must : resist to a dive in the water in a depth of at least 100 metres (330 ft), have a system of control of time and answer all the criteria planned by the standard ISO 6425: luminosity, shock resistance, resistance in magnetic fields, solidity of the bracelet.

== History ==
Alcide Droz et Fils, later known as the Berna and established in St-Imier in the Bernese Jura since 1864, developed the first attested waterproof watch, named L'Imperméable.

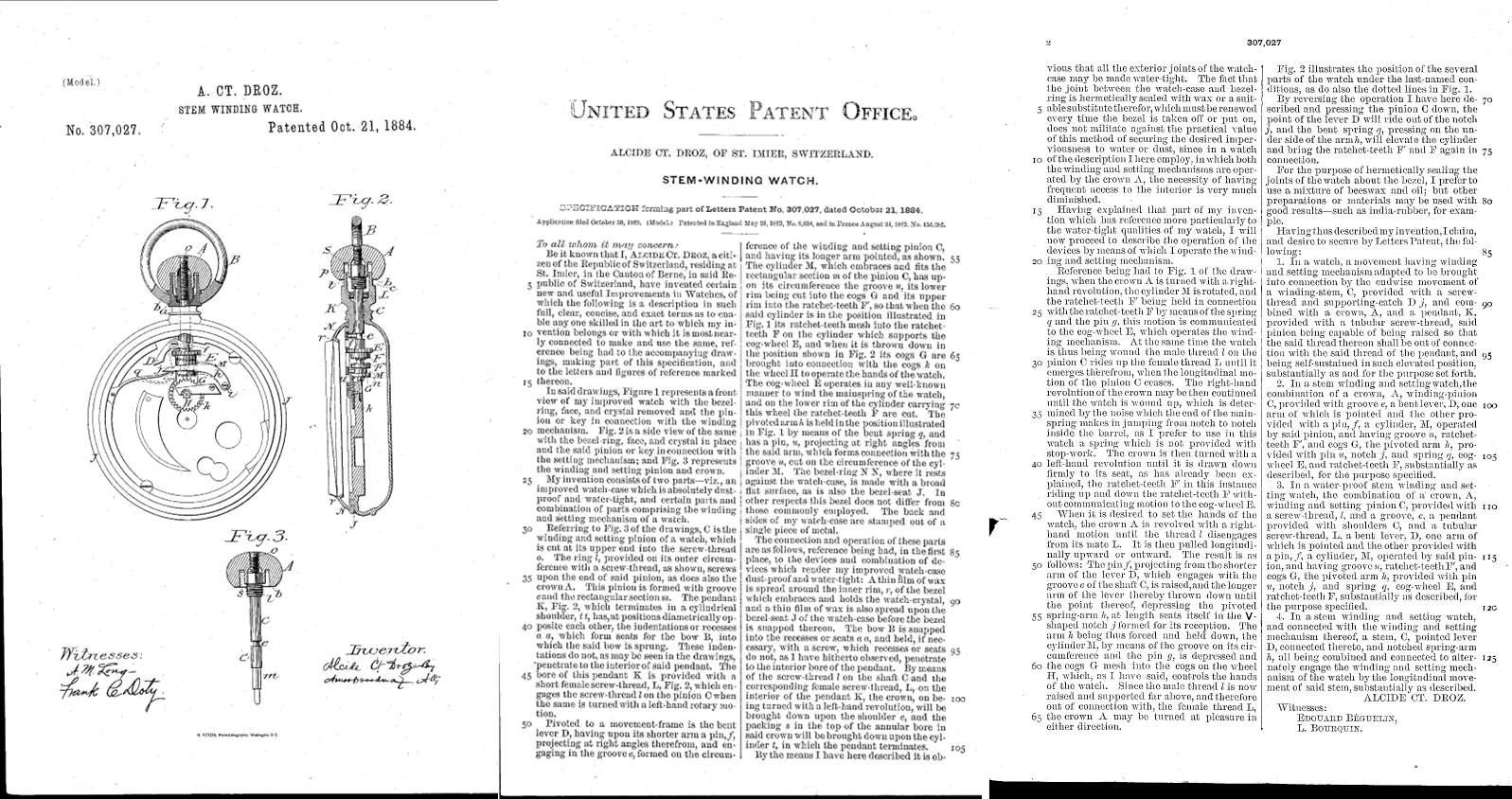
Patent of L’impermeable

They had the idea to place a seal in the crown of winder, which is screwed on the counterpart. "L'Impermeable" was born: it is the very first waterproof watch intended especially to protect the movement from dust and humidity.

This pocket watch is nowadays on display at the International Watchmaking Museum in La Chaux-de-Fonds.

== See also ==
- Berna (watch brand)
- West End Watch Co
- Waterproof
- Grail-Watch: Droz and Degoumois: Berna Watch Factory
- vintagewatchstraps.com
