= Berna Bevilacqua =

Argentine pianist

Berna Bevilacqua (20 August 1950 – 16 July 1996) was an Argentine pianist. In the late sixties, at the age of sixteen, he formed his own quartet called "Berna y su conjunto juvenil", which would become a pillar in the history of the Cordoba quartet.
