= Berna (watch brand) =

Swiss watchmaker

Berna logo

Berna Watch Co. was a Swiss watch brand and manufacturer based in Saint-Imier, in the Canton of Bern. Active from the 1860s until 1980, the company and its predecessors (Droz & Perret, Alcide Droz & Fils, and Droz & Cie) produced watches and chronographs.

== History ==
In the 1860s, watchmaker Alcide Droz of Saint-Imier, a historic center of Swiss watchmaking and chronograph production, partnered with Henri Perret to found Droz & Perret. The trademark Droz & Perret was registered in 1864. After Henri Perret left the partnership, the company was renamed Alcide Droz & Fils in 1883 and Droz & Cie. in 1887.

Berna's early production included chronographs and so-called "compteurs", referring to functional time-measuring instruments used in technical and sporting contexts.

In 1879, the company completed a new factory at Rue des Marronniers 20 in Saint-Imier (later renamed Rue Baptiste-Savoye 20). By the mid-1880s, Berna was being used as a brand name. According to historian Patrick Linder, the firm adopted the name Fabrique d'Horlogerie Berna S.A. (Ancienne Maison Droz & Cie) in 1905 and merged with Ernest Degoumois' workshop.

The firm entered liquidation proceedings briefly in 1908, but production continued under the management of Ernest Degoumois. Degoumois marketed watches under the Bonheur and High-Life names and moved their production to Berna's factory at Rue des Marronniers 20. His former workshop was later leased to Longines.

In September 1911, a labour dispute at the Berna Watch Co. factory in Saint-Imier led the workforce to strike, and the watchworkers' union urged its members not to accept work for the firm. An agreement was reached on 10 October; the workers returned on 11 October, and the union reported that employees were satisfied with the outcome. According to Foskett, this strike nearly drove Berna out of business.

According to contemporary union circulars, the Berna Watch dispute formed part of a broader wave of labour conflicts in the Jura watch industry, and similar boycott calls were issued against a number of other factories. These included firms such as Meyer & Stüdeli, Langendorf Watch Co, Schild Frères, Tavannes Watch Co. and Reconvilier.

By 1913, Berna was listed among the town's principal factories, at a time when watchmaking in Saint-Imier was shifting from small ateliers to industrial production.

In 1916, Berna was selling machines under the name BDM (Berna Département Machines).

After the end of World War I, simple watches continued to be produced, but the firm's chronographs accounted for an increasing share of production.

During the recession of 1920–1921, Berna Watch Co. reduced its workforce, dismissing part of its staff, while other Saint-Imier watch factories largely used to partial unemployment.

In 1922, Berna started distributing Veglia alarm clocks and astronomical regulators by Strasser & Rohde.

According to L'Impartial, Bernard Gabus, who had served as director of Berna Watch Co. from 1922 to 1927, appeared before the Jura Court of Assizes following the company's bankruptcy in March 1928. The case concerned allegations that company funds had been used to settle personal debts during his tenure. The proceedings were described at the time as complex and were adjourned for further hearings. Following Gabus' bankruptcy, Berna entered bankruptcy in 1928, and was acquired by the Jeanneret family, who also owned the neighbouring Léonidas Watch Factory S.A., Excelsior Park and Moeris in Saint-Imier.

Berna and Léonidas operated in the same factory complex in Saint-Imier. When Heuer acquired Léonidas in 1964, creating the Heuer-Leonidas group, parts of Berna's factory and workforce were integrated into the Heuer-Leonidas manufacturing operations.

Following the death of Charles Jeanneret in 1979, Berna was formally dissolved in 1980.

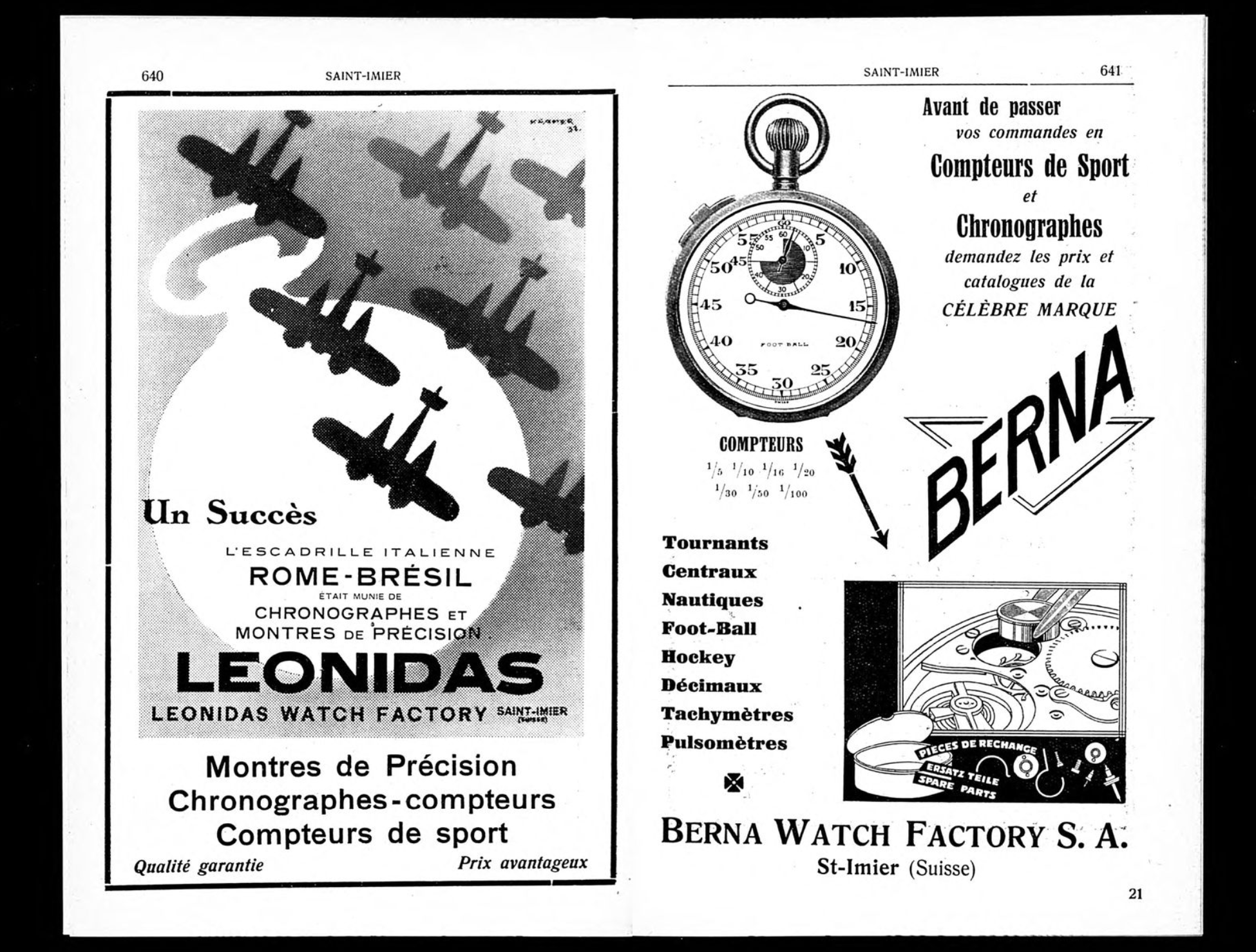
Berna and Léonidas advertisement

== Technical Innovations ==
=== Precision stopwatches ===
According to Linder, Berna produced laboratory and sporting stopwatches capable of measuring time to 1/100 second, featured in advertisements from 1918. These instruments used high-frequency balances and were used in industrial testing and athletics timing. According to Chaponnière writing in the Swiss Horological Journal, some of Berna's stopwatches were specifically made for scientific management.

=== Water-resistant watches ===
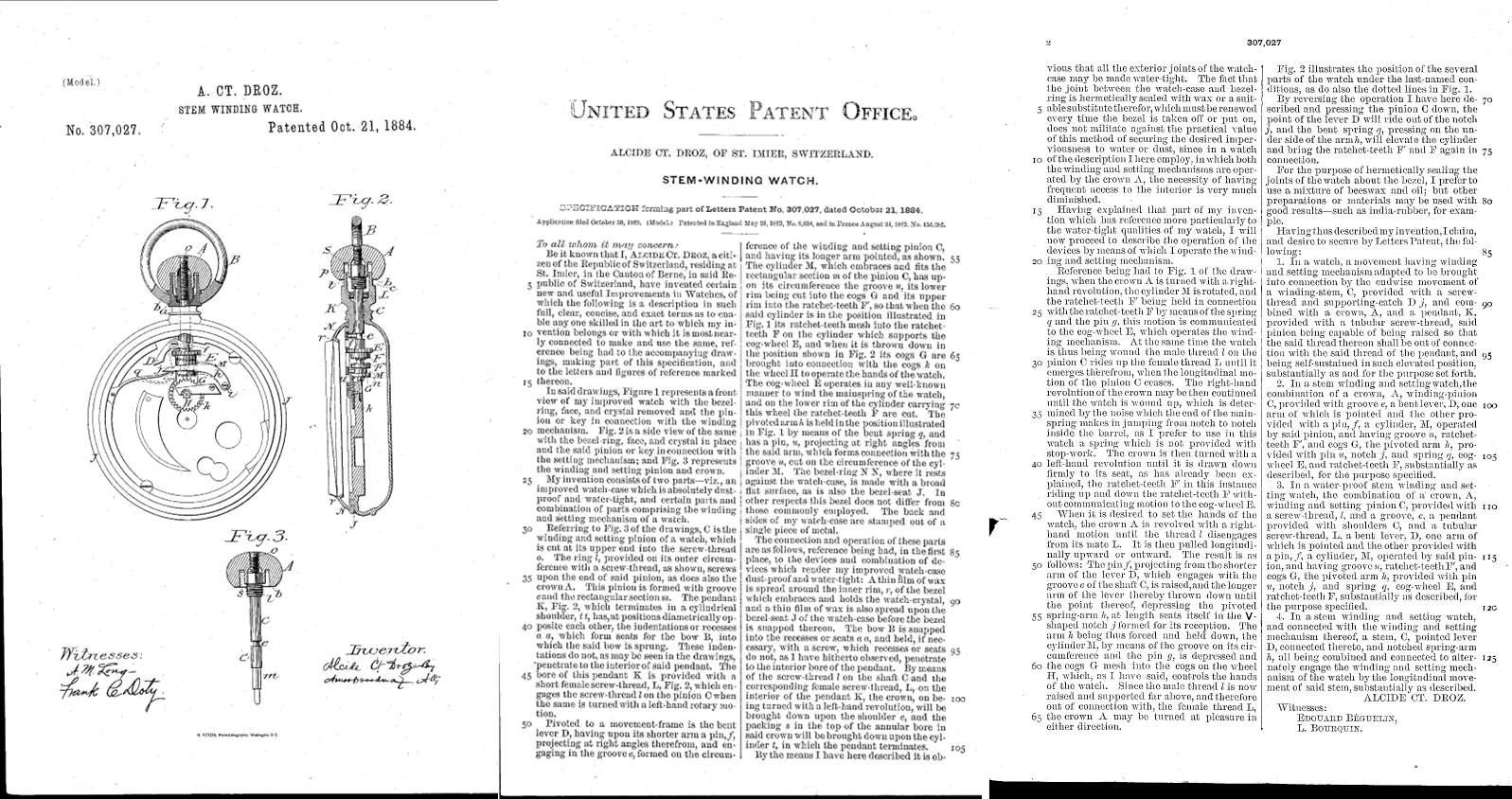
L'Imperméable patent 1884

In 1884, Alcide Droz patented the L'Imperméable, a pocket watch case designed to resist water and dust, using a screw-down crown and sealed joints. According to Claude Laesser, writing in Chronométrophilia, the L'Imperméable was a precursor of waterproof watches, mainly intended to protect the movement from dust and humidity.

Poirier notes that the model earned Droz a silver medal at the Antwerp Universal Exhibition of 1885. The Journal Suisse d'Horlogerie reported that at the 1883 Zurich National Exhibition, the L'Imperméable was displayed submerged in a jar of water alongside live fish.

In 1964, the trade magazine Europa Star featured an advertisement for a Berna diving watch that was waterproof to 200 m with a rotating bezel located beneath the crystal. The illustration featured the watch underwater together with fish, and has been likened to the earlier fishbowl advertisement of the L'Imperméable.

=== Yachting Starting Timer ===
Berna patented the five-aperture regatta countdown timer. The design used five circular windows on the dial, revealing a rotating coloured disc that counted down the final five minutes before a yacht race start.

Berna yacht watch patent 1913

Patents show that the Berna Watch Co. registered a mechanical yachting countdown chronograph in 1913. Some later accounts describe Gallet's 1915 regatta timer as the first example of the type. Berna's 1913 patent predates the 1915 design, although sources differ on which model should be treated as the first regatta timer.

The five-aperture regatta countdown system patented by Berna in 1913 was later incorporated into watches produced by Léonidas, and subsequently by Heuer after its acquisition of Léonidas in 1964. The Berna yachting countdown chronograph movement was used by other brands at the time, such as Abercrombie & Fitch and Ferdinand Berthoud.

=== Sports timing instruments ===
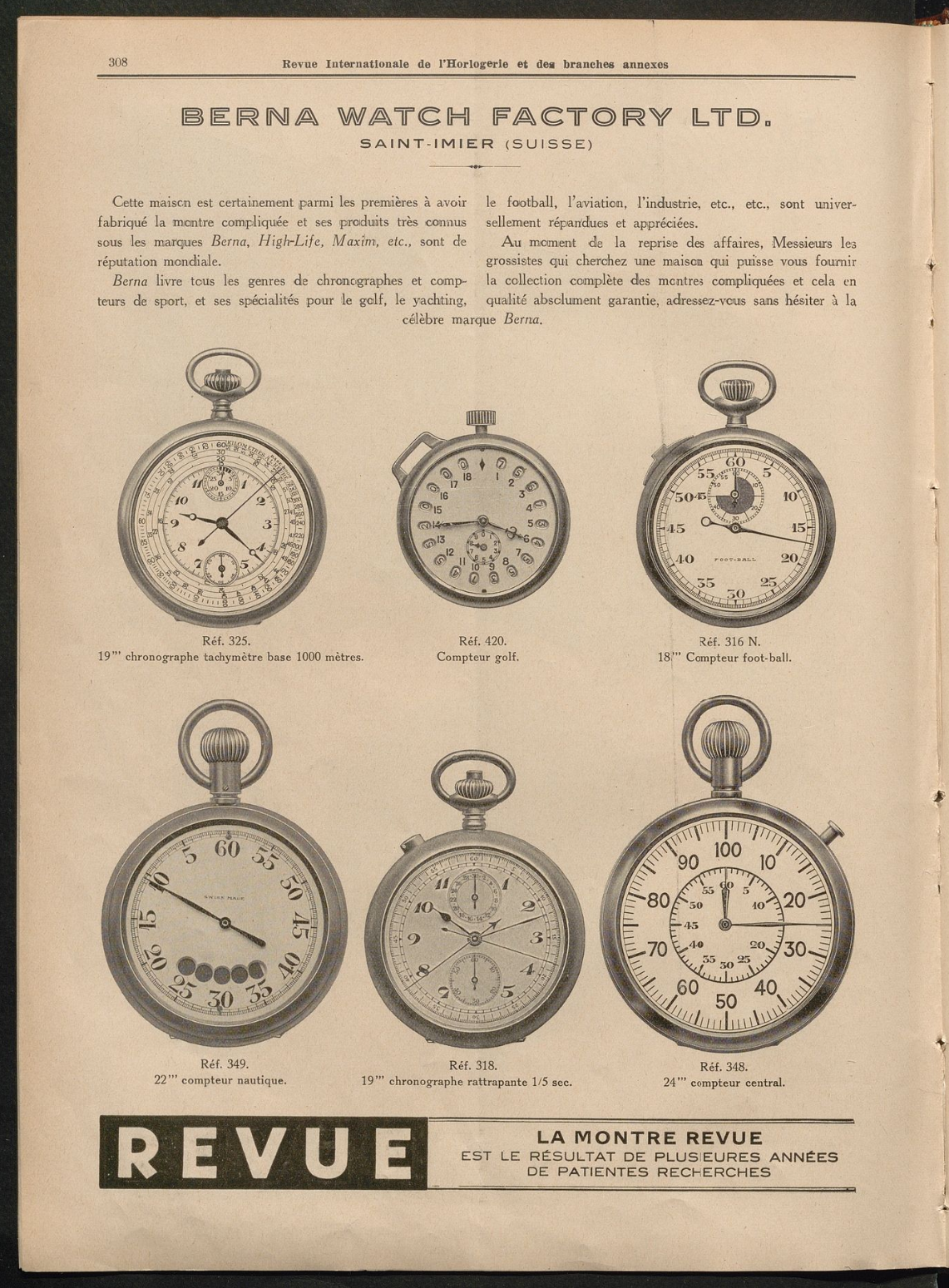
Berna sports watches advertisement

In addition to chronographs, Berna produced watches and other devices for sports applications, including football (soccer) watches, hockey watches and golf counters. The company's range also included double chronographs and tachymeter watches.

== Relationship with the West End Watch Co. ==
West End Watch Co. originated from the same Saint-Imier workshops as Droz & Cie, the manufacturer later known under the Berna name. In the 1880s, Alcide Droz and Georges-Arnold Charpié collaborated to establish a distribution branch in British India, importing Swiss-made Droz & Cie watches under the new West End brand.

On 15 October 1886, the trademark West End Watch Co. was registered, and by 1886, watches from the Droz factory were being sold throughout British India under the Berna brand.

When Droz & Cie. reorganised in 1904 as Fabrique d'Horlogerie Berna S.A. and later encountered financial difficulties that led to its 1908 sale and reconstitution as The Berna Watch Co., the relationship between the Swiss manufacturer and its Indian distributor broke down.

West End Watch Co. began to distance itself from the Berna name and adopted new brands such as Service and Secular for its watches.

The separation culminated in a legal dispute, The West End Watch Co. v. The Berna Watch Co., decided by the Bombay High Court on 22 November 1910 (reported as (1911) 13 BOMLR 212). The case centred on the right to use the name Berna in India.

West End argued that it had established substantial goodwill under that name through long use and advertising, and that the newly reorganised Berna Watch Co. had issued misleading circulars and advertisements suggesting continuity with West End's operations.

The Court, presided over by Chief Justice Basil Scott, held that West End had indeed built substantial goodwill in the name Berna but had abandoned that mark by 1907–1908, when it deliberately replaced it with other trade names such as Service and Secular. The Court ruled that the Swiss factory was entitled to resume use of its original Berna trademark.

However, the Court also found that The Berna Watch Co. had engaged in passing off by misrepresenting itself as a successor or agent of West End through misleading circulars.

An injunction was granted restraining the company from claiming any such connection or issuing deceptive advertising.

Following the case, the two entities pursued separate paths: by the early 1900s, the West End Watch Co. had become a "key player" in the mid-range watch market in India, serving as a distributor of brands like Mido, Cyma and Longines, while Berna continued in Switzerland as an independent manufacturer.

== Relationship with Léonidas ==
In 1928, the Berna Watch Co. was liquidated, and Charles Jeanneret of the Saint-Imier Jeanneret family was appointed to oversee the bankruptcy proceedings. The firm was re-registered in May 1928 under the name Charles Jeanneret, Fabrique de Montres Berna, in order to wind down operations at the factory on Rue des Marronniers 20. No buyer was found for the Marronniers site, which was subsequently closed and was no longer used for watch production. After that, Jeanneret re-established the brand in the same Beau-Site complex in Saint-Imier, where the Léonidas Watch Factory was already located.

In 1930 a new Berna S.A. was created, and Berna production was moved into the building at Beau-Site 8, next to the existing Léonidas factory.

Within this arrangement, Berna replaced the Junior brand as the secondary line to Léonidas, which increasingly concentrated on chronographs and stopwatches while continuing to produce time-only watches. Over the following decades, Berna continued alongside Léonidas under Jeanneret family ownership, and Beau-Site 8 became the shared production site for Léonidas, Berna and High-Life.

On 1 January 1964, Heuer and Léonidas merged to form Heuer–Leonidas. After the merger, the Léonidas name was increasingly used for stopwatches and lower-priced products, while Heuer became the principal brand of the combined company. Charles Jeanneret remained on the board of Heuer–Leonidas, while production was moved away from the Beau-Site factories.

For a time, the Beau-Site 8 plant operated as the Berna Watch Co. factory and was not included in the Heuer–Leonidas merger, although Heuer–Leonidas retained an interest in the site and continued using the building to produce Léonidas-branded stopwatches. Berna remained in business as a separate brand through the 1970s, even as the Beau-Site 8 building came to be commonly referred to as the Heuer–Leonidas factory.

In the 1980s, Heuer–Leonidas encountered financial difficulties and was taken over by the management of Nouvelle Lemania in 1982. Heuer subsequently became associated with Techniques d'Avant Garde (TAG) in 1985, becoming TAG Heuer. By then, the Leonidas brand was effectively discontinued, and the Saint-Imier factory at Beau-Site 8 was closed.

=== Military watches ===
The Beau-Site factories in Saint-Imier produced chronographs, stopwatches and other specialized timing instruments under the Berna and Léonidas names. Under Jeanneret family ownership, the factory also supplied to foreign armed forces and government agencies, and later literature on military timepieces records a number of Berna- and Léonidas-signed models as issued equipment or contract purchases.

Berna produced the integrated pocket chronograph for the Konishiroku Type 89 Camera Gun, developed for the Japanese Imperial Army. Manufactured from 1929 to 1945, the Type 89 combined a machine gun with an integrated camera for training purposes. The watch recorded timing information directly onto the 35 mm film for later analysis.

Prior to its 1964 merger with Heuer, the Saint-Imier factory produced a series of military chronographs and other timekeepers under the Léonidas brand that were later adopted and standardized by the German Bundeswehr and Italian armed forces. Examples include the CP-2 flyback chronograph, a 43mm wristwatch fitted with the Valjoux 222 movement. Issued under the military designation CP-2, these models were supplied to units of the Italian Air Force and the Italian Army, with markings such as A.M.I. or E.I. engraved on the casebacks. Later accounts describe this model with a flyback function, luminous Arabic numerals, and bidirectional bezels, as the predecessor of Heuer's Bundeswehr 1550 SG chronographs.

In press coverage of the first Swiss watchmaking fair in 1933, Le Franc-Montagnard reported that Léonidas of Saint-Imier was exhibiting special watches for Italian military aviation instruments, noting that the success of pieces supplied to Italo Balbo's transatlantic expedition had led to a follow-up order for 1,000 watches.

=== Sports-timing devices at the Beau-Site factory ===
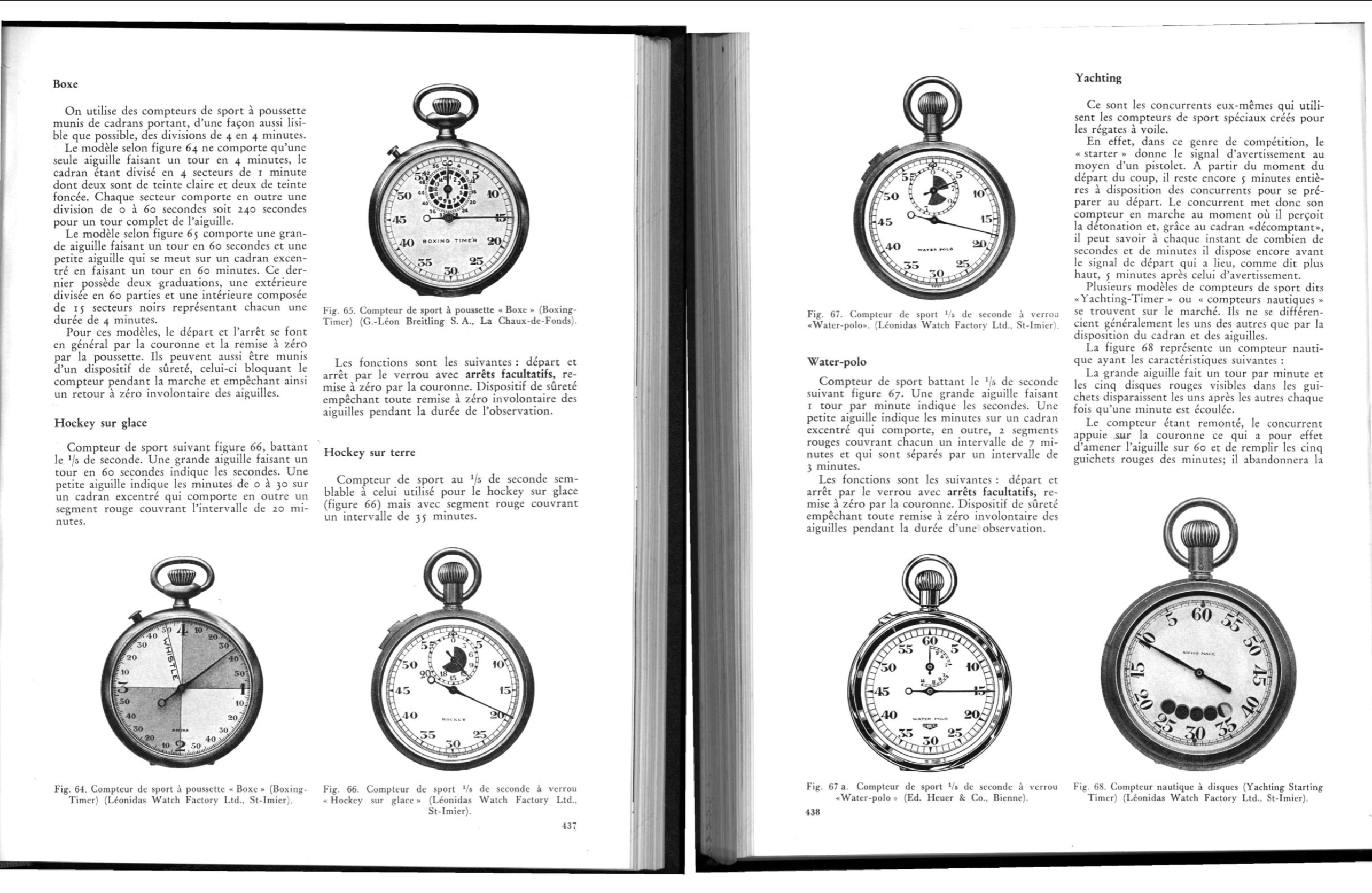
Several sports-timing instruments sold under the Léonidas brand

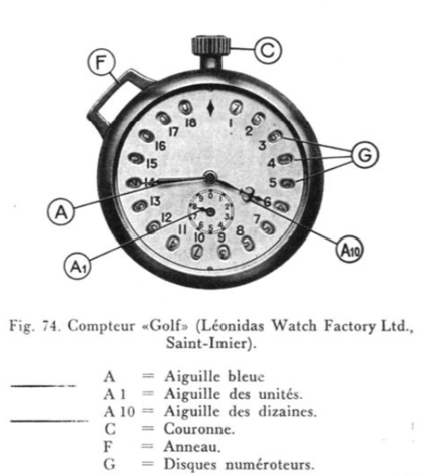
Diagram of the Golf Counter sold under the Léonidas brand

Berna's 1930s advertising included a golf-counter, while a 1931 patent for a golf-counter device was filed in the name of the Léonidas Watch Factory. By 1934, newspaper coverage reported Berna selling a golf counter, and a 1936 advertisement illustrated the device. A 1947 article in the Journal Suisse d'Horlogerie later presented a golf-counter under the Léonidas name, alongside other sports timing watches for floorball, hockey, and water polo. The appearance of Berna-marketed products covered by Léonidas-filed patents, and Léonidas-branded regatta watches based on Berna's patented yachting timer system, indicate that the two brands shared access to patented designs within the Beau-Site factory complex.

== Awards and recognition ==
Berna and its predecessor firms (Droz & Perret, Alcide Droz & Fils, and Droz & Cie) are recorded in trade publications, advertising and official reports as having received distinctions at international exhibitions and chronometry competitions between 1878 and 1923.

=== Silver Medals ===
- Exposition Universelle, Paris 1878
- Melbourne International Exhibition, 1880
- Exposition Horlogère, La Chaux-de-Fonds 1881
- Swiss National Exhibition, Zürich 1883.
- International Exhibition, Amsterdam 1883
- World's Fair, Antwerp 1885
- Exposition National Suisse, Geneva, 1896

=== Gold Medals ===
- World's Columbian Exposition, Chicago 1893
- Exposition Nationale Suisse, Thun 1899
- Exposition Universelle, Paris 1900
- Esposizione Internazionale, Milan 1906

=== Special Diplomas ===
- Tokyo International Exposition, 1914
- Tokyo International Exposition, 1922

=== Chronometry competition ===
- Observatoire officiel de Neuchâtel Chronometry competition, 1913: Pocket chronometers 1st prize
- Observatoire officiel de Neuchâtel Chronometry competition commemorating the centenary of Abraham-Louis Breguet, 1923: Three Second Prizes

== Trademarks and brands associated with Berna ==
In addition to Berna, L'Imperméable and West End Watch Co., the firm registered or used several trademarks over time, including: (Note: Each of the following trademarks is recorded in the Schweizerisches Handelsamtsblatt or other contemporary horological publications: Band 26 (1908) – بيرنه (Berna); Band 27 (1909) – High-Life, Jonchères, Franco, Bonheur, Maxim / Maximum; Band 30 (1912) – Adler, Aguila, Aigle, Eagle; Band 31 (1913) – Adler, Aguila, Aigle, Eagle, B.W.Co, Radiation; Band 32 (1914) – Maxim / Maximum, Bernard Watch, Monarch, Gracilis, Expert Watch, H.M., Etonia; Band 35 (1917) – BDM, B.M.Co, Va Bien / Vabien; Band 39 (1921) – Marna; Band 41 (1923) – Chronoberna; Revue internationale de l'horlogerie (1906, Vol. 10 No. 24) – Messidor, The Charmer; and Inventions-Revue (1909, Nos. 1–12) – NEWD.P, WORLDLY.)

- Adler / Aguila / Aigle / Eagle
- B.M.Co
- B.W.Co
- BDM
- Bernard Watch
- Bonheur
- Chronoberna
- Etonia
- Expert Watch
- Franco
- Gracilis
- Halgreen
- H.M
- High-Life
- Jonchères
- Marna
- Maxim / Maximum
- Messidor
- Monarch
- NEWD.P
- Radiation
- The Charmer
- Vabien / Va Bien
- WORLDLY
- بيرنه (Berna)

== Legacy ==
The name L'Imperméable, originally used for the water- and dust-resistant watch case developed by Alcide Droz's Saint-Imier manufacture, has been reused in the 21st century by the West End Watch Co. for a contemporary wristwatch collection marketed under the same name.

Berna's 1913 patented basic design for a regatta countdown display using multiple dial apertures appeared in later regatta watches such as the Bulgari Diagono Professional Regatta, Frederique Constant Yacht Timer Countdown, Omega Seamaster Racing 300 M, Seiko Yacht Timer Sports 200 and Tissot Aquastar Regate.

== See also ==
- Gallet & Company
- L'impermeable
- List of Swiss watch manufacturers
- List of world's fairs
- Saint-Imier
- Tag Heuer
- West End Watch Co.
