= Birney (surname) =

Birney is a surname of Scottish origin. Notable people with the surname include:

- David B. Birney (1825–1864), American Civil War Union general
- David Birney (born 1939), American actor
- Earle Birney (1904–1995), Canadian poet
- Ewan Birney (born 1972), British biologist
- Jack Birney (1928–1995), Australian politician
- James G. Birney (1792–1857), abolitionist; candidate for U.S. President (Liberty Party) in 1840 and 1844
- Matt Birney (born 1969), Australian politician
