= Maximilian Bern =

German writer and editor

Maximilian Bern (November 11, 1849 – September 10, 1923) was a German writer and editor.

He was born in Kherson, Russian Empire, where his father was a physician. Upon his father's death, his mother took him to Vienna, which was either in the Austrian Empire or Austria-Hungary at the time, to further his education from 1869 to 1872 he studied philosophy and literature there, but had to drop out of school when the family fortune was lost. In 1873 he became a private tutor at an equestrian school. The success of his first novel Auf Schwankem Grunde, allowed him to become a freelance writer and travel extensively. From 1885-1887 he was in Paris and in the following year married an Austrian actress, Olga Wohlbrück. In 1888, they settled in Berlin, where he continued to write prolifically.

After spending his entire life savings (100,000 marks) on a single subway ticket around Old Berlin during the devastating period of hyperinflation in Germany, he returned to his apartment where, unable to support himself, he starved to death.

None of his works have been translated into English.
