= Berne (surname) =

Berne is a surname, and may refer to:

- Brendan Berne, Australian civil servant and diplomat
- Dagmar Berne (1866–1900), Australian physician
- Eric Berne (1910–1970), Canadian psychiatrist
- Étienne-Prosper Berne-Bellecour (1838–1910), French painter, printmaker and illustrator
- Eva von Berne (1910–2010), Austrian film actress
- Gary Berne (1944–2021), United States Virgin Islands sports shooter
- John Berne (born 1954), Australian rugby union and rugby league footballer
- Josef Berne (1904–1964), Russian-born American writer, film director and producer
- Michael Berne (born 1981), Australian rugby union and rugby league footballer
- Patricia Berne (1967–2025), American writer, performance artist, film director and disability rights organizer
- Robert M. Berne (1918–2001), American cardiologist
- Rosalyn W. Berne, American scholar, author and academic
- Shaun Berne (born 1979), Australian rugby union footballer and coach
- Suzanne Berne (born 1961), American novelist
- Tim Berne (born 1954), American jazz saxophonist and composer

== See also ==
- Bern (surname)
- Berns (surname)
- Berney (surname)
- Bernie (surname)
