= Lars Bern =

Swedish engineer (born 1942)

- Born: Lars Anders Vilhelm Bern; 21 October 1942 (age 82); Sundsvall, Västernorrland County, Sweden
- Occupations: Engineer; doctor; author; debater
- Spouse: Britt-Marie Ekblad (m. 1966)

Lars Anders Vilhelm Bern (born on October 21, 1942) is a Swedish engineer, doctor of technology, author and debater. He is a member of the Royal Swedish Academy of Engineering Sciences. Bern has denied that the greenhouse effect has been proven, denies the extent of human influence on climate change that is part of the scientific consensus on climate change and has been described as a climate sceptic, climate denialist and conspiracy theorist.

Bern has been chairman of the corporation which operates the television channel Swebbtv, which has been described as conspiratorial and far-right.

== Bibliography ==
- Bern, Lars (1994). Uthålligt ledarskap. Ekerlids förlag. ISBN 9789188594006.
- Bern, Lars (1996). Strategi för naturlig tillväxt. Ekerlids förlag. ISBN 9789188594495.
- Bern, Lars (1998). Strategy for Sustainable Growth. ISBN 9163070537.
- Bern, Lars (2002). Humankapitalisten. Ekerlids förlag. ISBN 9789189617292.
- Bern, Lars (2006). Svart snö. Kalla Kulor Förlag. ISBN 9789197574846.
- Bern, Lars (2008). En gudomlig skapelse? : en vetenskapsthriller. Fri Tanke Förlag. ISBN 9789197709460.
- Bern L.; Thauersköld Crusell M. (2009). Chill-out – sanningen om klimatbubblan. Kalla Kulor Förlag. ISBN 9789185535583.
- Bern, Lars (2010). Homo Eco. Recito Förlag. ISBN 978-9186539641.
- Bern, Lars (2013). Antropocen. Recito Förlag. ISBN 9789175175324.
- Bern, Lars (2014). Varför försvinner våra kronjuveler. Ekerlids förlag. ISBN 9789187391545.
- Bern, Lars (2015). Antropocen II. Recito Förlag. ISBN 9789175178332.
- Bern, Lars (2018). Den metabola pandemin. Recito Förlag. ISBN 9789177654315.
