= Clementine Bern-Zernik =

Austrian lawyer and librarian

- Born: Clementine Bloch; September 28, 1905; Vienna, Austria
- Died: December 31, 1996 (aged 91); Queens, New York, U.S.
- Citizenship: Austria, United States
- Education: University of Vienna, Teachers College, Columbia University, Columbia University
- Occupations: Lawyer, librarian

Clementine Bern-Zernik (née Bloch; September 28, 1905 – December 31, 1996) was an Austrian lawyer and librarian.

She was born in 1905 in Vienna, Austria to close-knit Austrian-Jewish family. Her father, Max Bloch (b. 1876) was a servant who had been an officer in the Austrian-Hungarian Army, worked as a tax consultant and later became a civil servant in the Taxes and Fees Department of the Ministry of Finance. Her mother, Olga (née Bermann) was born in 1879, both of her parents were of Austrian-Jewish and Hungarian-Jewish descent. She had one sister, Erna Safich, who died in 1974.

She obtained her Juris Doctor in 1930 and began a seven-year training requirement at a juvenile court in order to become an attorney. It was during her training that Bloch discovered an interest in criminal law, and she thereby became a prosecutor. Her time as a lawyer was short-lived, however, as she was forbidden to practice law due to her Jewish ancestry beginning on July 15, 1938. That same year, she married architect Oskar Bern. They subsequently immigrated to New York City where Bern-Zernik found a translating job for a newspaper.

In 1941, Bern-Zernik later earned her M.A. in Latin and German from the Teachers College, Columbia University. However, due to being Jewish and not being an American citizen, she found few prospects as an educator. From 1944-1946, Bern-Zernik became a naturalized citizen and began working various jobs with the Office of War Information, American Broadcasting Service in Europe, and as a director for a Displaced Person Camp in Germany. By 1948, she returned to New York and served as a librarian at the United Nations. During her time a librarian, she was a liaison between the United Nations and New York Public Library. During that same year, she married her second husband Herbert Zernik. In 1954, she earned an M.A. in library science at Columbia University.

Bern-Zernik died on December 31, 1996, aged 91, in Queens, New York.

== See also ==
- New York Public Library
