= Jacob Berni House =

Historic house in Wisconsin, United States

- U.S. National Register of Historic Places
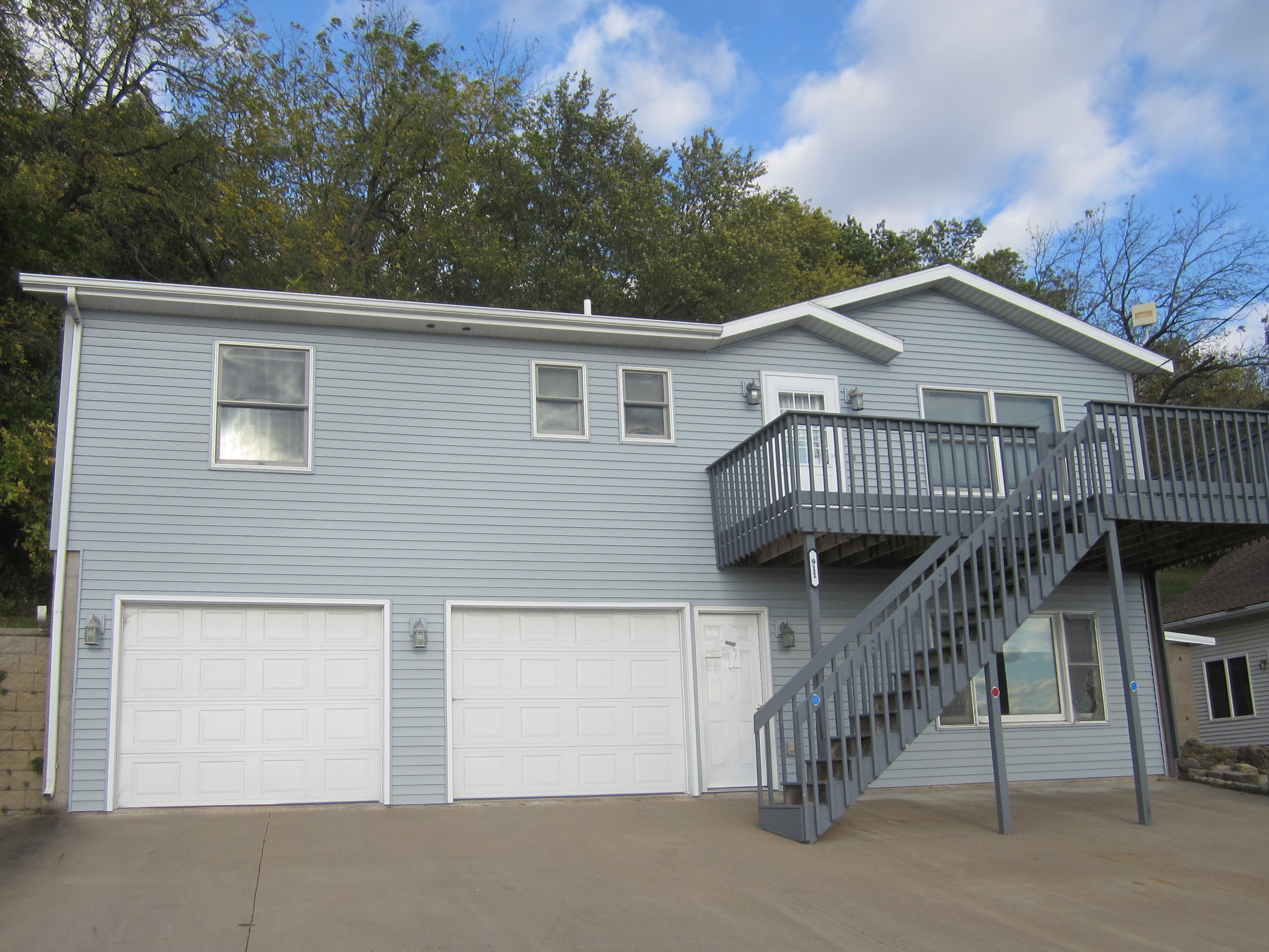
- Jacob Berni House

- Location within Wisconsin Location within the United States
- Location: 911 Riverview Dr., Alma, Wisconsin
- Coordinates: 44°19′51″N 91°55′14″W
- Area: 0.1 acres (0.040 ha)
- Built: 1885
- MPS: Alma MRA
- NRHP reference No.: 82000632
- Added to NRHP: May 13, 1982

The Jacob Berni House was a historic structure located in Alma, Wisconsin.

== History ==
Jacob Berni (b. 1857) was a foreman of logging and rafting crews, a farmer, president of a cheese factory, and school board treasurer. The house, built in 1885, was listed on the National Register of Historic Places in 1982 and on the State Register of Historic Places in 1989.

The Berni house was destroyed by fire and a raised, ranch-style house was built on the property around 2003.
