= Maria Berny =

Polish politician (1932–2021)

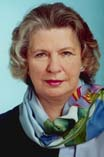
- Maria Berny

Senator of Poland
- In office 1993–1997
- In office 2001–2005

Personal details
- Born: Maria Waćkowska; 7 August 1932 Trościanka, Wołyń, Poland
- Died: 23 December 2021 (aged 89) Polanica-Zdrój, Poland
- Party: Social Democracy of Poland
- Other political affiliations: Polish United Workers' Party, Social Democracy of the Republic of Poland, Democratic Left Alliance
- Education: University of Wrocław
- Occupation: Politician, activist
- Awards: Officer of the Order of Polonia Restituta

Maria Berny (née Waćkowska; 7 August 1932 – 23 December 2021) was a Polish politician and activist, who was a senator of the 3rd and 5th republic in Poland.

== Life and career ==
Maria Waćkowska was born on 7 August 1932. She graduated from the pedagogiczne high school in Krzeszowice and for 12 years she worked as a teacher. In 1970 she graduated from the Faculty of Philosophy and History at the University of Wrocław. She managed the Press and Book Lovers Club in Wrocław. Berny also worked in the Art Exhibitions Bureau. In 2000, she was one of the co-founders of the Association for Citizen Safety Support and a member of the Association of Active and Creative Women in Wrocław.

She was a member to PZPR, then to SDRP, in 1999 joined the SLD. In the years 1993-1997 she was a senator representing the Wrocław voivodship. From 1998 to 2001 she was the councillor of the Lower Silesian Seym. She was again elected senator in 2001 from the Wrocław district. In March 2004, she decamped to the Social Democracy of Poland.

In 2005 she was not re-elected. Berny died on 23 December 2021, at the age of 89. She was buried on 4 January 2022.

== Decorations ==
- Officer of the Order of Polonia Restituta by President Aleksander Kwaśniewski in 1998.
