= Bernie =

Bernie may refer to:

== Places in the United States ==
- Bernie, Missouri, a city
- Griffithsville, West Virginia, also called Bernie

== People ==
- Bernie (given name)
- Bernie (surname)

== Films ==
- Bernie (1996 film), a French film
- Bernie (2011 film), directed by Richard Linklater

== Television ==
- Bernie, a British comedy series running from 1978 to 1980 featuring Bernie Winters

== See also ==
- Bern (disambiguation)
- Berne (disambiguation)
- Berny (disambiguation)
- Barney (disambiguation)
