= Simon Hopkinson =

English chef & food writer (born 1954)

- Born: Simon Charles Hopkinson; 5 June 1954 (age 71); Bury, Lancashire, England
- Occupations: Chef; food writer

Simon Charles Hopkinson (born 5 June 1954) is an English food writer, critic and former chef. He published his first cookbook, Roast Chicken and Other Stories, in 1994.

== Early life ==
Hopkinson was born in Greenmount, Bury, in 1954, the son of a dentist father and a mother who taught art at Bury Grammar School. At the age of eight he was awarded a chorister's scholarship to St John's College School in Cambridge. At 13 he moved to Trent College, near Nottingham.

== Early career ==
Hopkinson started his career at the age of 17 in the kitchens of Le Normandie in Birtle, near Bury, Lancashire, under the supervision of Yves Champeau. Following on from this, in 1978 he became the youngest chef to acquire an Egon Ronay Guide star with his restaurant the Shed in Dinas in Pembrokeshire, West Wales.

He spent the next two and a half years as an Egon Ronay inspector. He returned to London, and, after a three-year stint as a private chef, he was installed at Hilaire, which opened in Old Brompton Road in 1983. A friendship with the Conrans led to the establishment of Bibendum in 1987, where he worked as the chef and joint proprietor with Sir Terence Conran and the late Lord Paul Hamlyn.

== Bibendum ==
Bibendum was created out of the abandoned Michelin House on Fulham Road, which served as Michelin's UK headquarters from 1911 to 1985. Inside the restaurant, Hopkinson continued his philosophy of well-judged simple cooking which he garnered from his influences Richard Olney, Jane Grigson and Elizabeth David.

He also began a cookery column in The Independent and in 1994 his first book, Roast Chicken and Other Stories (co-authored with Lindsey Bareham), was published. It later won a Glenfiddich Food and Drink Award. In 2005, it was voted "Most Useful Cookbook of All Time" by Waitrose Food Illustrated magazine.

Also in 1994, Hopkinson suffered what he termed a "mini-breakdown" during restaurant service one evening. He left Bibendum early in 1995 to devote his time to cookery writing. He was replaced as the head chef by Matthew Harris.

== Television ==
In June 2011, Hopkinson presented his cooking show The Good Cook, every Friday after The One Show on BBC. The series consisted of 6 episodes, being frequently repeated on BBC Two and some excerpts used on BBC One's Saturday Kitchen. From June 2013, Hopkinson has presented a new show called Simon Hopkinson Cooks on Channel 4's digital channel More4.

== Personal life ==
Hopkinson is gay, having come out to his family when he was 26. He was listed at #52 on the 2011 Pink List.

== Bibliography ==
=== Books ===
- Roast Chicken and Other Stories, 1994
- Sweetbreads, Liver and Kidneys, 1997
- Gammon and Spinach, Macmillan, 1998
- The Prawn Cocktail Years (with Lindsey Bareham), 1997
- Second Helpings of Roast Chicken, Random House, 2006
- Week In Week Out, Quadrille, 2007
- The Bibendum Cookbook (with Terence Conran and Matthew Harris), Octopus Books, 2008
- The Vegetarian, Option, Abrams, 2009
- The Good Cook, Ebury Publishing, 2012
- Simon Hopkinson Cooks, Random House, 2013

=== Articles ===
- Hopkinson, Simon (10 September 2014). "Autumn treasures". Simon's Kitchen. Country Life. 208 (37): 128–129.
