= Berna Yurtsever =

Turkish boxing referee

Personal information
- Born: 23 April 1973 (age 53) Adapazarı, Sakarya, Turkey

Sport
- Sport: Boxing

Berna Yurtsever (born 23 April 1973) is a Turkish school teacher for physical education and a boxing referee. She is her country's first AIBA 3-star female referee.

== Officiating career ==
Suggested by her father, Yurtsever attended a boxing referee course in Ankara, Turkey. After successfully completing the course, she started her officiating career in 2003. She first served as a trainee referee. Then, she became a regional and subsequently a national referee. Following having received the European Boxing Association (EBA) badge, she took the exam for the World Boxing Association (AIBA), which is the highest badge, and passed. In 2009, the AIBA appointed her to the 2009 Presidents Cup in Baku, Azerbaijan. After officiating successfully, she was awarded the 3-star AIBA badge. She became so the first Turkish female boxing referee having the highest badge.

In the beginning, Yurtsever was in charge of officiating matches as referee of youth and junior championships at European and world level. She served at the 2014 Summer Youth Olympics in Nanjing, China, 2014 AIBA Youth World Boxing Championships in Sofia, Bulgaria, 2016 Women's European Amateur Boxing Championships in Sofia, 2016 AIBA Women's World Boxing Championships in Astana, Kazakhstan, 2021 International Istanbul Bosphorus Boxing Tournament, Turkey, as well as at the IBA Women's World Boxing Championships of 2022 in Istanbul, Turkey, and 2023 in New Delhi, India, 2024 IBA Youth World Boxing Championships in Budva, Montenegro, 2024 ASBC Asian Men & Women Boxing Championships in Chiang Mai, Thailand, 2024 European Amateur Boxing Championships in Belgrade, Serbia, 2025 ASBC Asian U22 Boxing Championships in Colombo, Sri Lanka. In addition to her role as a boxing referee, she serves also as a boxing judge at international championships.

== Personal life ==
Berna Yurtsever was born into a family originating from Sivas on 23 April 1973 in Adapazarı District of Sakarya Province, western Turkey, where her military personnel father was appointed. Her father, Fuat Yurtsever, is a former coach of the Turkey national boxing team.

Yurtsever serves as school teacher for physical education.

== See also ==
Other Turkish female boxing referees:

- Ebru Koç,
- Yasemin Us.
