= Aldo Berni =

- Born: 14 March 1909; Bardi, Emilia-Romagna, Italy
- Died: 12 October 1997 (aged 88)
- Occupation: Restaurateur
- Known for: Berni Inns

Aldo Berni (14 March 1909 – 12 October 1997) was an Italian-born British restaurateur, known for the Berni Inn restaurant chain that he founded with his older brother Frank Berni.

== Career ==
Aldo Berni was born on 14 March 1909 in Bardi, northern Italy. He was the youngest of Louis Berni's three sons.
