= Lindsey Bareham =

British food writer

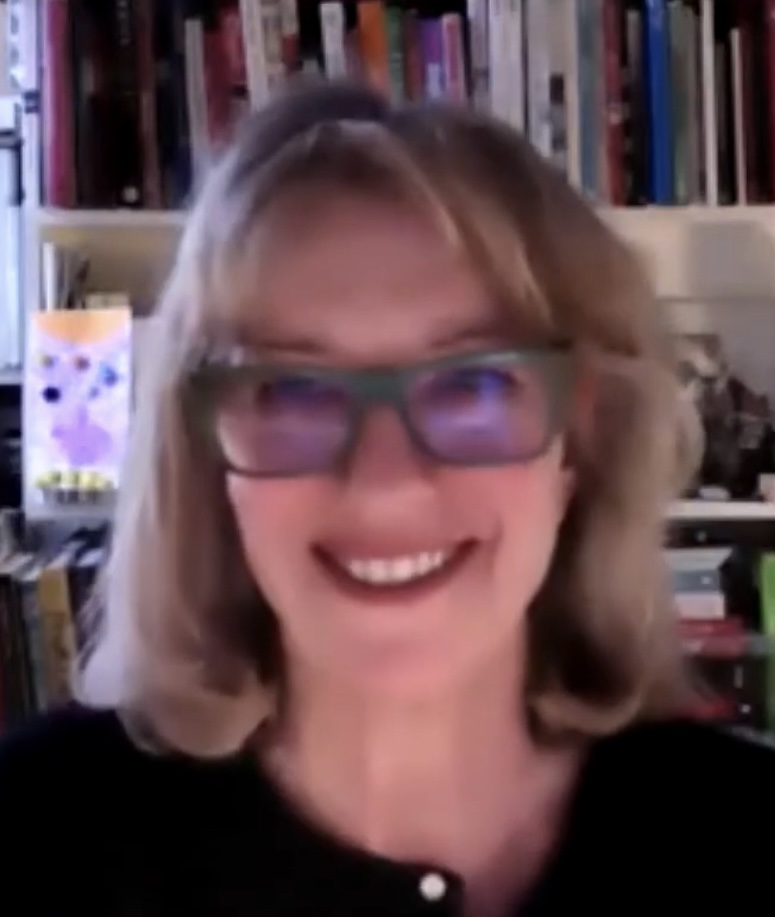
- Bareham in 2021
- Born: England
- Occupation: Writer
- Known for: Cookery writing

Lindsey Bareham is a British food writer. She began her career by editing the restaurant section of Time Out magazine. For eight years, she wrote a daily recipe for the Evening Standard, and she currently writes for The Times.

== Publications ==
Bareham is the author of fifteen cookery books.

- In Praise of the Potato
- A Celebration of Soup
- Onions without Tears
- The Little Book of Big Soups
- The Big Red Book of Tomatoes
- Supper Won’t Take Long
- A Wolf in the Kitchen
- Just One Pot
- Dinner in a Dash
- Hungry?
- The Fish Store
- Pasties
- ' One Pot Wonders
- ' The Trifle Bowl and Other Tales
- ' Dinner Tonight

=== With Simon Hopkinson ===
- The Prawn Cocktail Years (1997)
- Roast Chicken and Other Stories
