= Berny =

Berny is a given name, usually a short form (hypocorism) of Bernard. It may refer to:

- Bernardina Berny Boxem-Lenferink (born 1948), Dutch retired middle-distance runner
- Berny Burke (born 1996), Costa Rican footballer
- Bernabé Berny Peña (born 1980), Costa Rican footballer
- Bernard Stone (1927–2014), American politician
- Berny Ulloa Morera (born 1950), retired football referee from Costa Rica
- Berny Wiens (born 1945), Canadian politician
- Bernard Wolf (1911–2006), American animator and television producer
- Berny Wright (born 1979), Costa Rican footballer
- Berny-Ignatius, famous music composer-duo-brothers in the Malayalam film industry

== See also ==
- Berny-en-Santerre, commune in the Somme department in Picardie in northern France
- Berny-Rivière, commune in the department of Aisne in Picardy in northern France
- Gare de La Croix de Berny, a station of the Paris RER
- Bernie (disambiguation)
