= Frank Berni =

- Born: 30 October 1903; Bardi, Emilia-Romagna, Italy
- Died: 10 July 2000 (aged 96); St Lawrence, Jersey
- Occupation: restaurateur
- Known for: Berni Inns

Frank Berni (30 October 1903 – 10 July 2000) was an Italian-born British restaurateur, known for the Berni Inn restaurant chain that he founded with his younger brother Aldo Berni.

== Career ==
Frank Berni was born on 30 October 1903 in Bardi, northern Italy. He was the eldest of Louis Berni's three sons.

Louis Berni was the owner of a business called Louis Café in Ebbw Vale, Wales.

Berni finished his education in Italy, and then left for Wales, where his father had a cafe business.

== Personal life ==
In 1942, Berni married Lina Allegri, who was from a Welsh Italian family involved in the cafe business in Llanelli. They had two daughters.
